= Magdalena Sibylle of Brandenburg-Bayreuth =

Electress of Saxony from 1656 to 1680

Magdalene Sibylle of Brandenburg-Bayreuth
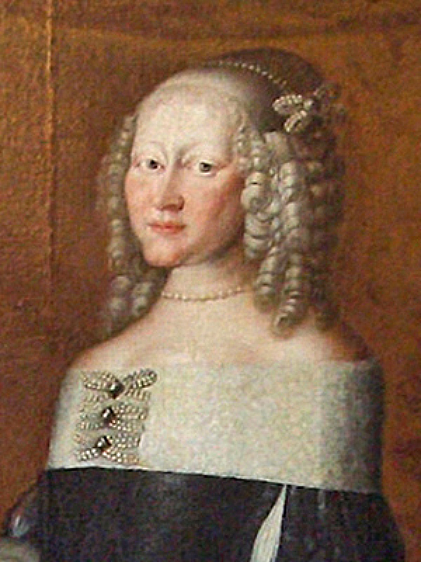
- Portrait by unknown, 17th century
- Born: 27 October 1612; Bayreuth
- Died: 20 March 1687 (aged 74); Dresden
- Spouse: John George II, Elector of Saxony (m. 1638; died 1680)
- Issue Detail: Erdmuthe Sophie, Margravine of Brandenburg-Bayreuth; John George III, Elector of Saxony
Names
- Magdalene Sibylle of Brandenburg-Bayreuth
- House: Hohenzollern
- Father: Christian, Margrave of Brandenburg-Bayreuth
- Mother: Marie of Prussia

Magdalene Sibylle of Brandenburg-Bayreuth (27 October 1612 – 20 March 1687) was Electress of Saxony from 1656 to 1680 as the wife of John George II. The daughter of Christian, Margrave of Brandenburg-Bayreuth, and Marie of Prussia, she was by birth a Markgräfin, or Margravine, and a member of the Brandenburg-Bayreuth branch of the House of Hohenzollern.

== Life ==
Born in Bayreuth, she was her parents' fifth child. Her maternal grandparents were Albert Frederick, Duke of Prussia, and Marie Eleonore of Cleves. One of her maternal aunts was Duchess Anna of Prussia. She had three surviving siblings: Anna Maria (1609–1680), wife of Prince Johann Anton I von Eggenberg, Duke of Krumlov; Erdmann August (1615–1651); and George Albert (1619–1666), who acted as regent of Brandenburg-Bayreuth during the minority of his nephew Christian Ernst.

She was married to John George, Prince Elector of Saxony, on 13 November 1638 in Dresden. He was her first cousin, being the son of her maternal aunt and namesake, Magdalene Sibylle of Prussia. Her sister-in-law and cousin was Magdalene Sibylle of Saxony.

Magdalene Sibylle had a good relationship with the Swedish royal family (the Queen consort from 1620 to 1632, Maria Eleonora of Brandenburg, was her first cousin) and was able to save the city of Pirna from attack by a letter to the Swedish commander in 1639, during the Thirty Years' War. In 1680 she was widowed and retired to Freiberg-Colditz.

== Death ==
She died in Dresden in 1687, aged 74. Following her death, Magdalene Sibylle was interred in the burial chapel of Freiberg Cathedral, where she rests eternally at plot [N-4] directly alongside her husband, Elector John George II.

== Issue ==
She had three children:

1. Sibylle Marie (Dresden, 16 September 1642 – Dresden, 27 February 1643), died young;
2. Erdmuthe Sophie (Dresden, 25 February 1644 – Schloss Bayreuth, 22 June 1670), married her cousin, Christian Ernst, Margrave of Brandenburg-Bayreuth, on 29 October 1662; died without issue;
3. John George III (Dresden, 20 June 1647 – Tübingen, 12 September 1691), his father's successor as John George III, Elector of Saxony.

== Ancestry ==
Ancestors of Magdalena Sibylle of Brandenburg-Bayreuth

8. Joachim II Hector, Elector of Brandenburg
4. John George, Elector of Brandenburg
9. Magdalena of Saxony
2. Christian, Margrave of Brandenburg-Bayreuth
10. Joachim Ernest, Prince of Anhalt
5. Elisabeth of Anhalt-Zerbst
11. Countess Agnes of Barby-Mühlingen
1. Magdalena Sibylle of Brandenburg-Bayreuth
12. Albert, Duke of Prussia
6. Albert Frederick, Duke of Prussia
13. Anna Marie of Brunswick-Lüneburg
3. Marie of Prussia
14. William, Duke of Jülich-Cleves-Berg
7. Marie Eleonore of Cleves
15. Archduchess Maria of Austria

Magdalena Sibylle of Brandenburg-Bayreuth House of Hohenzollern Born: 27 October 1612 Died: 20 March 1687
Royal titles
Preceded by Magdalene Sibylle of Prussia	Electress consort of Saxony; 1656–1680	Succeeded by Princess Anna Sophie of Denmark
