= Anna Maria von Eggenberg, née Brandenburg-Bayreuth =

Austrian noble

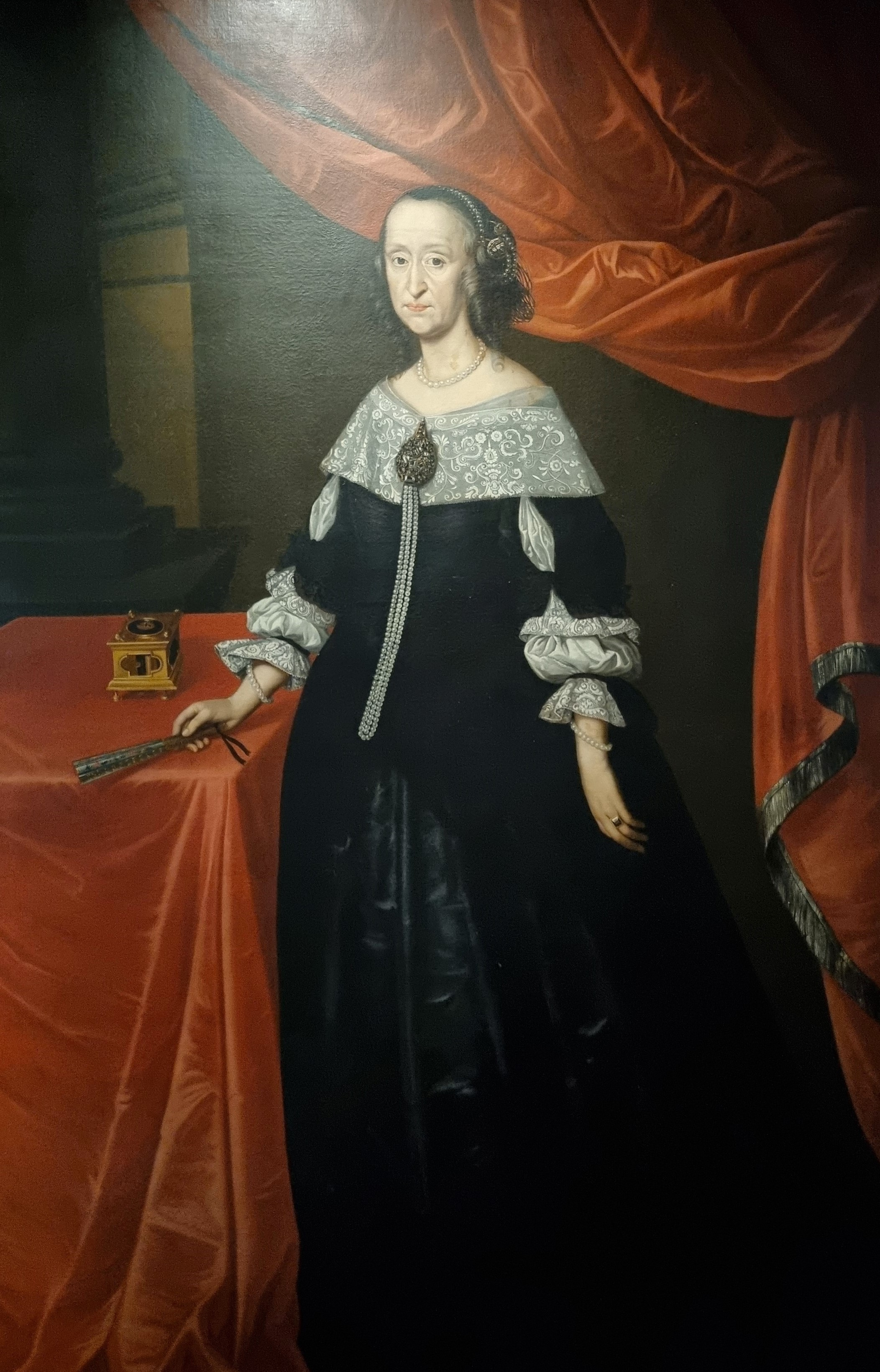
- Portrait (1670s), Český Krumlov Castle
- Born: 30 December 1609; Bayreuth
- Died: 8 May 1680 (aged 70); Ödenburg
- Spouse: Johann Anton I von Eggenberg
- Parents: Christian von Brandenburg-Bayreuth (father); Marie of Prussia (mother)
- Family: Hohenzollern

Anna Maria Princess of Eggenberg, née Brandenburg-Bayreuth (born 30 December 1609 in Bayreuth; died 8 May 1680 in Ödenburg) was a Margravine of Brandenburg-Bayreuth and, by marriage Johann Anton I von Eggenberg, a Fürstin (princess) of Eggenberg.

== Life ==
Anna Maria was a daughter of the Margrave Christian von Brandenburg-Bayreuth from his marriage with Marie of Prussia, daughter of Albert Frederick, Duke of Prussia.

She was married according to the Roman Catholic rite into the Styrian noble family of Eggenberg on 23 October 1639 in Regensburg to Prince Johann Anton I von Eggenberg, Duke of Krumau, who subsequently received the opportunity to acquire the shire of Gorizia and Gradisca along the Adriatic coast two years later from his boyhood friend, Emperor Ferdinand III. The marriage ceremony had been negotiated by Christian Wilhelm von Brandenburg and prince Johann Anton I thereby secured for himself Brandenburg's support for his claim to a seat in the Imperial Diet. She demonstrated a strong character and conviction by holding on firmly to her family's Protestant faith in spite of her marriage to the son of Hans Ulrich von Eggenberg, chief minister of Emperor Ferdinand II, who had prosecuted the Counter-Reformation in the Habsburg hereditary lands as well as the Thirty Years' War.

Upon the early death of her husband in 1649 Anna Maria, together with her father and Wolf von Stubenberg held the guardianship of both underage sons, agreeing to remain in Habsburg hereditary lands and to raise them in the Catholic tradition, as well as administration of the Eggenberg possessions. This, as well as her extensive correspondence with her two sons, showed her to be a wise, circumspect and loving mother. During her guardianship, coins were minted featuring portraits of both sons at the mint in Český Krumlov Castle. The princess was also a significant patron supporting the construction of the pilgrimage church of Mary of the Snows (German: Maria Schnee Kirche, Czech: Svatý Kámen nad Malší) near Krumau (Czech: Český Krumlov) in Bohemia.

Having died unexpectedly at the young age of 39, Johann Anton I left his family with only a draft of a testament that was both unsigned and not notarized but left the bulk of the possessions to the eldest son. Princess Anna Maria refused to recognize the draft as legitimate and administered the Eggenberg possessions until 1664 when the two brothers took over control, though it wasn't until 1672 that they actually settled on a division of the possessions amongst themselves. Anna Maria further demonstrated her mothering instincts by going personally to the emperor himself to request that her daughter be compensated with an equivalent sum as a dowry.

Upon a visit to the town of Ödenburg (Hungarian: Sopron) in Hungary in 1670, she found the religious tolerance more open than in the staunchly Catholic Duchy of Styria and relocated her court in 1674 there to a small city palace, compared with the castle in Krumau or the Palais Herberstein, a city palace in Graz. In Sopron, she was allowed to hold Protestant services in her courtyard across the street from the former Protestant Church of St. George, which had previously been turned over to the Jesuits. That city palace in Sopron still bears her name as the Eggenberg House (Hungarian: Eggenberg-ház) and is still adorned with the coat of arms of the princes of Brandenburg-Bayreuth above the main gate and the Hohenzollern coat of arms beneath what was the pulpit above the courtyard. She died in this house on 8 May 1680 and is interred with her parents in the City Church (German: Stadtkirche) of Bayreuth.

== Issue ==
Name	Birth	Death	Spouse
Maria Elisabeth von Eggenberg, Fürstin of Eggenberg	1640	1715	Married 1656, Fürst Ferdinand Joseph, Prince of Dietrichstein (1636–1698)
Johann Christian I von Eggenberg, Fürst of Eggenberg	1641	1710	Married 1666, Prinzessin Maria Ernestina zu Schwarzenberg (1649–1719)
Maria Franziska	1643	1643	
Johann Seyfried von Eggenberg, Fürst of Eggenberg	1644	1713	Married 1666, Princess Maria Eleonora from and to Liechtenstein (1647–1704); Married 1704, Gräfin Maria Josepha von Orsini-Rosenberg (1690–1715)

== Ancestors ==
Ancestors of Anna Maria von Eggenberg, née Brandenburg-Bayreuth

8. Joachim II Hector, Elector of Brandenburg
4. John George, Elector of Brandenburg
9. Magdalena of Saxony
2. Christian, Margrave of Brandenburg-Bayreuth
10. Joachim Ernest, Prince of Anhalt
5. Elisabeth of Anhalt-Zerbst
11. Agnes of Barby-Mühlingen
1. Anna Maria von Eggenberg
12. Albert, Duke of Prussia
6. Albert Frederick, Duke of Prussia
13. Anna Marie of Brunswick-Lüneburg
3. Marie of Prussia, Margravine of Brandenburg-Bayreuth
14. William, Duke of Jülich-Cleves-Berg
7. Marie Eleonore of Cleves
15. Maria of Austria, Duchess of Jülich-Cleves-Berg

== Literature ==
- Barbara Kaiser. Schloss Eggenberg. Graz: Christian Brandstätter Verlag, 2006, p. 60. ISBN 3-902510-80-3 (available in German or English editions through the Universalmuseum Joanneum)
- Walther Ernest Heydendorff. Die Fürsten und Freiherren zu Eggenberg und ihre Vorfahren. Graz: Verlag Styria, 1965, pp. 161–163, 175–184.
- Christian von Stramberg, Anton Joseph Weidenbach. Denkwürdiger und nützlicher rheinischer Antiquarius: Welcher die wichtisten und angenehmsten geographischen, historischen und politischen Merkwürdigkeiten des ganzen Rheinstroms, von seinem Ausflusse in das Meer bis zu seinem Ursprunge darstellt, Band 1, Teil 4, R. F. Hergt, 1863, p. 413 ff.
