= Erdmuthe Sophie of Saxony =

German princess and composer (1644–1670)

Edrmuthe Sophie
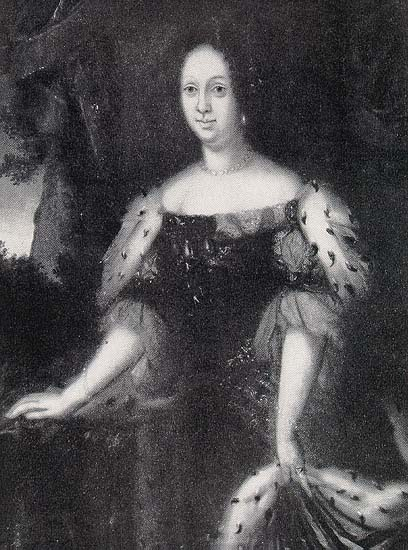

Margravine consort of Brandenburg-Bayreuth
- Tenure: 29 October 1662 – 22 June 1670
- Born: 25 February 1644; Dresden
- Died: 22 June 1670 (aged 26); Bayreuth
- Burial: Holy Trinity Parish Church, Bayreuth
- Spouse: Christian Ernst, Margrave of Brandenburg-Bayreuth (m. 1662)
- House: Wettin (Albertine line)
- Father: John George II, Elector of Saxony
- Mother: Magdalena Sibylle of Brandenburg-Bayreuth
- Religion: Lutheranism

Erdmuthe Sophie von Sachsen (born February 25, 1644, in Dresden; d. June 22, 1670, in Bayreuth) was a Saxon princess from the Albertine line of the House of Wettin and, through marriage, Margravine of Brandenburg-Bayreuth. She was also an author, historian, and hymn composer.

== Life ==
Erdmuthe Sophie was a daughter of Elector John George II of Saxony (1613–1680) from his marriage to Magdalena Sibylle (1612–1687), daughter of Margrave Christian of Brandenburg-Bayreuth. The princess received a very thorough and comprehensive education under the guidance of individuals such as the Lutheran orthodox theologian Jakob Weller. At the age of 11, Erdmuthe Sophie was already composing hymns and studying constitutional and church history.

She married Margrave Christian Ernst of Brandenburg-Bayreuth (1644–1712) on October 29, 1662, in Dresden. For the lavishly celebrated wedding, both the singspiel Sophia by Sigmund von Birken and the opera Il Paride (Italian; Paris) by Giovanni Andrea Bontempi premiered. As a wedding gift, Christian Ernst presented her with Colmdorf Castle.

In Bayreuth, Erdmuthe Sophie continued to engage intensively in scholarly studies and held a daily "history seminar" after devotions. Her first work, Handlung von der Welt Alter, des Heiligen Römischen Reichs Ständen, und derselben Beschaffenheit (A Treatise on the Ancient World, the Estates of the Holy Roman Empire, and Their Nature), represents an early work of the Enlightenment. In this work, which included a biblical chronology, tables of rulers, and a directory of important German educational institutions, she critically examined Calvinism.

The Margravine was considered one of the most educated women of her time.

She died at the age of 26 from a metabolic disorder and was buried in the Holy Trinity Parish Church in Bayreuth. The Sophienberg near Haag is named after her, where the Sophienburg Castle was built for the Margravine between 1663 and 1668.

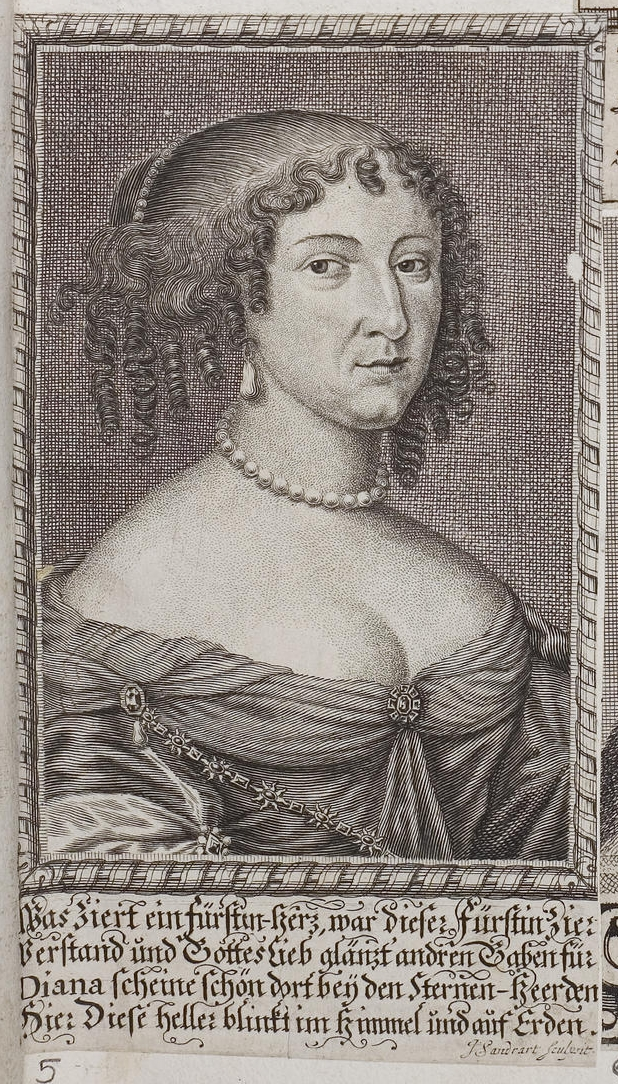
Erdmuthe Sophie of Saxony, Margravine of Brandenburg-Bayreuth, with a poem by Birken

The poet Sigmund von Birken, with whom she was associated, dedicated the following verse to her:

Poetize your goddesses, O Greeks! A heavenly one reveals herself here. God's love, dignity, intellect, virtue, grace, courage, and beauty — All adorn this heroine, with what one calls the ornaments of heaven. Fame! Praise the crown of the earth. Heaven! Crown her with prosperity.

== Works ==
- Handlung Von der Welt Alter, Des Heiligen Römischen Reichs Ständen, und derselben Beschaffenheit (, Bayreuth 1666, 2. Aufl. – Leipzig 1674;
- Sonderbare Kirchen-, Staat- und Weltsachen (Remarkable Matters of Church, State, and the World), Nürnberg 1676.

== In literature ==
- Uta Deppe: Die Festkultur am Dresdner Hofe Johann Georgs II. von Sachsen (1660-1679), Kiel 2006 (The Festive Culture at the Court of John George II of Saxony in Dresden)
- J.W. Holle: Die Fürstengrüfte der Hohenzollern zu Kulmbach, Bayreuth und Himmelkron (, Bayreuth 1845, 27f.
- Michael Peters: ERDMUTHE SOPHIA. In: Biographisch-Bi)bliographisches Kirchenlexikon (BBKL). Band 28, Bautz, Nordhausen 2007, ISBN 978-3-88309-413-7, Sp. 607–609
