= Marie, Margravine of Brandenburg-Bayreuth =

Prussian duchess (1579–1649)

Marie of Prussia
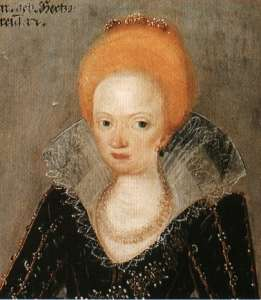
- Portrait by Heinrich Bollandt, c. 1610
- Born: 23 January 1579; Königsberg, Duchy of Prussia
- Died: 21 February 1649 (aged 70); Bayreuth, Principality of Bayreuth, Holy Roman Empire
- Spouse: Christian, Margrave of Brandenburg-Bayreuth (m. 1604)
- Issue Detail: Anna Maria, Princess of Eggenberg; Magdalene Sibylle, Electress of Saxony; Erdmann August, Hereditary Prince of Brandenburg-Bayreuth; Georg Albrecht, Margrave of Brandenburg-Bayreuth
- House: Hohenzollern
- Father: Albert Frederick, Duke of Prussia
- Mother: Marie Eleonore of Cleves

Marie of Prussia (23 January 1579 – 21 February 1649) was a Prussian duchess by birth and Margravine of Brandenburg-Bayreuth by marriage.

== Life ==
Born in Königsberg, Marie was the second daughter of Duke Albert Frederick of Prussia (1553–1618) from his marriage to Marie Eleonore of Cleves (1550–1608), daughter of Duke William the Rich of Jülich-Cleves-Berg. The princess grew up with her sisters in Königsberg Castle.

On 29 April 1604, she married Margrave Christian of Brandenburg-Bayreuth (1581–1655) in Plassenburg Castle. Since her father left no male heirs, a dispute arose between Prussia and Jülich-Cleves-Berg about Mary's compensation. In 1613, Marie acquired the manors of Schreez and Culmbach in Haag (Oberfranken). She used the income from these manors to expand Unternschreez Castle, her Wittum. Mary and her family in Franconia had to flee their homes during the Thirty Years' War, and the manors were lost.

Marie died in 1649 and was buried in the City Church in Bayreuth; she had donated the high altar in this church.

== Offspring ==
From her marriage, Marie had the following children:

- Margravine Elisabeth Eleonore of Brandenburg-Bayreuth (born and died 1606)
- Margrave George Frederick of Brandenburg-Bayreuth (born and died 1608)
- Margravine Anna Maria of Brandenburg-Bayreuth (1609–1680); married in 1639 Prince Johann Anton I von Eggenberg (1610-1649)
- Margravine Magdalene Sibylle of Brandenburg-Bayreuth (1612–1687); married in 1638 John George II of Saxony (1613-1680)
- Margravine Agnes Sophie of Brandenburg-Bayreuth (born and died 1611)
- Margrave Christian Ernest of Brandenburg-Bayreuth (1613–1614)
- Erdmann August (1615–1651), Hereditary Prince of Brandenburg-Bayreuth; married in 1641 princess Sophie of Brandenburg-Ansbach (1614-1646)
- Georg Albrecht (1619–1666), (not ruling) Margrave of Brandenburg-Kulmbach (junior line); married firstly in 1651 Princess Marie Elisabeth of Holstein-Sonderburg-Glücksburg (1628-1664). Married secondly in 1665 Countess Marie Sophie of Solms-Baruth (1626-1688)
- Margrave Frederick William of Brandenburg-Bayreuth (born and died 1620)

== Ancestry ==
Ancestors of Marie, Margravine of Brandenburg-Bayreuth

8. Frederick I, Margrave of Brandenburg-Ansbach
4. Albert, Duke of Prussia
9. Sophia of Poland
2. Albert Frederick, Duke of Prussia
10. Eric I, Duke of Brunswick-Lüneburg
5. Anna Marie of Brunswick-Lüneburg
11. Elisabeth of Brandenburg
1. Marie, Margravine of Brandenburg-Bayreuth
12. John III, Duke of Cleves
6. William, Duke of Jülich-Cleves-Berg
13. Maria, Duchess of Jülich-Berg
3. Marie Eleonore of Cleves
14. Ferdinand I, Holy Roman Emperor
7. Archduchess Maria of Austria
15. Anne of Bohemia and Hungary

Marie, Margravine of Brandenburg-Bayreuth House of Hohenzollern Born: 23 January 1579 Died: 21 February 1649
German nobility
New title	Margravine of Brandenburg-Bayreuth; 1604 – 21 February 1649	Vacant Title next held by Erdmuthe Sophie of Saxony
