= House Treaty of Gera =

The House Treaty of Gera was a house law of the House of Hohenzollern on the succession in Brandenburg and in the Franconian territories at the end of the sixteenth century binding rules. The Treaty and came about because Elector John George of Brandenburg had violated the requirements made in Dispositio Achillea in his will. In these provisions, the indivisibility of the Mark of Brandenburg has been prescribed as a mandatory principle of succession. John George, however, had stipulated his will that part of the Neumark and Krosno Odrzańskie should be separated from the Mark and given to his two younger sons.

== History ==
Immediately after John George's death in 1598, his eldest son and successor, Elector Joachim Frederick contested the will and consulted with Margrave George Frederick I. He was the last descendant of the elder branch of the Franconian Hohenzollerns and ruled the two margraviates of Brandenburg-Ansbach and Brandenburg-Kulmbach. George Frederick had no offspring of his own. This consultation led to the House Treaty of Gera: Joachim Frederick would inherit the whole Mark of Brandenburg (immediately) and his younger brothers would inherit the Franconian principalities (after George Frederick's death). The younger brothers had to renounce their claims that were based on John George's invalid will.

After the House Treaty of Gera was finally accepted by all parties concerned, it was ratified on 29 April 1599 in Magdeburg. The most important paragraph of the agreement was that each Elector of Brandenburg should always inherit the entire and undivided Mark, because this was considered an integral part of the Electoral dignity. The indivisibility of the Mark of Brandenburg that was already prescribed in the Dispositio Achillea, was renewed and reaffirmed. John George's younger sons were compensated with the succession of the Franconian possessions of the Hohenzollerns. After George Frederick's death, they would receive both his Margraviates as hereditary secundogenitures. To decide who would inherit which principality, they would have to draw lots among themselves, as had been the practice before the Dispositio Achillea.
