= Samson Baiersdorf =

Court Jew (d.1712)

Samson Solomon ben Manasse Baiersdorf
- Died: 1712
- Occupation: Court Jew
- Employer: Margrave Christian Ernst of Brandenburg-Bayreuth
- Known for: Influential Court Jew; securing commercial freedoms and privileges for the Jewish community of Bayreuth
- Parent: Juda Selka

Samson Solomon ben Manasse Baiersdorf (d. 1712) was a prominent Court Jew (Hofjude) of margrave Christian Ernst of Brandenburg-Bayreuth. Serving from 1670, he used his position to secure key protections and commercial freedoms for the Jewish community, including the 1695 trade decree and the formation of the 1709 Jewish corporation. Despite periods of opposition and later accusations, he remained a central figure in Jewish communal affairs.

== Biography ==
Samson Baiersdorf was the son of Juda Selka, who arrived in Fiurda following the expulsion of the Jews from Vienna by Leopold I in 1670.

Baiersdorf entered the margrave's service in 1670, becoming highly esteemed at Ernst's court, at the same time using his influence for the good of his coreligionists. He influenced the margrave to issue a decree in 1695 granting the Jews freedom of trade, and it was chiefly through his influence that they were allowed to stay in the land in peace. In 1700, for a short time his position at the court was shaken by a hostile counselor of the margrave, but it was soon re-established. In the same year he gave his daughter in marriage to a son of Glückel of Hameln, Moses Hameln, who became later on rabbi at Baiersdorf.

Under Baiersdorf's influence, a 'Jews' corporation' was organized in the Margraviate of Bayreuth in 1709 which bought additional privileges in regard to rabbinical jurisdiction and to establish two cemeteries. In 1714 Baiersdorf was calumniated by the baptized Jew Philipp Ernst Christfels, and engaged in a lawsuit, the issue of which is not known.
