= Christian Ernst, Margrave of Brandenburg-Bayreuth =

German Nobility (1644–1712)

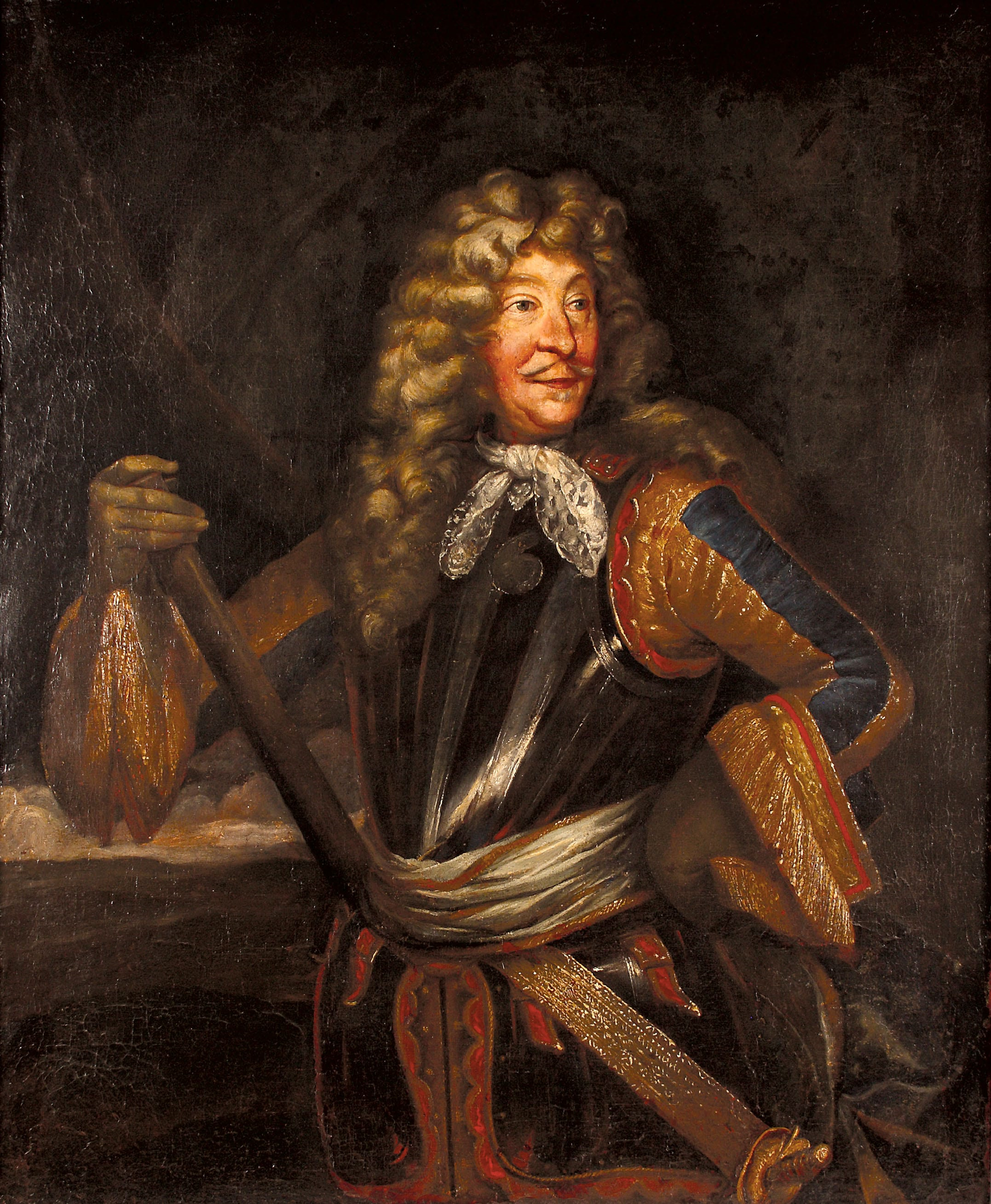
- Portrait, late 17th/early 18th century
- Born: 6 August 1644; Bayreuth
- Died: 20 May 1712 (aged 67); Erlangen
- Spouse: Erdmuthe Sophie of Saxony (m. 1662; died 1670) Sophie Luise of Württemberg (m. 1671; died 1702) Elisabeth Sophie of Brandenburg (m. 1703)
- Issue: Christiane Eberhardine of Brandenburg-Bayreuth; George William, Margrave of Brandenburg-Bayreuth
- House: House of Hohenzollern
- Father: Erdmann August of Brandenburg-Bayreuth
- Mother: Sophie of Brandenburg-Ansbach

Christian Ernst of Brandenburg-Bayreuth (6 August 1644 in Bayreuth – 20 May 1712 in Erlangen) was a member of the House of Hohenzollern and Margrave of Brandenburg-Bayreuth.

He was the only son of Erdmann August, Hereditary Margrave (Erbmarkgraf) of Brandenburg-Bayreuth, by his wife and first cousin, Sophie of Brandenburg-Ansbach.

The death of his father (6 February 1651) made Christian Ernst the new heir to the margraviate of Bayreuth. At the age of ten, he succeeded his grandfather Christian as margrave when he died on 30 May 1655. His uncle Georg Albrecht acted as regent until 1664, when Christian Ernst was declared an adult and assumed the government of his principality.

== Life ==
Christian Ernst took bold decisions in centralizing the regional authorities in Bayreuth, settling Huguenots in Erlangen, and creating a Knight's Academy (German: Ritterakademie), the basis for the Regional University of Erlangen (German: Landesuniversität Erlangen).

As margrave, he served Holy Roman Emperor Leopold I, whom he supported with war supplies during wars against France in support of the Dutch Republic and Lorraine and the liberation of Vienna from the Turks. On 12 February 1664 he was designated a colonel of the Franconian Circle. From 1668 the arming of his own dominion (which was intended originally to aid the emperor) strained state finances and exposed Bayreuth to military dangers. The principality suffered the first of several financial crises in 1672.

The military ambitions of Christian Ernst made him an important political ally in spite of the small territories that he ruled. After supporting the Emperor in the Franco-Dutch War, he was appointed a Lieutenant Field Marshal (Generalfeldmarschallleutnant) on 27 March 1676. In the liberation of Vienna from the Turks in 1683, Christian Ernst was a participant in the relief army.

In 1691 he was appointed Imperial Field Marshal (Kaiserlicher Generalfeldmarschall) and took command of the imperial army stationed on the Rhine in 1692. He realized that he was not up to the task, and so he resigned the command to Louis William, Margrave of Baden-Baden. During the War of the Spanish Succession he obtained some victories, but made a fatal mistake on 22 May 1707 that made it possible for French troops to enter Swabia and Bavaria. Thereafter his military career was destroyed.

Christian Ernst was also an advocate and benefactor of the arts and education. As a successor for the Latin School of Bayreuth (Bayreuther Lateinschule) he endowed a secondary school in 1664 that still carries his name, the Christian Ernst Secondary School (Christian-Ernst-Gymnasium). On the square near his stables he built a castle church in 1672. In 1695 the architect Leonhard Dientzenhofer began construction of the octagonal castle tower. In 1686 he allowed Huguenots expelled by Louis XIV to reside in Neustadt; soon after he also permitted refugees from the Palatinate, which was devastated in the Palatinate War of Succession, to reside in Erlangen.

In his private life, the margrave was a lover of horses and dogs (he possessed 85 of the latter).

== Marriages and Issue ==
In Dresden on 29 October 1662, Christian Ernst was married to Erdmuthe Sophie, only surviving daughter of his paternal aunt, Magdalene Sibylle, and her husband John George II, Elector of Saxony. After seven years of childless union, Erdmuthe Sophie, his first wife and first cousin, died on 22 June 1670.

Eight months after the death of his first wife, Christian Ernst was married a second time in Stuttgart on 8 February 1671 to Duchess Sophie Luise of Württemberg, his maternal second cousin, the eldest daughter of Eberhard III, Duke of Württemberg. His second marriage lasted 31 years. They had six children, three of whom died in infancy:

1. Christiane Eberhardine (Bayreuth, 29 December 1671 – Schloss Pretzsch, 5 September 1727); married on 20 January 1693 to Frederick August of Saxony, later Augustus the Strong, Elector of Saxony and King of Poland.
2. Eleonore Magdalene (Bayreuth, 24 January 1673 – Ettlingen, 13 December 1711); married on 8 September 1704 to Prince Herman Friedrich of Hohenzollern-Hechingen, son of Philipp, Prince of Hohenzollern-Hechingen.
3. Claudia Eleonore Sophie (Bayreuth, 4 July 1675 – Bayreuth, 11 February 1676).
4. Charlotte Emilie (Bayreuth, 4 June 1677 – Bayreuth, 15 February 1678).
5. Georg Wilhelm (Bayreuth, 26 November 1678 – Bayreuth, 18 December 1726), successor of his father as Margrave of Bayreuth.
6. Karl Ludwig (Bayreuth, 21 November 1679 – Bayreuth, 7 April 1680).

In Potsdam on 30 March 1703 (five months after the death of his second wife), Christian Ernst married thirdly Elisabeth Sophie of Brandenburg. The marriage was childless.

== Ancestors ==
Ancestors of Christian Ernst, Margrave of Brandenburg-Bayreuth

8. John George, Elector of Brandenburg (= 12.)
4. Christian, Margrave of Brandenburg-Bayreuth
9. Princess Elisabeth of Anhalt-Zerbst (= 13.)
2. Erdmann August, Margrave of Brandenburg-Bayreuth
10. Albert Frederick, Duke of Prussia
5. Duchess Marie of Prussia
11. Duchess Marie Eleonore of Cleves
1.Christian Ernst, Margrave of Brandenburg-Bayreuth
12. John George, Elector of Brandenburg (= 8.)
6. Joachim Ernst, Margrave of Brandenburg-Ansbach
13. Princess Elisabeth of Anhalt-Zerbst (= 9.)
3. Margravine Sophie of Brandenburg-Ansbach
14. John George I, Count of Solms-Laubach
7. Countess Sophie of Solms-Laubach
15. Margaret of Schönburg-Glauchau

Christian Ernst, Margrave of Brandenburg-Bayreuth House of Hohenzollern Born: 6 August 1644 Died: 20 May 1712
| Preceded by Christian | Margrave of Brandenburg-Bayreuth; 1655 – 1712 | Succeeded by George William |
