= Secundogeniture =

Younger son as vassal of dependent land

A secundogeniture (from Latin: secundus 'following, second', and genitus 'born') was a dependent territory given to a younger son of a princely house and his descendants, creating a cadet branch. This was a special form of inheritance in which the second and younger son received more possessions and prestige than the apanage which was usual in principalities practising primogeniture. It avoided the generational division of the estate to the extent that occurred under gavelkind, and at the same time gave younger branches a stake in the stability of the house.

In the rare cases in which the beneficiary was the third son in the order of succession, the second being already the holder of a secundogeniture, the domain given as a benefit was called a tertiogeniture.

== Creation ==
The creation of a secundogeniture was often regulated by a house law. The younger sons would receive some territory, but much less than the older brother, and they would not be sovereign. Examples of such house laws would be

- the House Treaty of Gera in Brandenburg
- the testament of John George I of Saxony and the Freundbrüderliche Hauptvergleich of 1657, in which John George I's sons regulated the details.

A secundogeniture is different from a partition. A partition creates two (or more) separate, largely independent states. An example of a partition would be the division of Hesse after the death of Philip I of Hesse. Nevertheless, there have been intermediate cases between a secundogeniture and a proper partition.

=== Examples ===
- Arsacid Dynasty of Armenia in 63 AD
- Brandenburg-Küstrin
- Brandenburg-Schwedt
- Duchy of Modena and Reggio under the House of Austria-Este (a tertiogeniture)
- Grand Duchy of Tuscany under the House of Habsburg-Lorraine
- Hesse-Homburg
- Landgraviate of Hesse-Rotenburg
- Palatinate-Birkenfeld
- Palatinate-Sulzbach
- Saxe-Merseburg
- Saxe-Weissenfels
- Saxe-Zeitz
- Schleswig-Holstein-Sonderburg
- Württemberg-Mömpelgard
- King Wu of Zhou

== See also ==
- Partitioned-off duke
