= Ordre de la Concorde =

First order of chivalry in Bayreuth

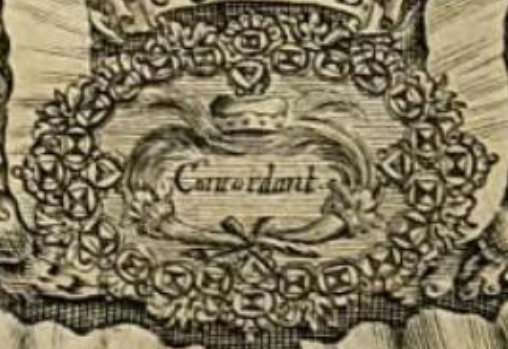
Badge of the Ordre de la Concorde on a contemporary engraving (1668)

The Ordre de la Concorde, German: Orden der Eintracht, was instituted in 1660 by Christian Ernst, Margrave of Brandenburg-Bayreuth, during his Grand Tour in Bourdeaux. The reason for the foundation was the Treaty of the Pyrenees in 1659.

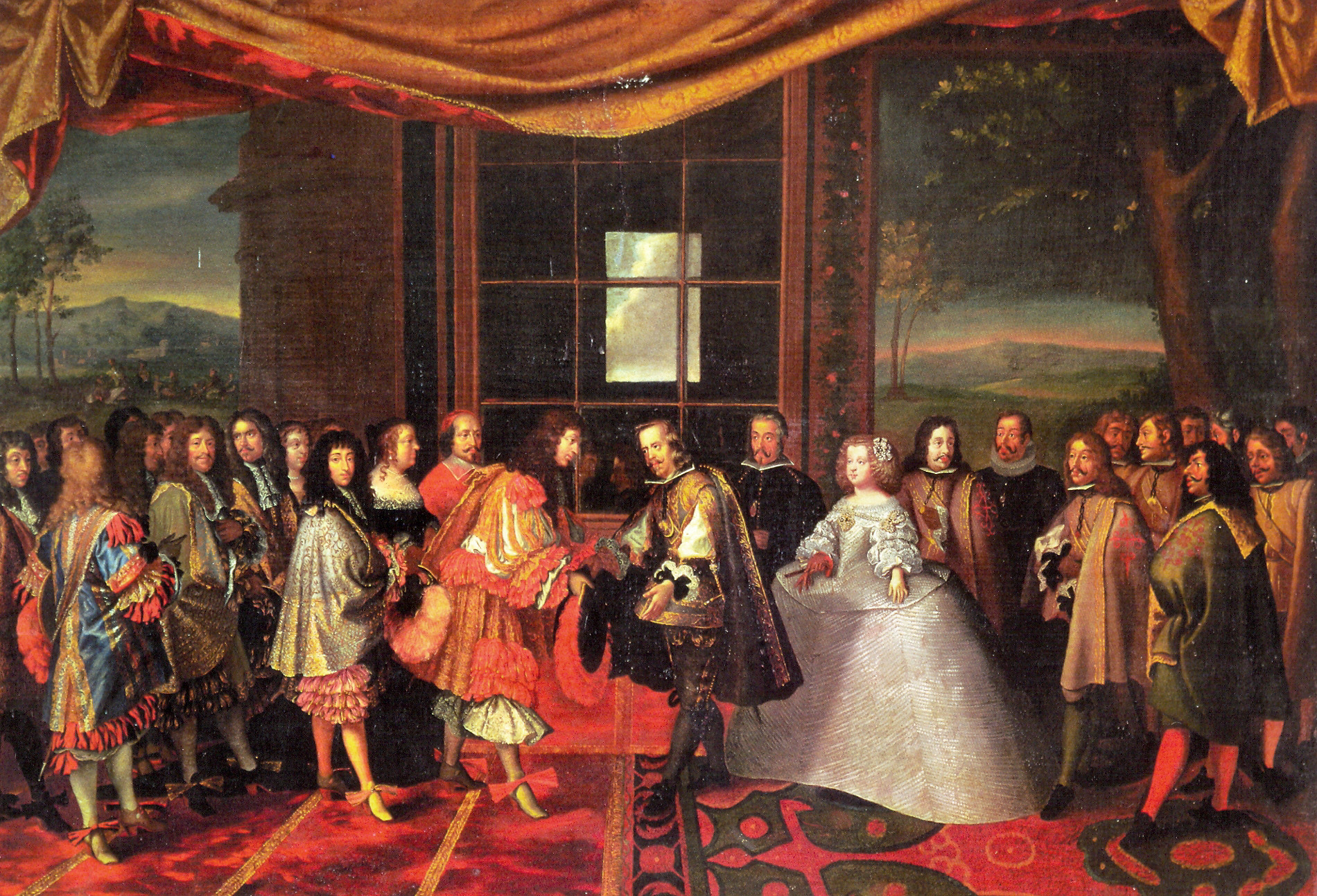
Meeting on the Isle of Pheasants

Christian Ernst had attended the Meeting on the Isle of Pheasants of Louis XIV of France and Philip IV of Spain, where the Orders of the Golden Fleece, Santiago, Calatrava and Alcántara and the cordon bleu, worn by the of the Spaniards and the Frenchmen respectively, are said to have inspired him to found his own order of chivalry.

The badge of the order was a wreath of diamonds set in gold around a gold medal with the motto Concordant. The motto was surrounded by two green enamelled olive branches, each passing through a golden crown and touching under a princely hat. The lapel showed the letters C E M Z B (Christian Ernst Margrave of Bayreuth) surmounted by an elector's hat. The medal was worn on a blue ribbon on the left arm.

The order initially had little significance. It was only after the foundation of the Ordre de la Sincérité by Prince Georg Wilhelm in 1705 that Christian Ernst decided to renew the order in 1710. The new was of the order was, in the style of the Order of the Black Eagle and the de la Générosité, a blue enamelled Maltese cross with two black and two red eagles between the arms of the cross. the central disc bore the letters C E E S, both the monogram of Christian Ernst and his wife Elisabeth Sophie of Brandenburg, as well as the new motto of the Order Constante et éternelle Sincérité (Constant and Eternal Sincerity). The newly chosen motto was also intended to replace the Ordre de la Sincérité.

With the death of the founder in 1712, however, no more awards were made and instead the Ordre de la Sincérité (since 1734 the Order of the Red Eagle) became the highest knightly order in the Principality of Bayreuth.
