= Schwerin (disambiguation) =

Schwerin is the capital city of the German state of Mecklenburg-Vorpommern.

Schwerin may also refer to:

- Alt Schwerin, a municipality in Mecklenburg
- Prince-Bishopric of Schwerin, a former Roman Catholic diocese and a state of the Holy Roman Empire
- Schwerin Castle, located in Schwerin in Mecklenburg
- Mecklenburg-Schwerin (disambiguation), various places
- Schwerin, Brandenburg, a small town
- Schwerin, a former municipality, now a component part of Storkow, Brandenburg
- Schwerin an der Warthe, the German name of Skwierzyna, Poland
- Schwerin in Posen district, a former district of Prussia, seated in Schwerin upon Warthe
- Schwerin region, a former subdivision of East Germany
- Schwerin, Kreis Regenwalde, now Zwierzynek, West Pomeranian Voivodeship

== People with the surname ==
- Kurt Christoph Graf von Schwerin (1684–1757), Prussian Field Marshal
- Lutz Graf Schwerin von Krosigk (1887–1977), Chancellor of Germany
- Ulrich Wilhelm Graf Schwerin von Schwanenfeld (1902–1944), German resistance fighter
- Gerhard von Schwerin (1899–1980), World War II German General
- Fritz Kurt Alexander von Schwerin (1847–1925), botanist whose name is abbreviated as "Schwer."
