= Johann Georg Lairitz =

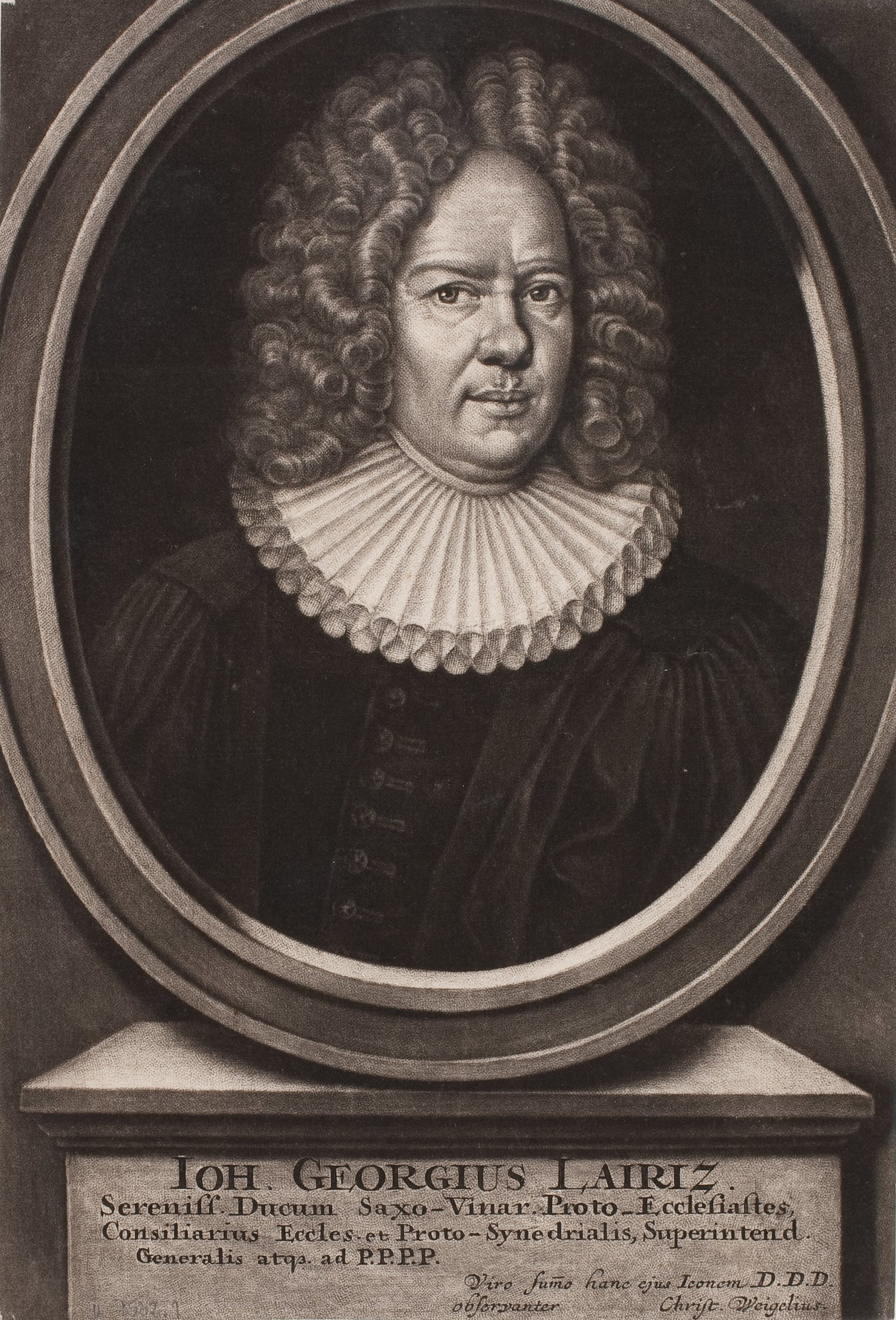
- Born: 15 July 1647; Hof
- Died: 4 April 1716 (aged 68); Weimar
- Alma mater: University of Jena
- Occupation: Historian; librarian; deacon; theologian

Johann Georg Lairitz (15 July 1647 – 4 April 1716) was a German theologian, born at Hof in Bavaria. In 1667, he entered the university at Jena; in 1677, he graduated with an M.A., and in 1673, became professor of church and profane history at the gymnasium of Baireuth. In 1675, he became librarian and instructor of the margraves Erdmann Philipp and Georg Albrecht; in 1685, he became deacon of the court Church; in 1688, he became superintendent at Neustadt. In 1697, he accepted the call of the duke Wilhelm Ernst of Weimar, and he then became superintendent in general, counselor of the consistory, first preacher of the Petri-Paul Church, and director of the gymnasium.

He died on 4 April 1716.

He left numerous productions, e.g. Diss. de simplici et composito (Jenae, 1668, 4to); Auszug der Kirchengeschichte des Neuen Testam. (Baireuth und Niremb. 1678, 12mo); Synopsis historiae ecclesiasticae Novi Testam. (ibid. 1678, 12mo); Der römische Papst-Thron, d. i. gründliche und ausführliche Beschreibung des papstlichen Ehrund Macht-und Wachsthums (ibid, 1685, 4to).
