= Christian, Margrave of Brandenburg-Bayreuth =

Christian
- Margrave of Brandenburg-Bayreuth
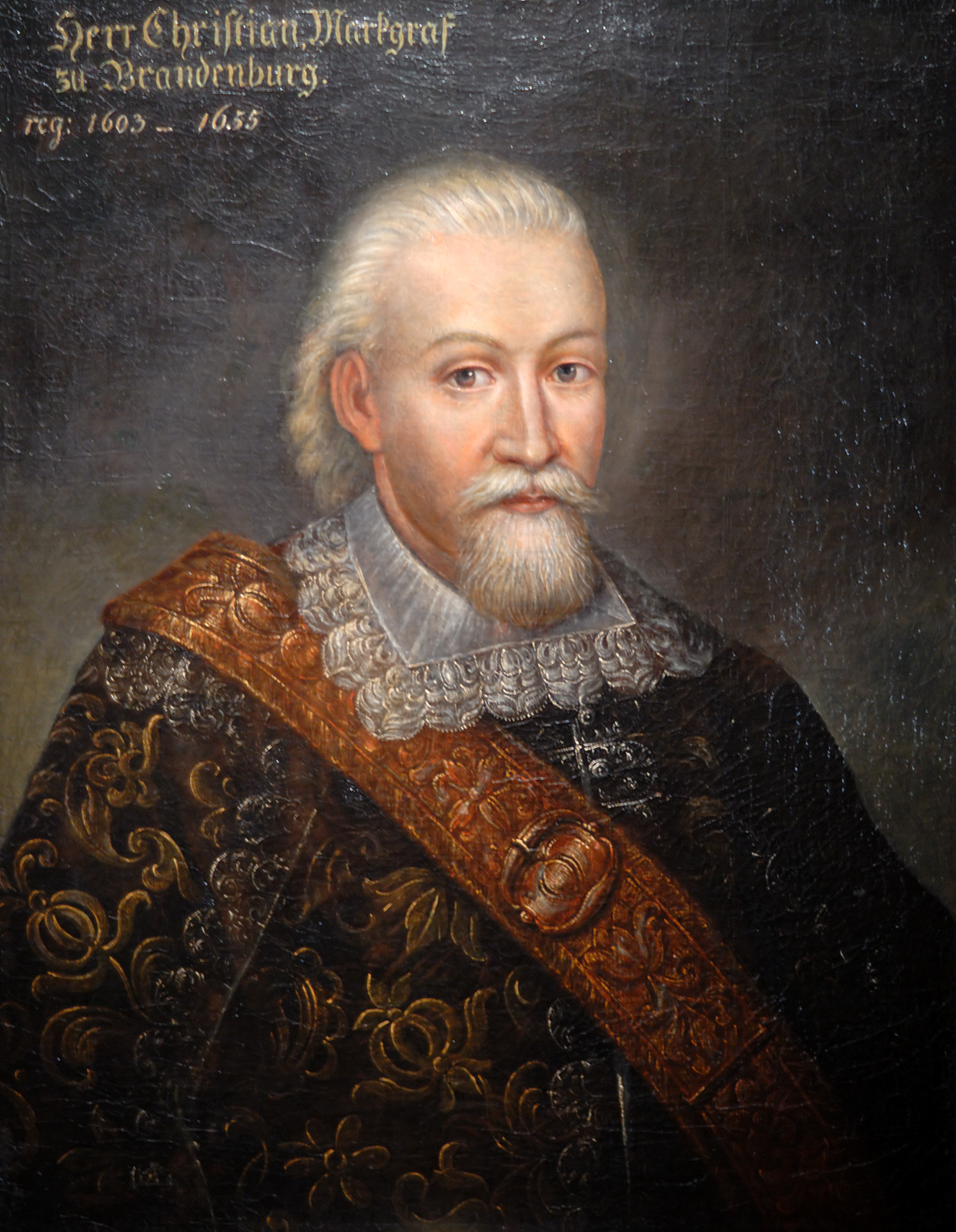
- Portrait at Plassenburg, 17th century
- Born: 30 January 1581; Cölln, Berlin, Margraviate of Brandenburg, Holy Roman Empire
- Died: 30 May 1655 (aged 74); Bayreuth, Principality of Bayreuth, Holy Roman Empire
- Spouse: Marie of Prussia (m. 1604; died 1649)
- Issue Detail: Anna Maria, Princess of Eggenberg; Magdalene Sibylle, Electress of Saxony; Erdmann August, Hereditary Prince of Brandenburg-Bayreuth; Georg Albrecht, Margrave of Brandenburg-Bayreuth
- House: Hohenzollern
- Father: John George, Elector of Brandenburg
- Mother: Elisabeth of Anhalt-Zerbst

Christian, Margrave of Brandenburg-Bayreuth (30 January 1581 in Cölln – 30 May 1655 in Bayreuth) was created as Margrave of Brandenburg-Kulmbach-Bayreuth in 1603, following the death of George Frederick, Margrave of Brandenburg-Ansbach. From 1604, he initiated the transfer of the residence and authority from Kulmbach to Bayreuth, which was completed in 1642.

He was the eldest of eleven children born to John George, Elector of Brandenburg by his third wife Princess Elisabeth of Anhalt-Zerbst.

== Life ==
The death of the childless George Frederick the Elder in 1603 marked the extinction of the original Franconian line of the Margraves of Brandenburg-Ansbach-Kulmbach. Christian inherited Kulmbach and his younger brother Joachim Ernst received Ansbach.

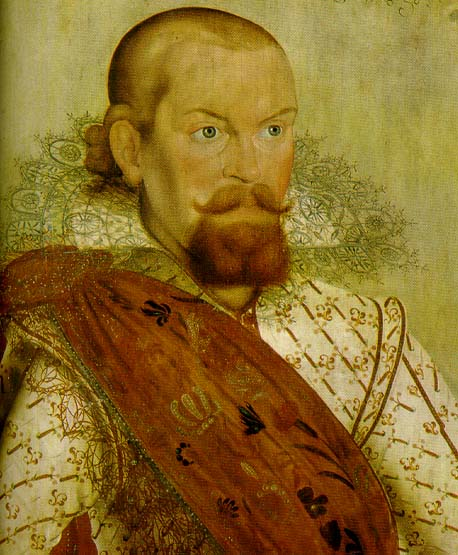
Portrait of Christian by Heinrich Bollandt, c. 1618

This land partition had already been legitimized in 1598 by the House Treaty of Gera, which was prepared for this purpose. Christian's assumption of the government of Kulmbach took place at the same time as that of Joachim Ernst in Ansbach. In 1604 Christian moved the seat of power from Kulmbach to Bayreuth and Plassenburg, however Kulmbach was retained as a regional fortress. From that moment, the principality changed its name from Brandenburg-Kulmbach to Brandenburg-Bayreuth.

In 1606, Christian was elected Colonel (German: Kreisobrist) of the Franconian Circle. He was also one of the founders of the Protestant Union and formed an alliance during the Thirty Years' War with Sweden. Emperor Ferdinand II tried to depose him as ruler of Bayreuth in 1635; however, he continued in office.

== Family and children ==
In Plassenburg on 29 April 1604, Christian married Marie, daughter of Albert Frederick, Duke of Prussia. They had nine children:

1. Elisabeth Eleonore (b. Plassenburg, 19 October 1606 – d. Plassenburg, 20 October 1606) died in infancy.
2. Georg Frederick (b. and d. Kulmbach, 23 March 1608) died at birth.
3. Anna Maria (b. Bayreuth, 30 December 1609 – d. Ödenburg, 8 May 1680); married on 23 October 1639 to Prince Johann Anton I von Eggenberg.
4. Agnes Sophie (b. Bayreuth, 19 July 1611 – d. Bayreuth, 1 December 1611) died in infancy.
5. Magdalene Sibylle (b. Bayreuth, 27 October 1612 – d. Dresden, 20 March 1687); married on 13 November 1638 to Elector John George II of Saxony.
6. Christian Ernst (b. Bayreuth, 18 November 1613 – d. Bayreuth, 4 February 1614) died in infancy.
7. Erdmann August (b. Bayreuth, 8 October 1615 – d. Hof, 6 February 1651), Hereditary Margrave (German: Erbmarkgraf) of Brandenburg-Bayreuth.
8. Georg Albrecht (b. Bayreuth, 20 March 1619 – d. Schretz, 27 September 1666), inherited Kulmbach but never reigned.
9. Frederick Wilhelm (b. Bayreuth, 11 May 1620 – d. Bayreuth, 12 May 1620) died in infancy.

== Ancestry ==
Ancestors of Christian, Margrave of Brandenburg-Bayreuth

8. Joachim I Nestor, Elector of Brandenburg
4. Joachim II Hector, Elector of Brandenburg
9. Elizabeth of Denmark
2. John George, Elector of Brandenburg
10. George, Duke of Saxony
5. Magdalena of Saxony
11. Barbara Jagiellon
1. Christian, Margrave of Brandenburg-Bayreuth
12. John V, Prince of Anhalt-Zerbst
6. Joachim Ernest, Prince of Anhalt
13. Margaret of Brandenburg
3. Elisabeth of Anhalt-Zerbst
14. Wolfgang I, Count of Barby
7. Agnes of Barby-Mühlingen
15. Agnes of Mansfeld-Mittelort

== See also ==
- Ordre de la Concorde

Christian, Margrave of Brandenburg-Bayreuth House of Hohenzollern Born: 30 January 1581 Died: 30 May 1655
Preceded by Georg Friedrich	Margrave of Brandenburg-Kulmbach; 1603–1604	Succeeded by Seat of title moved to Bayreuth
Preceded by Himself as Margrave of Brandenburg-Kulmbach	Margrave of Brandenburg-Bayreuth; 1604–1655	Succeeded by Christian Ernst
