= Erdmann August, Hereditary Prince of Brandenburg-Bayreuth =

Erdmann August of Brandenburg-Bayreuth
- Hereditary Prince of Brandenburg-Bayreuth
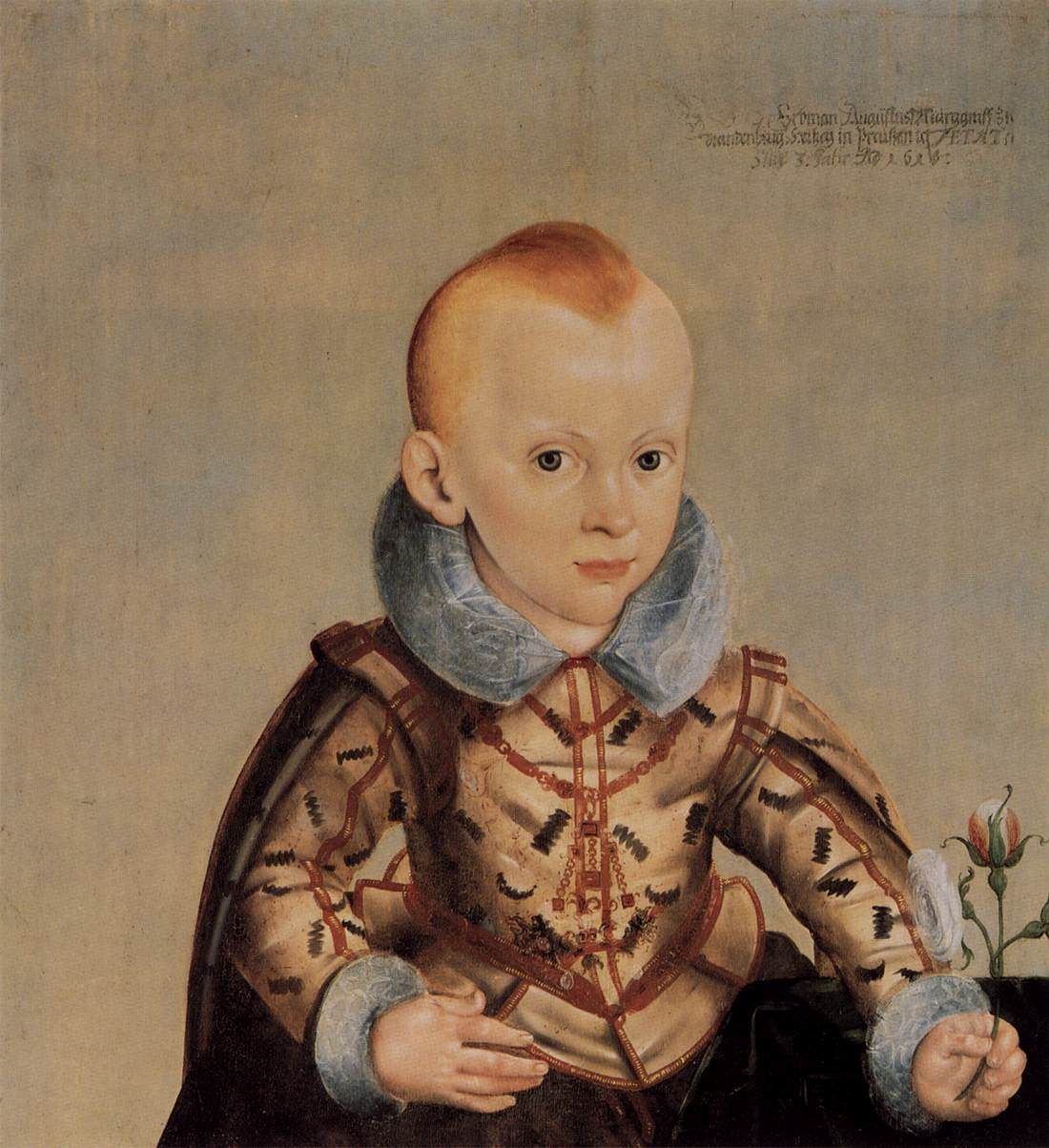
- Portrait of Erdmann August, Hereditary Prince of Brandenburg-Bayreuth by Heinrich Bollandt
- Born: 8 October 1615; Bayreuth
- Died: 6 February 1651 (aged 35); Hof
- Spouse: Sophie of Brandenburg-Ansbach
- Issue: Christian Ernst, Margrave of Brandenburg-Bayreuth
- House: House of Hohenzollern
- Father: Christian, Margrave of Brandenburg-Bayreuth
- Mother: Marie of Prussia

Erdmann August, Hereditary Prince of Brandenburg-Bayreuth (8 October 1615 – 6 February 1651), was a member of the House of Hohenzollern and Hereditary prince (German: Erbprinz) of Brandenburg-Bayreuth.

== Biography ==
He was the seventh of the nine children of Christian, Margrave of Brandenburg-Bayreuth by his wife, Marie of Prussia. In fact, he was the third-born son but the only one to survive into adulthood; his two older brothers Georg Frederick (b. and d. 1608) and Christian Ernst (b. 1613 – d. 1614) died long before his own birth.

== Marriage and issue ==
In Ansbach on 8 December 1641, Erdmann August married the Margravine Sophie of Brandenburg-Ansbach, who was also his first cousin (daughter of Joachim Ernst, Margrave of Brandenburg-Ansbach, his father's brother). They had only one son:

1. Christian Ernst (b. Bayreuth, 6 August 1644 – d. Erlangen, 20 May 1712), who became Margrave of Brandenburg-Bayreuth.

== Death ==
Sophie died on 3 December 1646. Erdmann August himself died four years later, aged thirty-five, in the middle of the preparations of his wedding with Duchess Sophie Agnes of Mecklenburg-Schwerin. Because he predeceased his father, his son Christian Ernst succeeded as Margrave of Brandenburg-Bayreuth in 1655. Following his death, Erdmann August was interred alongside his wife, Sophie, in the Royal Crypt of the Stadtkirche in Bayreuth.
