= House Treaty of Regensburg =

The House Treaty of Regensburg was a treaty concluded on 23 July 1541 between two branches of the House of Hohenzollern, defining the boundaries between the newly created principalities of Ansbach and Kulmbach. These two territories had been created when in 1486 the Burgraviate of Nuremberg (the Hohenzollern's Franconian possessions) had been divided according to the Dispositio Achillea.

The Burgraviate of Nuremberg consisted of a lower part around Ansbach and an upper part around Bayreuth and Kulmbach, separated by the Muggendorfer Mountains – the term used back then for the mountain range now called Little Switzerland.

At the 1486 division, the lower part of the Burgraviate was awarded to Frederick I and the upper part to his brother Siegmund. This division took the geographical conditions into account, but not the economic possibilities of the two new principalities. The soil in the lower part of the Burgraviate was more fertile and this led to Frederick receiving significantly more revenue than his brother. The House Treaty of Regensburg eliminated the imbalance by re-dividing the burgraviate into two economically equivalent territories. To this end, some towns in the lower part (Erlangen and Neustadt an der Aisch) were assigned to Brandenburg-Kulmbach. To determine the economic power of the areas, the average revenue from 1533 to 1539 was used.

Another clause of the treaty stipulated that the Electorate of Brandenburg was indivisible. This principle had already been formulated in the Dispositio Achillea, and was made part of the Hohenzollern house law by this treaty.

The immediate cause for the treaty was that Albert Alcibiades took up government in Kulmbach. He had inherited Kulmbach after the untimely death of his father, Casimir and had been raised by his uncle and guardian Margrave George in Ansbach. When Albert Alcibiades came of age, he and George agreed to realign their borders and concluded the Treaty of Regensburg.
