= Heinrich Bollandt =

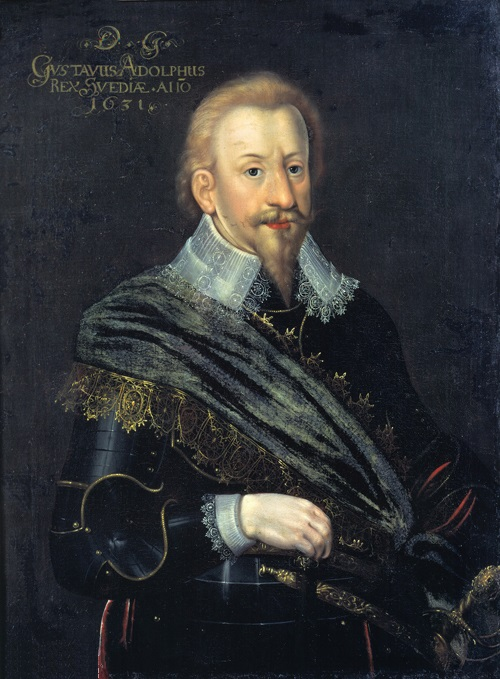
Gustavus Adolphus (1631)

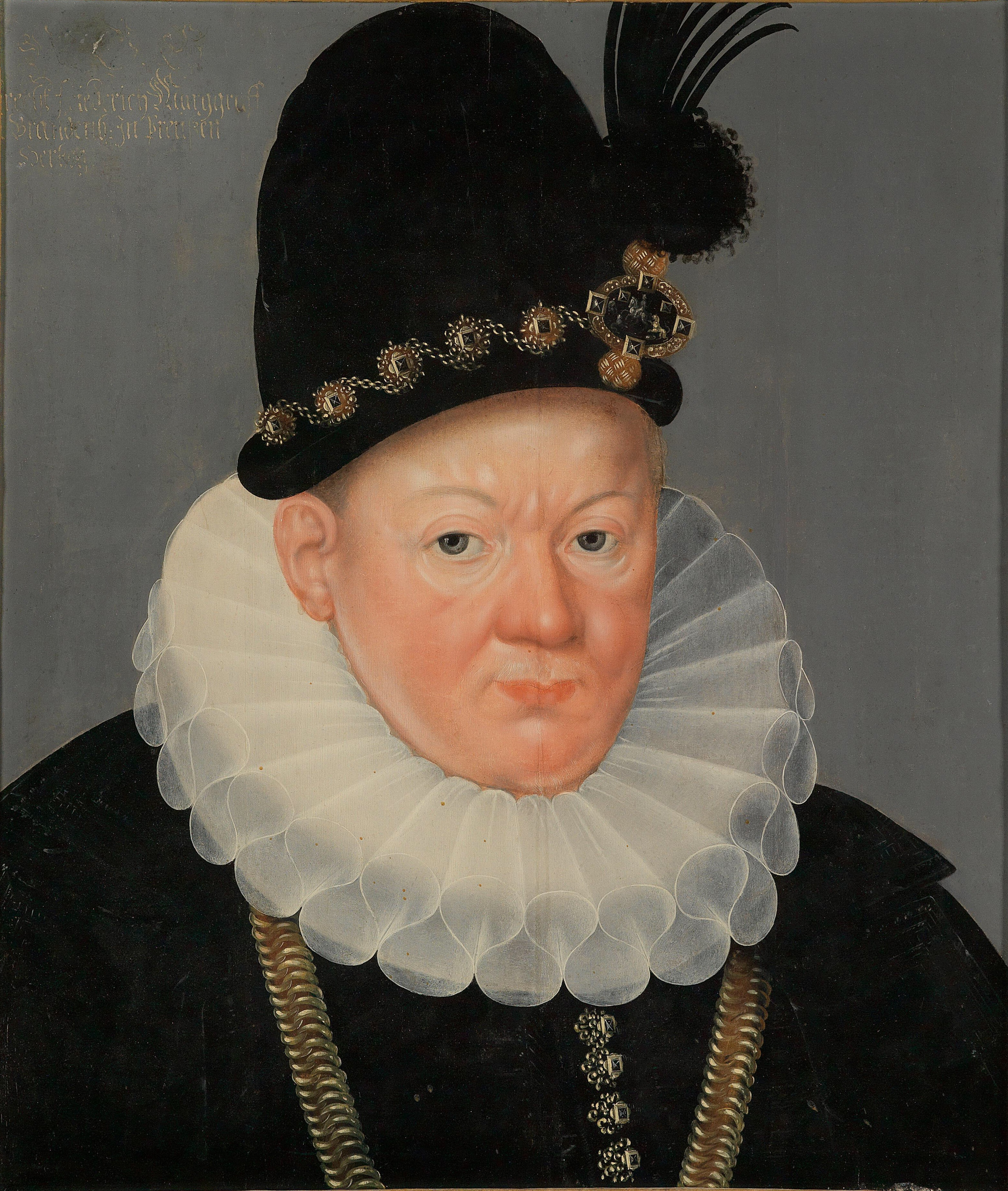
Albert Frederick, Duke of Prussia (before 1618)

Heinrich Bollandt (1577/78, Thuringia - 19 August 1653, Bayreuth) was a court painter to Christian, Margrave of Brandenburg-Bayreuth; one of the first artists of what would come to be known as the "Brandenburg Renaissance". Most of his works were portraits.

== Biography ==
His youth was spent in Thuringia and he most likely took his first art lessons from the court painter, Johann Spenlin of Weimar and Dresden. When Spenlin died in 1609, Bollandt married his widow and developed a partnership with an artist named Johann Jeremias Erhard, who worked with him on numerous paintings. Around 1615, he and Erhard moved to the Principality of Bayreuth together and, the following year, Erhard married one of Bollandt's step-daughters.

Here, he began the most productive period of his career as an official painter to the court of Margrave Christian. In fact, most of his surviving works date from this period. By 1623, he was receiving an annual salary of 230 Gulden. After 1619, his compensation for individual works is also largely on record.

His wife died in 1625, and was buried in Bayreuth.

Although the Thirty Years' War had begun in 1618, he was able to remain in Bayreuth until around 1635, when he fled to Lübeck, where he was granted a permit from the Painter's Guild to be a "Freimeister", with the condition that he paint only portraits. He remained there for ten years, living with an apprentice, Michael Conrad Hirt, who married Bollandt's daughter, Anna Maria, in 1638.

After the war ended, he returned to Bayreuth, where he died and was buried.

== Sources ==
- Rainer-Maria Kiel: Der Bayreuther Hofmaler Heinrich Bollandt 1578–1653. In: Archiv für Oberfranken Vol. 96, 2016. (Historischer Verein für Oberfranken) ISSN 0066-6335, Pgs. 131–164
- Werner Schade: Bolland als Nachbildner Cranachs. In: Cranach und die Kunst der Renaissance unter den Hohenzollern. Kirche, Hof und Stadtkultur (Ausstellungskatalog mit Bildern u. a. Heinrich Bollands). Deutscher Kunstverlag, Berlin 2009, Pgs. 81–85
