= Magdalena Sibylle of Prussia =

Electress of Saxony from 1611 to 1656

Duchess Magdalene Sibylle of Prussia
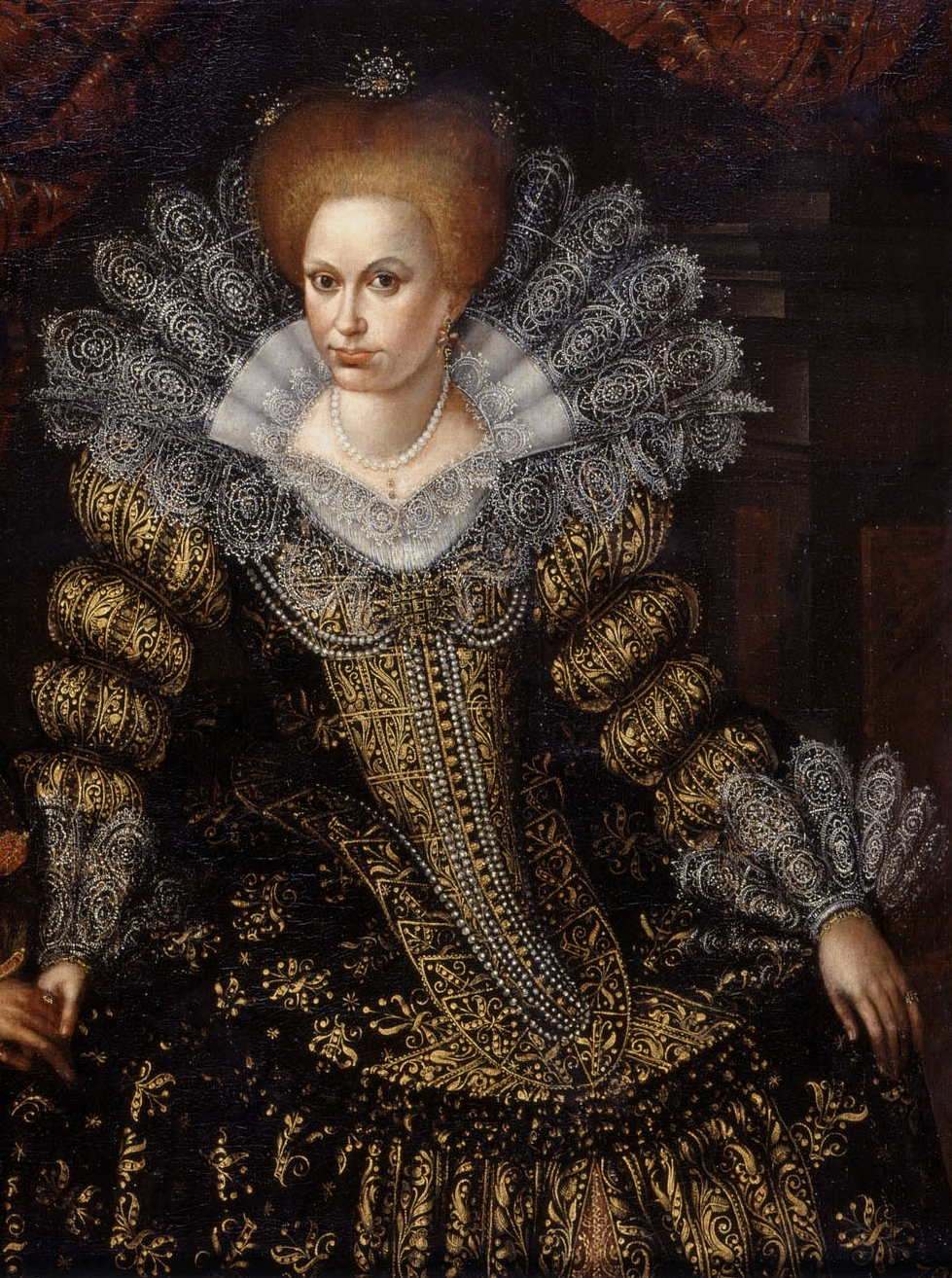
- Magdalena Sibylle in or after 1617

Electress consort of Saxony
- Tenure: 23 June 1611 - 8 October 1656
- Born: 31 December 1586; Königsberg
- Died: 12 February 1659 (aged 72); Dresden
- Spouse: John George I, Elector of Saxony (m. 1607; died 1656)
- Issue: Sophie Eleonore, Landgravine of Hesse-Darmstadt; Marie Elisabeth, Duchess of Holstein-Gottorp; John George II, Elector of Saxony; August, Duke of Saxe-Weissenfels; Christian I, Duke of Saxe-Merseburg; Magdalene Sibylle, Duchess of Saxe-Altenburg; Maurice, Duke of Saxe-Zeitz
- House: House of Hohenzollern
- Father: Albert Frederick, Duke of Prussia
- Mother: Marie Eleonore of Cleves

Magdalene Sibylle of Prussia (31 December 1586 – 12 February 1659) was an Electress of Saxony as the wife of John George I, Elector of Saxony.

== Life ==
Magdalene Sibylle was born in Königsberg, the daughter of Albert Frederick, Duke of Prussia and Marie Eleonore of Cleves. She married John George on 19 July 1607 in Torgau.

Magdalene Sibylle was a friend of the Swedish queen Maria Eleonora of Brandenburg, her niece, and was interested in painting, poetry and gardening. Magdalene Sibylle used Swedish prisoners of war to work on the Dresdner Festungsbau ("Dresden fortress").

As a widow in 1656, Magdalene Sibylle retired to the Dresdner Frau Kurfürstin-Haus and died in Dresden in 1659.

== Children ==
Magdalene Sibylle had ten children:

1. Stillborn son (Dresden, 18 July 1608)
2. Sophie Eleonore (Dresden, 23 November 1609 – Darmstadt, 2 June 1671), married on 1 April 1627 Landgrave Georg II of Hesse-Darmstadt
3. Marie Elisabeth (Dresden, 22 November 1610 – Husum, 24 October 1684), married on 21 February 1630 Duke Frederick III of Holstein-Gottorp
4. Christian Albert (Dresden, 4 March 1612 – Dresden, 9 August 1612)
5. Johann Georg II (Dresden, 31 May 1613 – Freiberg, 22 August 1680), successor of his father as Elector of Saxony
6. August (Dresden, 13 August 1614 – Halle, 4 August 1680), inherited Weissenfels as Duke.
7. Christian I (Dresden, 27 October 1615 – Merseburg, 18 October 1691), inherited Merseburg as Duke
8. Magdalene Sibylle (Dresden, 23 December 1617 – Schloss Altenburg, 6 January 1668), married firstly on 5 October 1634 to Crown Prince Christian, eldest son and heir of King Christian IV of Denmark; and secondly, on 11 October 1652, to Duke Frederick Wilhelm II of Saxe-Altenburg
9. Maurice (Dresden, 28 March 1619 – Moritzburg, 4 December 1681), inherited Zeitz as Duke
10. Heinrich (Dresden, 27 June 1622 – Dresden, 15 August 1622).

Magdalena Sibylle of Prussia House of Hohenzollern Born: 31 December 1586 Died: 12 February 1659
Royal titles
Preceded by Hedwig of Denmark	Electress consort of Saxony; 1611–1656	Succeeded by Magdalene Sybille of Brandenburg-Bayreuth
