= Dispositio Achillea =

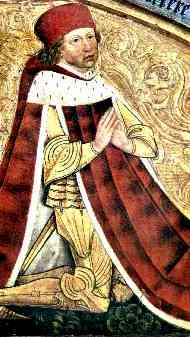
Albrecht Achilles von Brandenburg

The Dispositio Achillea (also: Constitutio Achillea or Achillean House Law) was the disposition of the territories of Elector Albert III Achilles of Brandenburg as regulated in his last will and testament of 1473.

In particular, the Achillea Dispositio stipulated that the Mark Brandenburg was to remain undivided and to be inherited in its entirety by the eldest son (at Albrecht Achilles death, that would be John Cicero). This was a requirement of the Golden Bull: electorates were required to be indivisible. Albrecht Achilles's younger sons, Frederick I and Siegmund would inherit the Franconian Margraviates of Brandenburg-Ansbach and Brandenburg-Kulmbach (later Brandenburg-Bayreuth), and draw lots to decide who would inherit which principality. If Albrecht Achilles were to have any more sons (which he did not), they would not inherit any land and should instead pursue an ecclesiastical career.

Strictly speaking, at the time the Dispositio Achillea was written, it only defined the division of the Margraviates among the sons of the Margrave of the day. Over time, however, it was accepted as a succession principle of the House of Hohenzollern and in 1541 the Dispositio Achillea and the House Treaty of Regensburg were accepted as a binding house law of the Hohenzollern dynasty.

The central element of Achillea Dispositio was the principle of the indivisibility of the Mark Brandenburg, which it made part of the Hohenzollern House law, and not—as previously—only a clause in the Golden Bull. At the same time, it provided the cornerstone for a development that eventually lead to progressive separation of the Mark Brandenburg from the Hohenzollern stem lands in Franconia. It created the two territories of Brandenburg-Ansbach and Brandenburg-Kulmbach, which were only reunited with the Mark's successor state of Prussia in 1791.

== References and sources ==
- Gerhard Taddey: Lexikon der deutschen Geschichte, Stuttgart, 1998, ISBN 3-520-81303-3
- M. Spindler, A. Kraus: Geschichte Frankens bis zum Ausgang des 18. Jahrhunderts, Munich, 1997, ISBN 3-406-39451-5
