= George Albert, Margrave of Brandenburg-Bayreuth =

German prince

Georg Albrecht of Brandenburg-Bayreuth
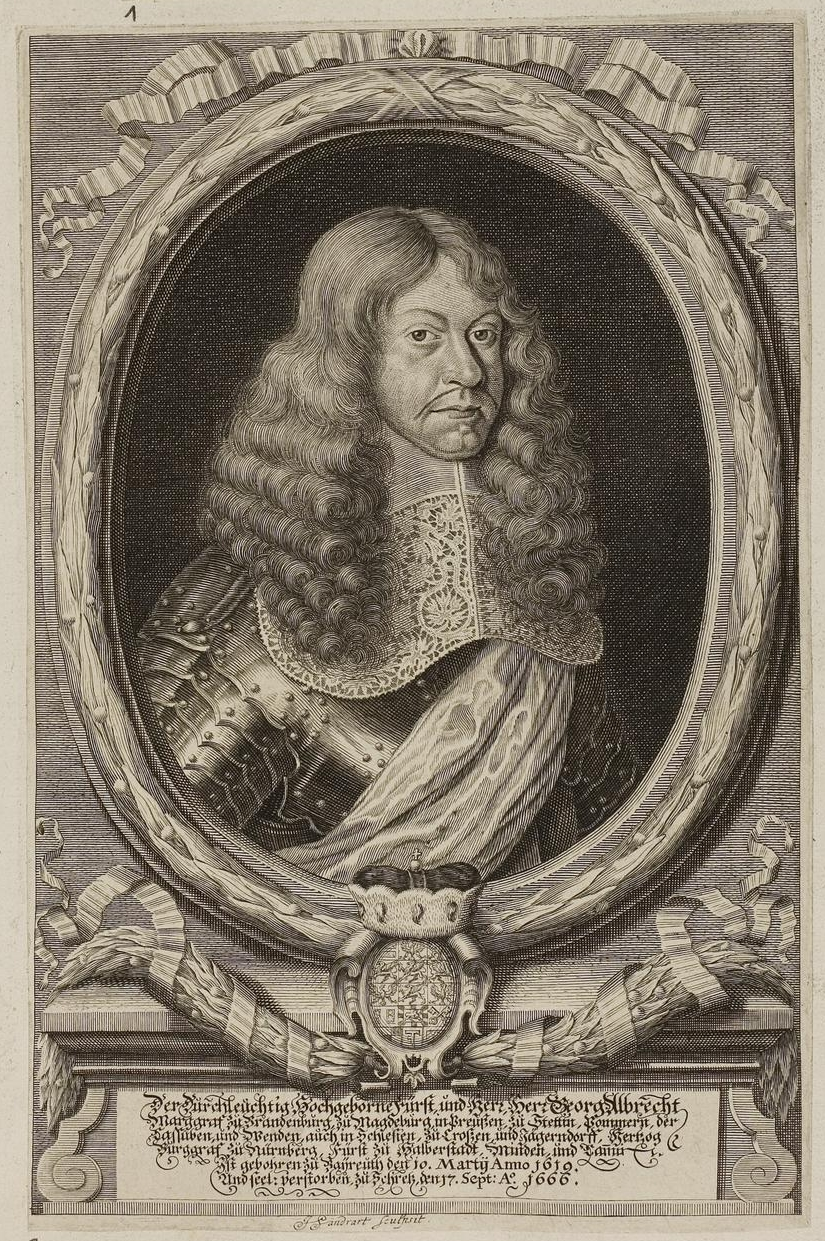
- Portrait by Jacob von Sandrart
- Born: 20 March 1619; Bayreuth
- Died: 27 September 1666 (aged 47); Schretz
- Spouse: Princess Maria Elisabeth of Schleswig-Holstein-Sonderburg-Glücksburg; Sophie Marie of Solms-Baruth-Wildenfels
- Issue Detail: Christian Heinrich, Margrave of Brandenburg-Bayreuth-Kulmbach
- House: House of Hohenzollern
- Father: Christian, Margrave of Brandenburg-Bayreuth
- Mother: Marie of Prussia

Georg Albrecht of Brandenburg-Bayreuth (Bayreuth, 20 March 1619 – Schretz, 27 September 1666), was a German prince and member of the House of Hohenzollern.

He was the eighth of the nine children of Christian, Margrave of Brandenburg-Bayreuth, by his wife, Marie of Prussia. He was last child of his parents who survived into adulthood; his younger brother Frederick William, born in 1620, lived only one day.

== Life ==
Georg Albrecht's older brother, Hereditary Margrave Erdmann August, died in 1651, four years before the death of their father. However, despite the fact he was the only surviving son of his father, he couldn't inherit Bayreuth, because the late prince left a son, Christian Ernst (born in 1644) who replaced him in the line of succession.

When Margrave Christian died in 1655, his grandson Christian Ernst succeeded him. But, because he was too young to reign, Georg Albrecht acted as regent for his nephew until 1664, when Christian Ernst assumed the full government of Bayreuth.

When his father died, Georg Albrecht received Kulmbach as appanage, but never ruled over this land. His title of Margrave of Brandenburg-Bayreuth-Kulmbach was only nominal.

== Succession of Bayreuth ==
When the only surviving son of his nephew Christian Ernst died without surviving male issue in 1726, Georg Albrecht's eldest grandson, Georg Frederick Karl inherited Bayreuth. But the son and successor of Georg Frederick Karl, Frederick, also died without male descendants in 1763, and the youngest Georg Albrecht's grandson, Frederick Christian, became the last Margrave of the Younger line of Brandenburg-Bayreuth.

== Marriages and children ==
In Bayreuth on 10 December 1651, Georg Albrecht married firstly Marie Elisabeth (1628–1664), daughter of Philip, Duke of Schleswig-Holstein-Sonderburg-Glücksburg. They had six children:

1. Christian Philip (b. Bayreuth, 29 May 1653 – d. Bayreuth, 8 August 1653) died in infancy.
2. Sophie Amalie (b. Bayreuth, 20 June 1655 – d. Bayreuth, 20 February 1656) died in infancy.
3. George Frederick (b. Bayreuth, 1 October 1657 – d. Bayreuth, 14 April 1658) died in infancy.
4. Erdmann Philip (b. Bayreuth, 11 May 1659 – d. after falling from his horse at Schlosshof, Bayreuth, 5 September 1678), died unmarried and without issue at 19.
5. Christian Heinrich (b. Bayreuth, 29 July 1661 – d. Weferlingen, 5 April 1708).
6. Charles August (b. Kulmbach, 28 March 1663 – d. Neustadt am Aisch, 26 March 1731) died unmarried and without issue.

In Colditz on 11 November 1665 (17 months after the death of his first wife), Georg Albrecht married secondly Sophie Marie of Solms-Baruth-Wildenfels, Dowager Countess of Schönburg-Lichtenstein. They had one son:

1. George Albert (b. posthumously, Plassenburg, 7 December 1666 – d. Oberkotzau, 24 January 1703), acquired Oberkotzau by purchase in 1698. He married in Alt-Kinsberg on 7 May 1699 to Regina Magdalena Lutz (b. Bayreuth, 22.4.1678 – d. Oberkotzau, 27.10.1755), daughter of an administrator in Oberkotzau. This marriage was morganatic and the issue born of them was barren of the succession of Bayreuth. Regina was created Frau von Kotzau in 1701. Their descendants, the Freiherren von Kotzau, were extinct in the male line in 1976.
