= John George II of Saxony =

Elector of Saxony from 1656 to 1680

Johann George II
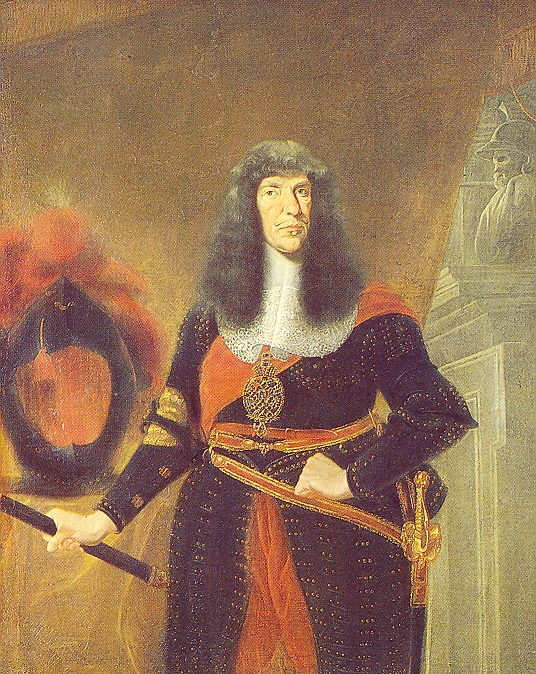
- Portrait, c. 1648–1675

Elector of Saxony
- Reign: 8 October 1656 - 22 August 1680
- Predecessor: John George I
- Successor: John George III
- Born: 31 May 1613; Dresden, Electorate of Saxony, Holy Roman Empire
- Died: 22 August 1680 (aged 67); Tübingen, Duchy of Württemberg, Holy Roman Empire
- Burial: Cathedral of Freiberg
- Spouse: Magdalene Sybille of Brandenburg-Bayreuth
- Issue: Erdmuthe Sophie of Saxony; John George III, Elector of Saxony
- House: Wettin (Albertine line)
- Father: John George I, Elector of Saxony
- Mother: Magdalene Sybille of Prussia
- Religion: Lutheran
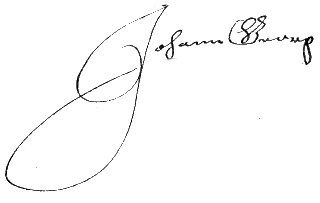
- Signature

Johann George II (31 May 1613 – 22 August 1680) was the Elector of Saxony from 1656 to 1680. He belonged to the Albertine branch of the House of Wettin.

== Biography ==
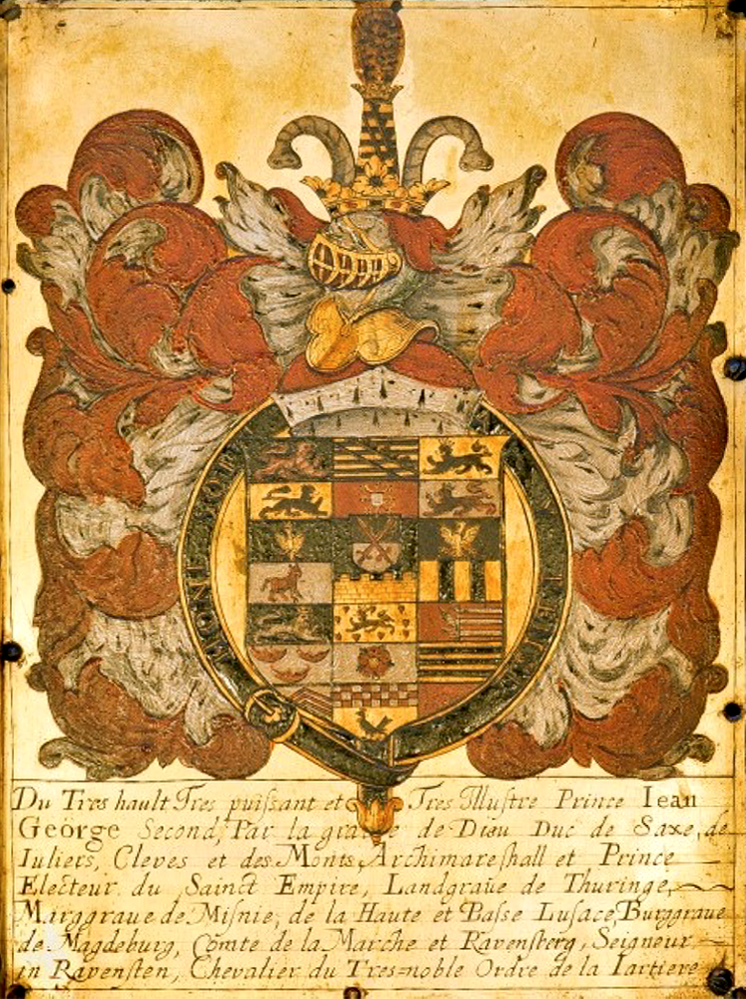
17th-century Order of the Garter stall plate for John George II, Elector of Saxony. Located in St. George's Chapel, Windsor Castle, Berkshire, England

He was the third but eldest surviving son of John George I, Elector of Saxony and Magdalene Sibylle of Prussia, his second spouse. He succeeded his father as Elector of Saxony when John George I died on 8 October 1656.

In 1657 John George made an arrangement with his three brothers with the object of preventing disputes over their separate territories, and in 1664 he entered into friendly relations with Louis XIV. He received money from the French king, but the existence of a strong anti-French party in Saxony induced him occasionally to respond to the overtures of the Emperor Leopold I.

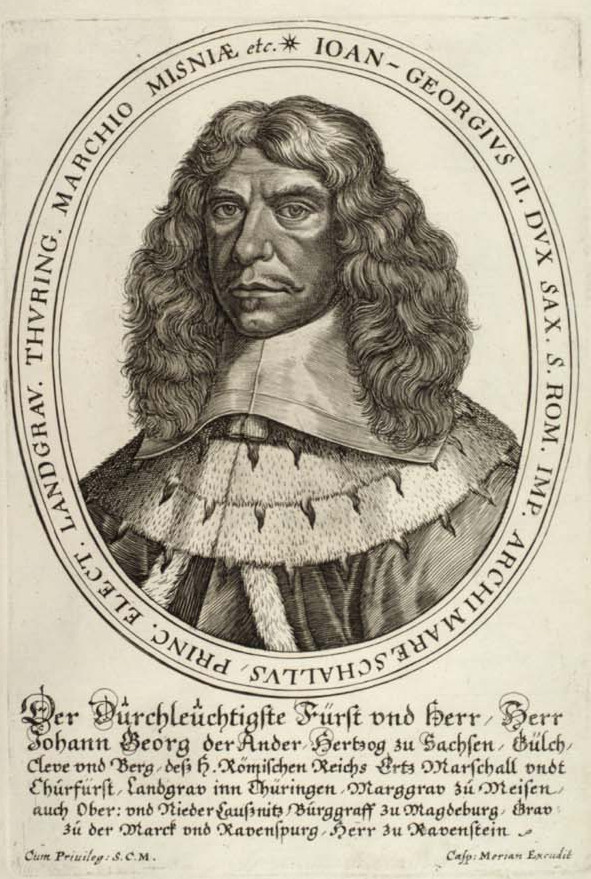
John George II, picture from 1658

The elector's primary interests were not in politics, but in music and art. He adorned Dresden, which under him became the musical centre of Germany; welcoming foreign musicians and others he gathered around him a large and splendid court, and his capital was the constant scene of musical and other festivals. He commissioned the building of the first opera house, the Opernhaus am Taschenberg.

In 1658 John George was accepted into the Fruitbearing Society, through the patronage of Duke William of Saxe-Weimar.

His enormous expenditure on the arts compelled John George in 1661 to grant greater control over monetary matters to the estates, a step which laid the foundation of the later system of finance in Saxony. Also, his government was less effective in establishing absolutist rule and a standing army than were Bohemia or Prussia.

John George's reign saw the slow economic reconstruction of Saxony after the Thirty Years' War. New trades and manufactures developed, such as textiles, hard coal and glass. Locally mined silver filled the electorate's empty treasury, and the Leipzig Trade Fair and the Bohemian Exulanten of 1654 also stimulated economic activity.

John George died in Freiberg on 22 August 1680.

== Family ==
In Dresden on 13 November 1638 John George married his cousin Magdalene Sibylle of Brandenburg-Bayreuth. They had at least two children;

1. Erdmuthe Sophie (25 February 1644 – 22 June 1670), married on 29 October 1662 to Christian Ernst, Margrave of Brandenburg-Bayreuth
2. John George III (20 June 1647 – 12 September 1691), his successor as Elector.

A third child, Sibylle Marie, is believed to have died in childhood.

== See also ==
- List of famous big game hunters

== Sources ==
- Frandsen, Mary E. Crossing Confessional Boundaries. The Patronage of Italian Sacred Music in 17th Century Dresden. New York: Oxford University Press, 2006. ISBN 0-19-517831-9
- Groß, Reiner (2007). Die Wettiner. Stuttgart: Kohlhammer Verlag.
- Wilson, Peter H. (2016). Heart of Europe: A History of the Holy Roman Empire. Cambridge: Harvard University Press.

John George II of Saxony House of Wettin Born: 31 May 1613 Died: 22 August 1680
Regnal titles
Preceded by John George I	Elector of Saxony; 1656–1680	Succeeded by John George III
