= Marie Eleonore of Cleves =

Duchess Marie Eleonore
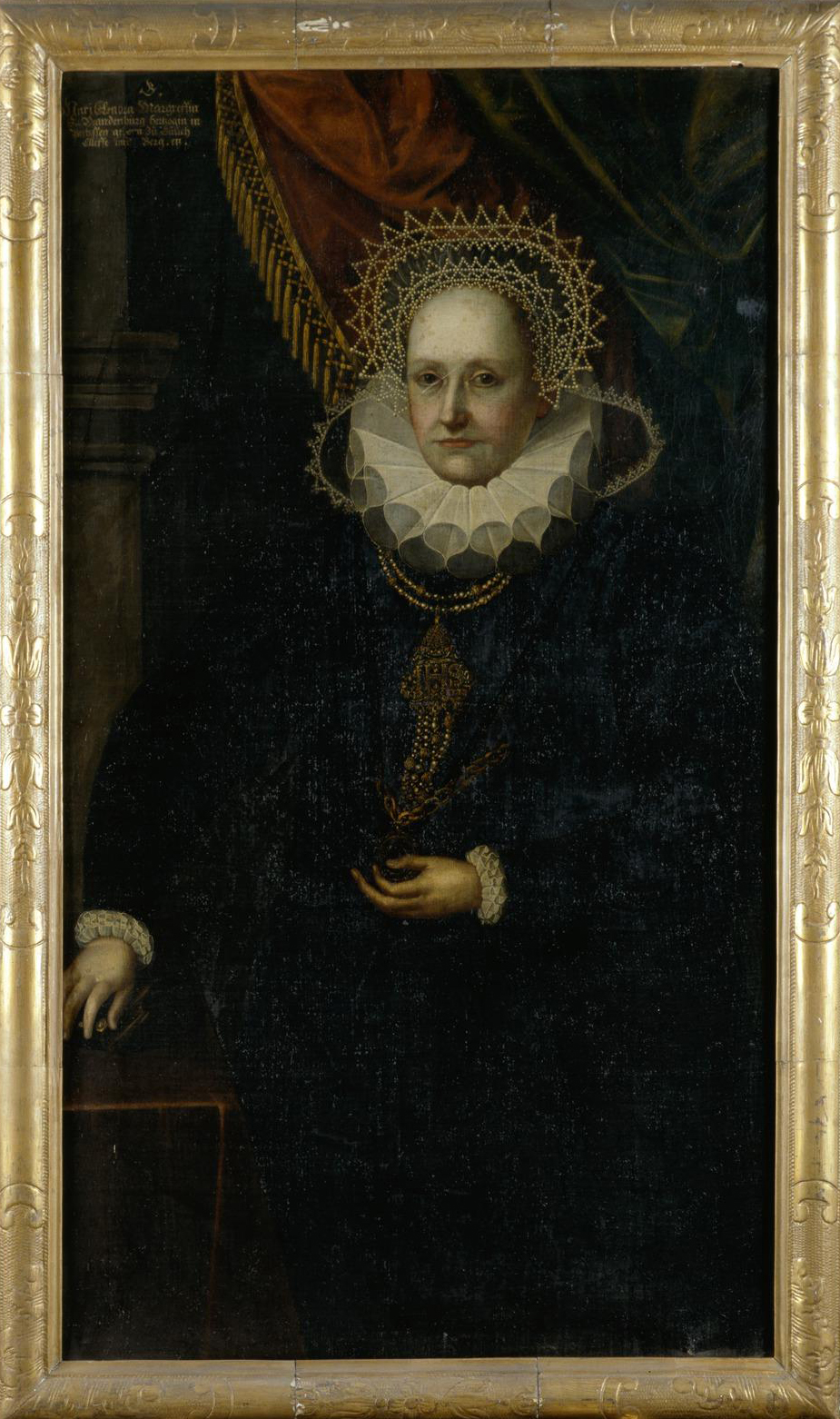

Duchess consort of Prussia
- Tenure: 14 October 1573 - 1 June 1608
- Born: 16 June 1550; Cleves
- Died: 1 June 1608 (aged 57); Königsberg
- Spouse: Albert Frederick, Duke of Prussia (m. 1573)
- Issue: Anna, Duchess of Prussia, Electress of Brandenburg; Marie, Margravine of Brandenburg-Bayreuth; Prince Albert Frederick; Sophie, Duchess of Courland and Semigallia; Eleonore, Electress of Brandenburg; Prince Wilhelm Frederick; Magdalene Sibylle, Electress of Saxony
- House: La Marck
- Father: William, Duke of Jülich-Cleves-Berg
- Mother: Archduchess Maria of Austria

Duchess Marie Eleonore of Cleves (16 June 1550 – 1 June 1608) was the Duchess of Prussia by marriage to Albert Frederick, Duke of Prussia. She was the eldest child of William, Duke of Jülich-Cleves-Berg and Maria of Austria.

== Life ==
She was the maternal granddaughter of Ferdinand I, Holy Roman Emperor and Anna of Bohemia and Hungary, and sister of John William, Duke of Jülich-Cleves-Berg. Her paternal aunt Anne of Cleves was, for six months, the fourth wife of King Henry VIII of England.

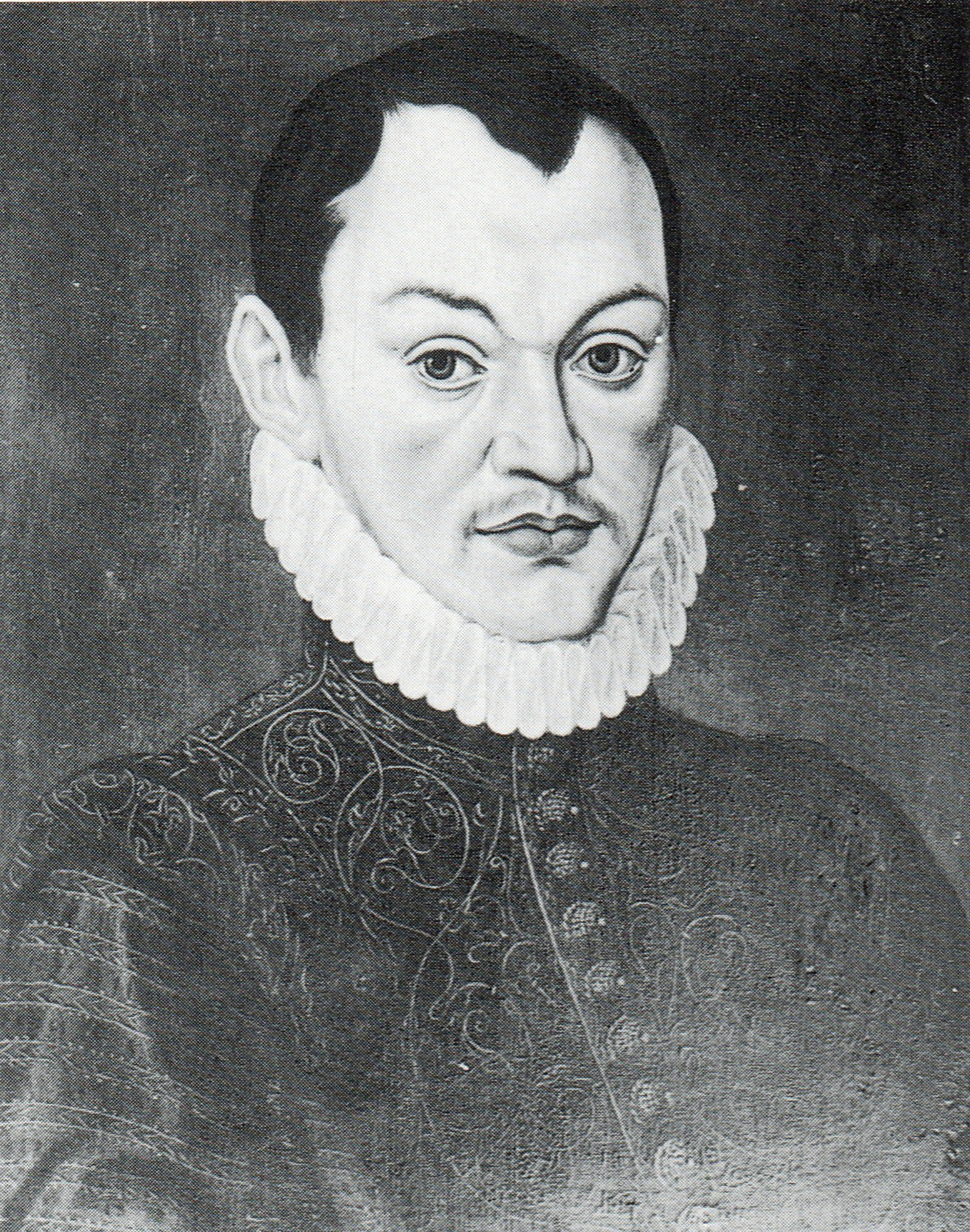
Albert Frederick

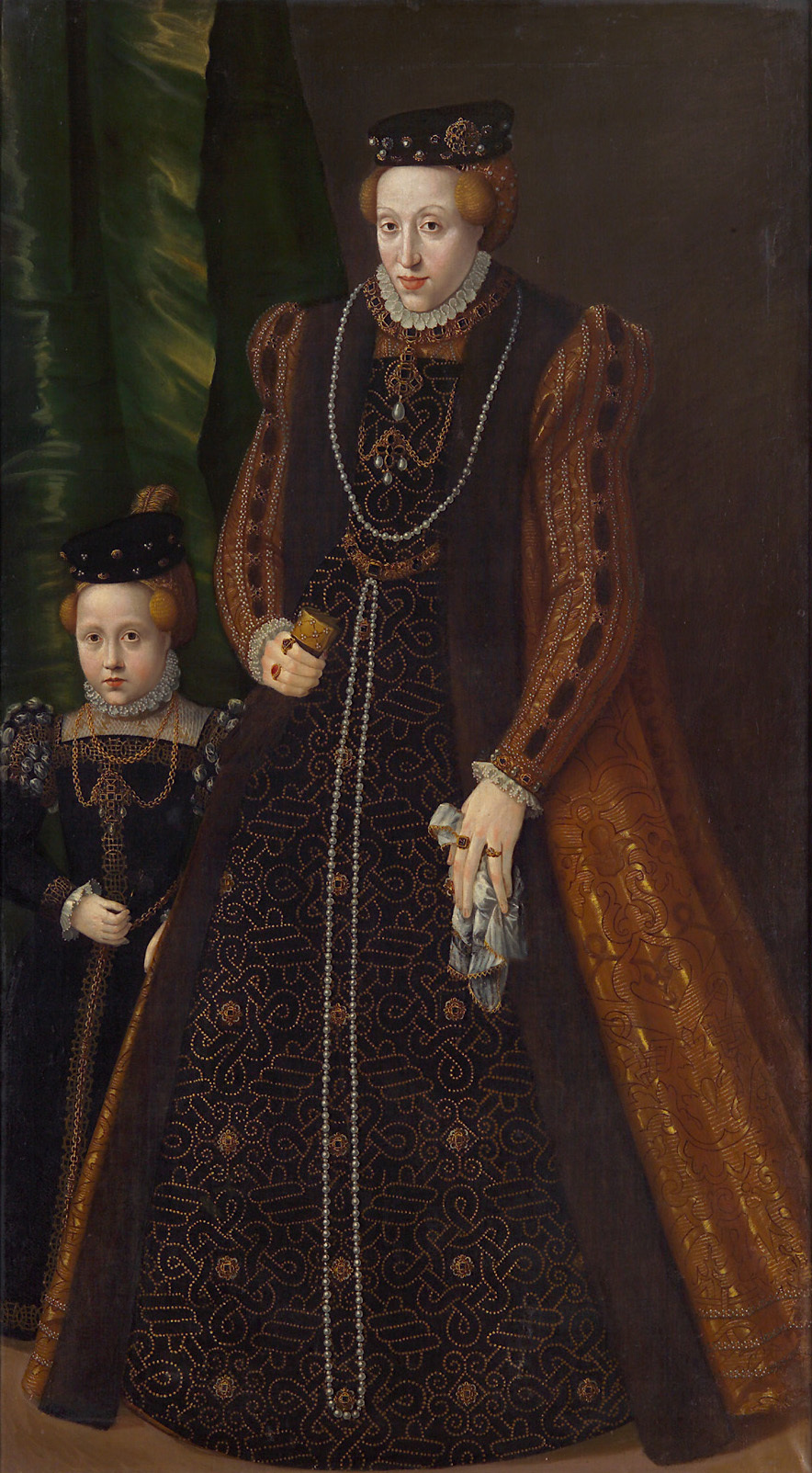
Marie and her mother

Marie Eleonore was educated in the languages French and Latin.

While her father was a Roman Catholic, Marie Eleonore displayed firm Lutheran sympathies early on in which she were supported by her paternal aunt Amalia who had also helped raising her and her sisters. Marie Eleonores father was afraid that she would influence her younger sisters with her religious views, and therefore wished to have her married to someone of her own religious convictions as soon as possible in order to remove her from his domains, and thus considered grooms for his daughter that he would not otherwise have considered. Albert Frederick, Duke of Prussia, the son of Albert of Prussia, was thus accepted as a suitor, despite showing mental disorders. The wedding was conducted in 1573, and Marie Eleonore departed to Lutheran Prussia.

Her new husband who had displayed sign of mental illness since 1572, had twice tried to commit suicide and was prone to violent outbursts and also held great fear of " Turks and Muscovites " overrunning Germany.

In 1577, her mentally ill spouse was placed under the regency of his cousin George Frederick, Margrave of Brandenburg-Ansbach, which made the position of Marie Eleonore more difficult at the Ducal court of Königsberg. In 1591, she returned with her daughters to Jülich, where she remained until 1592. She arranged the marriage of her daughters to German princes to avoid them being married by the Regency Council to Polish suitors, and by the marriage alliances she arranged, she ensured that the Duchy of Jülich would pass to Brandenburg after the death of her brother.

== Issue ==
- Anna of Prussia (3 July 1576 – 30 August 1625); married John Sigismund, Elector of Brandenburg.
- Duchess Marie of Prussia (23 January 1579 – 21 February 1649); married Christian, Margrave of Brandenburg-Bayreuth.
- Duke Albert Frederick of Prussia (1 June 1580 – 8 October 1580).
- Duchess Sofie of Prussia (31 March 1582 – 4 December 1610); married Wilhelm Kettler of Courland.
- Duchess Eleonore of Prussia (22 August 1583 – 31 March/9 April 1607); married Joachim Frederick, Elector of Brandenburg.
- Duke Wilhelm Frederick of Prussia (23 June 1585 – 18 January 1586).
- Duchess Magdalene Sibylle of Prussia (31 December 1586 – 22 February 1659); married John George I, Elector of Saxony.

== Ancestors ==
Ancestors of Marie Eleonore of Cleves

8. John II, Duke of Cleves
4. John III, Duke of Cleves
9. Matilda of Hesse
2. William, Duke of Jülich-Cleves-Berg
10. William IV, Duke of Jülich-Berg
5. Maria, Duchess of Jülich-Berg
11. Sibylle of Brandenburg
1. Marie Eleonore of Cleves
12. Philip I, King of Castile
6. Ferdinand I, Holy Roman Emperor
13. Joanna, Queen of Castile
3. Archduchess Maria of Austria
14. Vladislaus II of Hungary
7. Anne of Bohemia and Hungary
15. Anne of Foix-Candale

Marie Eleonore of Cleves House of La Marck Born: 16 June 1550 Died: 1 June 1608
Vacant Title last held by Anna Maria of Brunswick-Lüneburg	Duchess consort of Prussia; 1573–1608	Succeeded by Duchess Anna of Prussia
