= Mecklenburg-Schwerin =

Mecklenburg-Schwerin may refer to:

- Duchy of Mecklenburg-Schwerin (1701–1815), a duchy of the Holy Roman Empire and the Confederation of the Rhine
- Grand Duchy of Mecklenburg-Schwerin (1815–1918), a Grand Duchy of the German Confederation and the North German Confederation that later became part of the German Empire
- Free State of Mecklenburg-Schwerin (1918–1933), part of the Weimar Republic

== See also ==
- Mecklenburg, historical region in northern Germany
- Schwerin, second-largest city in the Mecklenburg region
