= House law =

Rules governing a royal family

House laws (German: Hausgesetze) are rules that govern a royal family or dynasty in matters of eligibility for succession to a throne, membership in a dynasty, exercise of a regency, or entitlement to dynastic rank, titles and styles. Prevalent in European monarchies during the nineteenth century, few countries have house laws any longer, so that they are, as a category of law, of more historical than current significance. If applied today, house laws are mostly upheld by members of royal and princely families as a matter of tradition.

Some dynasties have codified house laws, which then form a distinct section of the laws of the realm, e.g., Monaco, Japan, Liechtenstein and, formerly, most of Germany's principalities, as well as Austria and Russia. Other monarchies had few laws regulating royal life. In still others, whatever laws existed were not gathered in any particular section of the nation's laws. In Germany, where many dynasties reigned as more or less independent sovereigns, laws governing dynastic rights constituted a distinct branch of jurisprudence called private princely law (Privatfürstenrecht).

The house laws of the German ruling families had a direct influence on Scandinavian kingdoms including Denmark and Sweden.

== Dynastic traditions ==
In some cases, house laws are rules or traditions that are treated as if they have the force of law. In the United Kingdom an example of this might be considered the custom whereby a wife shares in her husband's hereditary titles and rank. While this is settled common law with respect to the wives of peers and commoners, it is less clear when it comes to consorts of the king and princes. When, in 1923, Prince Albert, Duke of York became the first male member of the British royal family to marry a non-princess in more than 300 years (with the sovereign's approval), an announcement was apparently issued by Buckingham Palace and carried in the London Gazette and The Times, "It is officially announced that, in accordance with the settled general rule that a wife takes the status of her husband, Lady Elizabeth Bowes-Lyon on her marriage has become Her Royal Highness the Duchess of York, with the status of a Princess".

This issue was revisited by the British government in both 1937 and 2005, when the marriages of former and future kings to divorcées cast into doubt what titulature was appropriate for women who were to become, essentially, the private wives of royal princes. As can be gleaned from discussions at the time, popular certainty that "a woman is entitled to share her husband's status", has by no means been seen as absolutely clear by government experts and lawyers upon examining the matter.

In the case of the marriage of Prince Charles to Camilla Parker Bowles, in 2005, the matter was settled by the decision that Camilla, whilst legally the Princess of Wales, would only use her secondary title of Duchess of Cornwall, out of respect to public sensibilities and to her predecessor, Diana, Princess of Wales.

== Extraordinary law ==
Where they have existed, dynastic house laws have often been extraordinary compared to other national laws. The house laws of the families of the Austrian and German emperors were not made public until after the fall of the monarchy in 1918. Luxembourg's grand duke has made modifications to his country's dynastic law that remain unknown to the public at present. Russia's house laws were applied—or not—at the tsar's discretion. Even today, the house laws of the dynasty that has exclusive right to succeed to the throne of Liechtenstein may not be amended by either the parliament or populace of the principality, and until the late 1990s the reigning Prince could not be dethroned except according to the house law—which stipulated that ouster was only possible by a vote of his own family members. Such house laws and the dynastic rules which deny parliaments or other democratic bodies any role in determining them, are obviously problematic for constitutional monarchies like those now found in many modern European nations.

== Royal marriages ==
Nearly all house laws have regulated dynasts' right to marry. Paul I of Russia established the house law of the Romanovs (the Pauline Laws), one of the strictest in Europe: the consorts of Russian dynasts had to be "equally born" (i.e., belong to a royal or ruling house) and be approved by the tsar.

While some German dynasties included in their laws language requiring or urging the monarch to consent to any "equal" marriage, some heads of dynastic houses rejected royal matches on behalf of their family members. The French pretender denied his daughter, Princess Hélène d'Orléans, the opportunity to become Queen Consort of Britain by refusing to grant her permission to convert to Anglicanism to marry Prince Albert Victor, Duke of Clarence.

In the late 19th or early 20th centuries the monarchs of Belgium, Russia, and Spain all withheld consent from members of their families to marry for love into foreign dynasties. Grand Duke Cyril Vladimirovich of Russia and Infante Alfonso de Borbon-Orléans of Spain sought to marry a pair of sisters who were also British princesses (respectively, Princess Victoria Melita of Edinburgh and Princess Beatrice of Edinburgh). In both cases, the husband-to-be chose to elope and endure (temporary) banishment rather than obey his sovereign's command.

== Evolution of dynastic law ==
European dynasties dethroned at the end of World War I continue to enforce their house laws even though they had no legal authority to do so. Some continued doing so through the 20th century (Bourbon-Sicily, Braganza, Prussia, Württemberg). Governments in extant monarchies, without calling the legal mechanisms house laws, have generally strengthened their control over the marriages of members of their royal families since the second half of the 20th century. Previously a prince could often morganatically marry a woman not deemed acceptable as a royal consort, relegating her and their children to a sub-royal status. That is rarely an option anymore. In most Western European monarchies of today, a prince must renounce or forfeit membership in the royal house if his chosen spouse is not deemed suitable, e.g., Prince Friso of Orange-Nassau.

== See also ==
- Salic law
- Imperial Household Law
- Hereditary monarchy
