= Albert Frederick, Duke of Prussia =

Duke of Prussia from 1568 to 1618

Albert Frederick
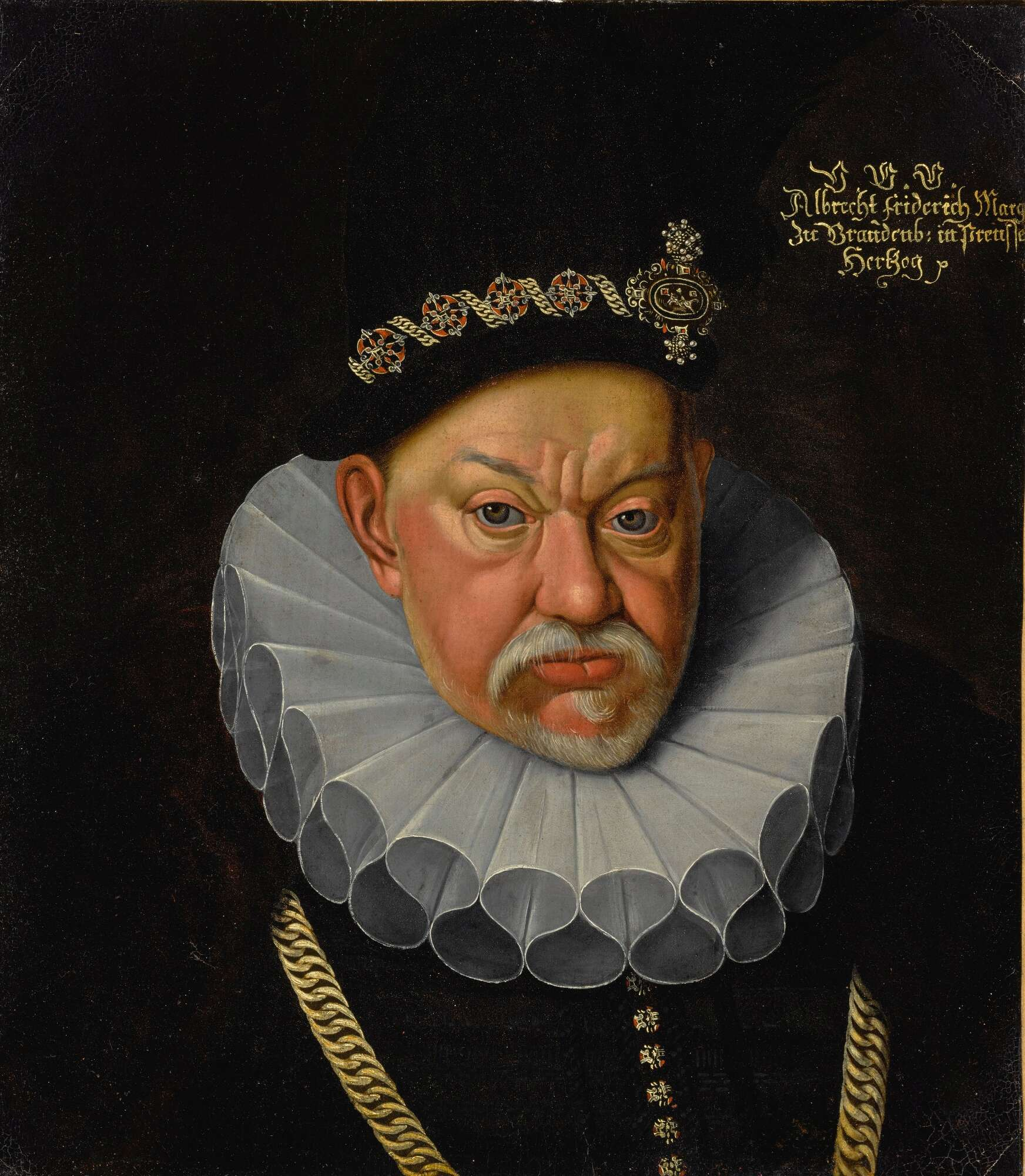

Duke of Prussia
- Reign: 20 March 1568 – 27 August 1618
- Predecessor: Albert
- Successor: John Sigismund
- Born: 7 May 1553; Königsberg, Duchy of Prussia
- Died: 27 August 1618 (aged 65); Fischhausen
- Spouse: Marie Eleonore of Cleves (m. 1573; died 1608)
- Issue: Anna, Duchess of Prussia, Electress of Brandenburg; Marie, Margravine of Brandenburg-Bayreuth; Prince Albert Frederick; Sophie, Duchess of Courland and Semigallia; Eleonore, Electress of Brandenburg; Prince Wilhelm Frederick; Magdalene Sibylle, Electress of Saxony
- House: Hohenzollern
- Father: Albert of Prussia
- Mother: Anna Marie of Brunswick-Lüneburg

Albert Frederick (German: Albrecht Friedrich; Polish: Albrecht Fryderyk; 7 May 1553 – 27 August 1618) was the Duke of Prussia, from 1568 until his death. He was the son of Albert of Prussia and Anna Marie of Brunswick-Lüneburg. He was the second and last Prussian duke of the Ansbach branch of the Hohenzollern family.

== Duke of Prussia ==
Albert Frederick became Duke of Prussia after paying feudal homage to his cousin, the King of Poland, Sigismund Augustus, on 19 July 1569 in Lublin. The homage was described by the Polish chronicler Jan Kochanowski in his work Proporzec ("Standard"). During the 1573 Polish election, Albert Frederick attempted to gain acceptance to the Polish senate but was opposed by the powerful Jan Zamoyski (later Grand Hetman of the Crown of the Kingdom of Poland) who feared the influence of Protestants in the Polish legislative body. Albert Frederick initially refused to recognize the election of Stefan Bathory and supported the candidacy of Maximilian of Austria. However, at the Toruń sejm of October 1576 he gave his support to the new monarch.

As the great-grandson of the Polish king Casimir IV Jagiellon, and as a Duke in Prussia who was fluent in Polish, Albert Frederick was seriously considered for a time as a possible candidate for the Polish throne. He particularly enjoyed the support of Polish Lutherans.

In 1572 he began to exhibit signs of mental disorder. He had twice tried to commit suicide and was prone to violent outbursts and held a great fear of " Turks and Muscovites " overrunning Germany.

In early 1578, the regency was taken over by his cousin, George Frederick of Brandenburg-Kulmbach (1539–1603). After George Frederick's death in 1603, the Polish king Sigismund III Vasa appointed Joachim Frederick as regent in 1605, and permitted his son, John Sigismund, to succeed him in 1611. The latter became Duke of Prussia after Albert Frederick's death in 1618.

== Marriage ==
Albert Frederick was married in 1573 to Marie Eleonore of Cleves, a daughter of Wilhelm, Duke of Jülich-Cleves-Berg and Archduchess Maria of Austria (1531–1581). Maria was a daughter of Ferdinand I, Holy Roman Emperor and Anna of Bohemia and Hungary.

== Issue ==
Albert Frederick and Marie were parents to seven children:

1. Anna of Prussia (3 July 1576 – 30 August 1625). Married John Sigismund, Elector of Brandenburg.
2. Marie of Prussia (23 January 1579 – 21 February 1649). Married Christian, Margrave of Brandenburg-Bayreuth.
3. Albert Frederick of Prussia (1 June 1580 – 8 October 1580) died in infancy.
4. Sophie of Prussia (31 March 1582 – 4 December 1610). Married Wilhelm Kettler of Courland.
5. Eleanor of Prussia (21 August 1583 – 9 April 1607). Married Joachim Frederick, Elector of Brandenburg.
6. Wilhelm Frederick of Prussia (23 June 1585 – 18 January 1586) died in infancy.
7. Magdalene Sibylle of Prussia (31 December 1586 – 22 February 1659). Married John George I, Elector of Saxony.

At his death, the duchy passed to his son-in-law John Sigismund, Margrave of Brandenburg, combining the two territories under a single dynasty and forming Brandenburg-Prussia.

== Ancestors ==
Ancestors of Albert Frederick, Duke of Prussia

8. Albrecht III Achilles, Elector of Brandenburg (1414-1486)
4. Frederick I, Margrave of Brandenburg-Ansbach (1460-1536)
9. Anna of Saxony (1437-1512)
2. Albert, Duke of Prussia (1490-1568)
10. Casimir IV Jagiellon (1427-1492)
5. Sophia of Poland (1464-1512)
11. Elisabeth of Austria (1436–1505)
1. Albert Frederick, Duke of Prussia
12. William IV, Duke of Brunswick-Lüneburg (1425-1503)
6. Eric I, Duke of Brunswick-Lüneburg (1470-1540)
13. Elizabeth of Stolberg-Wernigerode (1438-1520)
3. Anna Marie of Brunswick-Lüneburg (1532-1568)
14. Joachim I Nestor, Elector of Brandenburg (1484-1535)
7. Elisabeth of Brandenburg (1510-1558)
15. Elizabeth of Denmark (1485-1555)

Albert Frederick, Duke of Prussia House of Hohenzollern Born: 7 May 1553 Died: 27 August 1618
Regnal titles
Preceded by Albert	Duke of Prussia; 1568–1618	Succeeded by John Sigismund
