= Principality of Bayreuth =

Immediate territory of the Holy Roman Empire

Principality of Bayreuth/ Margraviate of Brandenburg-Kulmbach Fürstentum Bayreuth/Markgraftum Brandenburg-Kulmbach (German)
- 1398–1791
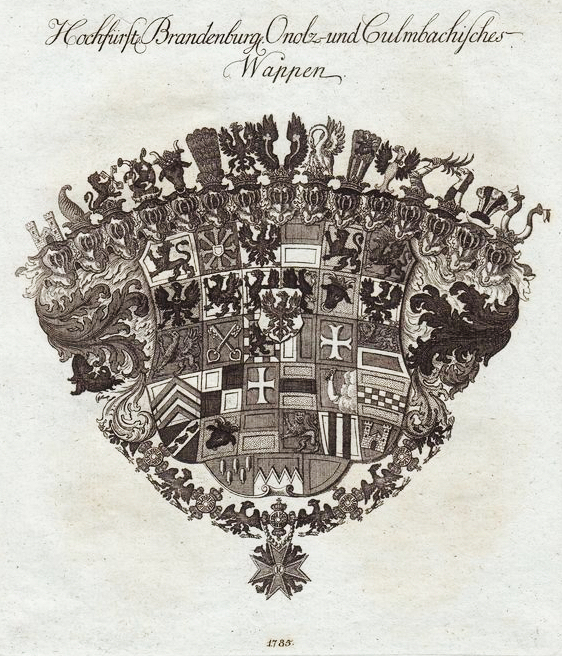
- Coat of arms

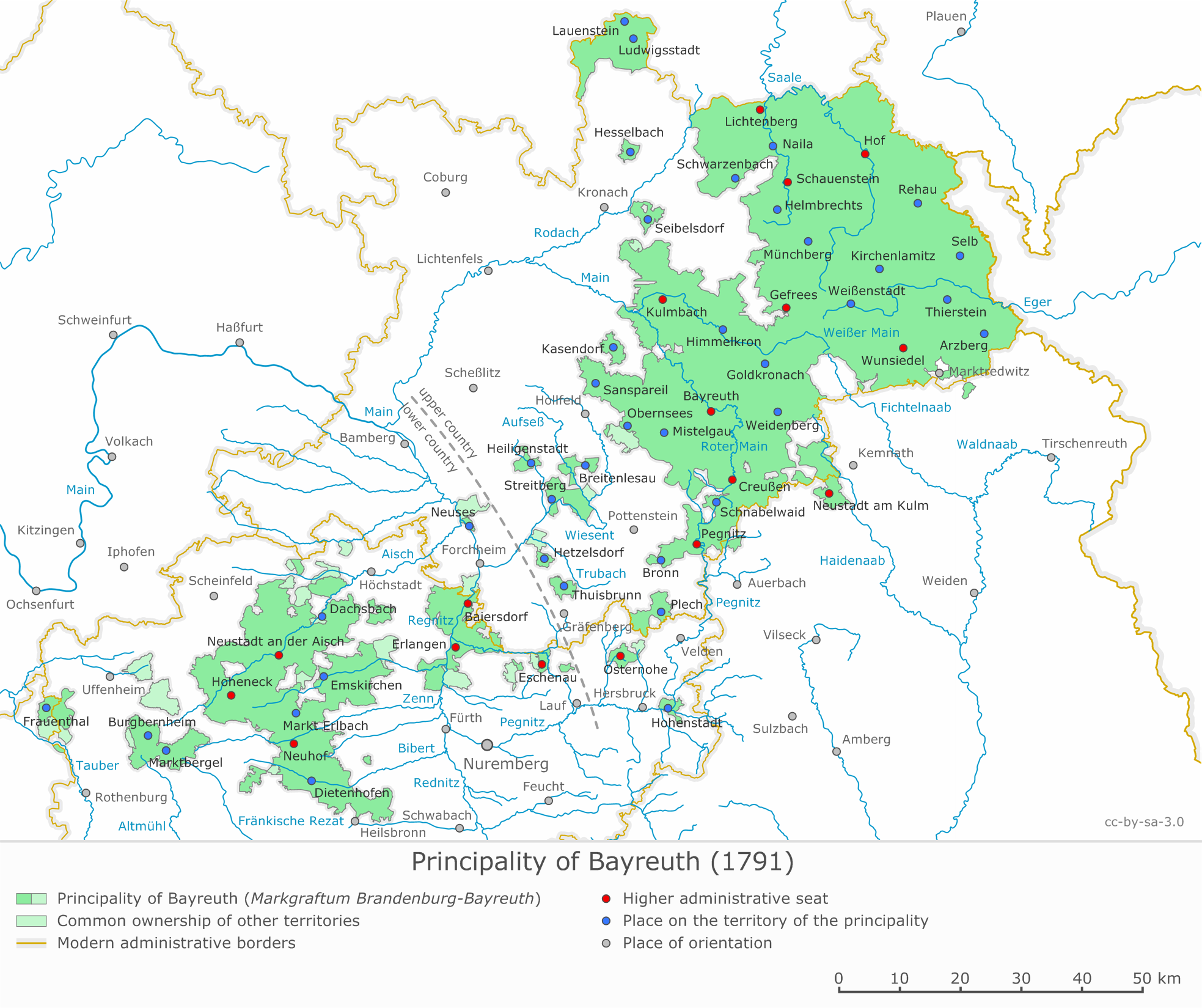
- Principality of Brandenburg-Bayreuth as at 1791, when it was sold to Prussia
- Status: Principality
- Capital: Kulmbach until 1604, Bayreuth from 1604
- Margrave
  - 1398–1420 (first): John III, Burgrave of Nuremberg
  - 1769–91 (last): Christian Frederick, Margrave of Brandenburg-Ansbach
- Historical era: Middle Ages
  - Partitioned from Burgraviate of Nuremberg: 21 January 1398
  - Reunited with Ansbach: 1420–40
  - Joined Franconian Circle: 1500
  - Partitioned in twain: 1655–1726
  - Line extinct; inherited by Ansbach: 20 January 1769
  - Ansbach and Bayreuth sold to Prussia: 2 December 1791
Preceded by	Succeeded by
Burgraviate of Nuremberg	Kingdom of Prussia

The Principality of Bayreuth (German: Fürstentum Bayreuth) or Margraviate of Brandenburg-Bayreuth (Markgraftum Brandenburg-Bayreuth) was an immediate territory of the Holy Roman Empire, ruled by a Franconian branch of the Hohenzollern dynasty. Since Burgrave Frederick VI of Nuremberg was enfeoffed with the Margraviate of Brandenburg in 1415/17, the Hohenzollern princes transferred the margravial title to their Franconian possessions, though the principality never had been a march. Until 1604 they used Plassenburg Castle in Kulmbach as their residence, hence their territory was officially called the Principality of Kulmbach or Margraviate of Brandenburg-Kulmbach until the Empire's dissolution in 1806.

== Geography ==
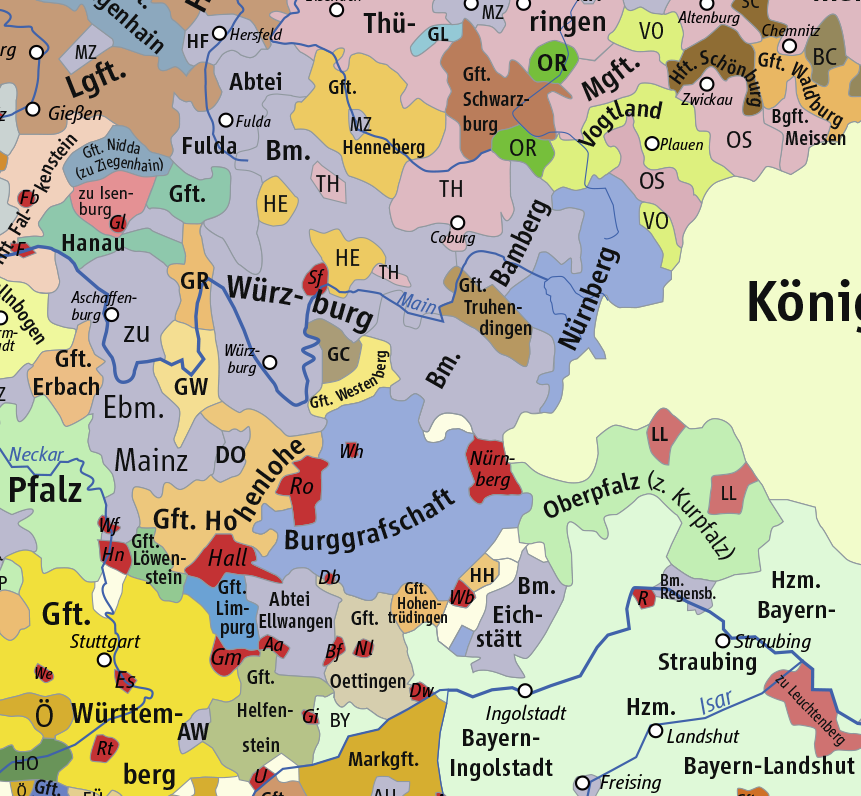
East Franconian territories around 1400, Burgraviate of Nuremberg in blue

The Kulmbach-Bayreuth principality arose from the northern uplands (Oberland) of the former Burgraviate of Nuremberg, while the southern lowlands (Unterland) formed the Principality of Ansbach. The final border demarcation was settled by the 1541 House Treaty of Regensburg, adding some smaller Unterland territories to Bayreuth. However, it was not connected with the Oberland core territory stretching up to the Franconian Forest and the Fichtel Mountains. Mountainous and densely wooded, most of the lands were of less agricultural use, nevertheless mineral resources, predominantly ore deposits led to the construction of numerous mines.

Beside the residence Bayreuth, the separate Oberland and Unterland territories were administered from Hof and Neustadt an der Aisch respectively.

== History ==
The principality arose upon the death of the Hohenzollern burgrave Frederick V of Nuremberg on 21 January 1398, when his lands were partitioned between his two sons: the elder, Burgrave John III received Kulmbach-Bayreuth and the younger, Frederick VI, received the Principality of Ansbach.

The two principalities were once again united under the younger son, Frederick, after John's death on 11 June 1420. At the Council of Constance in 1415, Emperor Sigismund vested Frederick with the hereditary title of an Elector of Brandenburg (as Frederick I). Frederick finally sold his burgravial title to the citizens of the Imperial City of Nuremberg. On his death in 1440, his territories were again divided between his sons: the eldest, John the Alchemist had waived his right of primogeniture and succeeded his father in Kulmbach-Bayreuth, while the second, Frederick Irontooth, received the Brandenburg electorate. Ansbach passed to the third son Albert Achilles.

As John the Alchemist had no male heirs, he renounced his rights in 1457, whereupon Kulmbach-Bayreuth fell to his brother, Albert Achilles. When the eldest brother, the Brandenburg elector Frederick Irontooth abdicated in 1470, Albert united all Hohenzollern territories under his rule. After Albert's death in 1486 the Franconian principalities were finally partitioned according to his Dispositio Achillea disposition, passing to the younger sons of his second marriage with Anna of Saxony, Margrave Siegmund and his brother Frederick II.

=== Elder line ===
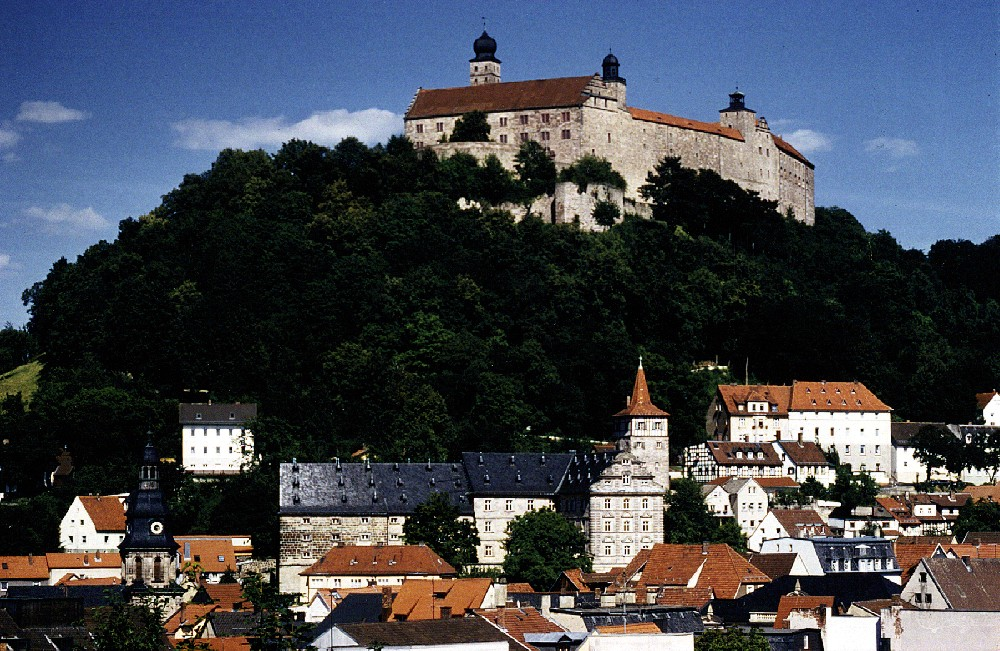
Plassenburg in Kulmbach

While the Brandenburg electorate became the power base for the rising Hohenzollern dynasty, the Principality of Kulmbach-Bayreuth was held by Frederick's descendants, temporarily in personal union with Ansbach. The rulers were commonly known as the Margraves of Brandenburg-Bayreuth (though Bayreuth is nowhere near Brandenburg). Kulmbach-Bayreuth became part of the Franconian Circle in 1500.

After in 1541 the ambitious Margrave Albert Alcibiades assumed the rule over Kulmbach-Bayreuth, he barged onto the battlegrounds of the Schmalkaldic War, several times switching sides between Emperor Charles V and the Lutheran princes of the Schmalkaldic League. In 1552 he sparked the Second Margrave War against Nuremberg and the neighbouring Prince-bishoprics of Würzburg and Bamberg. His soaring plans to re-establish the medieval Duchy of Franconia under his rule ended with his utter defeat and an Imperial ban in 1554.

Albert was succeeded by his cousin Margrave George Frederick in 1557, who from 1577 also ruled in the Duchy of Prussia as regent for his incapable Hohenzollern relative Duke Albert Frederick, Duke of Prussia. With George Frederick's death in 1603, the elder Bayreuth line became extinct. He left his successor, Margrave Christian, younger son of the Brandenburg elector John George, an orderly and functioning state.

=== Younger line ===
Margrave Christian took his residence in Bayreuth; in 1655 he was succeeded by his grandson Christian Ernst, who gained power and influence on Imperial politics in the military rank of a Field marshal. In 1705 his son Prince George William founded the Ordre de la Sincerité, predecessor to the Prussian Order of the Red Eagle. Margrave Frederick, ruling from 1735, and his wife Wilhelmine of Prussia, both patrons of arts and sciences, had the Bayreuth residence largely rebuilt in a distinct Baroque style (Markgrafenstil), including the erection of the Margravial Opera House finished in 1748. A university was founded in 1742 and relocated to Erlangen the next year.

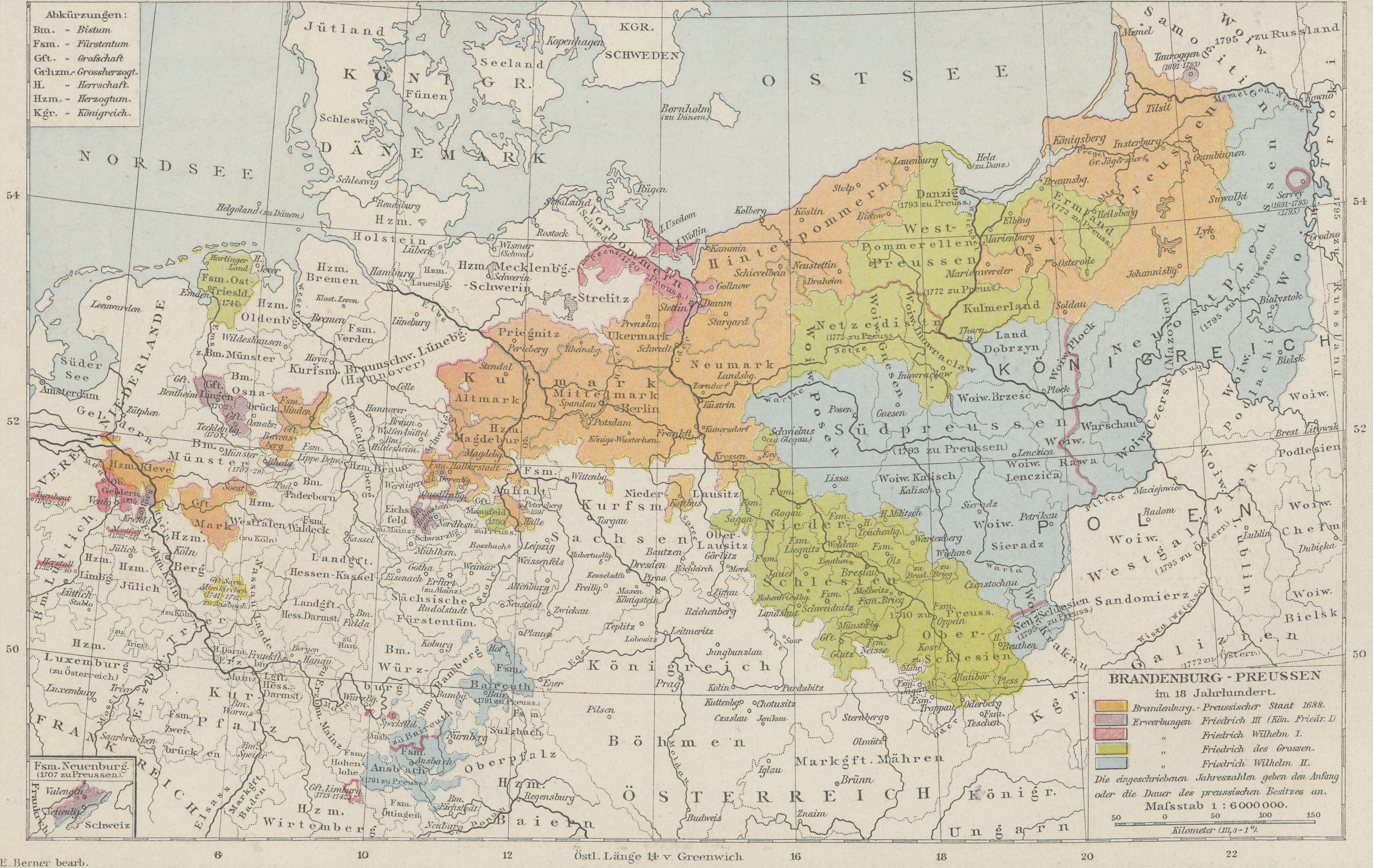
Bayreuth and Ansbach (blue) as part of Prussia

The younger line of the Brandenburg-Bayreuth margraves died out in 1769 with the death of Frederick Christian, whereafter Bayreuth and Ansbach were once again ruled in personal union by Margrave Charles Alexander. On 2 December 1791, Charles Alexander signed a treaty with King Frederick William II of Prussia, whereby he ceded his principalities to the Prussian state against a lifelong annuity. He married socialite Elizabeth Craven and retired to private life in England, while Bayreuth and Ansbach were governed by the Prussian minister Karl August von Hardenberg.

Occupied by French troops during the War of the Fourth Coalition, Prussia had to cede Bayreuth according to the 1807 Treaty of Tilsit. At the 1808 Congress of Erfurt, the French emperor Napoleon offered it for sale to the newly established Kingdom of Bavaria; it changed owners in 1810 against a payment of 15 million francs.

== Margraves ==
- 1398: John III of Nuremberg
- 1420: Frederick I of Brandenburg
- 1440: John IV the Alchemist
- 1457: Albert I Achilles (also Margrave of Brandenburg from 1470)
- 1486: Siegmund
- 1495: Frederick III (also Margrave of Ansbach as Friedrich I)
- 1515: Casimir
- 1527: Albert Alcibiades
- 1553: George Frederick (also Margrave of Ansbach)
- 1603: Christian
- 1655: Christian Ernst
- 1712: George William
- 1726: George Frederick Charles (previously Margrave of Kulmbach from 1708)
- 1735: Frederick
- 1763: Frederick Christian
- 1769: Charles Alexander (to 1791; also Margrave of Ansbach)

== See also ==
- Germans in the American Revolution § Ansbach-Bayreuth
