= Sankt Georgen (Bayreuth) =

District of Bayreuth, Germany

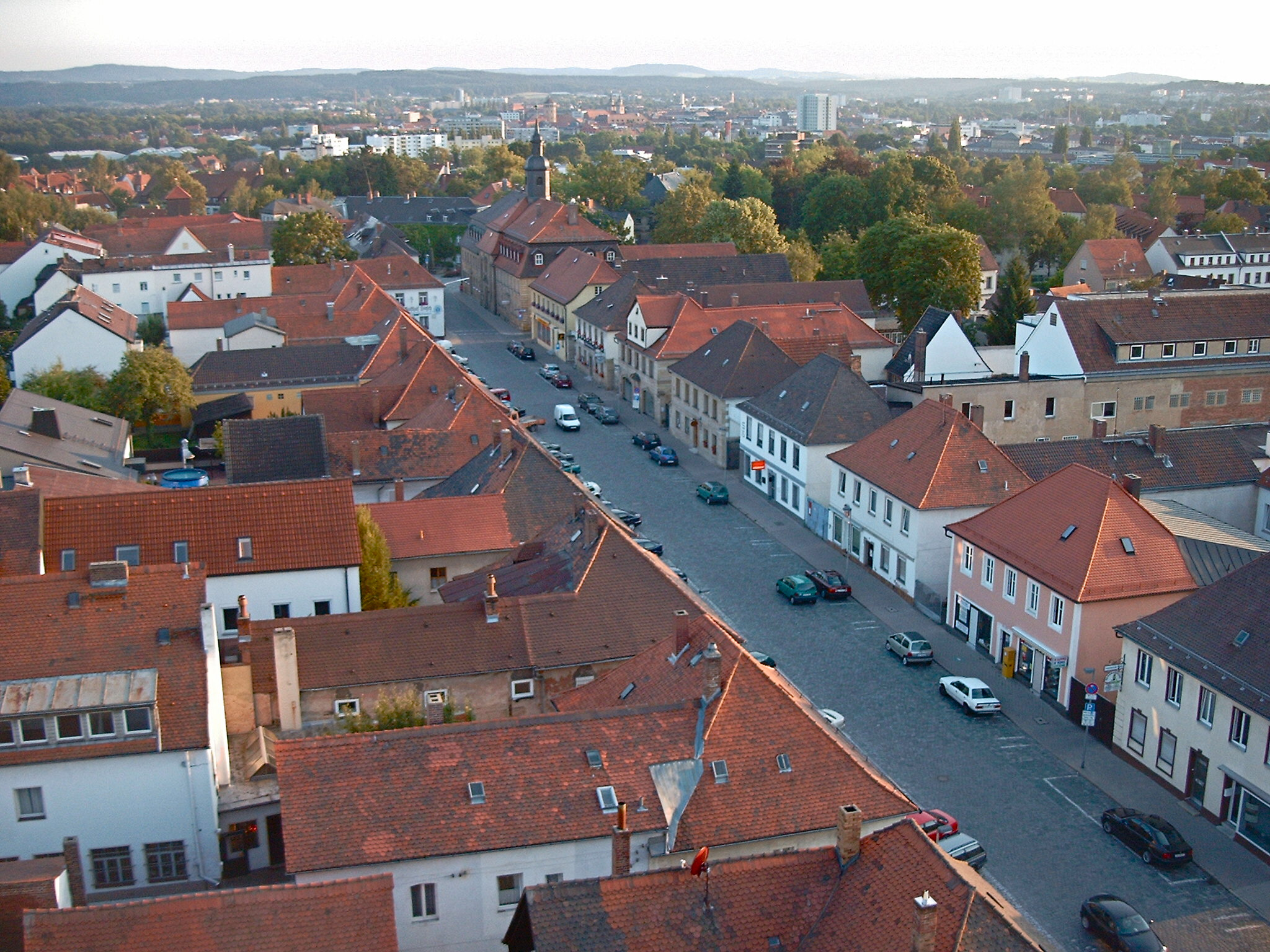
View from the Ordenskirche St. Georgen onto Sankt Georgen Street

Sankt Georgen (German pronunciation: [ˌzaŋkt ˈɡeːɔʁɡn̩]) is an 18th-century planned new town, today a district of the city of Bayreuth in Bavaria.

== Location ==
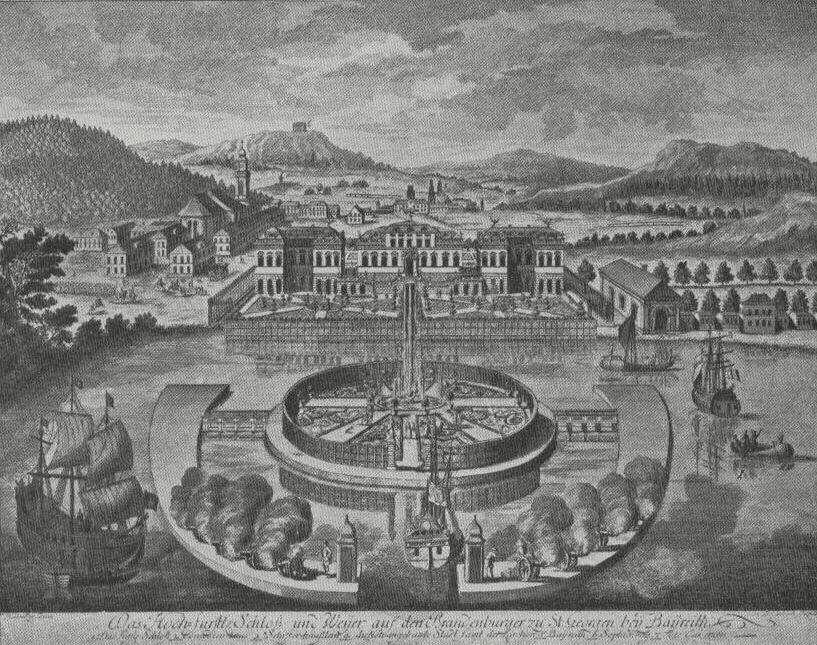
Engraving of the Brandenburger Weiher and the town of Sankt Georgen

Sankt Georgen is located north-east of the city center of Bayreuth on the top of a hill whose southern slope is called the Stuckberg. To the south it slopes down to the valley of the Red Main; to the west to the city railway station; and to the north-east to the industrial area of St. Georgen on the former Brandenburger Weiher (a large man-made mere). The plateau extends eastward to the Bindlacher Berg and the Oschenberg. To the east, Sankt Georgen borders on the district of Laineck.

== Early history - the Brandenburger Weiher ==
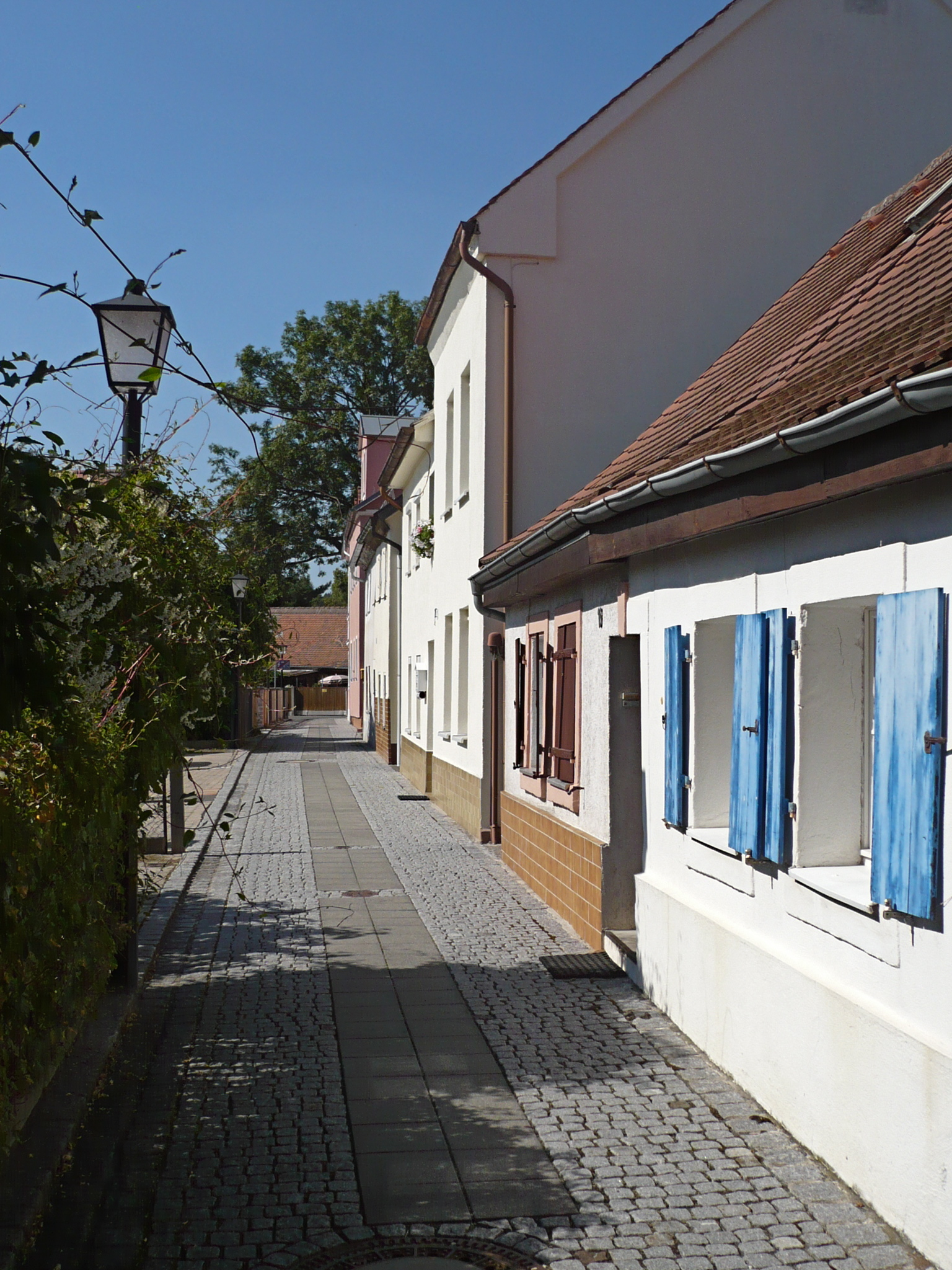
Matrosengasse with the old sailors' houses

Before 1700, the area of Sankt Georgen was virtually uninhabited. The beginnings of the later town of Sankt Georgen am See can be traced back to the construction of the Brandenberger Weiher. The county register from 1499 mentions a small pond here. In 1508, the "Weiher uffm Brand" (pond on the burn) and an associated "Weiherhaus" are documented. (Brand and Brandberg referred to the area below the Hohe Warte ridge that had been cleared by fire). Margrave Friedrich had the pond enlarged from 1509 with corvée labour. In 1516, his successors further extended the body of water until it had a surface area of 565 Tagewerks, according to a 1530 survey. It was filled from the Warme Steinach through a canal branching off at Döhlau and drained through two weirs in the direction of Bindlach.

The Weiher was used as a fish pond and was the domain of the margravial court. As late as the 16th century, the name Brandenburger Weiher was officially used because it belonged to the Margraves of Brandenburg. A document from 1515 shows that the Franciscan monastery Sankt Jobst on the nearby Oschenberg was entitled to three hundredweight of carp out of an average of 200 hundredweight per year of fish caught there.

In the late seventeenth century Crown prince Georg Wilhelm had developed a passion for the navy on his Grand Tour to England and Holland, and this had a lasting impact on Sankt Georgen. In 1695 he had a modest wooden castle built on the lake shore, which was replaced by a stone building between 1701 and 1707. Also in 1695 he had a carpenter from Münchberg build his first ship. Four magnificent frigates armed with small guns followed later, with which sea battles were staged on the lake. Six one-story sailor's houses and one two-storey captain's house were built on the south-west bank.

== Margraviate of Bayreuth ==
=== Under Georg Wilhelm ===
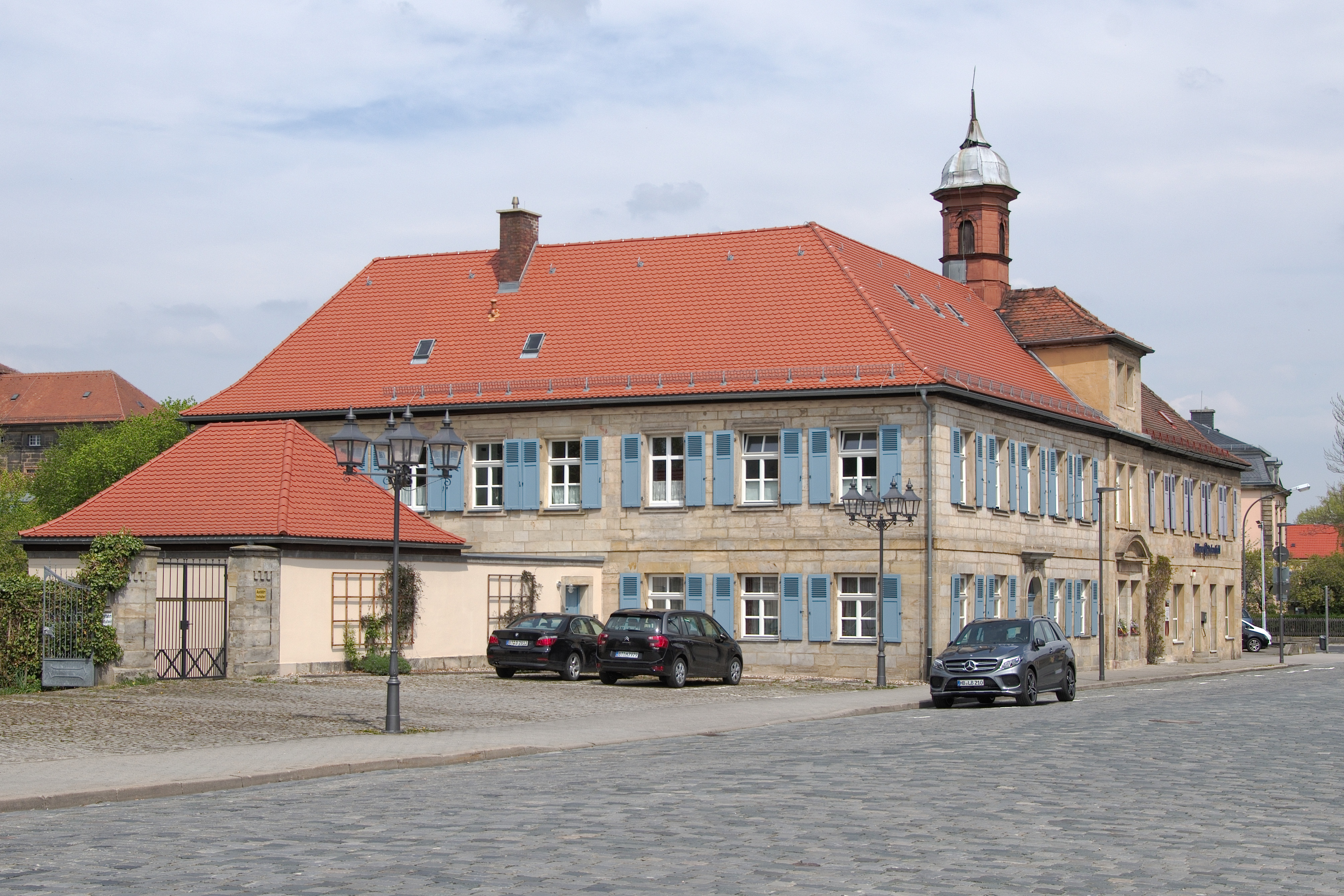
The former town hall

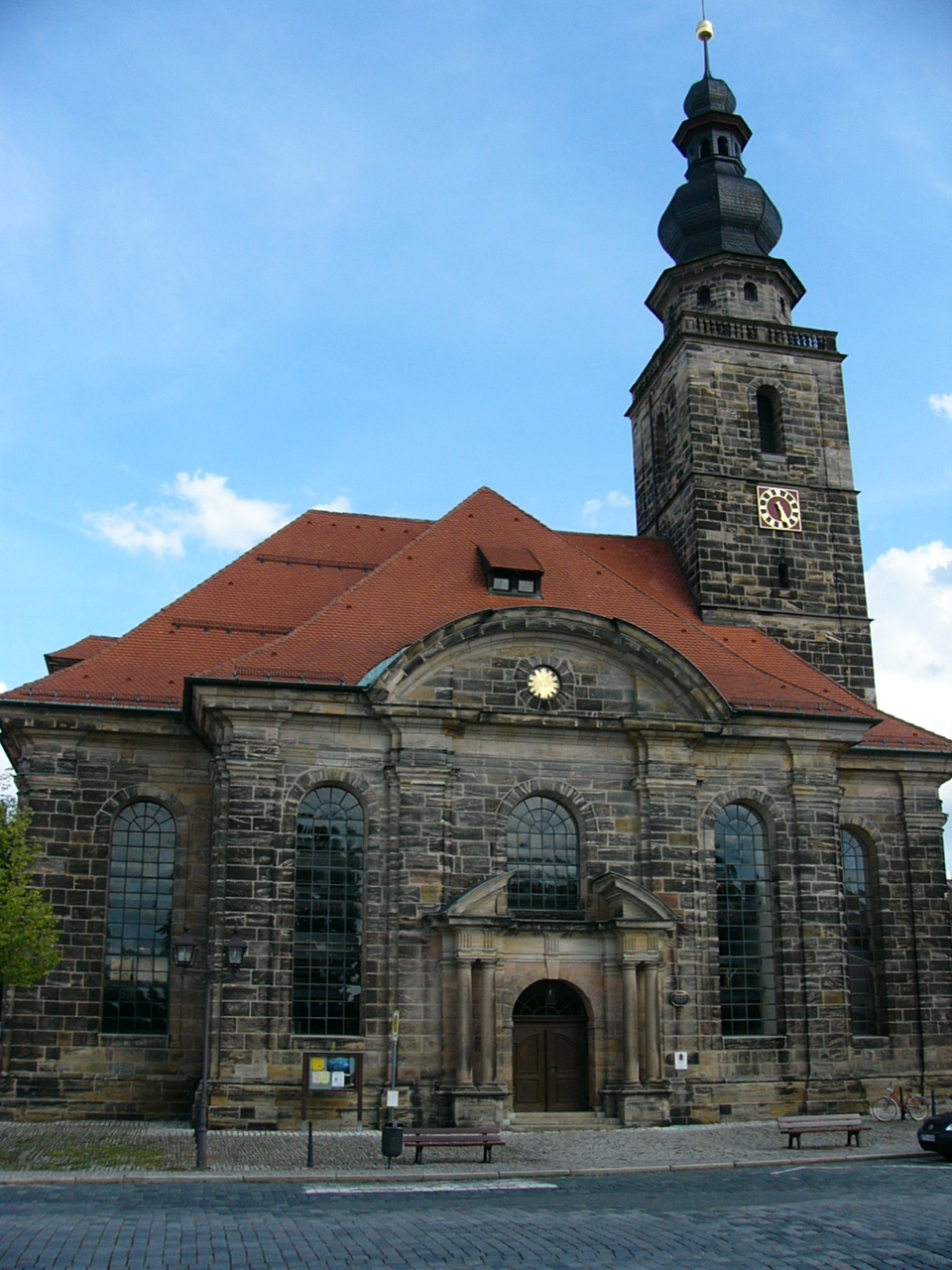
The Ordenskirche

In a decree of March 28, 1702 to the Bayreuth city council, Margrave Christian Ernst of Bayreuth indicated that his son and heir Georg Wilhelm wanted to erect "various buildings" on the Brandenburger Weiher. Land was acquired for the construction project, with other parcels of pasture land given in compensation to its former owners. On September 2, 1702, Georg Wilhelm's wife, Princess Sophia, laid the cornerstone for the new planned suburb of Sankt Georgen. Since Georg Wilhelm spent a lot of time that year as a general in imperial service in the camp in the Rhine Palatinate, his mother Sophie Luise initially personally took charge of the construction project, but she died in October 1702. In 1704 there is mention of the prince's "three houses in St. Georg am See"("St. George on the lake").

The new town was laid out on a symmetrical plan, in the baroque style, in 1709. As in Versailles, the palace was the focal point. Two parallel streets on either side of the palace gardens, each with 24 similar houses, were planned with "the most beautiful regularity"; however only the houses in the eastern section were actually built. The owner of the first house (St. Georgen No. 29) was Georg Wilhelm's mother Princess Sophia Luise, while the owner of the second was Prince Georg Wilhelm's valet de chambre von Löwenberg. Other houses were built by nobles or belonged to commoners who were in the service of or dependent on Georg Wilhelm. In addition to the 24 "typical houses" along the main street, known as first as Bayreuther Gass (and since 1889 as St. Georgen Street), there were soon several smaller cottages on the edge of the settlement that were not subject to the strict design requirements of regularity.

In 1708 the foundation stone for the barracks of the Grenadier Guard was laid, but the plan for a town hall opposite the church, outlined in 1709, was never realised. The eventual town hall was created by repurposing the buildings at St. Georgen 27 and 29 which had been joined around 1745 and then used as storage by the faience factory.

The street was dominated by the church of St. Sophia, begun in 1705 and consecrated in 1711 (Georg Wilhelm's mother was Sophia Luise, his wife Sophia and his daughter Christiane Sophie Wilhelmine). The name indicated that it was originally intended to be a family and court church. However Georg Wilhelm decided to make it the centre of worship for his newly created Ordre de la Sincérité and after its consecration it became generally known as the Ordenskirche St. Georgen.

As Margrave from 1712 to 1726, Georg Wilhelm ruled in an absolutist manner, emulating the example of Louis XIV and building up considerable debts. In 1706 he had an opera house built to the west of the Sankt Georgen palace, and in 1708 the infantry barracks on the southern edge of the settlement. The construction of the "prison and work house" (today's prison) began in 1724, but the building complex was only completed in 1735. Under Margrave Alexander (1769-1791) the building was used as a "madhouse" or Sankt-Georgen-Hospital. It was converted into a "modern insane asylum" at the beginning of the 19th century.

=== Under George Friedrich Karl and Friedrich ===
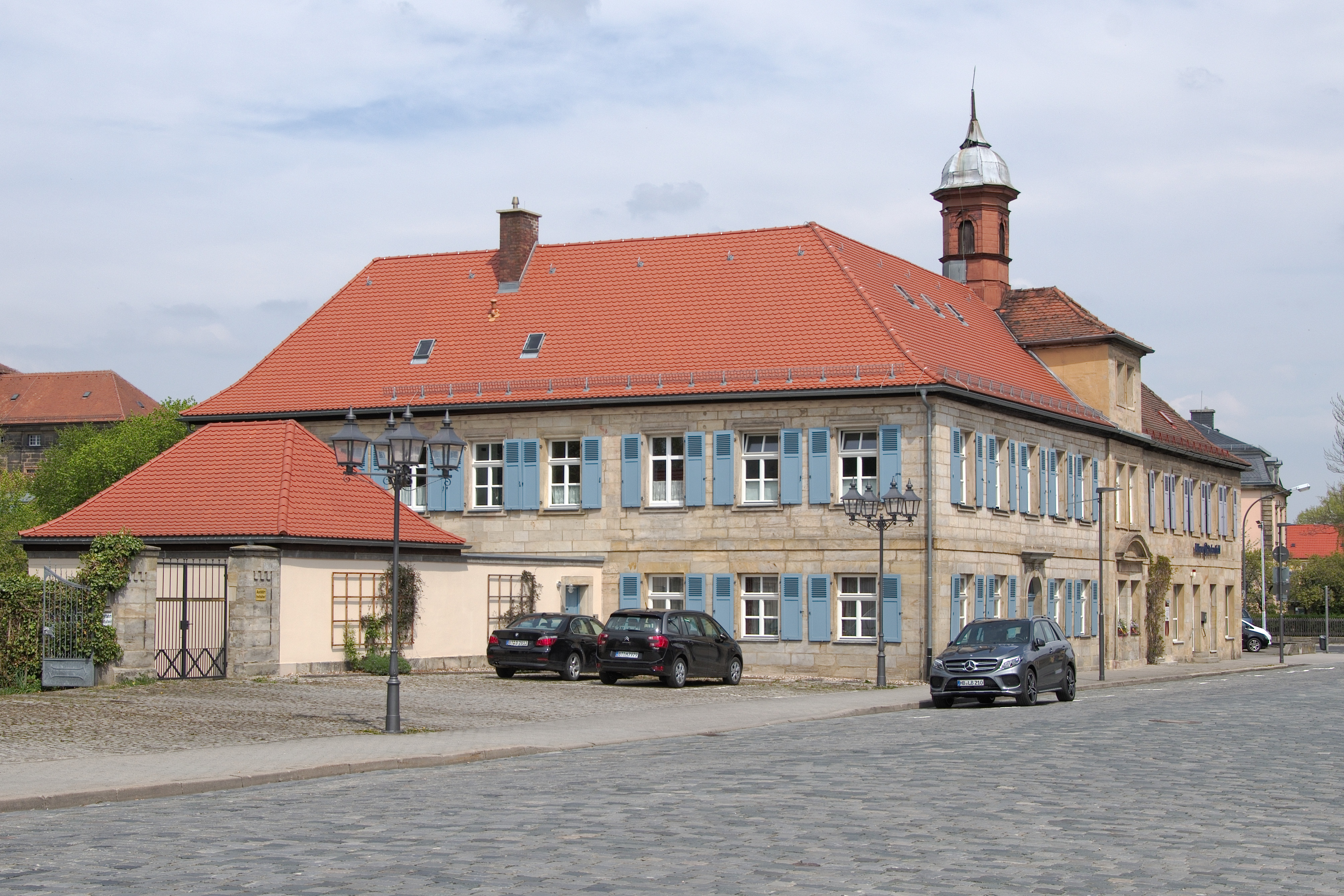
The former town hall

Georg Wilhelm's successor Georg Friedrich Karl (1727-1735) showed no interest in expanding the town. Friedrich III (1735–1763) 1741 ordered the construction of the Gravenreuther Stift, an early retirement home with its own church, which was completed in 1744. In 1745 he granted the town of Sankt Georgen the privilege of its own independent town council. In the first election, 28-year-old master baker Adolph Fränkel was elected mayor by the 40 homeowners who acted as voters. The mayor and the six-member council were given local judicial authority. Since the higher authorities in Bayreuth threatened to delay the construction of the town hall, a town hall was quickly created by acquiring and connecting the two houses. A ratskeller was opened there and a council innkeeper was appointed. However, because the building soon proved to be too large for this purpose, two thirds of the building was sold to the Protestant church administration in 1755.

Up to 1733 Sankt Georgen then had been allowed to hold two horse and cattle markets per year, and in that year it asked for permission to hold monthly cattle markets. At the same time, the mayor and the city council advocated a reduction in customs duties for Jewish traders, who represented a significant element in these markets. A Jewish cattle dealer had to pay six and a half kreuzers when they arrived on foot on market day, and ten and a half kreuzers if they came on horseback. If he arrived the day before, this special taxation could rise to as high as 31 1/2 Kreuzer. The Margrave therefore had the customs duties reduced by half and the number of markets increased – but not to the desired extent. It was not until 1773 that cattle markets were authorised every second Tuesday. At that time, cattle could only be sold outside the Margraviate of Bayreuth if they had previously been unsuccessfully offered at least once on a domestic market. In order to better control the operations of the cattle markets, the market street was blocked off with barriers.

=== Under Friedrich Christian and Alexander ===
Friedrich Christian, who ruled from 1763 to 1769, ended seafaring on the Brandenburger Weiher, and all the sailors were dismissed. A final major lake festival was celebrated under Margrave Alexander in 1771, and the lake was then drained in 1775. At that time, specialists such as parchment makers and tobacco pipe makers worked in Sankt Georgen; a lens grinding shop and a playing card factory were established, and in 1781 a bell foundry was added.

== Kingdom of Bavaria ==
In the harsh economic circumstances of the Napoleonic Wars, the people of Sankt Georgen increasingly wished to join Bayreuth. In 1811 the town and the city were united by King Maximilian I Joseph of Bavaria under a single municipality, ending 109 years of independence. The old town of Sant Georgen became the 13th district of the city, while the northern area (Grüner Baum, Matrosengasse, Straße nach Berneck) formed the 14th district.

Since every house owner in Sankt Georgen had the right to brew, there were more than 20 brewers out of the approximately 900 inhabitants. However, according to the new Bavarian Municipal Code, all suburbs were to cease to have any independent rights. This was not accepted by the citizens of Sankt Georgen without objections, and prompted several petitions to the king. As late as 1819, they were demanding self-government back, but in vain.

In the 1884 regulations for the cattle markets in Bayreuth, in addition to the cattle market in the main street, the pig market at the lower fountain and the fattening cattle market on the square in front of the upper fountain are also listed. The impressive drive of up to 1500 cattle and 450 pigs also attracted buyers from Baden, Württemberg, Saxony and even Russia.

== 20th century ==
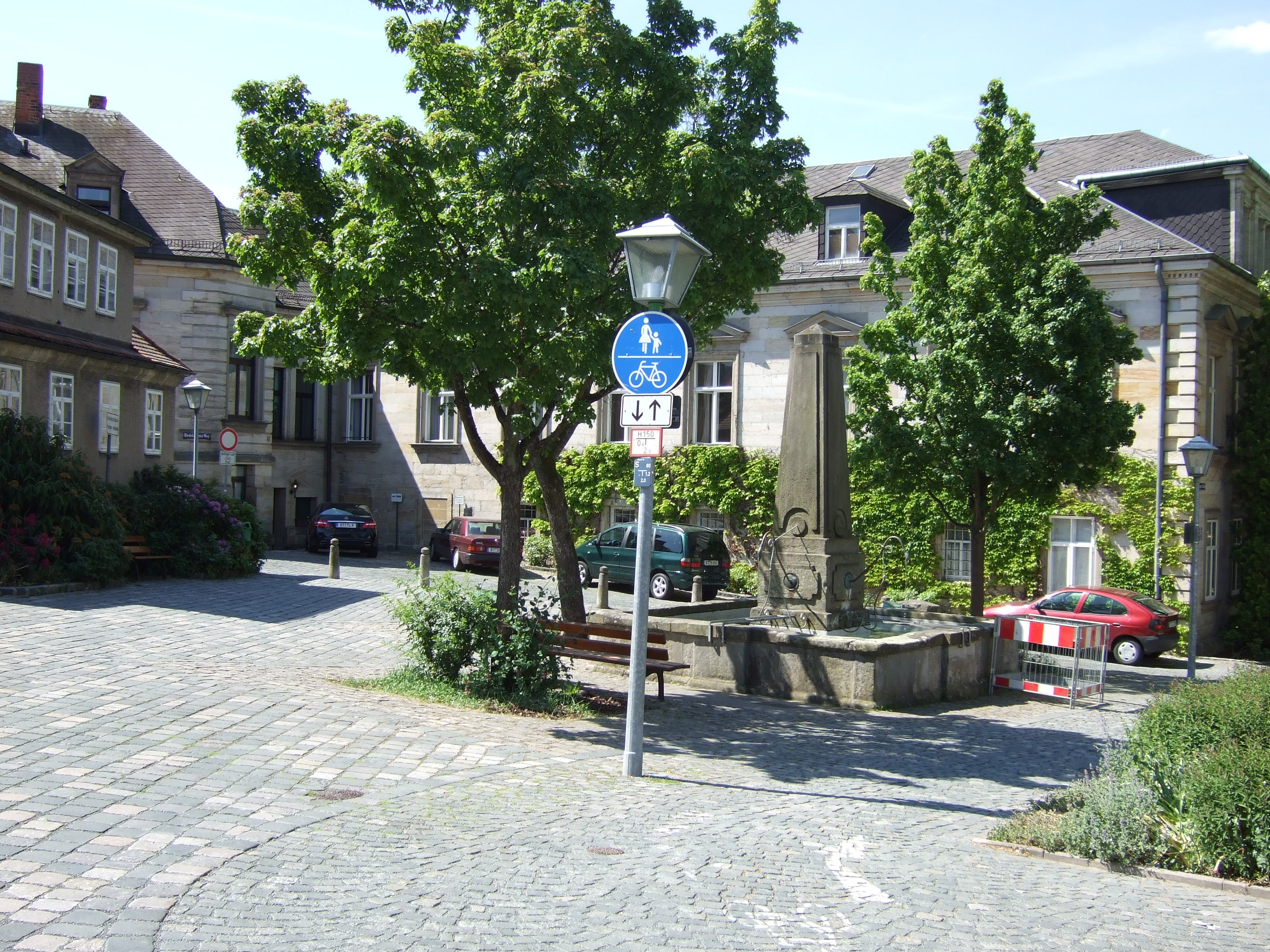
The "Saubrunnen"

The Market Ordinance of 1914 prohibited cattle markets on Jewish holidays. However under pressure from the National Socialists, "conducting business in the Jewish language (Yiddish)" was banned in 1934. With the construction of the Rotmainhalle, the Sankt Georgen cattle markets were relocated there in 1935.

In keeping with Bayreuth tradition, there were also bakers brewing beer in Sankt Georgen. As the last "Becknbräu" in the city, Franz Götschel (Sankt Georgen 25) practiced this double profession until 1961. Opposite, the Kolb drugstore operated one of Bayreuth's first two gas stations with a gas pump on the street.

At the upper end of Brandenburger Strasse, the Royal Bavarian Councilor of Commerce Otto Rose (1839-1984) donated a sandstone fountain. The Rose Fountain is popularly known as the "Saubrunnen" ("sows' fountain") after the wooden drinking trough that previously existed on the site.

In 1940, the first branch of the Municipal Savings Bank in Bayreuth was opened to the public in the building at Brandenburger Strasse 49. In the 1950s, the Rex cinema opened on Brandenburger Strasse. In the 1990s, on the Markgrafenallee, the new building for the Bayreuth District Office, which had been located on Tunnelstrasse, was built on a 1.7-hectare site. Groundbreaking took place on March 16, 1992, and on July 15, 1994, it was inaugurated.

== Buildings and sights ==
- Sankt Georgen Castle, later the Ordensschloss St. George: (Today part of the St. Georgen-Bayreuth Correctional Facility): The first castle only existed from 1701 to 1724. Its architect was Antonio della Porta and construction management was in the hands of the "Commissarius" Johann Cadusch from Graubünden. After falling into disrepair, it was demolished. The rapid construction and the extensive use of wood rather than more solid stone constructions were probably responsible for the buildings short life. The successor building was started immediately after the previous one had been razed and was completed in 1727. The architect and site manager was Johann David Räntz the Elder, a son of Elias Räntz. After Bayreuth became part of Prussia in 1792 the castle was used as a warehouse and granary. In the 19th century and during the First World War, the building served as a reserve hospital. Today the castle is part of the St. Georgen-Bayreuth prison.
- Ordenskirche or religious order church: In 1705 the foundation stone was laid for the church, which was originally named the Sophienkirche.

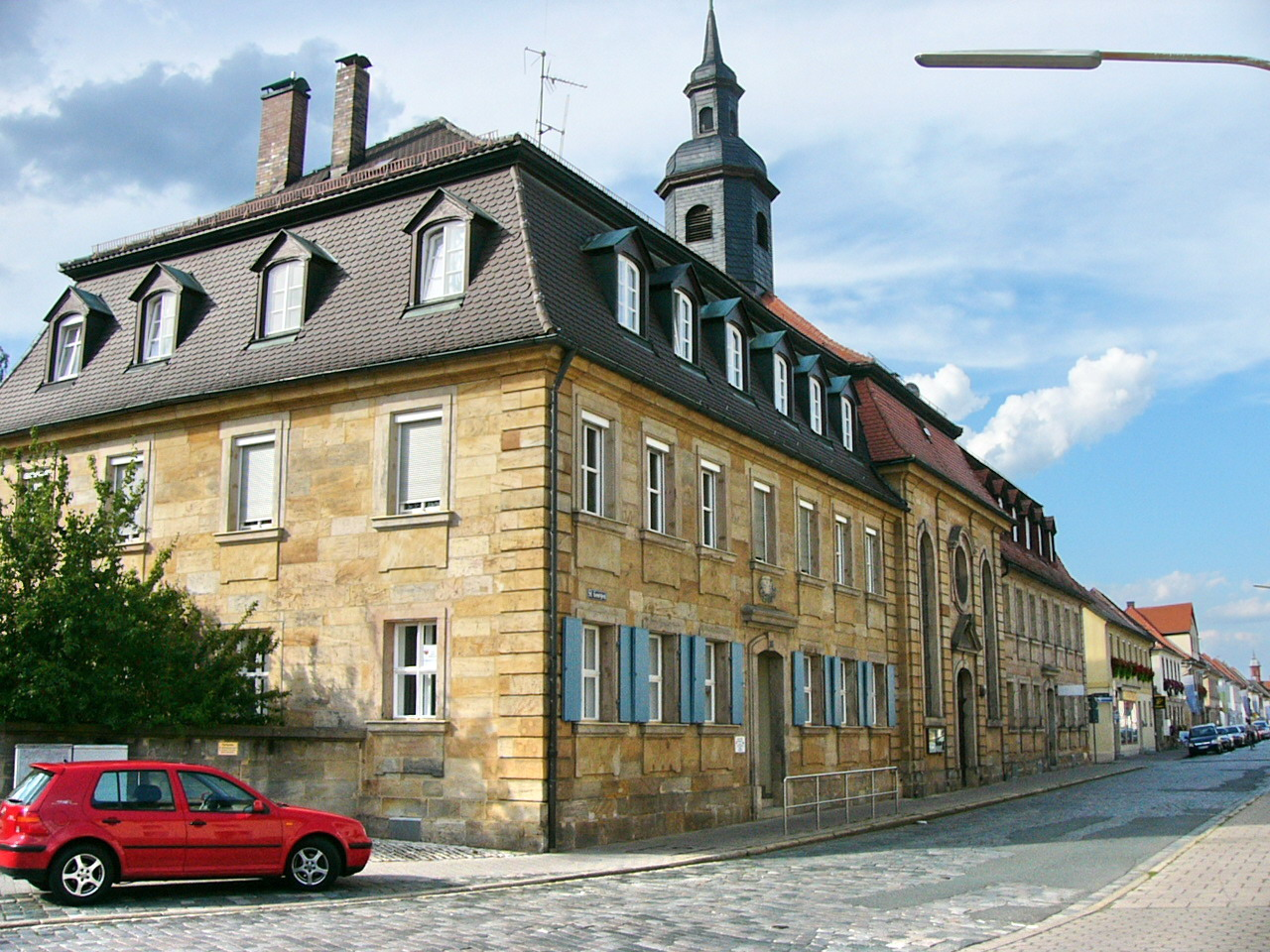
Gravenreuth Abbey

- Gravenreuth Abbey: In his will of July 30, 1735, Georg Christoph von Gravenreuth provided for the construction of a hospital and a chapel in St. Georgen. The foundation's assets were further increased by additional donations. The abbey was built in 1743 and inaugurated in August 1744. Von Gravenreuth, who died in 1736, was reburied by Floß in the crypt of Gravenreuth Abbey. The right wing of the building had been sold before the end of the 18th century, and the left wing housed the main Sankt Georgen police station for many years. As a result of hyperinflation, the abbey was financially ruined in 1923 and placed under the administration of the city. In 1981, the parish of Sankt Georgen bought the building for DM 25,000.
- Typical houses: The streetscape of the historic core of St. Georgen is characterized by so-called typical houses - 24 identical two-storey buildings with a hipped roof. The long plots of land provided enough space behind the houses for kitchen gardens, making the householders largely self-sufficient.
- Princess' House: Margravine Sophia laid the foundation stone for the building, also known as the Princess House, in 1722. Intended as the first house in a second row of houses, it remained the only building in this part of the town for a long time, alongside the penitentiary and workhouse that was built a little later. It was intended for the then 21-year-old daughter Christiane Sophie, who hardly ever lived there. In 1735 she sold it to Margrave Friedrich for his daughter Princess Elisabeth Friederike Sophie. The building stood empty from 1763 before being used as an insane asylum in 1784. Two larger extensions date from 1789 and 1806. The institution closed in 1870 after the construction of the district insane asylum in the Wendelhöfen district.

In the early 1870s, the brothers Bruno and Oskar Teuscher acquired the building complex. Oskar and his brother-in-law Albert Dietz, who had moved to Bayreuth in 1885, set up a biscuit factory there. In 1900 Oskar Teuscher became the sole owner, and two years later his son-in-law Wilhelm Koch joined the company as a partner. As a result, a prosperous candy, biscuit and gingerbread factory was established in the outbuildings; the main building was used as an office and prestigious apartment. During the Bayreuth festival, Koch regularly received illustrious guests there: Auguste Rodin visited the house, and King Edward VII and Queen Alexandra stayed there several times. In 1956 the factory ceased operations.

- Margravial penitentiary and workhouse: The complex from the years 1724 to 1735 belonged to the prison of St. Georgen-Bayreuth.
- Seamen's houses in the Matrosengasse: The Brandenburger Weiher was drained in 1775 and an industrial area was built on its former site. The north retaining wall of the lake was not removed until the late 1970s, and the Weiherstraße has been there ever since.

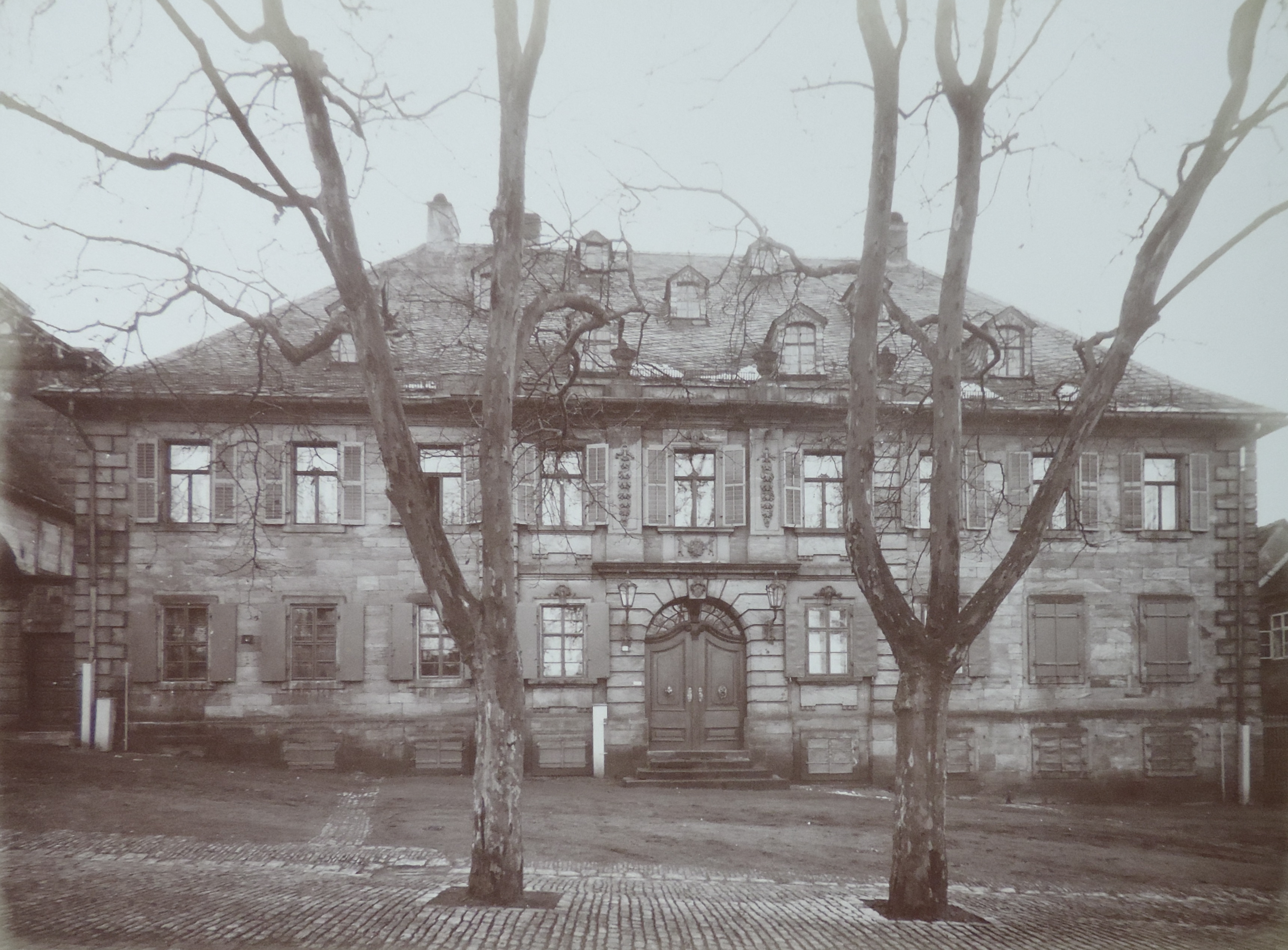
Leers'sches Orphanage

- Leers'sches Orphanage : (Bernecker Straße 11) In 1836 the orphanage for "six boys and six girls" donated by Christoph Friedrich Leers was inaugurated. The building, which was damaged by fire in 1860, was demolished at the end of the 19th century and rebuilt by 1902. After the First World War it housed a municipal crèche for infants, and from 1967 to 1981 a day care center for remedial education. The German Typewriter Museum is currently housed there. The building is to be renovated and supplemented by a new building for the city archive.
- Communal brewery: The former community brewery (behind the church 14), a sandstone ashlar building from 1706, is now used as an equipment house for the "Brannaburg" fire brigade, one of 12 independent departments of the Bayreuth volunteer fire brigade.
- Former Insel Chocolate and Candy Factory (see below)
- Sandstone cellar: The houses at Kellerstraße 6-14 (even numbers) enclose a rectangular courtyard that lacks the symmetry of the rest of the local area. The property was listed as "Velsenkeller" in Johann Riediger's Carte Spéciale from 1745. This is where numerous tunnels hewn into the castle sandstone begin, which in their entirety form the "Star of Sankt Georgen". Beer was stored here at a constant temperature of 6 degrees in these branching and partially overlapping cellars, which were several hundred meters long. Smaller neighboring cellar systems, which are located along Brandenburger Strasse down to the main train station, also served in part as storm sewers and sewers. The labyrinth, also incorrectly referred to as "catacombs", has not yet been fully explored. At least once a year there are guided tours through a small part of the tunnel system.
- Cellar art museum: "Grotte des Zauberer" by the long-term local artist Wo Sarazen, who died in 2020, in a rock cellar system on the upper Brandenburger Straße
- Brandenburger Straße 32: Palatial home of the Rose manufacturing family, built around 1760 by Johann Georg Pfeiffer. The owner of the faience manufactory at the time set up his factory and storage building on the property behind the house. In 1825, Johann Christian Schmidt bought the manufactory and gradually converted the business into a sugar refinery in 1835. Later, Schmidt's son-in-law Louis Rose took over the house and factory.
- St. Georgen Cemetery: One of five cemeteries in Bayreuth, located in the south-east of the district of Sankt Georgen. Until the 20th century it was the burial place for all Bayreuth residents who lived north of the Red Main. The cemetery is a listed monument with its cemetery wall, the entrance portal by the Baroque sculptor Elias Räntz and several Baroque, Rococo and Classicist graves. The tombstone for the magistrate and manufacturer Christoph Friedrich Leers is directly adjacent to the partly heavily weathered entrance.

At least 36 deceased babies of forced laborers who were buried there from March 1943 lie in the cemetery. Their mothers, who mostly came from Poland and the Soviet Union, mainly worked in agriculture in Bayreuth and the surrounding area, but also in spinning mills and armaments factories. The location of the graves can no longer be determined. At the end of the Second World War, the complex was expanded to include a war cemetery, making this is one of the largest war cemeteries in Upper Franconia.

In 2021, a grave was rediscovered in which six young French soldiers were buried between December 24, 1870 and March 16, 1871. They were among several hundred prisoners of war of the Franco-Prussian War who were interned in Sankt Georgen prison and died there of illness.

== Vanished buildings ==
The air raids on Bayreuth towards the end of the Second World War did not spare Sankt Georgen. Due to the proximity of the main train station and the immediately adjacent mechanical cotton spinning mill with the ball bearing works outsourced there, the area around Markgrafenallee and Brandenburger Straße was particularly affected. The following were destroyed by aerial bombs in April 1945:

- the main building of the mechanical cotton spinning mill
- the former regional court prison (also: "Regional Court-Frohnfeste") on Markgrafenallee, last used as a prison for women. In royal Bavarian times, death sentences were carried out in the courtyard of the regional court prison. For this purpose, the guillotine was brought in from Munich, and the executioner also came from outside. Admission tickets were issued to interested spectators, and shortly before the execution was to take place, the "poor man's bell" began to ring.
- the former girls' school, a three-storey sandstone building from around 1880, as an auxiliary hospital branch of the war hospital in the building of the Oberrealschule.

As in many places in the city, notable buildings were demolished in Sankt Georgen after the Second World War, including:

- the "Hutzlershäuschen". The smallest house in the district on the corner of St. Georgen/Bernecker Strasse was not one of the standard houses, but "had character and fitted into the street scene". It was demolished in 1969 to make way for a new building.
- the inn and bakery Michael Seuß at the junction of Grüner Baum and Bernecker Straße. It had to make way for a new restaurant.
- 1983 the "Villa Wild", an unplastered brick house in the Wilhelmine style, built in 1904.
- 1993 the "Pförtnerhäuschen" in Brandenburger Straße, a one-storey sandstone building with a tent roof from 1922.
- Baywa warehouse: The Baywa warehouse that characterizes the townscape at Sankt Georgen station – built in 1918 by the Knorr company as an oatmeal factory – was bought by a housing association in 2016 and demolished in July 2017. As early as April 1989, the former Knorr oat storage facility was demolished.
- 2020, the former Markgrafentor restaurant at Markgrafenallee 17. The semi-detached house already existed in 1891 and was used as a "beer and restaurant" by 1895 at the latest.

== Industry ==
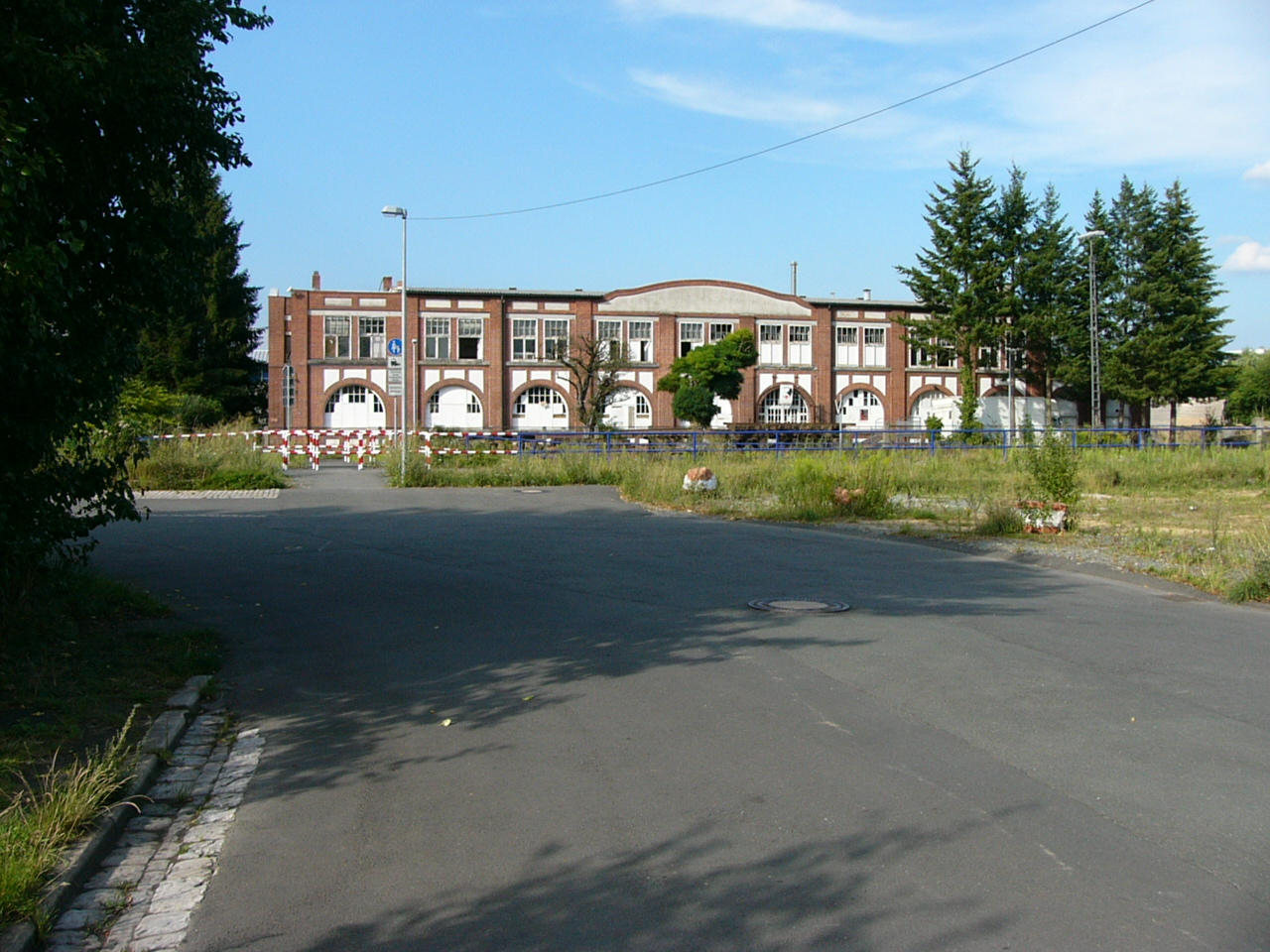
The former Insel factory

- Insel Chocolate and Candy Factory: The Insel chocolate and confectionery factory was built in 1910 on the other side of the station premises and was given its own siding. In 1944 it was temporarily used as a branch of a Creußen armaments factory for the "Insel operation Carl Tabel", where 102 prisoners from the St. Georgen prison had to do forced labor . Production ceased in the 1960s. The building now houses the "Schoko" youth center and is an industrial monument.
- Rose'sche sugar factory: The sugar refinery owned by the brothers Theodor and Johann Christian Schmidt at Brandenburger Strasse 34 was relocated from Wunsiedel to Sankt Georgen in 1834. In August 1838, Theodor Schmidt issued factory regulations according to which every worker was entitled to two to four liters of beer during the working day. In 1849 he created health and pension insurance for his employees. In 1877 the company employed 121 workers and processed 150,000 quintals of cane sugar from overseas. In the early 1870s, JC Schmidt's son-in-law Louis Rose took over the company and passed it on to his sons Otto and Carl Emil. It was closed in 1900 due to outdated machinery and growing competition, and the factory building was demolished in the early 1920s. On April 8, 1894, workers at the factory formed a consumer cooperative with the Consum-Verein. A first attempt by workers in the nearby mechanical cotton spinning mill to set up such a facility in 1872 came to nothing.
- Dairy farm: In December 1941, the new building for the dairy cooperative of the Bayreuth dairy cooperative was opened on the outer Bernecker Straße. It was in operation from 1954 as Milchhof Bayreuth-Kemnath and finally as Käserei Bayreuth until the early 1990s. A hardware store was set up on the site of the Milchhof after it was demolished.
- Water mill on the Red Main, located between Sankt Georgen and Laineck, was built in 1707 by Johann Müller, who also ran the ducal mill in western Bayreuth. Its name refers to the Lainecker Hölzlein forest, which is now cut through by the federal highway 9. At first, grain was ground there on several floors and ploughshares were ground. In 1874 the mill was brought up to the latest state of the art and henceforth referred to as an art mill. In 1876 a turbine was installed instead of a water wheel, which supplied electricity for Laineck and Sankt Johannis. In 1934, the power lines were removed again during the construction of the autobahn. In 1919 Christof Leupold acquired the property and converted it into a metal goods factory. Knives and cutlery were mainly made there until 1978.

== Transport links ==
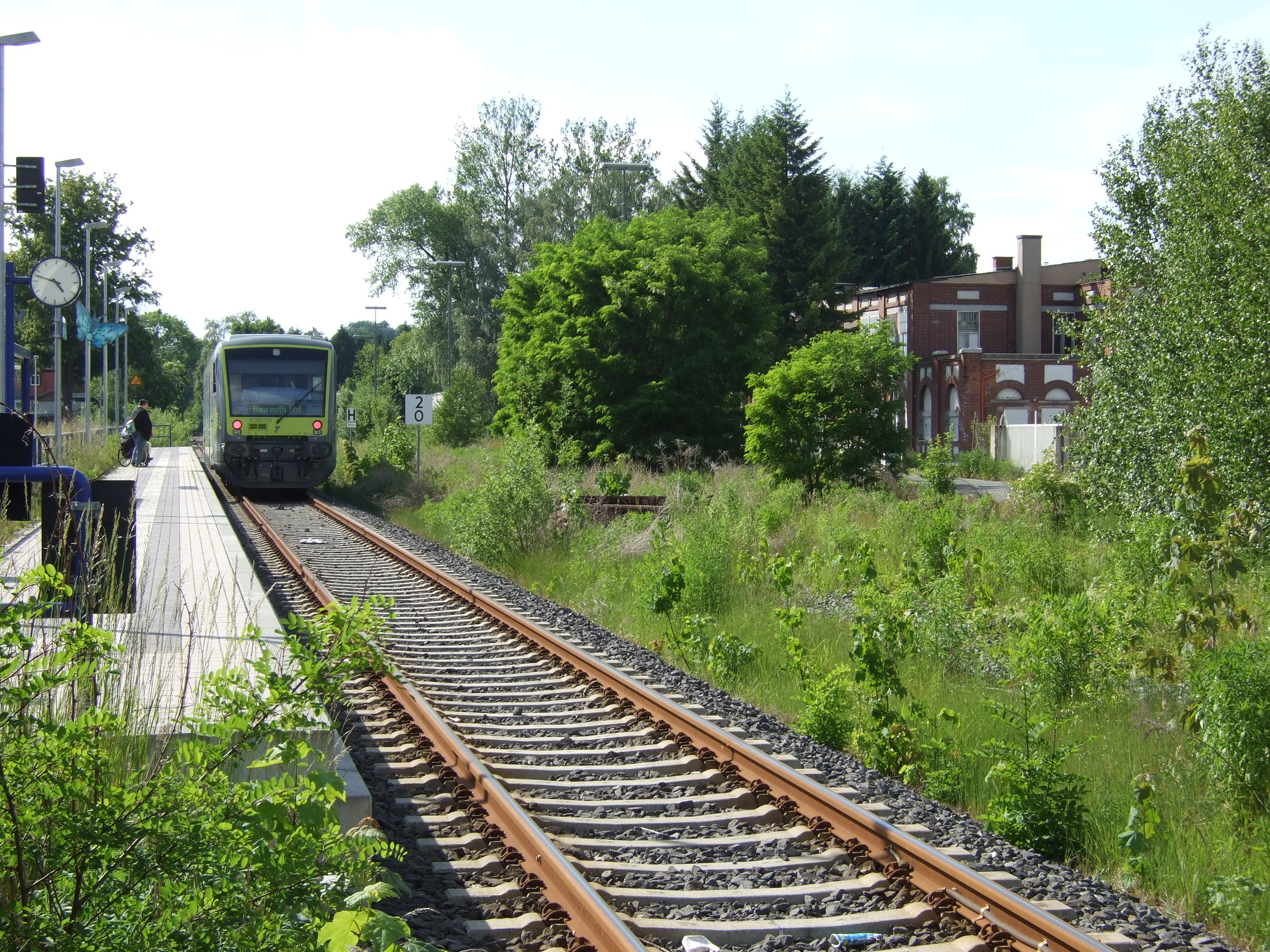
Bayreuth Sankt Georgen halt

Sankt Georgen had a railway station on the Bayreuth–Warmensteinach railway line which opened in 1896 and was the second most important in the city for a century. After the turn of the millennium, the facilities were reduced to a minimum and the station, slightly moved to the east, reopened as a halt in January 2007.

The main road thoroughfares are the Brandenburger Straße, Sankt Georgen and Markgrafenallee, Grüner Baum and Bernecker Straße. In the south, Albrecht-Dürer-Strasse (Bundesstraße 2) marks the border with the district of Hammerstatt. Bundesautobahn 9, which can be reached via the nearby Bayreuth Nord junction, runs along the eastern edge of the district.

== Notable people ==
- Max von der Grün (1926-2005), writer, was born in the rear building of the property behind the church 1. A plaque commemorating the house where he was born was attached to the wrong building by the Bayreuth city administration on May 31, 2012. In 1983, the Bayreuth City Council rejected the awarding of the local culture prize to Max von der Grün by a majority vote.
- Christoph Friedrich Leers (1769-1825), magistrate and manufacturer, famous mainly for his social commitment. During his lifetime, he promoted, among other things, the welfare of the poor in Bayreuth and was involved in the founding of several charitable organizations. He designated his estate as a foundation for the construction of the Leers orphanage. The library of the orphanage is the oldest known and still existing children's and youth library in Bayreuth.
