= Johanna Magdalena of Saxe-Altenburg =

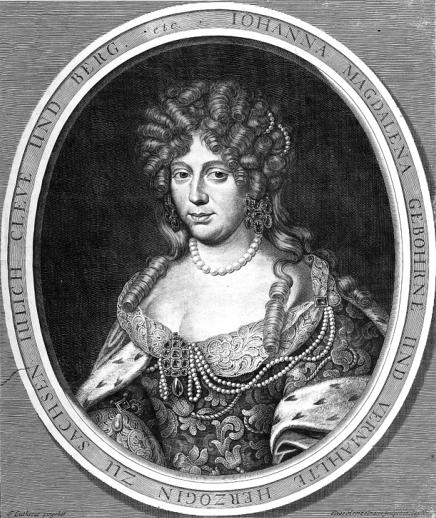
- Johanna Magdalena of Saxe-Altenburg, copper engraving by Johann Hainzelmann, in the Kupferstichkabinett in Dresden (item A 26876 in A 288ab, 4 (D XVI-XVIII))

Duchess consort of Saxe-Weissenfels
- Tenure: 1671–1680
- Born: 14 January 1656; Altenburg
- Died: 22 January 1686 (aged 30); Weißenfels
- Burial: Church of Neu-Augustenburg castle in Weißenfels
- Spouse: Johann Adolf I, Duke of Saxe-Weissenfels
- Issue among others...: Magdalene Sibylle, Duchess of Saxe-Eisenach; Johann Georg, Duke of Saxe-Weissenfels; Princess Johanna Wilhelmina; Christian, Duke of Saxe-Weissenfels; Anna Maria, Countess of Promnitz; Sophia, Margravine of Brandenburg-Bayreuth; Johann Adolf II, Duke of Saxe-Weissenfels
- House: House of Wettin
- Father: Frederick William II, Duke of Saxe-Altenburg
- Mother: Magdalene Sibylle of Saxony

Johanna Magdalena of Saxe-Altenburg (14 January 1656 in Altenburg – 22 January 1686 in Weißenfels) was a member of the House of Wettin. She was a Duchess of Saxe-Altenburg by birth and by marriage a Duchess of Saxe-Weissenfels-Querfurt.

== Life ==
=== The last member of the Saxe-Altenburg line ===
Johanna Magdalena was the only daughter of Duke Frederick William II of Saxe-Altenburg and his wife Magdalene Sibylle of Saxony, the daughter of Elector John George I of Saxony.

She became an orphan at an early age when her parents died in 1668 and 1669. She quickly became a pawn in the hands of her family. In 1671, her uncles John George II and Maurice, in whose residences she frequently stayed, decided that for dynastic reasons, she would marry her cousin, Duke John Adolph I of Saxe-Weissenfels.

At the time, this marriage was politically sensitive, because her elder brother, Hereditary Prince Christian of Saxe-Altenburg, had already died young and her younger brother, Frederick William III, who had succeeded her father as Duke, was still under the guardianship of her uncles and did not have children yet.

The two uncles, members of the Albertine branch of the House of Wettin, speculated that the Altenburg line (part of the Ernestine branch of the House) would die out and via Johanna Magdalena's marriage, Altenburg would fall to the Weissenfels line, which was also part of the Albertine branch. Duke Augustus of Saxe-Weissenfels was in favour of such an inheritance. If the Saxe-Weisenfels were to die out in turn, then their possessions would fall to the other Albertine lines, who were the closest relatives.

Duke Frederick William III died of smallpox, only six months after Johanna Magdalena married. The rival Albertine and Ernestine lines of the House of Wettin both claimed the inheritance. After length discussions, two Ernestine Dukes prevailed: Ernest I of Saxe-Gotha and John Ernest II of Saxe-Weimar. They successfully argued that their dynastic marriages with the Saxe-Altenburg line in the 1630s gave them the older claims.

=== In Saxe-Weissenfels ===
Johanna Magdalena had been educated by the theologicians Johann Stiel and Johann Christfried Sagittarius (1617–1689). She was pious and showed much interest in the ecclesiastical affairs of the duchy. In private, she studied her Bible frequently and wrote numerous comments in its margin. She created prayer books, collections of proverbs and didactic writeups and gave these to relatives and members of the court. She donated gold-embroidered robes to the castle church and later a golden chalice and wafer box. In 1681, she donated a silver baptismal font to the St. Mary Church in Weißenfels. When she died in 1686, commemorative coins were struck, and were handed out at her funeral.

She died on 22 January 1686, at the age of 30 and was buried in a resplendent pewter coffin in the church of Neu-Augustenburg castle. She was popular around her country and cared for the social needs of her subjects. She regularly donated to the poor inhabitants of Weissenfels throughout her life and left them some money in her will.

== Marriage and issue ==
She married on 25 October 1671 in Altenburg with John Adolph I, the son of Duke Augustus of Saxe-Weissenfels from his marriage to Anna Maria of Mecklenburg-Schwerin. They had eleven children:

- Magdalene Sibylle (3 September 1673, Halle – 28 November 1726, Eisenach), married Duke John William III of Saxe-Eisenach.
- August Frederick (15 September 1674, Halle – 16 August 1675, Halle).
- John Adolph (7 June 1676, Halle – 17 June 1676, Halle).
- John George (13 July 1677, Halle – 16 March 1712, Weissenfels), married Friederike Elisabeth of Saxe-Eisenach.
- Unnamed son (born and died on 24 July 1678, Halle).
- Johanna Wilhelmina (20 January 1680, Halle – 4 July 1730, Halle).
- Frederick William (18 January 1681, Weissenfels – 20 November 1681, Weissenfels).
- Christian (23 February 1682, Weissenfels – 28 June 1736, Sangerhausen), married Louise Christiana of Stolberg-Stolberg.
- Anna Maria (17 June 1683 in Weissenfels – 16 March 1731 in Sorau), married Erdmann II of Promnitz.
- Sophia (2 August 1684 in Weissenfels – 6 May 1752 in Slezské Rudoltice in what was then Austrian Silesia), married firstly George William, Margrave of Brandenburg-Bayreuth and secondly Albert Joseph, Count of Hoditz-Wolframitz.
- John Adolph II (4 September 1685, Weissenfels – 16 May 1746, Leipzig), married firstly Johannette Antoinette Juliane of Saxe-Eisenach and secondly Fredericka of Saxe-Gotha-Altenburg.

== Ancestors ==
Ancestors of Johanna Magdalena of Saxe-Altenburg

16. John Frederick I, Elector of Saxony
8. John William, Duke of Saxe-Weimar
17. Sybille of Cleves
4. Frederick William I, Duke of Saxe-Weimar
18. Frederick III, Elector Palatine
9. Dorothea Susanne of Simmern
19. Marie of Brandenburg-Kulmbach
2. Frederick William II, Duke of Saxe-Altenburg
20. Wolfgang, Count Palatine of Zweibrücken
10. Philip Louis, Count Palatine of Neuburg
21. Anna of Hesse
5. Countess Palatine Anna Maria of Neuburg
22. William, Duke of Jülich-Cleves-Berg
11. Anna of Cleves
23. Archduchess Maria of Austria
1. Johanna Magdalena of Saxe-Altenburg
24. Augustus I, Elector of Saxony
12. Christian I, Elector of Saxony
25. Anna of Denmark
6. John George I, Elector of Saxony
26. John George, Elector of Brandenburg
13. Sophie of Brandenburg
27. Sabina of Brandenburg-Ansbach
3. Magdalene Sibylle of Saxony
28. Albert of Prussia
14. Albert Frederick, Duke of Prussia
29. Anna Marie of Brunswick-Lüneburg
7. Duchess Magdalene Sibylle of Prussia
30. William, Duke of Jülich-Cleves-Berg (= 22)
15. Marie Eleonore of Cleves
31. Archduchess Maria of Austria (= 23)

German royalty
| Preceded by Johanna Walpurgis of Leiningen-Westerburg | Duchess consort of Saxe-Weissenfels; 1671–1680 | Vacant Title next held by Fredericka Elisabeth of Saxe-Eisenach |
