= Sophia of Saxe-Weissenfels, Countess of Brandenburg-Bayreuth =

Sophia of Saxe-Weissenfels
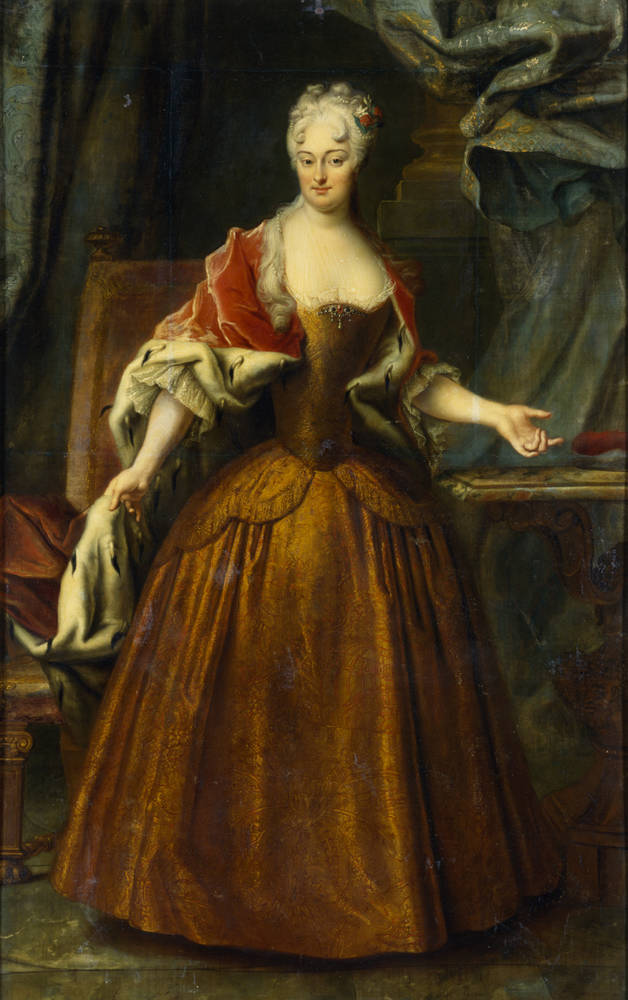
- Sophia of Saxe-Weissenfels - oil painting (c.1720) by Andreas Möller

Margravine consort of Brandenburg-Bayreuth
- Tenure: 1712 - 1726
- Born: 2 August 1684; Weissenfels
- Died: 6 May 1752 (aged 67) near Hotzenplotz in Roßwald
- Spouse: George William, Margrave of Brandenburg-Bayreuth; Albert Joseph, Count of Hoditz and Wolframitz
- Issue: Christiane Sophie Wilhelmine
- House: Albertine Wettin
- Father: Johann Adolf I, Duke of Saxe-Weissenfels
- Mother: Johanna Magdalena of Saxe-Altenburg

Sophia of Saxe-Weissenfels (2 August 1684, Weissenfels - 6 May 1752, near Hotzenplotz in Roßwald) was a German aristocrat and culture patron, Margravine of Brandenburg-Bayreuth by marriage to George William, Margrave of Brandenburg-Bayreuth.

== Life ==
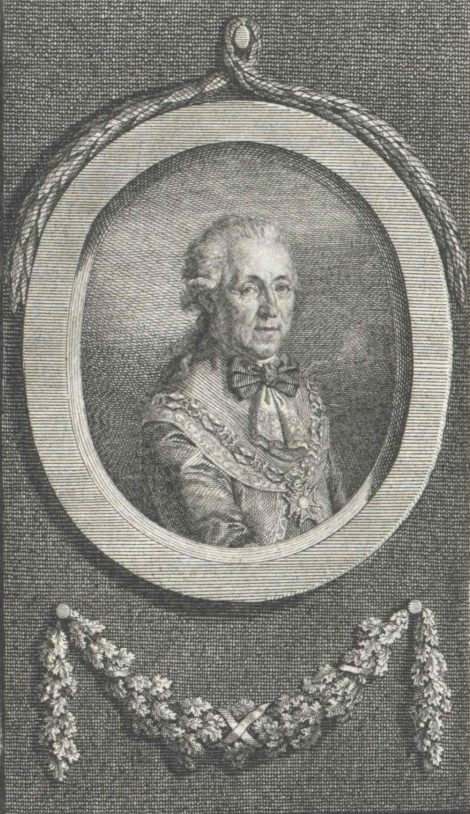
Sophia' second husband: Albert Joseph, Count of Hoditz and Wolframitz (1706-1778)

Sophia was a daughter of Johann Adolf I, Duke of Saxe-Weissenfels (1649-1697) by his first wife, Princess Johanna Magdalena of Saxe-Altenburg (1656-1686), daughter of Frederick William II, Duke of Saxe-Altenburg. This made her a princess of Saxe-Weissenfels and a member of the Albertine branch of the House of Wettin.

In Leipzig on 16 October 1699 Sophia herself married George William, Margrave of Brandenburg-Bayreuth (1678-1726), who she had met during a visit to the Leipzig Fair earlier the same year. She thus became Margravine of Brandenburg-Bayreuth. Soon afterwards he founded his own court, giving him the opportunity to build the Schloss Erlangen.

Sophia had considerable influence on cultural life in Bayreuth, which was described as the finest venue for singspiel in Germany. Sophia brought her love for German-language opera to Weissenfels, making it the only theatre which exclusively showed German-language works. However, her spending on festivities and culture increased the state's debt. In 1705 the foundation stone was laid for a new church in the St. Georgen district of the city - it was dedicated to Hagia Sophia after her. Sophia was described as superficial, and her marriage proved unhappy. Her dalliance with a Swedish baron irritated George William that he attacked the baron at table with a stick and had his wife taken to Plassenburg.

After her husband's death, she moved to Schloss Erlangen, where she lived for 8 years. She remarried on 14 July 1734 to Albert Joseph, Count of Hoditz and Wolframitz (1706-1778), the son of Count Carl Joseph von Hoditz und Wolframitz (1673–1741) and his wife, Eleonore Barbara von Paczensky und Tenczin (1676–1725). He was twenty-two years her junior, making her reichsgräfin (imperial countess) of Hoditz and Wolframitz. To marry him Sophia converted to Catholicism and as a result she was granted an annual pension from the imperial court in Vienna. After her death in 1752 Sophia was cremated - this was the first cremation in a German-speaking country since their occurrence in non-Christian parts of the German Empire in the 13th century. After her death, her second husband remained a widower and never remarried, dying in debt after selling Schloss Rosswald, in Potsdam, Kingdom of Prussia, under the protection of Frederick the Great.

== Issue ==
By her first marriage to George William, she had five children, but only one daughter reached adulthood:

- Christiane Sophie Wilhelmine von Brandenburg-Bayreuth (1701–1749)
- Christian Wilhelm Brandenburg-Bayreuth (*/† 1706)
- Eberhardine Elisabeth von Brandenburg-Bayreuth (1706–1709)
- Christian Friedrich Wilhelm von Brandenburg-Bayreuth (*/† 1709)
- Franz Adolf Wilhelm von Brandenburg-Bayreuth (*/† 1709)

== Bibliography (in German) ==
- Dieter J. Weiss: Barock in Franken, J. H. Röll, Dettelbach 2004, S. 86 f.
- Martin Schieber: Erlangen: eine illustrierte Geschichte der Stadt, Verlag C. H. Beck, München 2002, S. 49
- Johann G. Mayer: Nachrichten von der politischen und ökonomischen Verfassung des Fürstenthums, S. 11 ff.
- E.C. von Hagen (ed.): Archiv für Geschichte und Alterthumskunde von Oberfranken, Volumes 5-6, Bayreuth 1851, S. 4 ff.
- Hans-Joachim Böttcher: Christiane Eberhardine - Prinzessin von Brandenburg-Bayreuth, Kurfürstin von Sachsen und Königin von Polen. Dresdner Buchverlag 2011. ISBN 978-3-941757-25-7.

Sophia of Saxe-Weissenfels, Countess of Brandenburg-Bayreuth House of Hohenzollern Born: 2 August 1684 Died: 6 May 1752
German nobility
Vacant Title last held by Elisabeth Sophie of Brandenburg	Margravine consort of Brandenburg-Bayreuth; 1712 - 1726	Vacant Title next held by Wilhelmine of Prussia
