= Schloss Erlangen =

Coordinates: 49.5979°N 11.0045°E

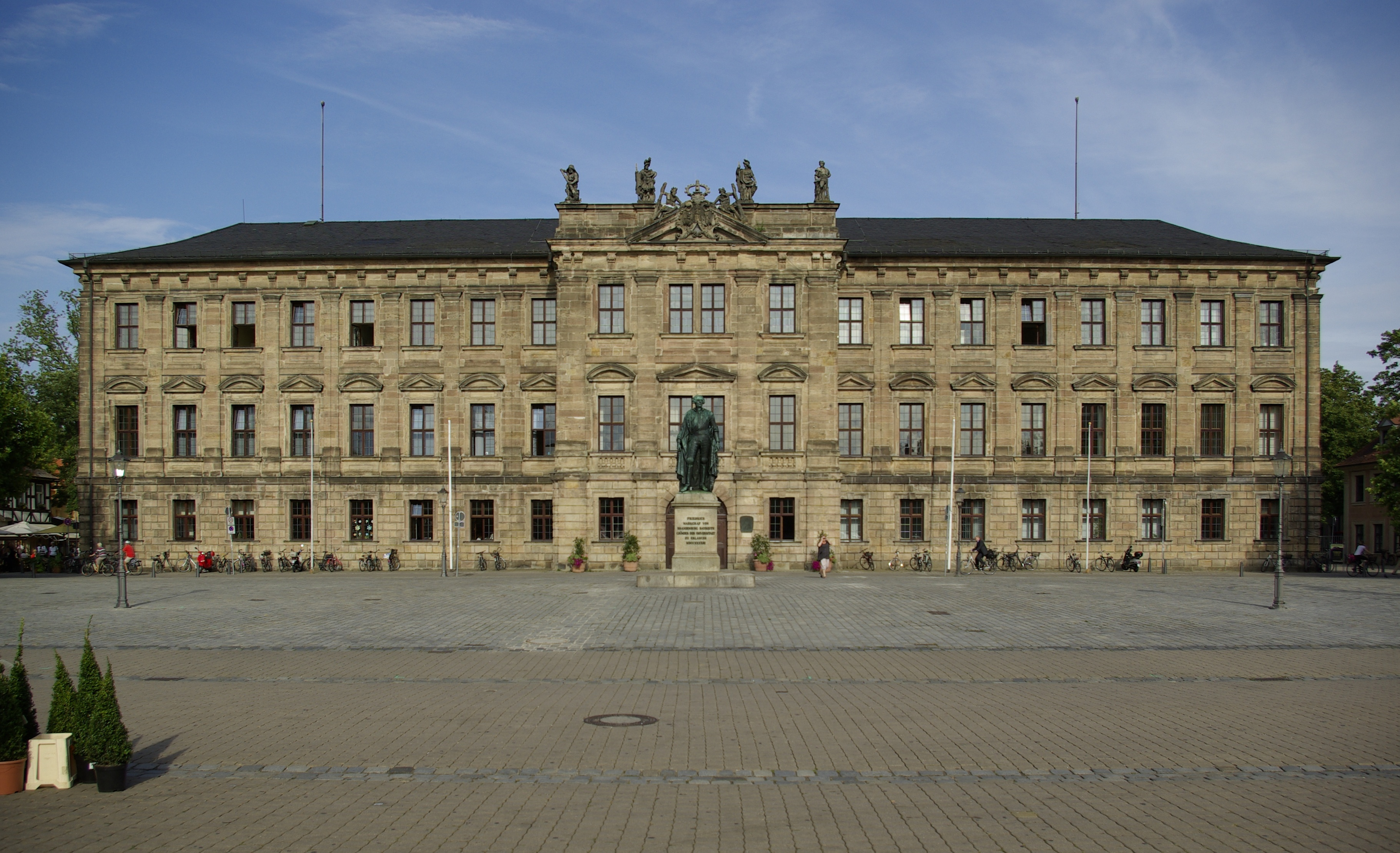
West front of the Schloss

The Schloss Erlangen is a residence in Erlangen, built between 1700 and 1704 by George William, Margrave of Brandenburg-Bayreuth. Work was initially led by Antonio della Porta and after his death in 1702 by Gottfried von Gedeler. It was the first baroque building built from scratch in Franconia.

Christian Ernst moved his third wife Margravine Elisabeth Sophie of Brandenburg into the Schloss in 1703 when it was still incomplete, giving it its initial name, the Elisabethenburg. Behind it was a 280 metre wide and 550 metre long garden with an orangery (completed in 1706), the Konkordienkirche (completed in 1706, now the Geological Institute), the Hugenottenbrunnen fountain, an equestrian statue and a now-lost Sylvan theater.

After a short time as a princely residence, the castle served as a widow's residence until the early 19th century. It suffered several fires in the 18th century and on 14 January 1814 a final serious fire broke out in a roof space filled with rubbish - it could not be extinguished since the temperature was -25 °C and the water froze in the hoses and even once the water had been heated the syringes could not pump it high enough. The castle was completely destroyed and only its furniture was saved.

It was only rebuilt between 1821 and 1825, to plans by the university architect Friedrich Wilhelm Örtel with much flatter roofs than the original structure, and used to house the library of the Friedrich-Alexander-Universität. It was used as a reserve hospital during the First and Second World Wars and after 1945 it has only been used by the university.

== See also ==
- List of Baroque residences

== Bibliography ==
- (in German) Christoph Friederich, Bertold Freiherr von Haller, Andreas Jakob (ed.): Erlanger Stadtlexikon. W. Tümmels Verlag, Nürnberg 2002, ISBN 3-921590-89-2
