= Ordenskirche St. Georgen =

Church building in Bavaria, Germany

Coordinates: 49°57′15″N 11°35′34″E

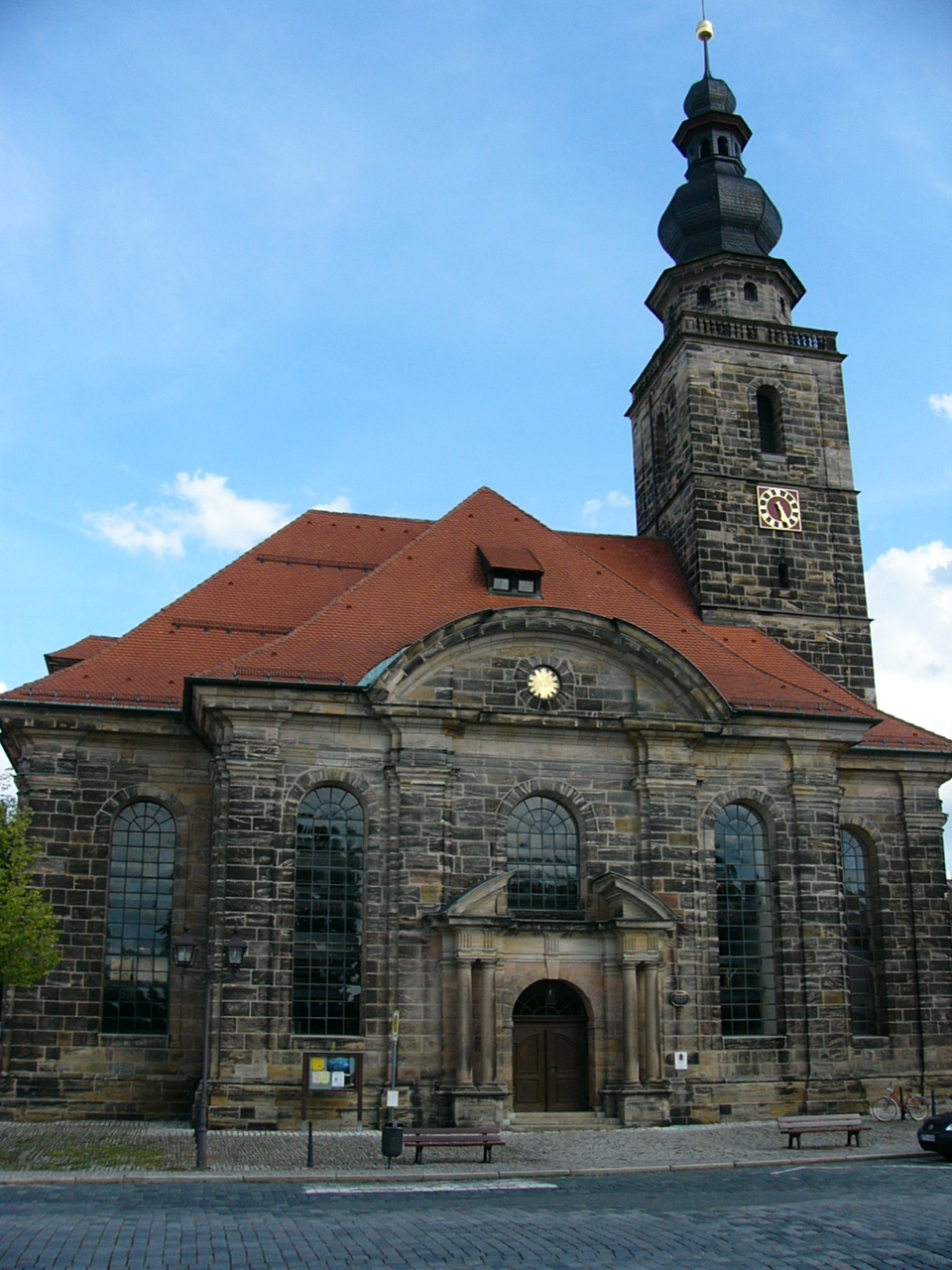
Ordenskirche St. Georgen

The Ordenskirche St. Georgen or Sophienkirche is a church in the Sankt Georgen suburb of Bayreuth, a suburb which had been founded by George William, Margrave of Brandenburg-Bayreuth as hereditary prince of the Principality of Bayreuth. The church's foundation stone was laid in 1705. Stone was supplied from twenty nearby and distant quarries and in 1709 the church's outer shell was completed. As George William had hoped, the church was consecrated on the feast day of his name-saint George, 23 April 1711, though some work had to be carried out after consecration.

Its first name derived from its dedication to Hagia Sophia, referencing the name of George William's wife Sophia. Its second name derives from the fact that it was the church for the Ordre de la Sincérité and its successor the Order of the Red Eagle.
