= Magdalene Sibylle of Saxony =

Duchess of Saxe-Altenburg from 1652 to 1668

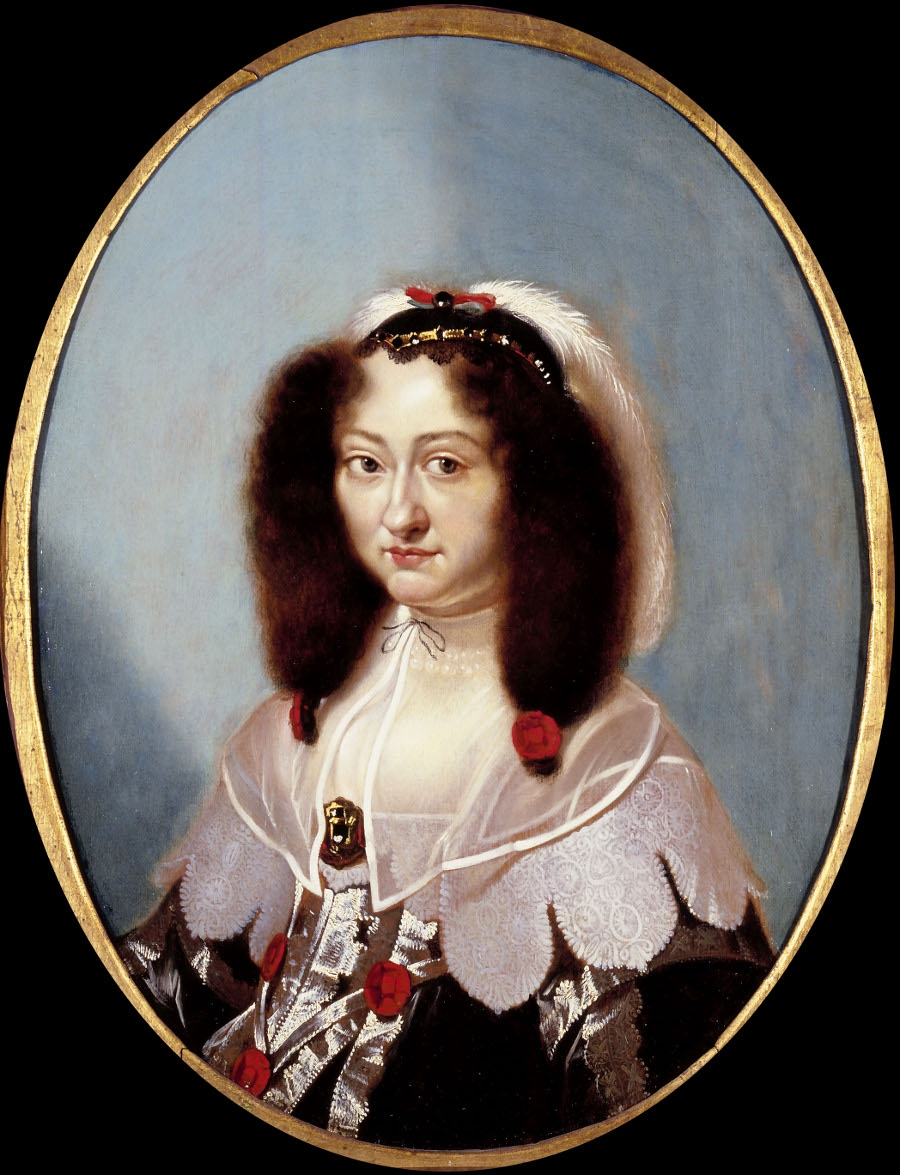
- Portrait by Karel van Mander III, 1642

Duchess consort of Saxe-Altenburg
- Tenure: 11 October 1652 – 6 January 1668
- Born: 23 December 1617; Dresden, Saxony
- Died: 6 January 1668 (aged 50); Altenburg, Thuringia
- Spouse: Christian, Prince-Elect of Denmark (m. 1634; died 1647) Frederick William II, Duke of Saxe-Altenburg (m. 1652)
- Issue: Christian, Hereditary Prince of Saxe-Altenburg; Johanna Magdalena, Duchess of Saxe-Weissenfels; Friedrich Wilhelm III, Duke of Saxe-Altenburg
- House: Wettin
- Father: John George I, Elector of Saxony
- Mother: Magdalene Sibylle of Prussia

Magdalene Sibylle of Saxony (23 December 1617 – 6 January 1668), in Denmark known as Magdalena Sibylla, was the Princess of Denmark and Norway from 1634 to 1647 as the wife of Prince-Elect Christian of Denmark, and the Duchess consort of Saxe-Altenburg as the wife of Frederick Wilhelm II, Duke of Saxe-Altenburg.

== Biography ==
Magdalene Sibylle was born in Dresden, the third surviving daughter and sixth surviving child of John George I, Elector of Saxony, and Magdalene Sibylle of Prussia. Her five elder siblings were Sophia Eleonore, Marie Elisabeth, Johann Georg, August, and Christian; her only younger sibling was Maurice.

She was engaged in 1633 and married on 5 October 1634 to Christian of Denmark-Norway, who had been elected Prince of Denmark (heir apparentin 1610. Denmark being an elective rather than an hereditary monarchy), whilst Norway was a hereditary monarchy, making Christian Crown Prince since his birth. The wedding took place on 5 October 1634 in Copenhagen with grand festivities. Known in Denmark as Det store bilager ("The great wedding"), the wedding exemplified the great pomp and luxury of the Baroque era. The first ballet ever produced in Denmark was performed for the occasion.

The couple resided at Nykøbing Castle in Falster. Magdalene Sibylle lived discreetly as princess. She made donations to churches and clergymen, and received praise for doing so. She also wrote a prayerbook. Her husband died during a trip to Saxony, which she was accompanying him on, and the marriage ended childless. Eventually her brother-in-law ascended the throne as Frederick III.

When she became a widow, in 1647, she was granted Lolland-Falster as her fief and the position of royal sheriff of Nykøbing county with the two shires of Falster and the county of Ålholm. She had specifically asked for these fiefs. She withdrew to her dower estates in the south of Denmark.

In 1651 she was engaged to Duke Frederick Wilhelm II of Saxe-Altenburg, and on 11 October 1652, she married him in Dresden. The next year, 1653, she lost her lands and offices in Denmark.

She had three children with her second husband:

1. Christian (Altenburg, 27 February 1654 – Altenburg, 5 June 1663)
2. Johanna Magdalena (Altenburg, 14 January 1656 – Weissenfels, 22 January 1686), married on 25 October 1671 to Johann Adolf I, Duke of Saxe-Weissenfels.
3. Frederick William (Altenburg, 12 July 1657 – Altenburg, 14 April 1672), Duke of Saxe-Altenburg

She visited Denmark in 1662 for the engagement of Princess Anne Sophie of Denmark to John George III, Elector of Saxony. Upon her death, she was said to have been a loyal Dane until the day she died, 6 January 1668. She died in Altenburg.

Magdalene Sibylle of Saxony House of Wettin Born: 23 December 1617 Died: 6 January 1668
German royalty
Vacant Title last held by Sofie Elisabeth of Brandenburg	Duchess consort of Saxe-Altenburg; 1652–1668	Succeeded by Princess Elisabeth Sophie of Saxe-Altenburg
