= Friedrich Wilhelm III of Saxe-Altenburg =

Friedrich Wilhelm III
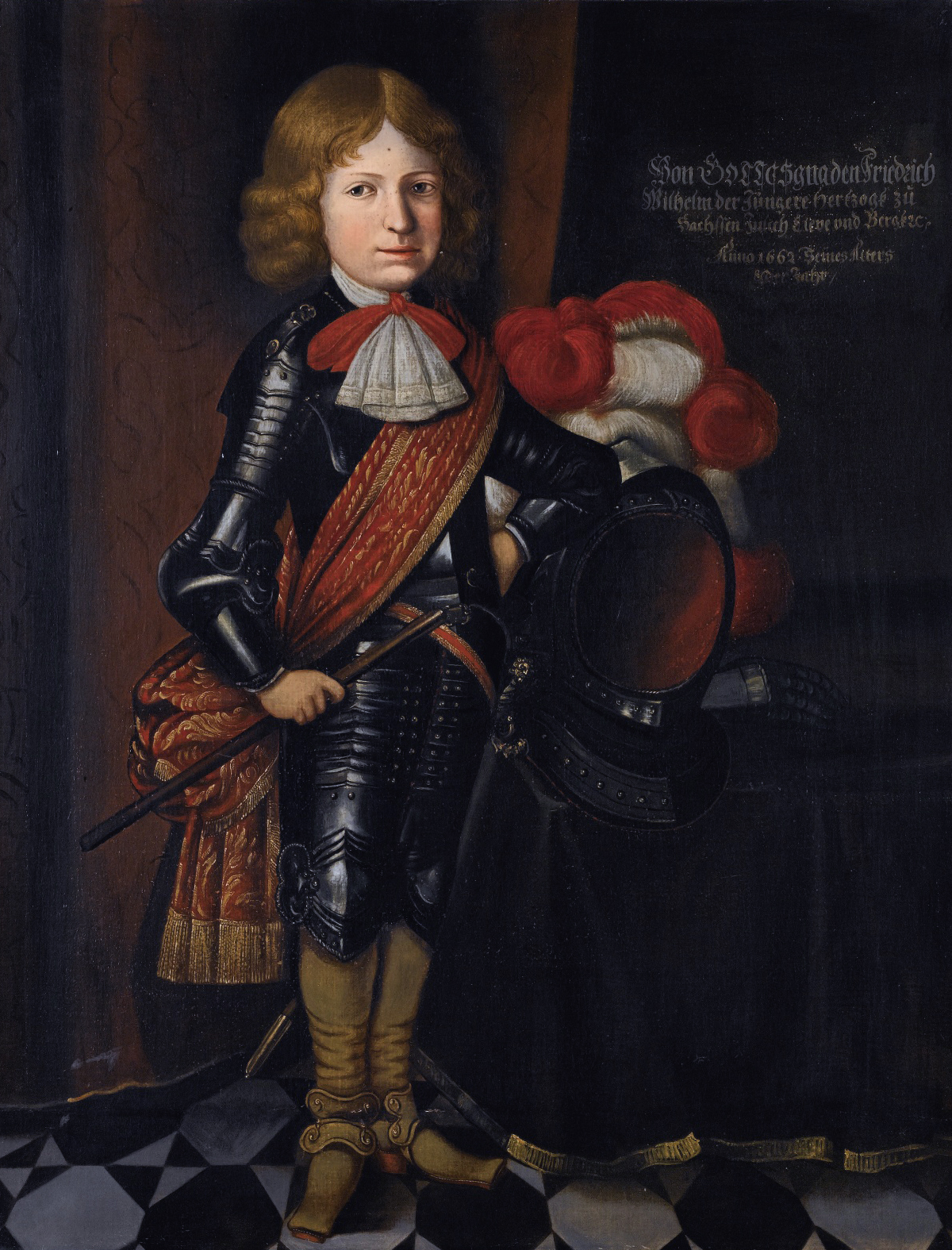
- 1662 portrait

Duke of Saxe-Altenburg
- Reign: 1669–1672
- Predecessor: Friedrich Wilhelm II
- Successor: Ernst I
- Born: 12 July 1657; Altenburg
- Died: 14 April 1672 (aged 14); Altenburg
- House: House of Saxe-Altenburg
- Father: Friedrich Wilhelm II, Duke of Saxe-Altenburg
- Mother: Magdalene Sibylle of Saxony
- Religion: Lutheran

Friedrich Wilhelm III (12 July 1657 – 14 April 1672) was a duke of Saxe-Altenburg.

He was the second son of Friedrich Wilhelm II, Duke of Saxe-Altenburg and his second wife, Magdalene Sybille of Saxony.

== Life ==
The death of his older brother Christian in 1663 made him the new heir of the Duchy of Saxe-Altenburg. When his father died in 1669, Friedrich Wilhelm III succeeded him, but, because he was only twelve years old, his maternal uncles, Elector Johann Georg II of Saxony and Duke Maurice of Saxe-Zeitz, assumed the guardianship of the new duke and the regency of the duchy.

Only three years later, the young duke died of smallpox shortly after returning from a trip to Dresden. His burial took place three months later, on 17 July 1672 at his father's tomb in the church of Schloss Altenburg. With his death, the branch of Saxe-Altenburg, founded in 1603, became extinct in the direct male line.

Saxe-Altenburg was split between the branches of Saxe-Gotha and Saxe-Weimar; but, on the basis of the will of the Duke Johann Philipp of Saxe-Altenburg (Friedrich Wilhelm III's uncle) the greater part of the duchy was retained by Saxe-Gotha, because they were the descendants of Elisabeth Sophie, the only daughter of Johann Philipp, who declared her the general heiress of the family in case of the extinction of the male line.

== Ancestors ==
Ancestors of Friedrich Wilhelm III of Saxe-Altenburg

8. Johann Willhelm, Duke of Saxe-Weimar
4. Friedrich Wilhelm I, Duke of Saxe-Weimar
9. Dorothea Susanne of Simmern
2. Friedrich Wilhelm II, Duke of Saxe-Altenburg
10. Philipp Ludwig, Count Palatine of Neuburg
5. Countess Palatine Anna Maria of Neuburg
11. Anna of Cleves
1. Friedrich Wilhelm III, Duke of Saxe-Altenburg
12. Christian I, Elector of Saxony
6. Johann Georg I, Elector of Saxony
13. Sophie of Brandenburg
3. Magdalene Sibylle of Saxony
14. Albert Frederick, Duke of Prussia
7. Duchess Magdalene Sibylle of Prussia
15. Marie Eleonore of Cleves

Friedrich Wilhelm III of Saxe-Altenburg House of Wettin Born: 12 July 1657 Died: 14 April 1672
| Preceded by Friedrich Wilhelm II | Duke of Saxe-Altenburg; 1669–1672 | Succeeded by Ernst I |
