= Sophie Elisabeth of Brandenburg =

German duchess (1616-1650)

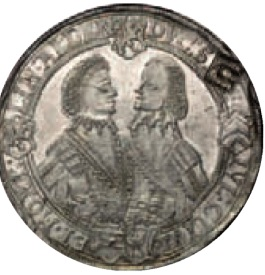
- Born: 1 February 1616; Moritzburg in Halle
- Died: 16 March 1650 (aged 34); Altenburg Castle
- Burial: Brother Church in Altenburg
- Spouse: Frederick William II, Duke of Saxe-Altenburg (m. 1638)
Names
- Sophie Elisabeth of Brandenburg
- House: House of Hohenzollern
- Father: Christian William of Brandenburg
- Mother: Dorothea of Brunswick-Wolfenbüttel

Sophie Elisabeth of Brandenburg (1 February 1616 at Moritzburg Castle in Halle – 16 March 1650 at Altenburg Castle) was a Princess of Brandenburg by birth and by marriage Duchess of Saxe-Altenburg.

== Life ==
Sophie Elizabeth was the only child of Margrave Christian William of Brandenburg (1587-1665) from his first marriage with Dorothea (1596-1643), the daughter of the Duke Henry Julius of Brunswick-Wolfenbüttel. The princess was born at Moritzburg Castle in Halle, where her father resided as administrator of the Archbishopric of Magdeburg.

She married on 18 September 1638 in Altenburg to Duke Frederick William II of Saxe-Altenburg (1603-1669). The marriage was described as a happy one; however, it remained childless. She financially supported the construction of the Friedhof Church in Altenburg.

Sophie Elisabeth died 16 March 1650 and was buried in the ducal crypt in the Brother Church in Altenburg.
