= Christian William of Brandenburg =

German noble

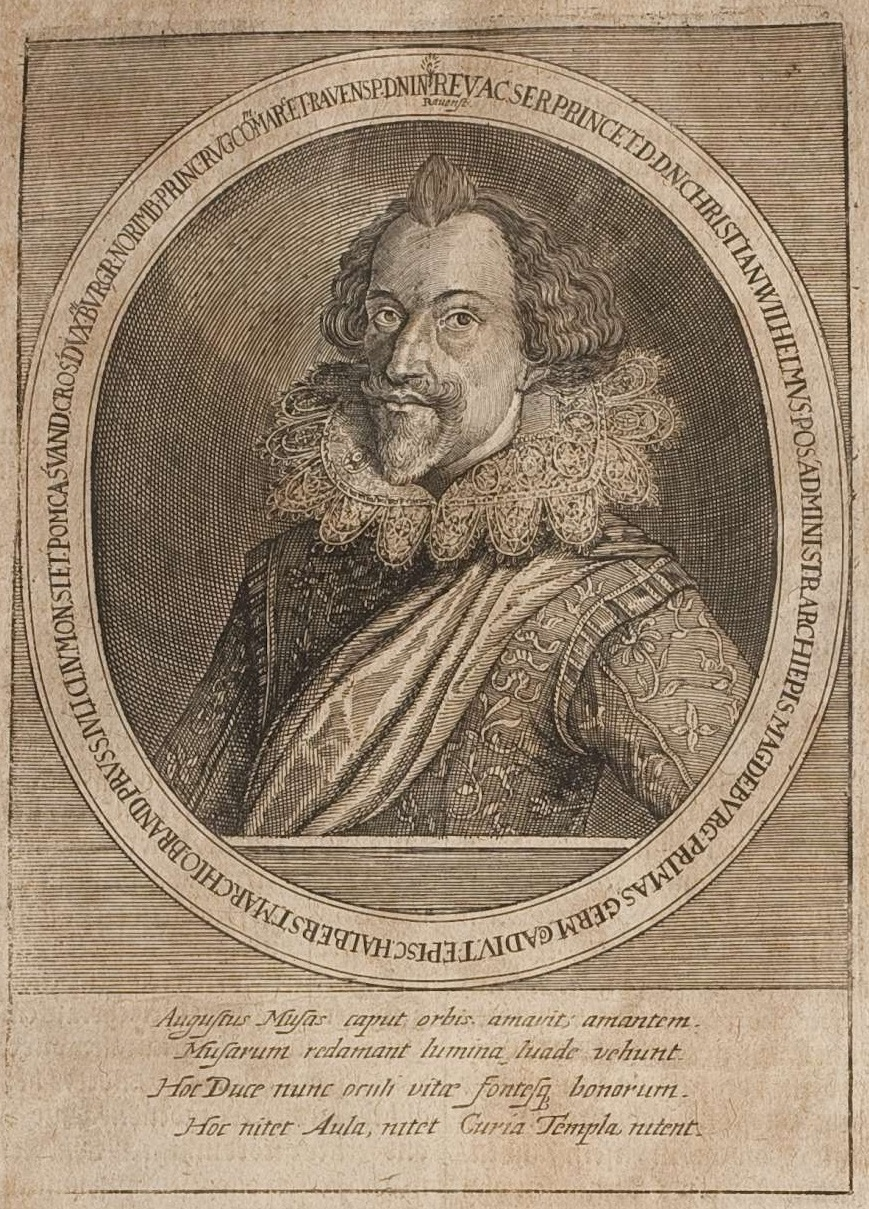
- Born: 28 August 1587; Wolmirstedt, Archbishopric of Magdeburg, Holy Roman Empire
- Died: 1 January 1665 (aged 77); Zinna Abbey, Duchy of Magdeburg, Holy Roman Empire
- Spouse: Dorothea of Brunswick-Wolfenbüttel; Barbara Eusebia of Martinice; Maximiliane Salm-Neuburg
- Issue: Sophie Elisabeth
- House: House of Hohenzollern
- Father: Joachim Frederick, Elector of Brandenburg
- Mother: Catherine of Brandenburg-Küstrin

Christian Wilhelm of Brandenburg (28 August 1587 – 1 January 1665) was a titular Margrave of Brandenburg, and from 1598 to 1631 Archbishop of Magdeburg.

== Life ==
Christian Wilhelm was a son of Elector Joachim Frederick of Brandenburg (1546-1608) from his first marriage with Catherine (1549-1602), a daughter of Margrave John of Brandenburg-Küstrin (1513-1571). He was elected as Archbishop of Magdeburg in 1598. However, the city of Magdeburg did not recognize him as Prince-Bishop, because his election had not been confirmed by the emperor. When he married in 1614, he assumed the title of Lutheran administrator only. That same year, he also became coadjutor of Halberstadt. In 1624, he became administrator of Halberstadt. During the Thirty Years' War, he entered into an alliance with Denmark. In 1626, he led an army from Lower Saxony into the Battle of Dessau Bridge. After Wallenstein won this battle, he fled abroad. In 1629, he fled to the court of King Gustavus Adolphus of Sweden.

In 1630, he returned to Germany. The cathedral chapter of Magdeburg formally deposed him in 1631. Sweden promised to assist him when he attempted to reconquer his Archbishopric. Nevertheless, the reconquest failed and he was badly injured during the siege of Magdeburg in 1631. He was taken up in the army camp Pappenheim, where his wounds were tended and Jesuits persuaded him to convert to Catholicism. A pamphlet with the title Speculum veritatis was published in his name, and he was released. Under the Peace of Prague of 1635, he received an annual sum of 12000 taler from the revenues of the archbishopric of Magdeburg, plus the districts Loburg and Zinna. In 1651, he purchased the Nový Hrad estate in Bohemia. He died at Zinna Abbey in 1665.

== Personal life ==
Christian William married three times.

His first wedding took place on 1 January 1615 in Wolfenbüttel, where he married Dorothea (1596-1643), a daughter of the Duke Henry Julius of Brunswick-Wolfenbüttel. From this marriage, he had a daughter, Sophie Elisabeth (1616-1650), married in 1638 to Duke Frederick William II of Saxe-Altenburg (1603-1669). On 22 February 1650 in Prague, he married Barbara Eusebia (d. 1656), a daughter of Count Jaroslav Borzita of Martinice and his first wife, Maria Eusebie von Sternberg. On 28 May 1657, he married, again in Prague, to Countess Maximiliane (1608-1663), daughter of Count Weichard of Salm-Neuburg and Sidonia von Minckwitz.

== Death ==
He died at Zinna Abbey, Duchy of Magdeburg, in 1665.

Christian William of Brandenburg House of Hohenzollern Born: 28 August 1587 Died: 1 January 1665
Preceded by Joachim Frederick	Archbishop and later Administrator of Magdeburg; 1598-1631	Succeeded by Leopold William of Austria
Preceded by Christian of Brunswick-Lüneburg	Administrator of Halberstadt; 1625-1628	Succeeded by Leopold William of Austria
