= Gottfried von Gedeler =

German Baroque architect and engineer

Gottfried von Gedeler (before 1660 – after 1718) was a German Baroque architect and engineer.

From 1693, Gedeler was technical advisor for the further construction of St. John's Church in Dessau. Between 1694 and 1703, he was active as an electoral Brandenburg engineer and city architect in Halle, although some attributions must be limited to circumstantial evidence due to a lack of source documents. For example, it is assumed that he was involved in the baroque south wing of the Old Town Hall. Evidence exists of Gedeler's involvement in the main building of the Francke Foundations.
