= Sophie Luise of Württemberg =

Margravine of Brandenburg-Bayreuth (1642–1702)

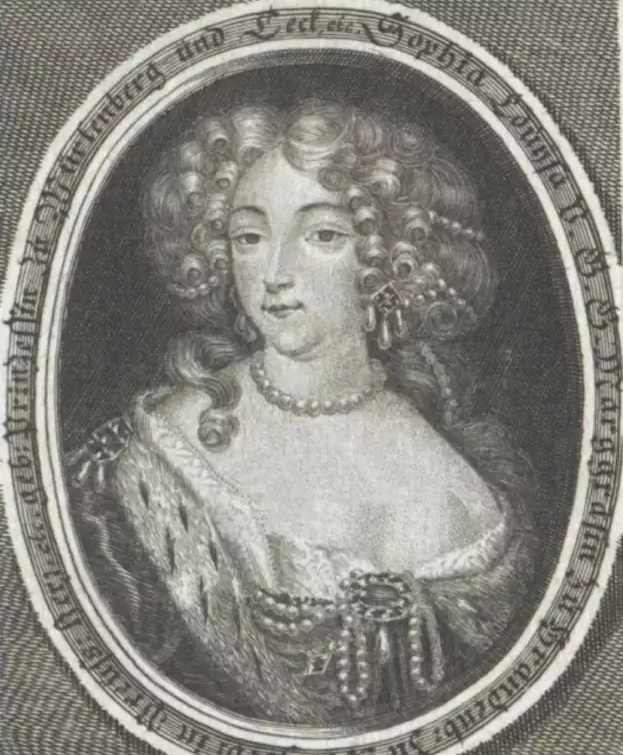
- Born: 19 February 1642; Stuttgart
- Died: 3 October 1702 (aged 60); Bayreuth
- Spouse: Christian Ernst, Margrave of Brandenburg-Bayreuth (m. 1671)
- Issue Detail: Christiane Eberhardine, Queen of Poland and Electress of Saxony; George William, Margrave of Brandenburg-Bayreuth
- House: House of Württemberg
- Father: Eberhard III, Duke of Württemberg
- Mother: Anna Catharina of Salm-Kyrburg

Sophie Luise of Württemberg (19 February 1642 – 3 October 1702) was a Margravine of Brandeburg-Bayreuth as the wife of Christian Ernst, Margrave of Brandenburg-Bayreuth.

== Early life ==
Sophie Louise was Princess of Württemberg by birth, being the fifth child and eldest daughter of Eberhard III, Duke of Württemberg and Wild- und Rheingräfin Anna Catharina of Salm-Kyrburg (1614–1655).

== Marriage and issue ==
Sophie Louise married Christian Ernst, Margrave of Brandenburg-Bayreuth (6 August 1644 - 20 May 1712), who had lost his first wife Erdmuthe Sophie of Saxony the year before. The marriage was celebrated in Stuttgart on 8 February 1671.

Sophie Louise and Christian Ernst had six children of which only three survived infancy:

- Christiane Eberhardine (29 December 1671, Bayreuth – 5 September 1727, Pretzsch)
- Elenore Magdalene (24 January 1673, Bayreuth – 13 December 1711, Ettlingen)
- Klaudia Eleonore Sofie (4 July 1675, Bayreuth – 11 February 1676, Bayreuth)
- Charlotte Emilie (4 June 1677, Bayreuth – 15 February 1678, Bayreuth)
- Georg Wilhelm (26 November 1678, Bayreuth – 18 December 1726, Bayreuth)
- Karl Ludwig (21 November 1679, Bayreuth – 7 April 1680, Bayreuth)

Of their surviving children, George William became margrave on the death of his father in 1712, while Christiane Eberhardine married Frederick Augustus, Duke of Saxony, a future King of Poland, in 1693.

== Death ==
Sophie Louise died on 3 October 1702 and was buried in Bayreuth. Her husband remarried the following year to Elisabeth Sophie of Brandenburg, but he had no further children.
