= Ordre de la Sincérité =

Awarded by George William of Brandenburg-Bayreuth
- Type: Chivalric order in one class
- Established: November 17, 1705
- Status: Disestablished
- Grades: Knight
- Ribbon of the order

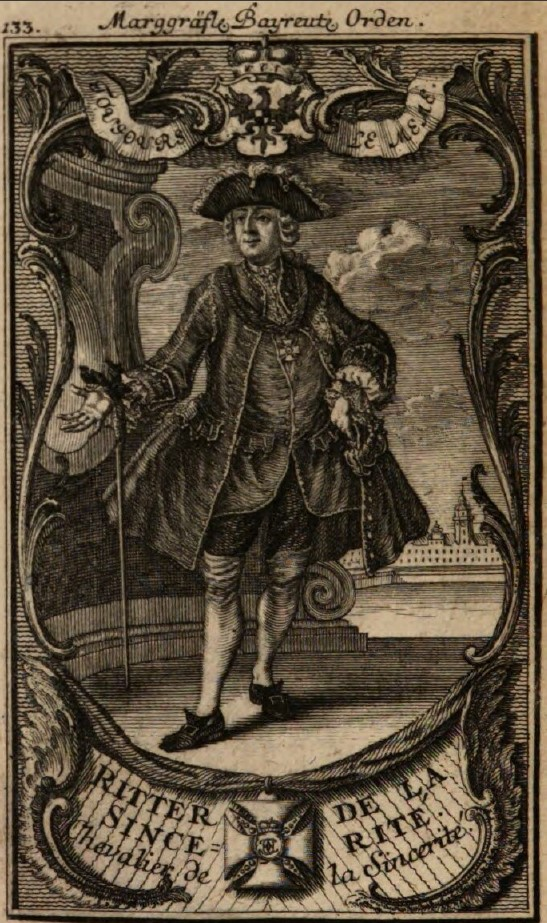

The Ordre de la Sincérité (English: Order of Sincerity), was an order of knighthood of the German Margrave of Bayreuth. The order's name came from 18th-century courtiers who spoke French. The order had fifty knights. It was later renamed the Order of the Brandenburg Red Eagle and later as the Order of the Red Eagle.

== History ==
The Ordre de la Sincérité was founded on November 17, 1705, by the ruling Margrave George William of Brandenburg-Bayreuth, a member of the House of Hohenzollern. As it was often the case with the orders of knighthood of the small German courts it soon fell into disuse. However, was revived in 1712 in Brandenburg-Bayreuth and again in 1734 in Brandenburg-Ansbach, where it was renamed "Order of the Brandenburg Red Eagle". The statutes were changed in 1777 and the order named therein as the "Order of the Red Eagle". The order was conferred in one class, limited to fifty knights. The church of the order was the Ordenskirche St. Georgen in Bayreuth.

In January 1792, the Kingdom of Prussia bought both Brandenburg-Bayreuth and Brandenburg-Ansbach and on June 12, 1792, King Frederick William II again revived the order as a Prussian royal order. After the Order of the Black Eagle, the Order of the Red Eagle was the second highest order of the kingdom in order of precedence. In 1918, it was finally abolished as a state order, but continues as a House Order of the House of Hohenzollern.

== Sources ==
- Maximilian Gritzner, Handbuch der Ritter- und Verdienstorden aller Kulturstaaten der Welt innerhalb des XIX. Jahrhunderts. Auf Grund amtlicher und anderer zuverlässiger Quellen zusammengestellt. Verlag:Leipzig., Verlagsbuchhandlung von J.J.Weber, 1893.
