= Friedrich Wilhelm II of Saxe-Altenburg =

Friedrich Wilhelm II
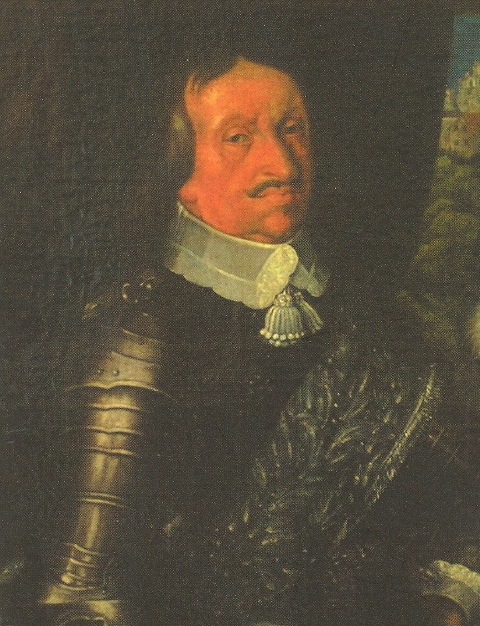
- 17th century portrait

Duke of Saxe-Altenburg
- Reign: 1639–1669
- Predecessor: Johann Philipp
- Successor: Friedrich Wilhelm III
- Born: 12 February 1603; Weimar
- Died: 22 April 1669 (aged 66); Altenburg
- Spouse: Sophie Elisabeth of Brandenburg (m. 1638; died 1650) Magdalene Sibylle of Saxony (m. 1652; died 1668)
- Issue: Christian, Hereditary Prince of Saxe-Altenburg; Johanna Magdalena, Duchess of Saxe-Weissenfels; Friedrich Wilhelm III, Duke of Saxe-Altenburg
- House: House of Wettin
- Father: Friedrich Wilhelm I, Duke of Saxe-Weimar
- Mother: Anna Maria of the Palatinate-Neuburg
- Religion: Lutheran

Friedrich Wilhelm II (12 February 1603, in Weimar – 22 April 1669, in Altenburg), was a duke of Saxe-Altenburg.

He was the youngest son of Friedrich Wilhelm I, Duke of Saxe-Weimar, and Anna Maria of the Palatinate-Neuburg, his second wife. He was born eight months after the death of his father, on 7 July 1602.

Shortly after his birth, Friedrich Wilhelm II and his older brothers inherited Saxe-Altenburg as co-rulers under the guardianship of the Electors of Saxony Christian II and John George I until 1618, when his older brother John Philip assumed the government of the duchy and the guardianship of his younger siblings.

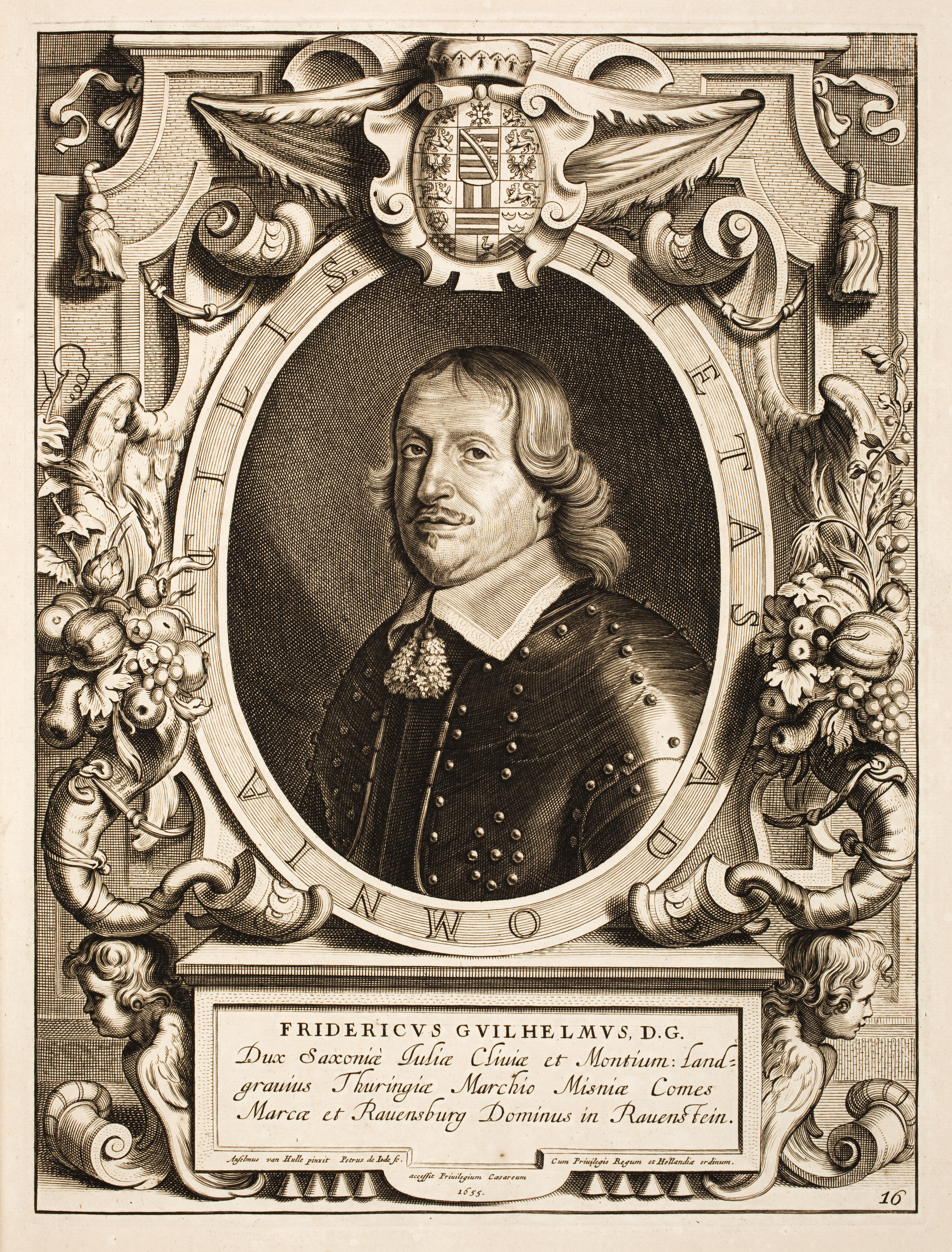
Engraving of Friedrich Wilhelm II

By 1632, two of his three brothers were deceased. Friedrich Wilhelm II and his older brother John Philip began a joint government; but, in fact, John Philip was the real and only ruler of the duchy of Saxe-Altenburg. Friedrich Wilhelm II was only a nominal ruler until the death of John Philip (1639), when he began his personal reign over Altenburg.

At Altenburg Castle on 18 September 1638 Friedrich Wilhelm II married his first wife, Sophie Elisabeth, the only daughter of Christian William of Brandenburg. She died in 1650 after twelve years of childless marriage.

In Dresden on 11 October 1652 Friedrich Wilhelm II married secondly Magdalene Sibylle of Saxony, Dowager Crown Princess of Denmark and daughter of his former regent, the Elector John George I. They had three children:

1. Christian (b. Altenburg, 27 February 1654 – d. Altenburg, 5 June 1663).
2. Johanna Magdalena (b. Altenburg, 14 January 1656 – d. Weissenfels, 22 January 1686), married on 25 October 1671 to Johann Adolf I, Duke of Saxe-Weissenfels.
3. Friedrich Wilhelm III, Duke of Saxe-Altenburg (b. Altenburg, 12 July 1657 – d. Altenburg, 14 April 1672).

In 1660 he acquired the towns of Themar and Meiningen. In 1664 he built a hunting seat (Jagdschloss) in Hummelshain, and, in 1665, he built a particularly beautiful widow seat (Witwensitz) called "Magdalenenstift" in Altenburg for his wife Magdalene Sybille.

After his death he was succeeded by his second and only surviving son, Frederick William III.

== Ancestry ==
Ancestors of Friedrich Wilhelm II of Saxe-Altenburg

8. Johann Friedrich I, Elector of Saxony
4. Johann Wilhelm, Duke of Saxe-Weimar
9. Sibylle of Cleves
2. Friedrich Wilhelm I, Duke of Saxe-Weimar
10. Frederick III, Elector Palatine
5. Dorothea Susanne of Simmern
11. Marie of Brandenburg-Kulmbach
1. Friedrich Wilhelm II, Duke of Saxe-Altenburg
12. Wolfgang, Count Palatine of Zweibrücken
6. Philipp Ludwig, Count Palatine of Neuburg
13. Anna of Hesse
3. Anna Maria of the Palatinate-Neuburg
14. Wilhelm, Duke of Jülich-Cleves-Berg
7. Anna of Cleves
15. Maria of Habsburg, Archduchess of Austria

Friedrich Wilhelm II of Saxe-Altenburg House of Wettin Born: 12 February 1603 Died: 22 April 1669
Preceded by Johann Philipp	Duke of Saxe-Altenburg; 1639–1669	Succeeded by Friedrich Wilhelm III
