= John George I of Saxony =

Elector of Saxony from 1611 to 1656

John George I
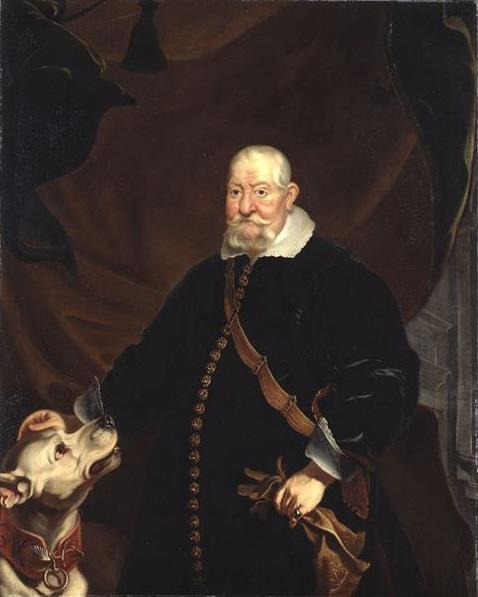
- Portrait by Frans Luycx, 1652

Elector of Saxony
- Reign: 23 June 1611 – 8 October 1656
- Predecessor: Christian II
- Successor: John George II
- Born: 5 March 1585; Dresden, Electorate of Saxony, Holy Roman Empire
- Died: 8 October 1656 (aged 71); Dresden, Electorate of Saxony, Holy Roman Empire
- Burial: Freiberg Cathedral
- Spouse: Sibylle Elisabeth of Württemberg (m. 1604; died 1606) Magdalene Sibylle of Prussia (m. 1607)
- Issue Detail: Sophie Eleonore, Landgravine of Hesse-Darmstadt; Marie Elisabeth, Duchess of Holstein-Gottorp; John George II, Elector of Saxony; Augustus, Duke of Saxe-Weissenfels; Christian I, Duke of Saxe-Merseburg; Magdalene Sibylle, Duchess of Saxe-Altenburg; Maurice, Duke of Saxe-Zeitz
- House: Wettin (Albertine Line)
- Father: Christian I, Elector of Saxony
- Mother: Sophie of Brandenburg
- Religion: Lutheran

John George I, (Jan Georg I. in German; 5 March 1585 – 8 October 1656) was Elector of Saxony from 1611 to 1656. He led Saxony through the Thirty Years' War, which dominated his 45-year reign.

== Biography ==
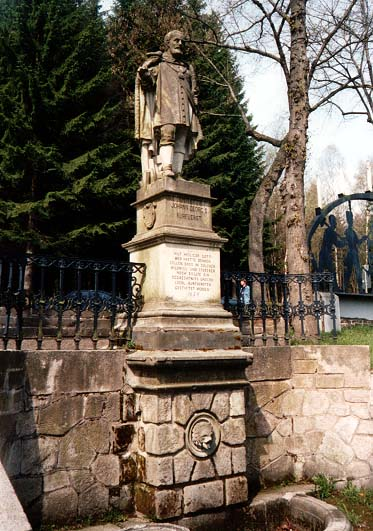
Monument to John George in Johanngeorgenstadt

Born in Dresden, John George was the second son of the Elector Christian I and Sophie of Brandenburg. He belonged to the Albertine line of the House of Wettin. To master statecraft, law, and history, he and his brothers were formally matriculated at Leipzig University. He retained close structural ties to the university throughout his reign, frequently employing its prominent medical and legal professors as personal court advisors and state physicians. John George succeeded to the electorate on 23 June 1611 on the death of his elder brother, Christian II. The geographical position of the Electorate of Saxony rather than her high standing among the German Protestants gave her ruler much importance during the Thirty Years' War. At the beginning of his reign, however, the new elector took up a somewhat detached position. His personal allegiance to Lutheranism was sound, but he liked neither the growing strength of Brandenburg-Prussia nor the increasing prestige of the Palatinate; the adherence of the other branches of the Saxon ruling house to Protestantism seemed to him to suggest that the head of the Electorate of Saxony should throw his weight into the other scale, and he was prepared to favour the advances of the Habsburgs and the Roman Catholic party.

Thus John George was easily induced to vote for the election of Archduke Ferdinand of Styria, as emperor in August 1619, an action which nullified the anticipated opposition of the Protestant electors. The new emperor secured the help of John George for the impending campaign in Bohemia by promising that he should be undisturbed in his possession of certain ecclesiastical lands. Carrying out his share of the bargain by occupying Silesia and Lusatia, where he displayed much clemency, the Saxon elector had thus some part in driving Frederick V, Elector Palatine of the Rhine, from Bohemia and in crushing Protestantism in that country, the crown of which he himself had previously refused. Gradually, however, he was made uneasy by the obvious trend of the imperial policy towards the annihilation of Protestantism, and by a dread lest the ecclesiastical lands should be taken from him; and the issue of the Edict of Restitution in March 1629 put the capstone to his fears. Still, although clamouring vainly for the exemption of the electorate from the area covered by the Edict, John George took no decisive measures to break his alliance with the emperor. He did, indeed, in February 1631 call a meeting of Protestant princes at Leipzig, but in spite of the appeals of the preacher Matthias Hoe von Hohenegg (1580–1645) he contented himself with a formal protest.

Meanwhile, Gustavus Adolphus had landed in Germany, aiming to relieve Magdeburg. Gustavus attempted to conclude an alliance with John George to allow him to cross the Elbe at Wittenberg, but John George remained hesitant to join the Protestant cause and the discussions went nowhere. Hoping that an alliance would be concluded eventually, Gustavus avoided any military action.

Tilly, commander of the main imperial force, was also concerned about the possibility of an alliance, no matter how unlikely it was at the time. In order to preempt any such move, he invaded Saxony and started to ravage the countryside. This had the effect of driving John George into the alliance he had hoped to preempt, which was concluded in September 1631. The Saxon troops were present at the Battle of Breitenfeld, but were routed by the Imperials under Tilly, the elector himself seeking safety in flight.

Nevertheless, he soon took the offensive after Gustavus crushed the army of Tilly. Marching into Bohemia the Saxons occupied Prague, but John George soon began to negotiate for peace and consequently his soldiers offered little resistance to Wallenstein, who drove them back into Saxony. However, for the present the efforts of Gustavus Adolphus prevented the elector from deserting him, but the position was changed by the death of the king at Lützen in 1632, and the refusal of Saxony to join the Protestant league under Swedish leadership.

Still letting his troops fight in a desultory fashion against the imperials, John George again negotiated for peace, and in May 1635 he concluded the important Treaty of Prague with Ferdinand II. His reward was Lusatia and certain other additions of territory; the retention by his son Augustus of the Archbishopric of Magdeburg; and some concessions with regard to the Edict of Restitution. Almost at once he declared war upon the Swedes, but in October 1636 he was beaten at Wittstock; and Saxony, ravaged impartially by both sides, was soon in a deplorable condition. At length in September 1645 the elector was compelled to agree to a truce with the Swedes, who, however, retained Leipzig; and as far as Saxony was concerned this ended the Thirty Years' War. After the Peace of Westphalia, which with regard to Saxony did little more than confirm the treaty of Prague, John George died on 8 October 1656.

He was called "Öl Göran" ("Beer Göran" in Swedish) by Swedish soldiers in the Thirty Years' War because of his excessive drinking and eating.

== Assessment ==
Although not without political acumen, John George was not a great ruler; his character appears to have been harsh and unlovely, and he was addicted to drink and other diversions such as hunting. Wallenstein held him in contempt saying on more than one occasion "have you seen how he lives".

== Gallery ==
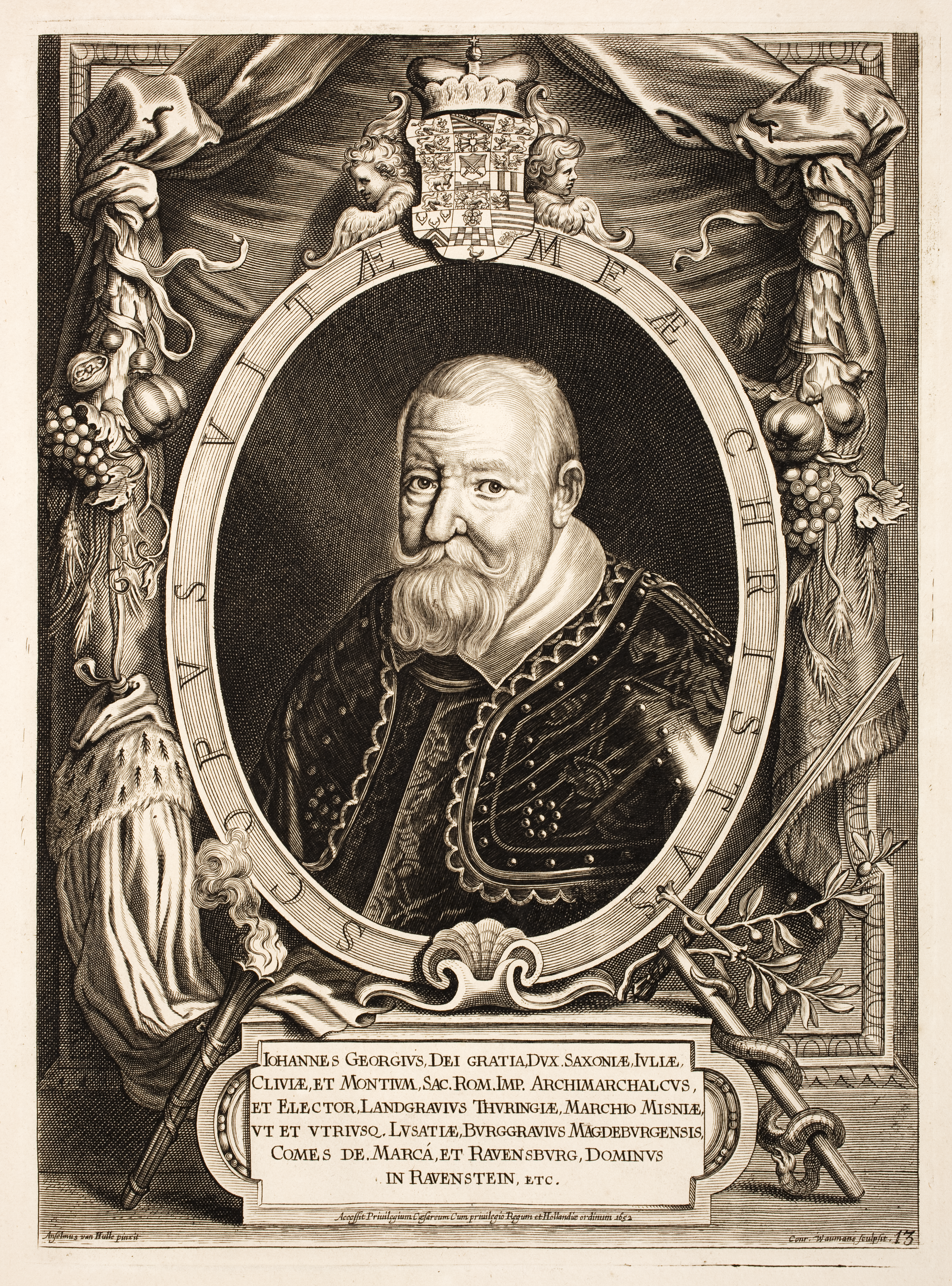
Engraving of John George I, Elector of Saxony. Anselm van Hulle

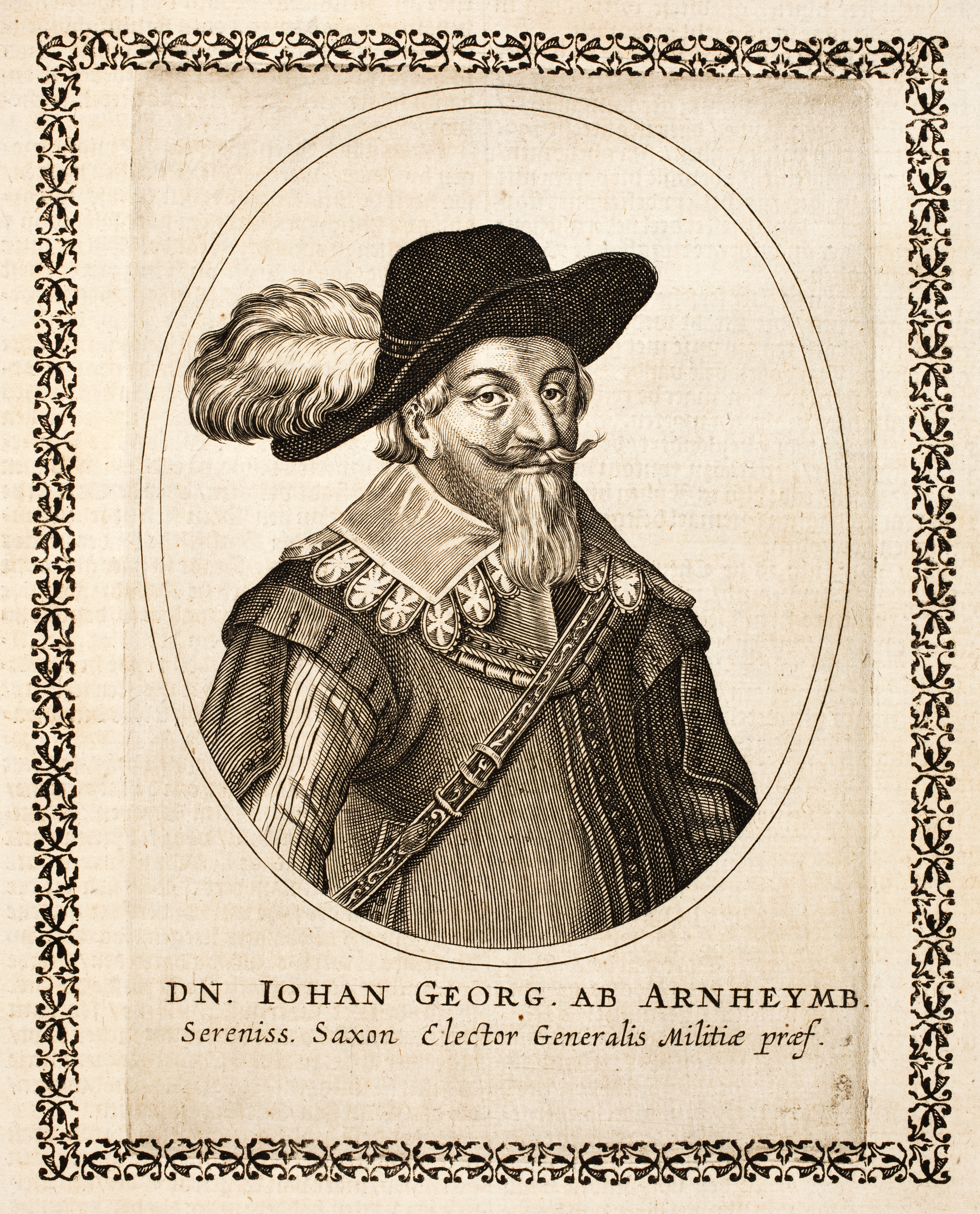
Engraving, Cornelis Danckaerts Historis, 1642

Johann Georg I of Saxony, 1613

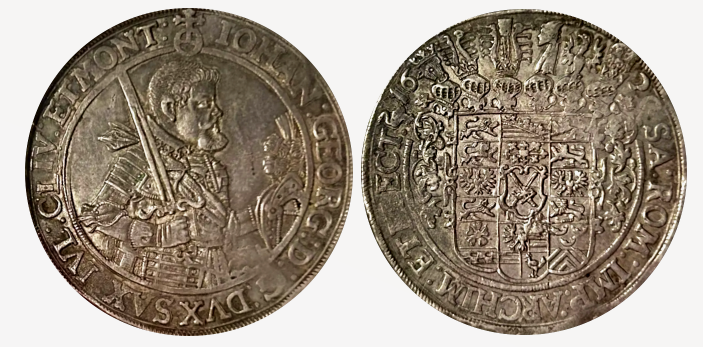
1620 Taler - John George I

== Family and children ==
John George was married twice. In addition to his successor John George II, he left three sons, Augustus (1614–1680), Christian (died 1691) and Maurice (died 1681).

In Dresden on 16 September 1604 Johann Georg married firstly Sibylle Elisabeth, daughter of Frederick I, Duke of Württemberg. She died in the birth of their only child:

1. Stillborn son (Dresden, 20 January 1606)

In Torgau on 19 July 1607 Johann Georg married secondly Magdalene Sibylle, daughter of Albert Frederick, Duke of Prussia. They had ten children:

1. Stillborn son (Dresden, 18 July 1608)
2. Sophie Eleonore (b. Dresden, 23 November 1609 – d. Darmstadt, 2 June 1671), married on 1 April 1627 George II, Landgrave of Hesse-Darmstadt
3. Marie Elisabeth (b. Dresden, 22 November 1610 – d. Husum, 24 October 1684), married on 21 February 1630 to Frederick III, Duke of Holstein-Gottorp
4. Christian Albert (b. Dresden, 4 March 1612 – d. Dresden, 9 August 1612) died in infancy.
5. John George II (b. Dresden, 31 May 1613 – d. Freiberg, 22 August 1680), successor of his father as Elector of Saxony
6. Augustus (b. Dresden, 13 August 1614 – d. Halle, 4 August 1680), inherited Weissenfels as Duke
7. Christian I (b. Dresden, 27 October 1615 – d. Merseburg, 18 October 1691), inherited Merseburg as Duke
8. Magdalene Sibylle (b. Dresden, 23 December 1617 – d. Schloss Altenburg, 6 January 1668), married on 5 October 1634 to Crown Prince Christian, eldest son and heir of King Christian IV of Denmark; and, secondly, on 11 October 1652, to Frederick William II, Duke of Saxe-Altenburg
9. Maurice (b. Dresden, 28 March 1619 – d. Moritzburg, 4 December 1681), inherited Zeitz as Duke
10. Henry (b. Dresden, 27 June 1622 – d. Dresden, 15 August 1622) died in infancy.

== See also ==
- List of big-game hunters

== Notes ==
Regnal titles
Preceded by Christian II	Elector of Saxony; 1611–1656	Succeeded by John George II
