= George William, Margrave of Brandenburg-Bayreuth =

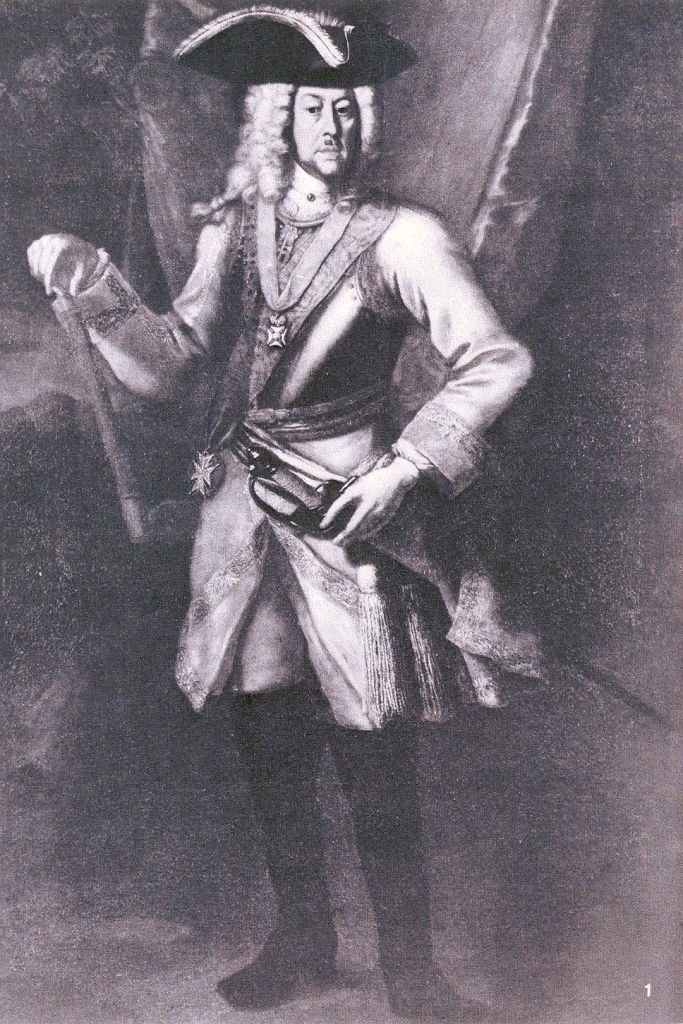
- George William, Margrave of Brandenburg-Bayreuth
- Born: 26 November 1678; Bayreuth
- Died: 18 December 1726 (aged 48); Bayreuth
- Spouse: Sophie of Saxe-Weissenfels
- House: House of Hohenzollern
- Father: Christian Ernst, Margrave of Brandenburg-Bayreuth
- Mother: Sophie Luise of Württemberg

George William of Brandenburg-Bayreuth (German: Georg Wilhelm; 16 November 1678 in Bayreuth – 18 December 1726 in Bayreuth) was a member of the House of Hohenzollern and Margrave of Brandenburg-Bayreuth.

== Family ==
He was the first son of Christian Ernst, Margrave of Brandenburg-Bayreuth by his second wife, Sophie Luise of Württemberg, the fifth of six children. Two sisters died in infancy before his own birth, and his only brother, born in 1679, lived only five months. Of his two surviving sisters, the eldest, Christiane Eberhardine, became the wife of August II the Strong, Elector of Saxony and King of Poland, and the youngest, Eleonore Magdalene, married a distant kinsman, Hermann Frederick, Count of Hohenzollern-Hechingen.

== Life ==
George William succeeded his father as margrave of Bayreuth when he died on 20 May 1712. He pursued a military career due to a lack of academic aptitude and participated successfully on the imperial side in numerous battles. In this connection, he was seriously hit by a musket ball near Landau, a wound that never healed completely. In his youth, before acceding to the margraviate, he created the suburb of Sankt Georgen. It was intended to be a self-contained city (today in the district of Bayreuth) built in baroque style with a castle in the lake. In the artificially-created Brandenburg Pond (German: Brandenburger Weiher), fed by the Steinach tributary, he installed a ski jump and organized naval battles with real ships. On 17 November 1705, he created the Order of the Red Eagle (German: Roter Adlerorden), then known as the Ordre de la Sincérité, and celebrated the anniversary of its foundation every year with splendid festivities. The Order of the Red Eagle also possessed its own church, the Sophienkirche. 18th-century coats of arms of the Order are displayed there to this day.

The margrave was an enthusiastic hunter who built the Emperor's Hunting Seat (German: Kaiserhammer) and the Thiergarten. In addition, he is considered the builder of the Hermitage Museum and Schloss Neustädtlein. As margrave, he expanded the armed forces substantially.

== Marriage and issue ==
In Leipzig on 16 October 1699 George William married Sophie of Saxe-Weissenfels. They had five children:

1. Christiane Sophie Wilhelmine (b. Bayreuth, 6 January 1701 - d. Kulmbach, 15 July 1749). The only surviving child of her parents, she was involved in a scandal that led to the birth of twins born out of wedlock. Both died shortly after their birth in 1724. For her indiscretion, she was banished to her uncle's court in Kulmbach, where she died, unmarried and childless, twenty-five years later. Before her departure from her father's court, was allowed to imbed her petschaft (a necklace with a seal) in the wall of her room in the Schloss Himmelkron. In 1977 this object was finally found and is now displayed in the Museum of the Collegiate Church of Bayreuth (Stiftskirchenmuseum).
2. Eberhardine Elisabeth (b. Bayreuth, 13 January 1706 - d. Bayreuth, 3 October 1709).
3. Christian William (b. Bayreuth, 14 November 1706 - d. Bayreuth, 16 November 1706).
4. Christian Frederick William (b. Bayreuth, 7 June 1709 - d. Bayreuth, 9 June 1709).
5. Francis Adolph William (b. and d. Bayreuth, 7 June 1709), Christian's twin.

Devastated by the tragedy surrounding his beloved daughter, George William suffered a fatal decline in his health and died only two years later. Without surviving male issue, he was succeeded by his cousin George Frederick Charles, Margrave of Kulmbach.

== Ancestors ==
Ancestors of George William, Margrave of Brandenburg-Bayreuth

16. John George, Elector of Brandenburg (= 20)
8. Christian, Margrave of Brandenburg-Bayreuth
17. Elisabeth of Anhalt-Zerbst (= 21)
4. Erdmann August of Brandenburg-Bayreuth
18. Albert Frederick, Duke of Prussia
9. Marie of Prussia
19. Marie Eleonore of Cleves
2. Christian Ernst, Margrave of Brandenburg-Bayreuth
20. John George, Elector of Brandenburg (= 16)
10. Joachim Ernst, Margrave of Brandenburg-Ansbach
21. Elisabeth of Anhalt-Zerbst (= 17)
5. Sophie of Brandenburg-Ansbach (1614-1646)
22. John George I of Solms-Laubach (= 30)
11. Sophie of Solms-Laubach
23. Margarethe of Schönburg-Glauchau (= 31)
1. George William, Margrave of Brandenburg-Bayreuth
24. Frederick I, Duke of Württemberg
12. John Frederick, Duke of Württemberg
25. Sibylla of Anhalt
6. Eberhard III, Duke of Württemberg
26. Joachim III Frederick, Elector of Brandenburg
13. Barbara Sophie of Brandenburg
27. Catherine of Brandenburg-Küstrin
3. Sofie Louise of Württemberg
28. Otto I of Salm-Kyrburg
14. Johannes Casimir, Wild-and Rhinegrave of Salm-Kyrburg
29. Ottilia of Nassau-Weilburg
7. Anna Catherine, Wild- and Rhinegravine of Salm-Kyrburg
30. John George I of Solms-Laubach (= 22)
15. Dorothea of Solms-Laubach
31. Margaret of Schönburg-Glauchau (= 23)

George William, Margrave of Brandenburg-Bayreuth House of Hohenzollern Born: 26 November 1678 Died: 18 December 1726
| Preceded by Christian Ernst | Margrave of Brandenburg-Bayreuth; 1712 – 1726 | Succeeded by George Frederick Charles |
