= Frederick Ernest of Brandenburg-Kulmbach =

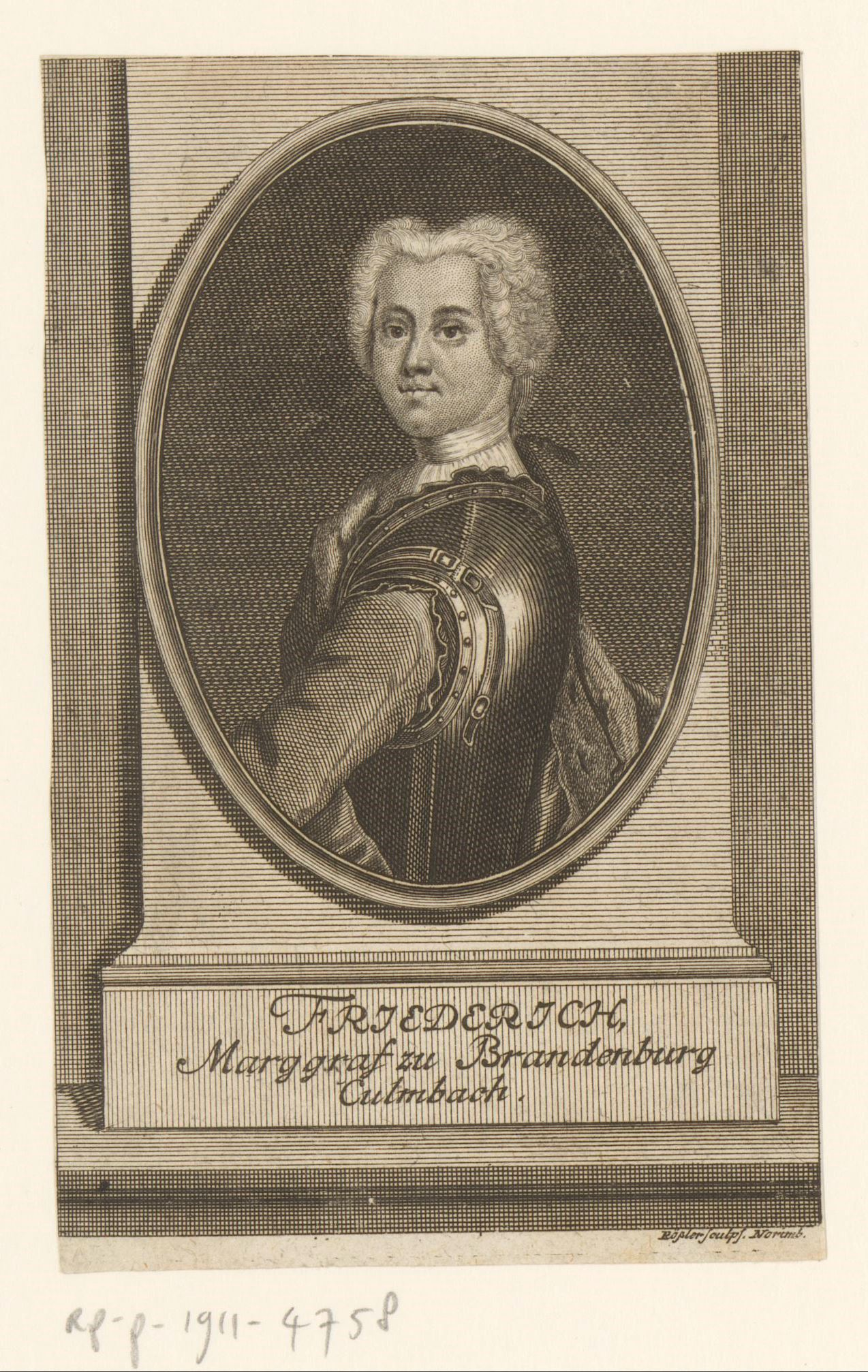
- Born: 15 December 1703; Schönberg
- Died: 23 June 1762 (aged 58); Drage
- Buried: St. Michael's Church in Hohenaspe
- Noble family: House of Hohenzollern
- Spouse: Christine Sophie of Brunswick-Bevern
- Father: Christian Heinrich, Margrave of Brandenburg-Bayreuth-Kulmbach
- Mother: Sophie Christiane of Wolfstein

Frederick Ernest of Brandenburg-Kulmbach (15 December 1703 – 23 June 1762 in Drage) was a member of the Brandenburg-Kulmbach branch of the House of Hohenzollern. His most significant position was governor of the Duchies of Schleswig and Holstein-Glückstadt.

== Background ==
He was the son of Margrave Christian Heinrich of Brandenburg-Kulmbach and his wife Sophie Christiane of Wolfstein. His sister, Sophia Magdalen of Brandenburg-Kulmbach was married with King Christian VI of Denmark. At the time, Denmark was in personal union with the Duchies of Schleswig and Holstein-Glückstadt, the royal share in the Duchy of Holstein. Christian VI appointed his brother-in-law Frederick Ernest as governor of the duchies.

== Life ==
Frederick Ernest was made a Knight of the Order of the Elephant by his royal brother-in-law. In 1731, he received Gottorf Castle as his seat, the former seat of the Dukes of Schleswig and Holstein at Gottorp. However, he preferred to build his own residence at the site of the manor at Drage, which the king had given to him on the occasion of his wedding with Christine Sophie, the daughter of Duke Ernest Ferdinand of Brunswick-Bevern. The old manor house was demolished and Friedrichsruh Castle was constructed between 1744 and 1751, after a design of the Danish court architect Nicolai Eigtved.

Frederick Ernest and his wife lived far beyond their means, and when he died childless in 1762, he left a heavily indebted estate. Frederick Ernest and his wife were buried in the St. Michael's Church in Hohenaspe. He was succeeded as governor of Schleswig and Holstein-Glückstadt by Friedrich Ludwig von Dehn.

The Margrave Room in Glücksburg Castle is named after Frederick Ernest. He resided there for a while.
