= Sophie Christiane of Wolfstein =

German aristocrat (1667–1737)

- Born: 24 October 1667; Sulzbürg (near Mühlhausen)
- Died: 23 August 1737 (aged 69); Fredensborg Palace
- Buried: Roskilde Cathedral
- Noble family: Wolfstein
- Spouse: Christian Heinrich, Margrave of Brandenburg-Bayreuth-Kulmbach
- Issue Detail: Georg Frederick Karl; Albert Wolfgang; Sophie Magdalene; Frederick Ernest; Sophie Caroline; Frederick Christian
- Father: Albert Frederick, Count of Wolfstein
- Mother: Sophia Louise of Castell-Remlingen

Sophie Christiane of Wolfstein (24 October 1667 – 23 August 1737) was a Countess of Wolfstein by birth and a Margravine of Brandenburg-Bayreuth-Kulmbach by marriage.

== Early life and ancestry ==
Sophie Christiane was a daughter of Count Albrecht Frederick of Wolfstein-Sulzbürg (1644–1693) from his marriage to Countess Sophia Louise of Castell-Remlingen (1645–1717), daughter of Count Georg Wolfgang of Castell-Remlingen (1610–1668) and Countess Sophie Juliane of Hohenlohe-Waldenburg-Pfedelbach (1620–1682). Sophie Christiane's maternal uncle Count Wolfgang Dietrich of Castell-Remlingen (1641–1709) was married to Countess Dorothea Renata von Zinzendorf and Pottendorf (1669–1743), an aunt of Count Nicholas Ludwig von Zinzendorf und Pottendorf (1700–1760). Due to the connection, Sophie Christiane was consequently raised strictly religiously in the Pietist manner, in which she remained for the rest of her life.

== Marriage ==
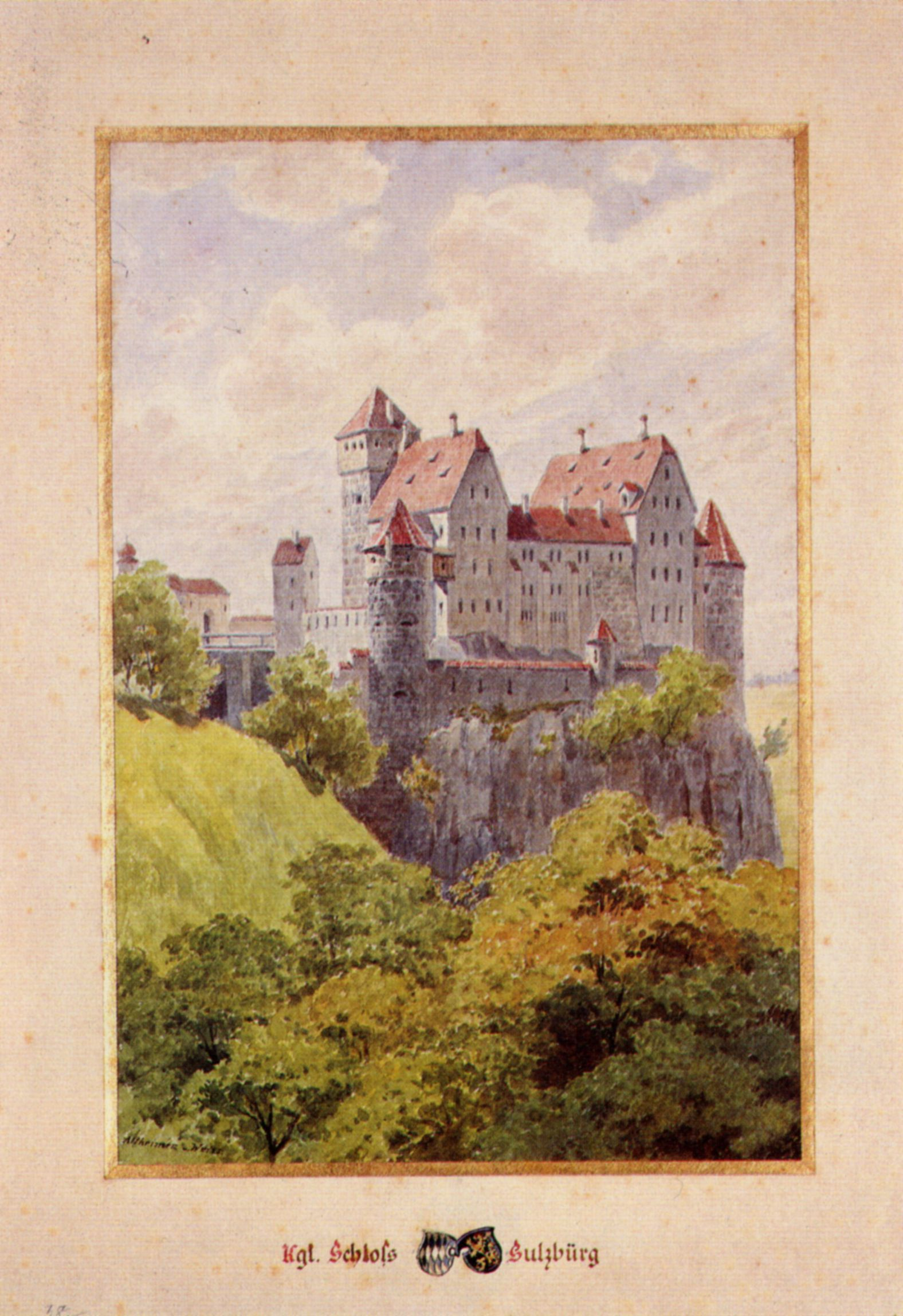
Obersulzbürg castle, ancestral seat of the Counts of Wolfstein-Sulzbürg

On 14 August 1687, she married Christian Heinrich, Margrave of Brandenburg-Bayreuth-Kulmbach (1661–1708), at Obersulzbürg Castle, an ancestral seat of her family. The margrave's court at Bayreuth felt that his spouse was "not befitting" (i.e. not of high enough birth to marry a member of an old ruling family), as her family only recently acquired the status of reigning Imperial Count (in 1673) for immediate Lordship of Sulzbürg-Pyrbaum. In the end, after many obstacles, the marriage was recognized and treated as an equal one.

After the birth of their first child, the couple moved into the castle at Schönberg, where Sophie Christiane, who was described as "admirable," took care of raising her many children, half of whom went on to die in early childhood. Despite constant pregnancies, she composed a prayer book, the so-called Schönberger Gesangbuch, containing the prayers used in the daily "prayer meeting". In 1703, Christian Heinrich and King Frederick I of Prussia concluded the Treaty of Schönberg, in which Christian Heinrich ceded Brandenburg-Ansbach to Prussia in exchange for the Weferlingen district near Magdeburg. The family then moved to Weferlingen Castle.

== Later life in Denmark ==
After her husband's death, her son-in-law, King Christian VI of Denmark, invited her to Denmark, which became a Pietist refuge.

== Death ==
Margravine Sophie Christiane died in Copenhagen on 23 August in 1737, at the age of 69. Her body was buried in the Roskilde Cathedral, Copenhagen, Kingdom of Denmark.

== Issue ==
Sophie Christiane had 24 pregnancies in 27 years but gave birth to only 14 children of which seven survived into adulthood:

1. Georg Frederick Karl (b. Schloss Obersulzbürg, 30 June 1688 – d. Bayreuth, 17 May 1735), who finally inherited Bayreuth in 1726.
2. Albert Wolfgang (b. Schloss Obersulzbürg, 8 December 1689 – killed in action, near Parma, 29 June 1734).
3. Dorothea Charlotte (b. Schloss Obersulzbürg, 15 March 1691 – d. Weikersheim, 18 March 1712); married on 7 August 1711 to Karl Ludwig, Count of Hohenlohe-Weikersheim.
4. Frederick Emanuel (b. Schloss Obersulzbürg, 13 February 1692 – d. Schloss Obersulzbürg, 13 January 1693); died in infancy.
5. Christiane Henriette (b. Schloss Obersulzbürg, 29 August 1693 – d. Schönberg, 19 May 1695); died in early childhood.
6. Frederick Wilhelm (b. Schönberg, 12 January 1695 – d. Schönberg, 13 May 1695); died in infancy.
7. A miscarriage of a daughter in the 4th month of pregnancy (19 December 1695).
8. A miscarriage of a daughter in the 6th month of pregnancy (16 August 1697).
9. Christiane (b. and d. Schönberg, 31 October 1698).
10. Christian August (b. Schönberg, 14 July 1699 – d. Schönberg, 29 July 1700); died in early childhood.
11. Sophie Magdalene (b. Schönberg, 28 November 1700 – d. Christiansborg Castle, 27 May 1770); married on 7 August 1721 to King Christian VI of Denmark.
12. Christine Wilhelmine (b. Schönberg, 17 June 1702 – d. Schönberg, 19 March 1704); died in early childhood.
13. Frederick Ernest (b. Schönberg, 15 December 1703 – d. Schloss Friedrichsruhe in Drage, 23 June 1762); married on 26 December 1731 to Duchess Christine Sophie of Brunswick-Bevern. The union was childless.
14. Marie Eleonore (b. Schönberg, 28 December 1704 – d. Schönberg, 4 June 1705); died in infancy.
15. Sophie Caroline (b. Weferlingen, 31 March 1705 – d. Sorgenfri Castle, 7 June 1764); married on 8 December 1723 to George Albert, Prince of East Frisia.
16. A miscarriage in the 1st month of pregnancy (22 January 1706).
17. A miscarriage of a son in the 4th and a half month of pregnancy (17 January 1707).
18. Frederick Christian (b. posthumously, Weferlingen, 17 July 1708 – d. Bayreuth, 20 January 1769), inherited Bayreuth in 1763.
19. A miscarriage in the 1st month of pregnancy (4 December 1709).
20. A miscarriage in the 1st month of pregnancy (30 January 1710).
21. A miscarriage in the 1st month of pregnancy (30 March 1710).
22. A miscarriage of a son in the 5th and a half month of pregnancy (11 January 1712).
23. A miscarriage of a son in the 4th and a half month of pregnancy (20 March 1713).
24. A miscarriage in 1714.

Sophie Christiane of Wolfstein House of Wolfstein Born: 24 October 1667 Died: 23 August 1737
German nobility
Vacant Title last held by Sophie Marie of Solms-Baruth-Wildenfels	Margravine consort of Brandenburg-Bayreuth-Kulmbach; 14 August 1687 – 5 April 1708	Vacant Title next held by Dorothea of Schleswig-Holstein-Sonderburg-Beck
