= Albert Wolfgang of Brandenburg-Bayreuth =

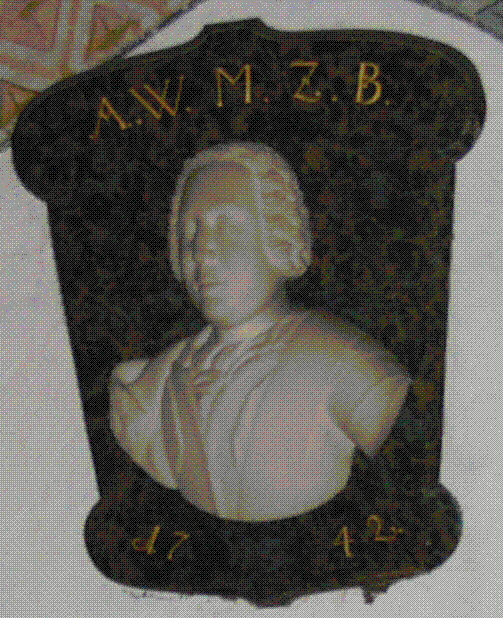
- A.W.M.z.B. abbreviates Albrecht Wolfgang, Markgraf zu Brandenburg
- Born: 8 December 1689; Sulzbürg, now part of Mühlhausen
- Died: 29 June 1734 (aged 44); Parma
- Buried: Himmelskron Abbey
- Noble family: House of Hohenzollern
- Father: Christian Heinrich, Margrave of Brandenburg-Bayreuth-Kulmbach
- Mother: Sophie Christiane of Wolfstein

Albert Wolfgang of Brandenburg-Bayreuth (8 December 1689 in Sulzbürg, now part of Mühlhausen – 29 June 1734 in Parma) was a Margrave of Brandenburg-Bayreuth from the Kulmbach-Bayreuth side line of Franconian branch of the House of Hohenzollern. He served as a general in the imperial army.

== Life ==
Wolfgang Albrecht was the second son of Margrave Christian Henry of Brandenburg-Bayreuth (1661-1708) from his marriage to Sophie Christiane (1667-1737), the daughter of Count Albert Frederik of Wolfstein at Sulzbürg. He and his older brother George Frederick Charles grew up in Bielefeld. They studied at the University of Utrecht together. After his Grand Tour, which took him to France, England and Italy, he entered the Imperial service.

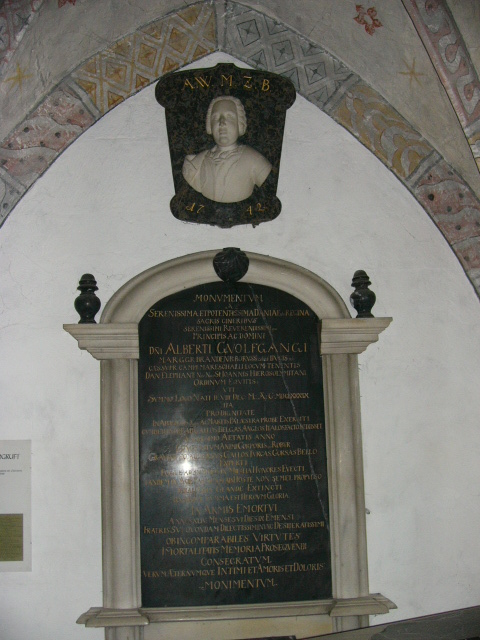
His grave in Himmelskron Abbey

During his military career he attained the rank of Lieutenant General. He and field marshal Claude Florimond de Mercy were killed during an attack on Crocetta castle in Parma. He was initially buried in Bayreuth; in 1742, his body was transferred to Himmelskron Abbey, where his sister, Queen Sophia Magdalene of Denmark erected a monument to commemorate him.
