= Gunderup (manor house) =

Manor house in Køge Municipality, Denmark

- Interactive map of the Gunderup area

General information
- Location: Gunderupvej 14; 4600 Køge, Denmark
- Coordinates: 55°24′5.69″N 12°10′0.05″E
- Completed: 1861

Gunderup is a manor house located in Køge Municipality, Denmark. It has been associated with Vallø since its establishment in 1592 and is today managed as a farm under Vallø stift.

== History ==
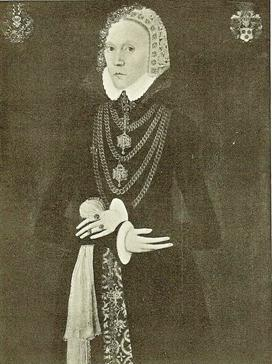
Mette Rosenkrantz

Gunderup was originally a village that belonged to Vallø in 1421. The Gunderup estate was established as a farm (ladegård) under Vester Vallø by Mette Rosenkrantz in 1582. Vallø was from the mid-16th to the mid-17th century divided into a western and an eastern estate.

In 1610, Mette Rosenkrantz' son Oluf Steen Rosensparre gave Gunderup to his wife as a widow seat. She owned both Gunderup and Vester Vallø until her death in 1638. The estates were then taken over by Christen Skeel, who already owned Øster Vallø. Since then Gunderup has remained in the hands of the same owners as Vallø. Queen Sophie Magdalene founded Vallø stift in 1737.

== Architecture ==
The main building is from 1861. It is a white-rendered, single-storey building built in red brick and has a slate roof.

== Today ==
Gunderup is managed as a farm under Vallø stift.

== List of owners ==
- (1582–1588) Mette Rosenkrantz, widow (1) Rosensparre, (2) Oxe
- (1588–1624) Oluf Steen Rosensparre
- (1624–1638) Elisabeth Gyldenstjerne, widow Rosensparre
- (1638–1659) Christen Albretsen Skeel
- (1659–1695) Otto Skeel
- (1695–1707) Christen Skeel
- (1707–1708) Christian Siegfried von Plessen
- (1708–1713) The Crown
- (1713–1730) Queen Anna Sophie Reventlow
- (1730–1731) The Crown
- (1731–1737) Queen Sophie Magdalene of Brandenburg-Kulmbach
- (1737–present) Vallø stift
