= George Frederick Charles, Margrave of Brandenburg-Bayreuth =

German prince (1688–1735)

George Frederick Charles
- Margrave of Brandenburg-Bayreuth
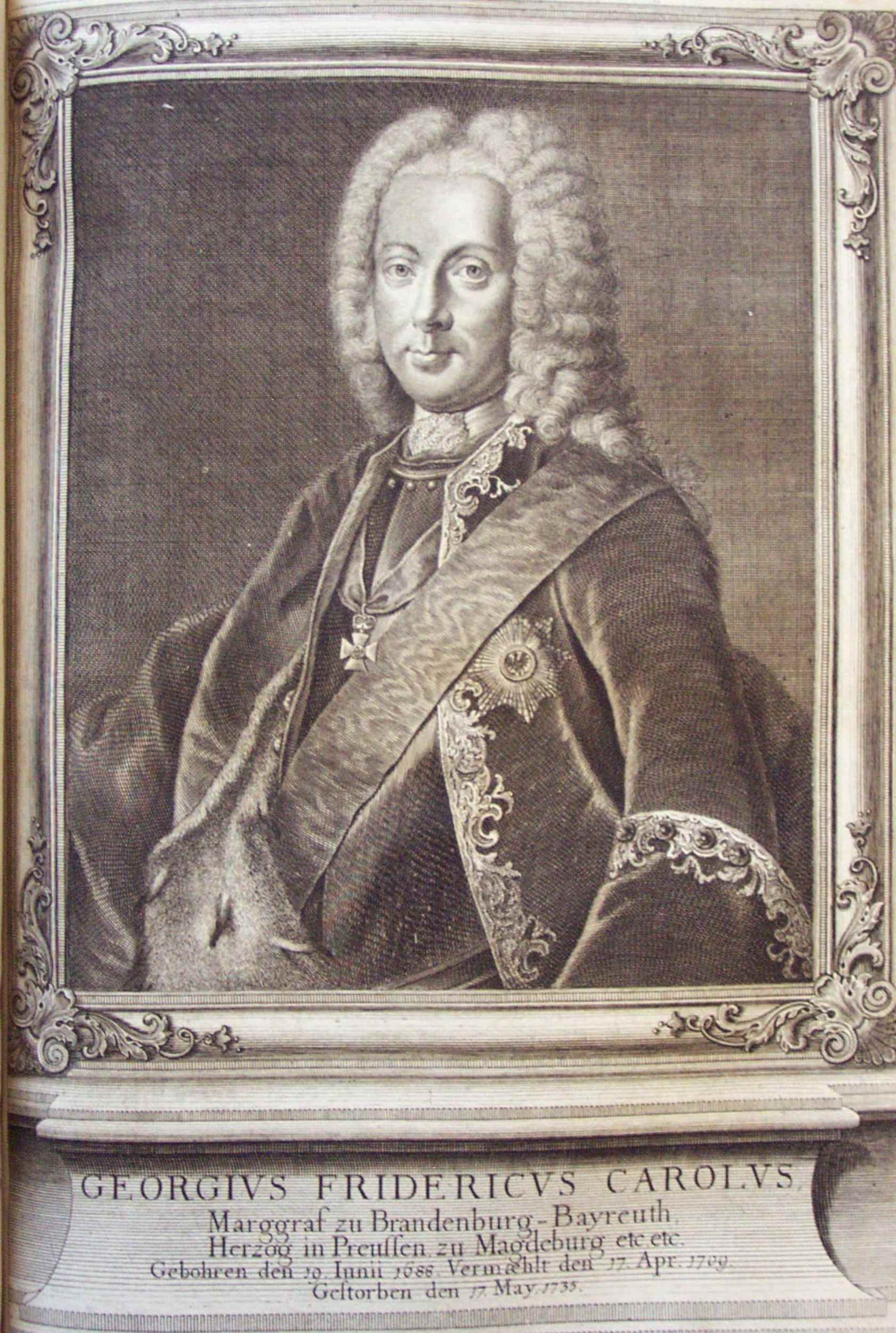
- 18th century engraving
- Born: 30 June 1688; Obersulzbürg Castle (near Mühlhausen)
- Died: 17 May 1735 (aged 46); Bayreuth
- Spouse: Dorothea of Schleswig-Holstein-Sonderburg-Beck
- Issue Detail: Sophie Christiane Luise; Frederick; Sophie Charlotte Albertine
- House: Hohenzollern
- Father: Christian Heinrich of Brandenburg-Bayreuth-Kulmbach
- Mother: Sophie Christiane of Wolfstein

George Frederick Charles, Margrave of Brandenburg-Bayreuth (19 June 1688 at Obersulzbürg Castle, near Mühlhausen – 17 May 1735 in Bayreuth), was a German prince, member of the House of Hohenzollern, nominal Margrave of Brandenburg-Bayreuth-Kulmbach (1708–35) and Margrave of Brandenburg-Bayreuth (1726–35).

== Family ==
He was the eldest of the fourteen children born to Margrave Christian Heinrich of Brandenburg-Bayreuth-Kulmbach by his wife, Countess Sophie Christiane of Wolfstein. Besides him, only six of his siblings survived childhood: Albrecht Wolfgang, killed in battle in 1734; Dorothea Charlotte, Countess of Hohenlohe-Weikersheim, who died in 1712 after only seven months of marriage; Sophie Magdalene, Queen of Denmark; Frederick Ernst; Sophie Caroline, Princess of Ostfriesland; and Frederick Christian, who later inherited the margraviate of Bayreuth.

== Life ==
During his early years, George Frederick Charles was instructed by his very religious mother, and later received a careful formal education in Bielefeld. From 1700 to 1704, he travelled to western Europe as part of a traditional educational journey (Grand Tour), and visited, among other countries, Denmark, France and the Dutch Republic. Later, he studied four years at the University of Utrecht. After the death of his father in 1708 he returned with his family, who had lived since 1704 in the Schloss Weferlingen near Magdeburg, and assumed the nominal title of Margrave of Brandenburg-Bayreuth-Kulmbach.

Schloss Weferlingen had been assigned to his family as an appanage by King Frederick I of Prussia, after George Frederick Charles's heavily indebted father had renounced his succession rights to the Franconian Hohenzollern estates of Bayreuth and Ansbach in favour of Prussia in the Contract of Schönberg. George Frederick Charles nonetheless tried to recover his rights after the death of his father and sought the abolition of this contract. He was able to secure the support of the Franconian states, who feared being merged into the Franconian Circle by Prussia. George Frederick Charles could also rely on the decisive assistance of the Archbishop of Mainz, the Aulic Council (Imperial Supreme Court), and Prince-Bishop of Bamberger Lothar Franz von Schönborn and his nephew, the Imperial Vice-Chancellor (German: Reichsvizekanzler) Friedrich Karl von Schönborn, who supported the abolition of the Contract of Schönberg. His efforts finally succeeded only in 1722 after long and difficult discussions and the payment of a substantial indemnity to Prussia.

When the Margrave Georg Wilhelm died in 1726 without surviving male issue, George Frederick Charles assumed the principality of Bayreuth without further difficulties.

After his accession, George Frederick Charles put great value on the improvement of the ruined finances of his territories and made local government his highest priority. In contrast to many of his contemporary rulers, he had no political or military ambitions. Instead he was very pious and intensely supported August Hermann Francke in inculcating the importance of religious life for his subjects. He was remarkable for his support of orphanages.

He was uninterested in court life, and in his last years built up Schloss Himmelkron, a former monastery, probably with plans to retire there.

In the memoirs of his daughter-in-law Wilhelmine of Prussia, George Frederick Charles is described as a thin, bandy-legged, egotistical, wrong-headed, jealous person. The antipathy was mutual. The margrave harassed his daughter-in-law in much the same way that her parents had done. When Wilhelmine gave birth to a daughter, it destroyed George Frederick Karl's hopes to take charge of his grandchild's upbringing, since he was allowed to supervise the education of his son Frederick's child only if it were a boy, according to the marriage contract signed with Wilhelmine. Frederick supported his wife and the drunk margrave hit him with his stick without injuring him.

== Marriage and issue ==
In Reinfeld on 17 April 1709 George Frederick Charles married Dorothea of Schleswig-Holstein-Sonderburg-Beck. They had five children:

1. Sophie Christiane Luise (b. Weferlingen, 4 January 1710 – d. Brussels, 13 June 1739), married on 11 April 1731 to Alexander Ferdinand, 3rd Prince of Thurn and Taxis.
2. Frederick (b. Weferlingen, 10 May 1711 – d. Bayreuth, 26 February 1763), successor of his father as Margrave of Bayreuth.
3. Wilhelm Ernst (b. Weferlingen, 26 July 1712 – d. Mantua, 7 November 1733).
4. Sophie Charlotte Albertine (b. Weferlingen, 27 July 1713 – d. Ilmenau, 2 March 1747), married on 7 April 1734 to Duke Ernst August I of Saxe-Weimar.
5. Sophie Wilhelmine (b. Weferlingen, 8 July 1714 – d. Aurich, 7 September 1749), married on 25 May 1734 to Prince Charles Edzard of East Frisia.

After seven years of unhappy marriage, George Frederick Charles and Dorothea separated in 1716. Eight years later (1724), their marriage was formally dissolved. Dorothea later emigrated to Sweden, where she died in 1761, twenty years after her former husband. Neither of them remarried.

== Ancestry ==
Ancestors of George Frederick Charles, Margrave of Brandenburg-Bayreuth

8. Christian, Margrave of Brandenburg-Bayreuth
4. Georg Albrecht, Margrave of Brandenburg-Bayreuth-Kulmbach
9. Duchess Marie of Prussia
2. Christian Heinrich, Margrave of Brandenburg-Bayreuth-Kulmbach
10. Philip, Duke of Schleswig-Holstein-Sonderburg-Glücksburg
5. Princess Marie Elisabeth of Schleswig-Holstein-Sonderburg-Glücksburg
11. Princess Sophie Hedwig of Saxe-Lauenburg
1. George Frederick Charles, Margrave of Brandenburg-Bayreuth
12. Johann Friedrich, Count of Wolfstein
6. Albrecht Friedrich, Count of Wolfstein
13. Baroness Barbara Teufel von Guntersdorf
3. Countess Sophie Christiane of Wolfstein
14. Wolfgang Georg I, Count of Castell-Remlingen
7. Countess Sophie Luise of Castell-Remlingen
15. Countess Sophie Juliana of Hohenlohe-Waldenburg-Pfedelbach

George Frederick Charles, Margrave of Brandenburg-Bayreuth House of Hohenzollern Born: 30 June 1688 Died: 17 May 1735
Preceded by Georg Wilhelm	Margrave of Brandenburg-Bayreuth; 1726–1735	Succeeded by Frederick
