= Christian Henry, Margrave of Brandenburg-Kulmbach =

German prince

Christian Heinrich, Margrave of Brandenburg-Bayreuth-Kulmbach
- Born: 29 July 1661; Bayreuth
- Died: 5 April 1708 (aged 46); Weferlingen
- Spouse: Sophie Christiane of Wolfstein
- Issue Detail: Georg Frederick Karl; Albert Wolfgang; Sophie Magdalene; Frederick Ernest; Sophie Caroline; Frederick Christian
- House: House of Hohenzollern
- Father: Georg Albrecht of Brandenburg-Bayreuth
- Mother: Maria Elisabeth of Schleswig-Holstein-Sonderburg-Glücksburg

Christian Heinrich of Brandenburg-Bayreuth-Kulmbach (29 July 1661, in Bayreuth – 5 April 1708, in Weferlingen), was a German prince and member of the House of Hohenzollern and nominal Margrave of Brandenburg-Bayreuth-Kulmbach.

== Family ==
He was the fifth of the six children born to Georg Albrecht of Brandenburg-Bayreuth-Kulmbach by his first wife, Princess Marie Elisabeth of Schleswig-Holstein-Sonderburg-Glücksburg.

Christian Heinrich was the fourth-born son, but was the first to survive to adulthood: His two older brothers, Christian Philipp (b. and d. 1653) and Georg Frederick (b. 1657 - d. 1658) died before his own birth, and the third but eldest who survived infancy, Erdmann Philipp, died after falling from his horse in 1678, aged nineteen. His younger brother - and with him, the two only children of his parents who survived to adulthood - Karl August, died unmarried and childless in 1731 aged sixty-eight. Between the older brothers, a short-living sister, Sophie Amalie, was born.

From his father's second marriage with Countess Sophie Marie of Solms-Baruth, Christian Heinrich had a half-brother, Georg Albrecht, who was born three months after the death of his father in 1666.

== Life ==
In 1694 he accepted the invitation of his kinsman, the Margrave of Brandenburg-Ansbach, to move in with his family in the Castle Schönberg, Ansbach enclave in the Imperial City (German: Reichsstadt) of Nuremberg. With a modest allowance and heavily indebted, Christian Heinrich signed, in 1703, the Contract of Schönberg. Under the terms of this treaty, he renounced his succession rights over the Franconian estates of the House of Hohenzollern (the principalities of Ansbach and Bayreuth) in favour of Prussia. As a compensation of these renunciation, the King Frederick I of Prussia secured the financial situation of Christian Heinrich and his family in Prussia and assigned to him as a new domicile the Schloss Weferlingen near Magdeburg. The following year (1704) he moved there with his family. Four years later he died in Weferlingen, aged forty-seven and three months before the birth of his last child.

After Christian Heinrich's death, his oldest son Georg Frederick Karl pursued the abolition of the Contract of Schönberg; only in 1722, after long and difficult discussions, did he finally recover the succession rights of his family to Bayreuth and Ansbach.

== Marriage and children ==
In the Castle Obersulzbürg on 14 August 1687, Christian Heinrich married Countess Sophie Christiane of Wolfstein. They had fourteen children:

1. Georg Frederick Karl (b. Schloss Oberzulzbürg, 30 June 1688 – d. Bayreuth, 17 May 1735), who finally inherited Bayreuth in 1726.
2. Albert Wolfgang (b. Schloss Obersulzbürg, 8 December 1689 – killed in action, near Parma, 29 June 1734).
3. Dorothea Charlotte (b. Schloss Obersulzbürg, 15 March 1691 – d. Weikersheim, 18 March 1712); married on 7 August 1711 to Karl Ludwig, Count of Hohenlohe-Weikersheim.
4. Frederick Emanuel (b. Schloss Obersulzbürg, 13 February 1692 – d. Schloss Obersulzbürg, 13 January 1693).
5. Christiane Henriette (b. Schloss Obersulzbürg, 29 August 1693 – d. Schönberg, 19 May 1695).
6. Frederick Wilhelm (b. Schönberg, 12 January 1695 – d. Schönberg, 13 May 1695).
7. Christiane (b. and d. Schönberg, 31 October 1698).
8. Christian August (b. Schönberg, 14 July 1699 – d. Schönberg, 29 July 1700).
9. Sophie Magdalene (b. Schönberg, 28 November 1700 – d. Christiansborg Castle, 27 May 1770); married on 7 August 1721 to King Christian VI of Denmark.
10. Christine Wilhelmine (b. Schönberg, 17 June 1702 – d. Schönberg, 19 March 1704).
11. Frederick Ernest (b. Schönberg, 15 December 1703 – d. Schloss Friedrichsruhe in Drage, 23 June 1762); married on 26 December 1731 to Duchess Christine Sophie of Brunswick-Bevern. The union was childless.
12. Marie Eleonore (b. Schönberg, 28 December 1704 – d. Schönberg, 4 June 1705).
13. Sophie Caroline (b. Weferlingen, 31 March 1705 – d. Sorgenfri Castle, 7 June 1764); married on 8 December 1723 to George Albert, Prince of East Frisia.
14. Frederick Christian (b. posthumously, Weferlingen, 17 July 1708 – d. Bayreuth, 20 January 1769), inherited Bayreuth in 1763.
