= Frederick Christian, Margrave of Brandenburg-Bayreuth =

Margrave of Brandenburg-Bayreuth

Frederick Christian of Brandenburg-Bayreuth
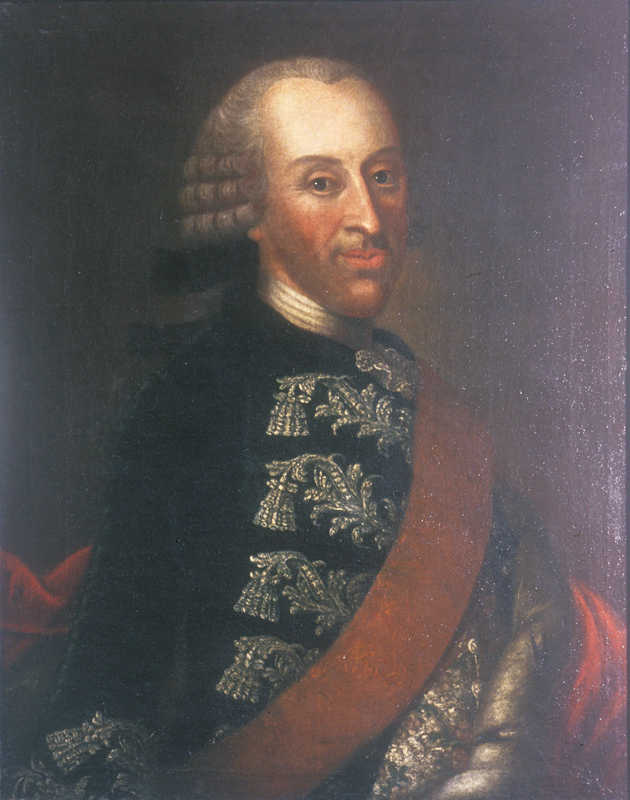
- Portrait c. 1765
- Born: 17 July 1708; Weferlingen
- Died: 20 January 1769 (aged 60); Bayreuth
- Noble family: House of Hohenzollern
- Spouse: Victoria Charlotte of Anhalt-Zeitz-Hoym
- Issue Detail: Christiane Sophie Charlotte of Brandenburg-Bayreuth
- Father: Christian Heinrich of Brandenburg-Bayreuth-Kulmbach
- Mother: Sophie Christiane of Wolfstein

Frederick Christian of Brandenburg-Bayreuth (17 July 1708 in Weferlingen – 20 January 1769 in Bayreuth), was a member of the House of Hohenzollern and Margrave of Brandenburg-Bayreuth.

== Family ==
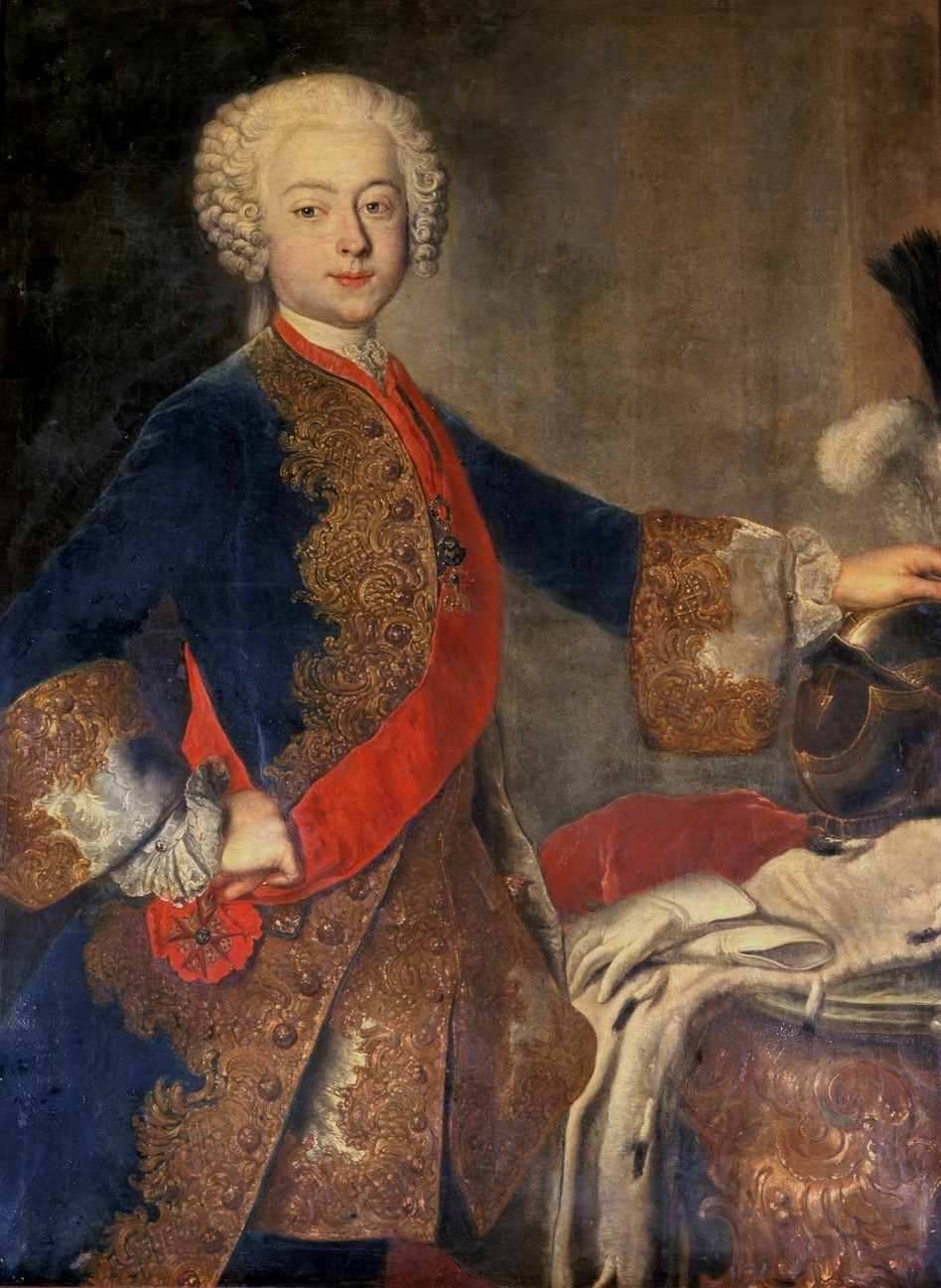
Portrait of Frederick Christian by Jan Kupecký, 18th century

He was the youngest of fourteen children born to Margrave Christian Heinrich of Brandenburg-Bayreuth-Kulmbach by his wife, Countess Sophie Christiane of Wolfstein. His father died on 5 April 1708, almost three months before his birth.

Besides him, only six of his siblings survived to adulthood: Georg Frederick Karl, who became Margrave of Bayreuth; Albrecht Wolfgang, who was killed in battle in 1734; Dorothea Charlotte, Countess of Hohenlohe-Weikersheim, who died in 1712 after only seven months of marriage; Sophie Magdalene, Queen of Denmark; Frederick Ernst; and Sophie Caroline, Princess of Ostfriesland.

== Life ==
Frederick Christian was considered an eccentric, indeed the "black sheep" of the family. By the time of the death of his cousin Georg Wilhelm, Margrave of Bayreuth (1726), he lived as a Danish Lieutenant-general in Wandsbek near Hamburg and was not prepared for any government tasks in the principality of Bayreuth. He did not exercise his power and left all the control of the principality to his older brother George Frederick Charles.

The death of his nephew Frederick without male issue on (26 February 1763), however, found him the only male member of the Bayreuth branch of the family, and, in consequence, the new Margrave of Bayreuth.

After his assumption of the government in Bayreuth, Frederick Christian tried to stabilize the ruined state finances by drastically reducing the costs of the Bayreuth court. Most artists who had worked there (among others, Carl von Gontard) went to Berlin to the court of King Frederick the Great. Almost all construction work in the castles and gardens were stopped. Bayreuth sank again into the Provinzialität (Province state).

== Marriage and issue ==
In Schaumburg an der Lahn on 26 April 1732, Frederick Christian married Victoria Charlotte of Anhalt-Zeitz-Hoym (September 25, 1715 – February 4, 1772). They had two daughters:

1. Christiane Sophie Charlotte (b. Neustadt am Aisch, 15 October 1733 – d. Seidingstadt, 8 October 1757), married on 20 January 1757 to Ernst Frederick III, Duke of Saxe-Hildburghausen.
2. Sophie Magdalene (b. Neustadt am Aisch, 12 January 1737 – d. Neustadt am Aisch, 23 July 1737).

One year after Frederick Christian inherited the margraviate of Bayreuth (1764), he and Victoria Charlotte were divorced, they were already separated since 1739 due to Frederick Christian's jealousy. Victoria Charlotte returned to her homeland, where she died in 1792, twenty-three years after her former husband. Neither of them remarried.

Without male issue, Frederick Christian became the last member of the Younger line of Brandenburg-Bayreuth, which had ruled this principality since 1603. On his death, Bayreuth was inherited by his distant kinsman, Charles Alexander, Margrave of Brandenburg-Ansbach.

== Ancestry ==
Ancestors of Frederick Christian, Margrave of Brandenburg-Bayreuth

16. John George, Elector of Brandenburg
8. Christian, Margrave of Brandenburg-Bayreuth
17. Princess Elisabeth of Anhalt-Zerbst
4. Georg Albrecht, Margrave of Brandenburg-Bayreuth-Kulmbach
18. Albert Frederick, Duke of Prussia
9. Marie of Prussia, Margravine of Brandenburg-Bayreuth
19. Duchess Marie Eleonore of Cleves
2. Christian Heinrich, Margrave of Brandenburg-Bayreuth-Kulmbach
20. John II, Duke of Schleswig-Holstein-Sonderburg
10. Philip, Duke of Schleswig-Holstein-Sonderburg-Glücksburg
21. Duchess Elisabeth of Brunswick-Grubenhagen
5. Princess Marie Elisabeth of Schleswig-Holstein-Sonderburg-Glücksburg
22. Francis II, Duke of Saxe-Lauenburg
11. Princess Sophie Hedwig of Saxe-Lauenburg
23. Duchess Maria of Brunswick-Lüneburg
1. Frederick Christian, Margrave of Brandenburg-Bayreuth
24. Johann Adam, Count of Wolfstein
12. Johann Friedrich, Count of Wolfstein
25. Countess Elisabeth of Limpurg-Speckfeld
6. Albrecht Friedrich, Count of Wolfstein
26. Georg, Baron Teufel von Guntersdorf
13. Baroness Barbara Teufel von Guntersdorf
27. Elisabeth von Puchheim
3. Countess Sophie Christiane of Wolfstein
28. Wolfgang II, Count of Castell-Remlingen
14. Wolfgang Georg I, Count of Castell-Remlingen
29. Countess Juliana of Hohenlohe-Weikersheim
7. Countess Sophie Luise of Castell-Remlingen
30. Ludwig Eberhard, Count of Hohenlohe-Waldenburg-Pfedelbach and Gleichen
15. Countess Sophie Juliana of Hohenlohe-Waldenburg-Pfedelbach
31. Countess Dorothea of Erbach

Frederick Christian, Margrave of Brandenburg-Bayreuth House of Hohenzollern Born: 17 July 1708 Died: 20 January 1769
Preceded by Frederick	Margrave of Brandenburg-Bayreuth; 1763–1769	Succeeded by Charles Alexander
