= Albert Wolfgang =

Albert Wolfgang may refer to:

- Albert Wolfgang, Count of Hohenlohe-Langenburg (1659–1715)
- Albert Wolfgang, Count of Schaumburg-Lippe (1699–1748)
- Albert Wolfgang of Brandenburg-Bayreuth (1689–1734)
