= Regitze Barner =

Danish noblewoman

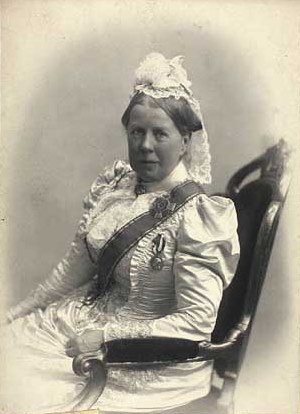
- Barner photographed by Jens Petersen c. 1900
- Born: 28 February 1834; Copenhagen, Denmark
- Died: 2 December 1911 (aged 77); Vallø Castle, Denmark
- Relatives: Kristian Erslev (brother)
- Honours: Medal of Merit

Regitze Vilhelmine Louise Augusta Barner (28 February 1834 – 2 December 1911) was a Danish noblewoman, philanthropist and writer. She is remembered for her efforts to facilitate conditions and opportunities for women, both young and old. These included her involvement in the Deaconess Foundation (Diakonissestiftelsen) and the Prison Association (Fængselsselskabet). In 1879, she founded and chaired the Society for the Protection of Single Women (Foreningen til Værn for enligt stillede Kvinder) which was designed to prevent young women turning to prostitution. In addition to a history of the Deaconess Foundation, shortly before her death she wrote an autobiography which was published in two volumes in 1911.

== Biography ==
Born in Copenhagen on 28 February 1834, Regitze Vilhelmine Louise Augusta Barner was the daughter of the district administrator Conrad Vilhelm Barner (1799–1873) and his wife Jacobine Marie née Castenschiold (1808–1862). After her parents' divorce when she was eight, she lived partly with her mother in Copenhagen and partly in Køge where her father lived.

Inspired by the sermons of Nicolai Gottlieb Blædel in Copenhagen's Garrison Church, she turned to philanthropy. Together with several other women, she established a children's asylum in Køge and visited the sick and needy in their homes. When she was 25, she moved away from home and met the nurse and philanthropist Louise Conring. She first assisted her with looking after the children at the Birth Foundation (Fødselsstiftelsen) and then collaborated with her on establishing the Danish Deaconess Foundation in 1863, becoming a board member until 1884. The Deaconess institutions were based on the original home founded in Germany by Theodor Fliedner and designed to allow women to care for the sick while learning theology and nursing skills. In connection with the Deaconess institutions, in 1862 she published anonymously Nogle Meddelelser om Diakonissegjerningen i ældre og nyere Tid (Details of the Deaconess Institutions in Former and More Recent Times. After moving to Copenhagen, she took a special interest in the Prison Association (Fængselsselskabet) which was founded in 1843 to encourage the inmates to turn to Christian values. In 1879, she founded and chaired the Society for the Protection of Single Women (Foreningen til Værn for enligt stillede Kvinder) which was designed to prevent young women turning to prostitution.

In 1911 Regitze Barner withdrew from her Copenhagen activities to spend her last months in Vallø Castle where she wrote her memoirs, Minder fra mit Liv og min Gjerning (Memories of my Life and Contributions), published in two volumes. She died in the castle on 2 December 1911 and was buried in the local cemetery.

== Awards ==
In 1892, Barner was honoured with the Medal of Merit.
