= Vallø Castle =

Castle in Zealand, Denmark

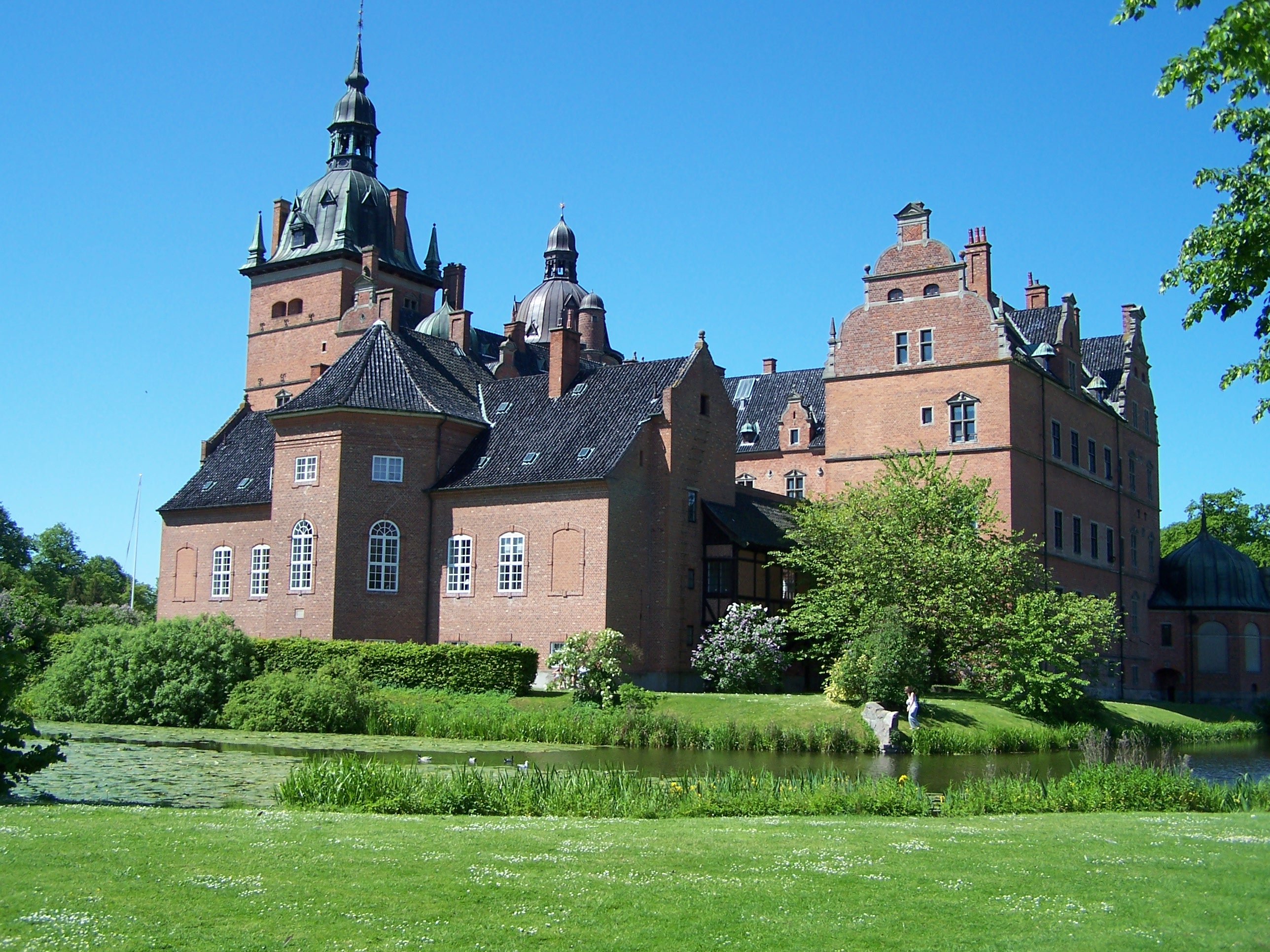
- Vallø Castle from the garden
- Interactive map of the Vallø Castle area

General information
- Location: Stevns Municipality, Denmark
- Coordinates: 55.4023°N 12.2111°E
- Construction started: 1579
- Completed: 1904

Vallø Castle (Danish: Vallø Slot) is a manor house located 7 km south of Køge, in Stevns Municipality, on the island of Zealand in Denmark. It now serves as a residence for Vallø stift, a home for unmarried, widowed and divorced women of noble descent.

== History ==
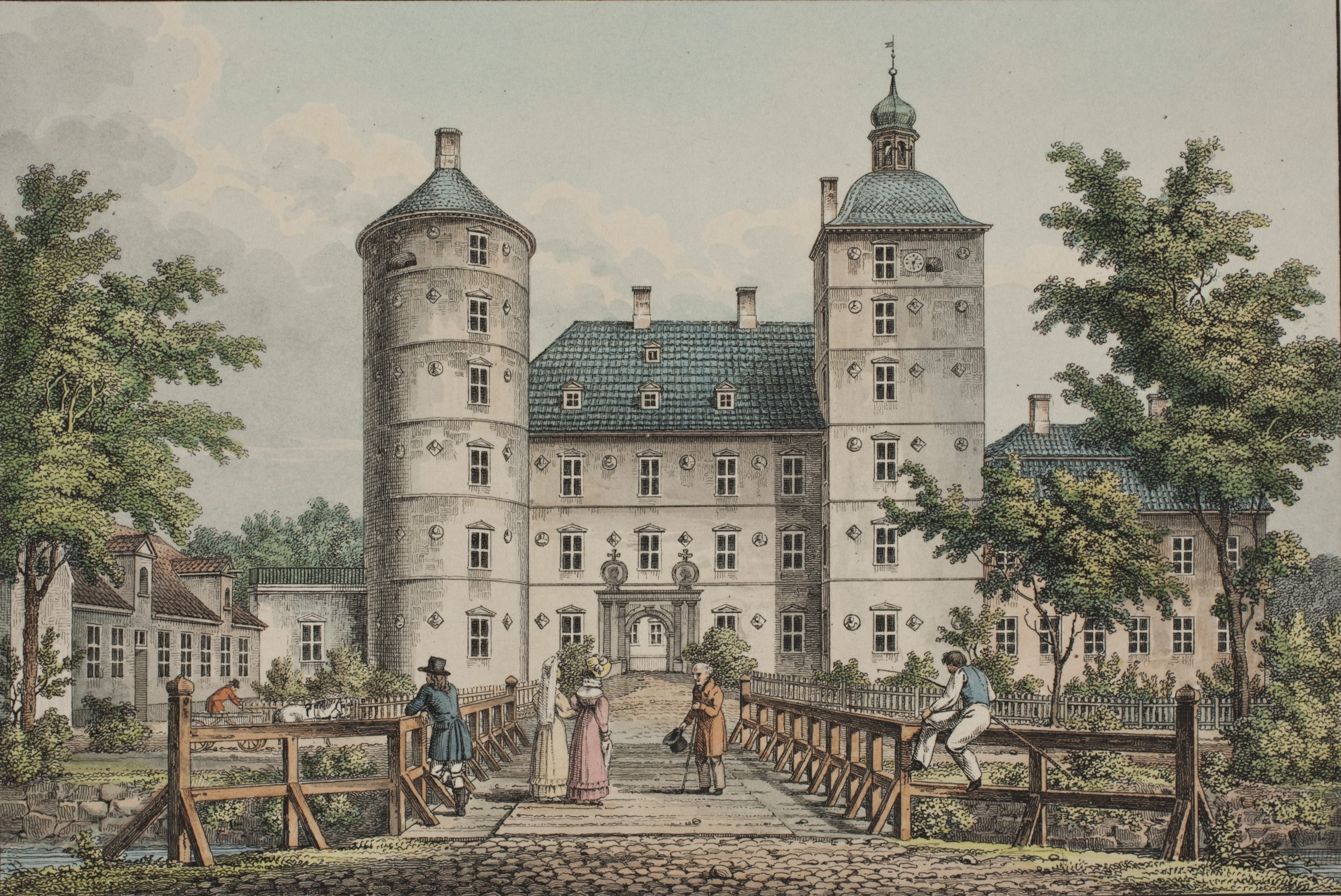
Vallø in 1839

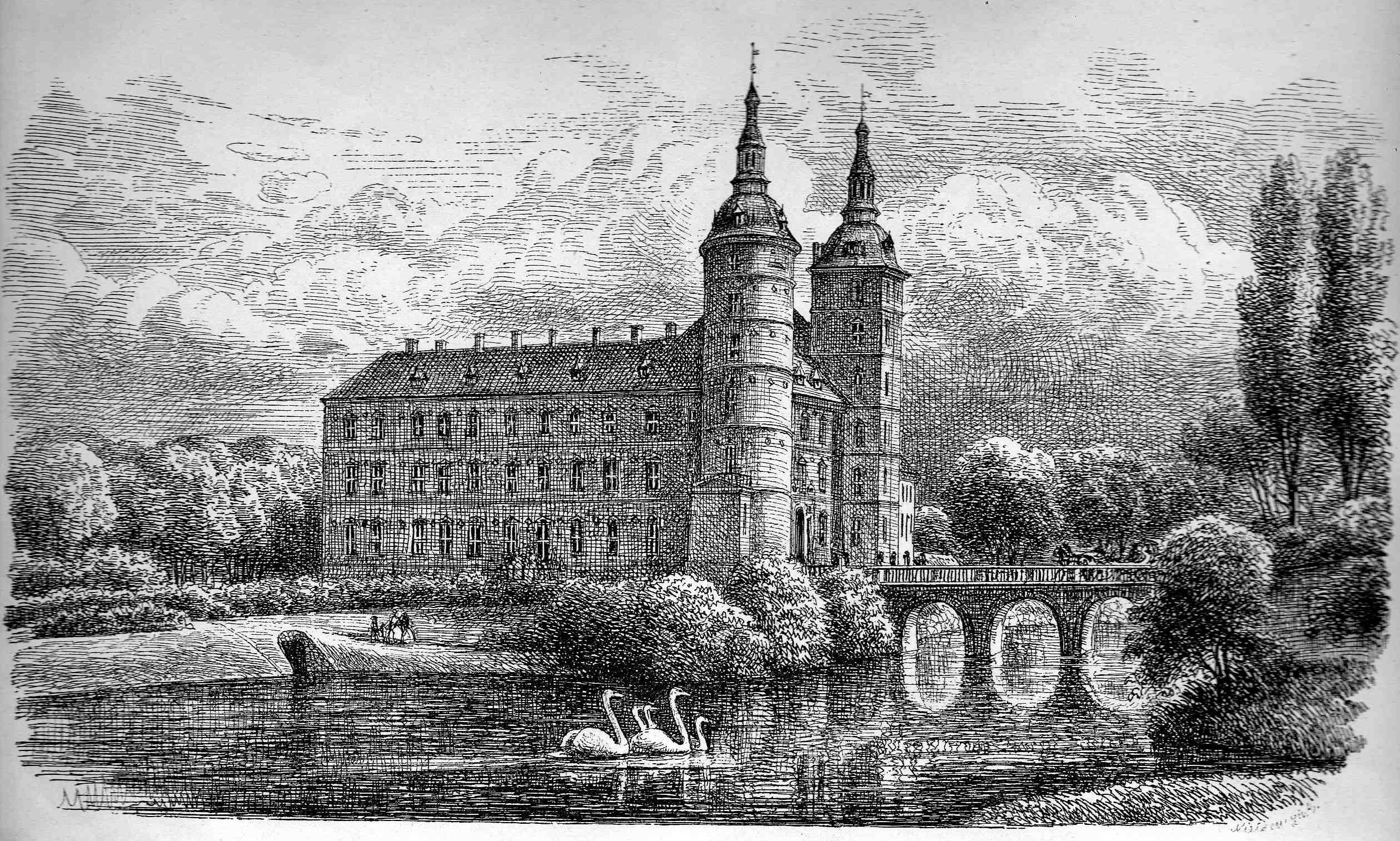
Vallø Castle in 1865

Vallø traces its history back to the 14th century. From 1554 to 1651 it was divided into two separate estates, West Vallø and East Vallø.

In 1708 Vallø was acquired by King Frederick IV who passed it on to Anne Sophie Reventlow. In 1731 King Christian VI passed the property on to Queen Sophia Magdalene who in 1737 founded the Noble Vallø Foundation for Unmarried Daughters (da. Det Adelige Stift Vallø for ugifte døtre).

== Building ==
Vallø Castle in 1900. Stereoscopic photo by Peter Elfelt.

Vallø consists of four wings with robust towers and is surrounded by a moat. The south wing, with its robust corner towers, and the south end of the west wing were built from 1580 to 1586 by Mette Rosenkrantz, one of the richest women in Denmark of her day. In Christen Skeel's time of ownership, from 1638 to 1659, the castle was expanded to three storeys and the west wing extended. The north wing was built by Johan Cornelius Krieger in 1721.

A three-winged building designed by Lauritz de Thurah was built in the courtyard from 1735 to 1738. The surviving central wing expanded with an extra storey by Georg David Anthon in 1765.

The castle was devastated by fire in 1893 but restored largely to its old design by Hans Jørgen Holm between 1893 and 1904.

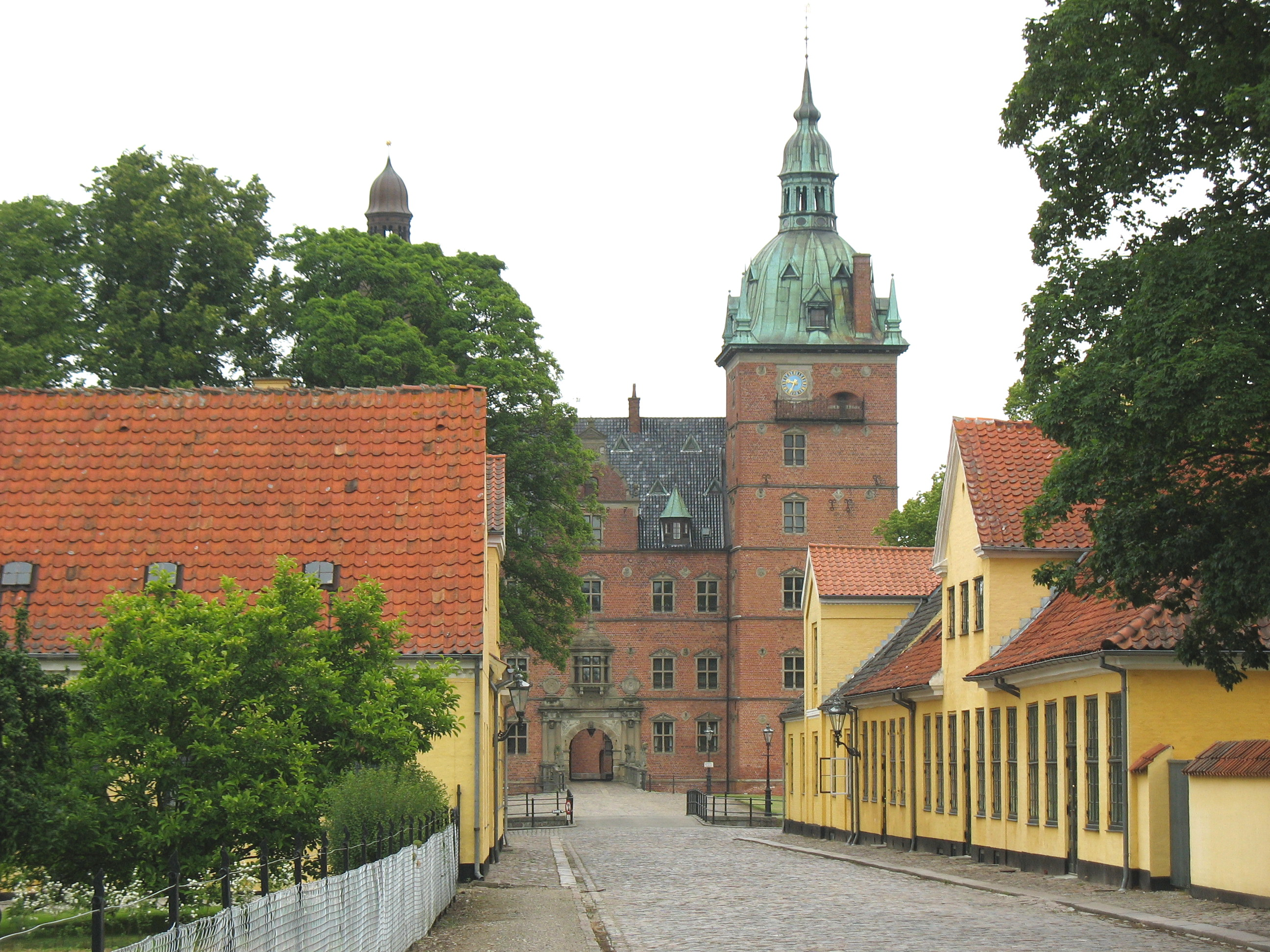
Vallø Castle Street

== Park and surroundings ==
The park was turned into a Romantic landscape garden in 1830 but retains elements from the former French gardens from the 1720s. I large flower park was founded in 1960 but it has later been disbanded.

Next to castle and its park there is a cluster of historic houses arranged around a street known as Vallø Castle Street (da. Vallø Slotsgade). Vallø Castle Inn received a royal privilege in 1784. The estate also owns a variety of other houses spread out across the surrounding countryside.

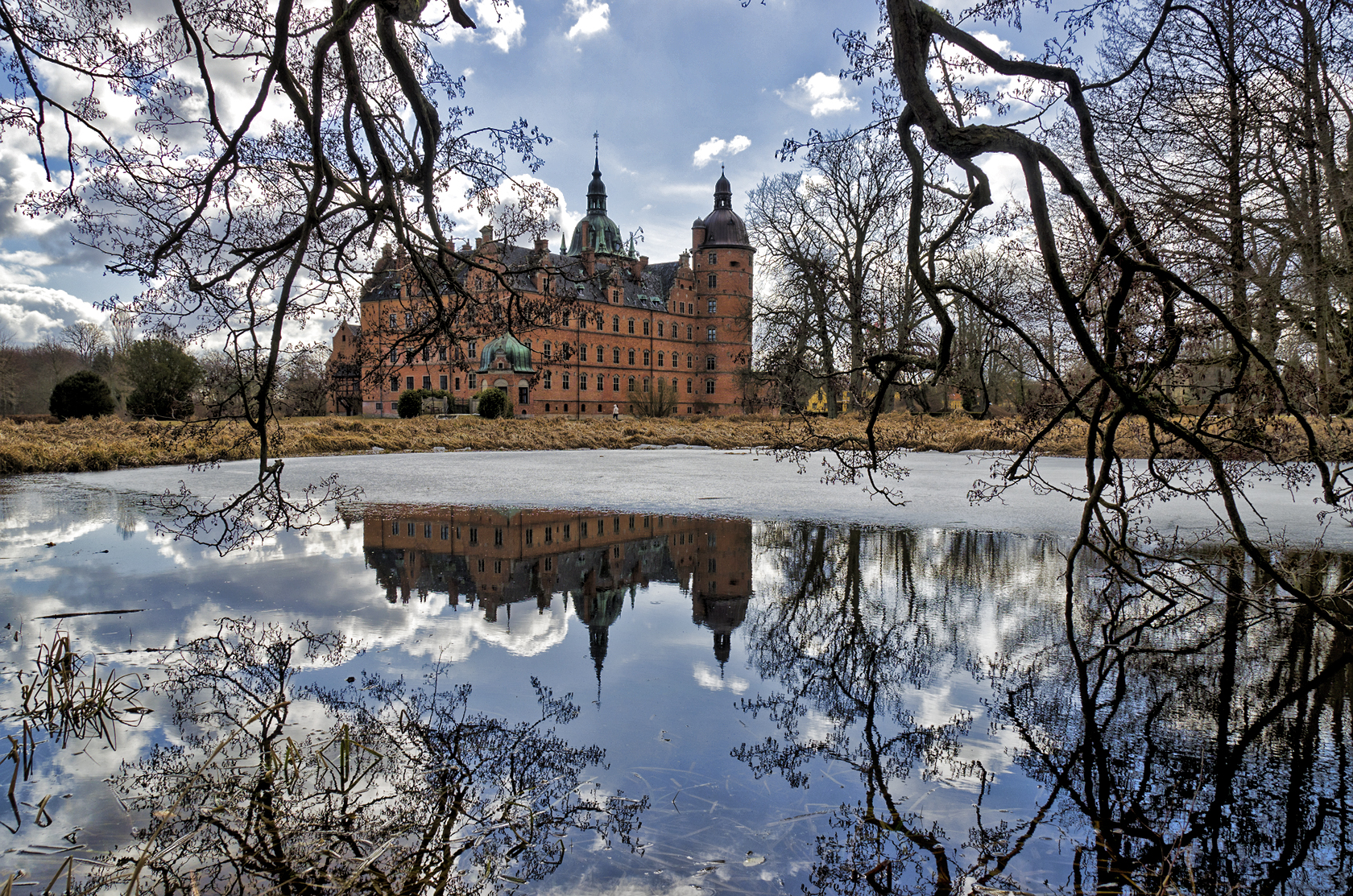
Vallø Castle in winter

== Vallø today ==
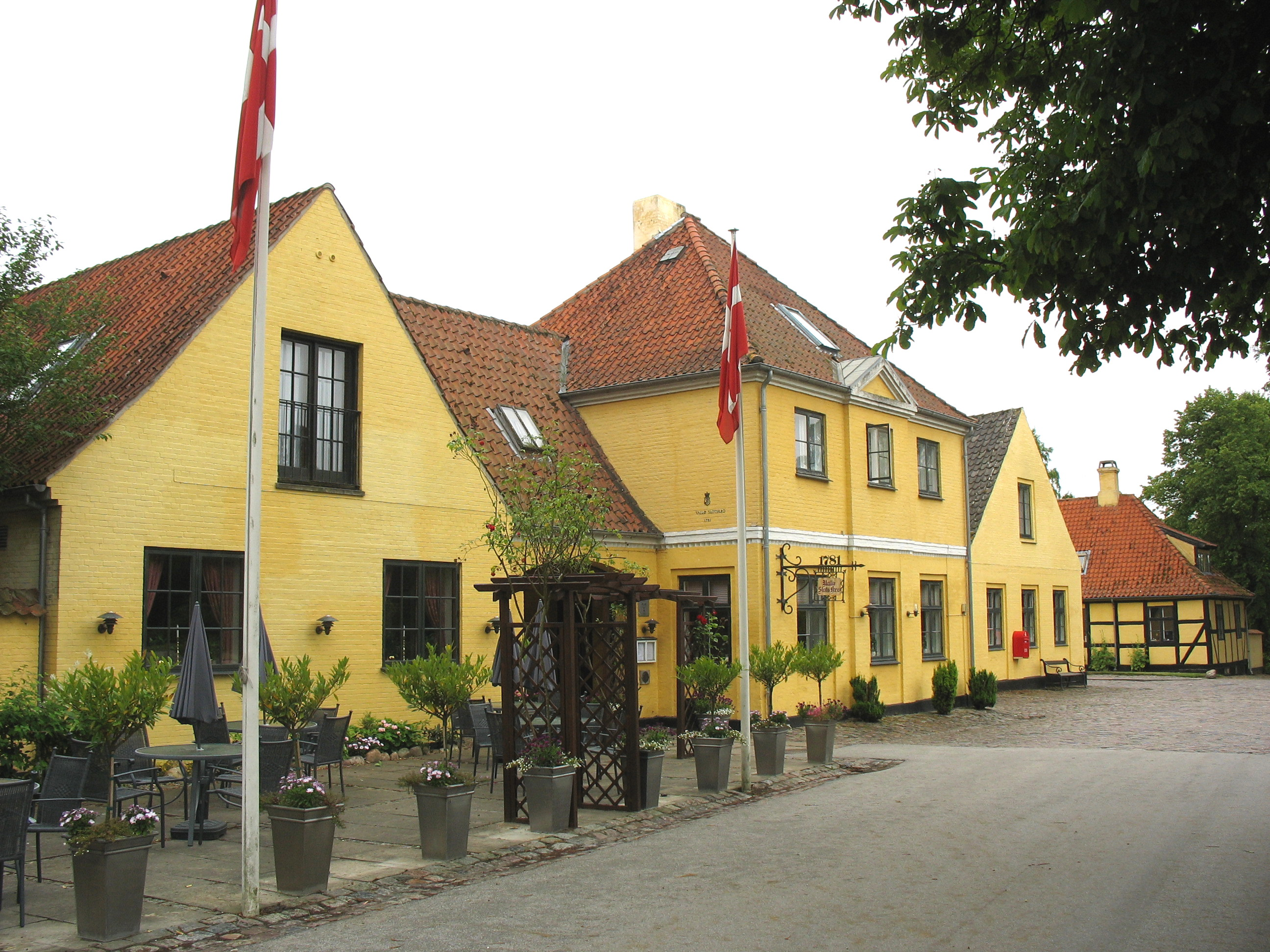
Vallø Castle Inn

The estate is still owned by the Vallø Foundation (da. Vallø Stift) and covers 4,109 hectares of land of which 1,860 hectares are woodlands. Apart from agriculture and forestry, the revenues derive from house rental, the inn, a campground located close to Køge, and hiring-out of hunting areas,

The castle still provides housing for women of the Danish nobility but since 1976 admission to the residences is not restricted to unmarried women but now also cover widows and divorced women.

== Churchyard ==
Vallø Stift has its own churchyard. Burials include:

- Sophia Magdalena of Denmark (1635–1719), Danish princess
- Regitze Barner (1834–1911), writer and philanthropist
- August Villads Bech (1879–1953), landowner
- Frederik Moltke (1754–1836), politician
- Johanne Svanenskjold (1768–1875), writer, schoolmaster and missionary
- Elisabeth Wedell-Wedellsborg (1830–1920, noblewoman and writer

== Cultural references ==
- Vallø was used as a location in the 1965 drama fulm Gertrud.
- Vallø is also used as the eponymous castle in the 1989 comedy film The Egborg Girl.
- Vallø is also used as location for the scenes at the fictional Borreholm Castle in the 1978 Olsen-banden film The Olsen Gang Sees Red.
- Vallø has also been used as a location in the Tv2 television series Badehotellet.

== List of owners ==
- ( - ) Eskild Falk Krage
- ( - ) Bo Eskildsen Falk
- ( -1387) Eskild Bosen Falk
- (1387- ) Christine Evertsdatter Moltke, gift Krage
- ( - ) Jens Eskildsen Falk
- ( -1421) Hans Henningsen Podebusk
- ( -1464) Oluf Axelsen Thott
- (1421- ) Axel Pedersen Thott
- (1464-1484) Birgitte Olufsdatter Thott, gift Rosenkrantz
- (1467-1522) Kronen
- (1484-1516) Niels Eriksen Rosenkrantz
- (1522-1528) Birgitte Olufsdatter Thott, gift Rosenkrantz
- (1528-1545) Oluf Nielsen Rosenkrantz
- (1545-1554) Ida Munk Lange, gift Rosenkrantz

== See also ==
- Gunderup, Køge Municipality
