= Vallø stift =

Coordinates: 55.3986°N 12.2130°E

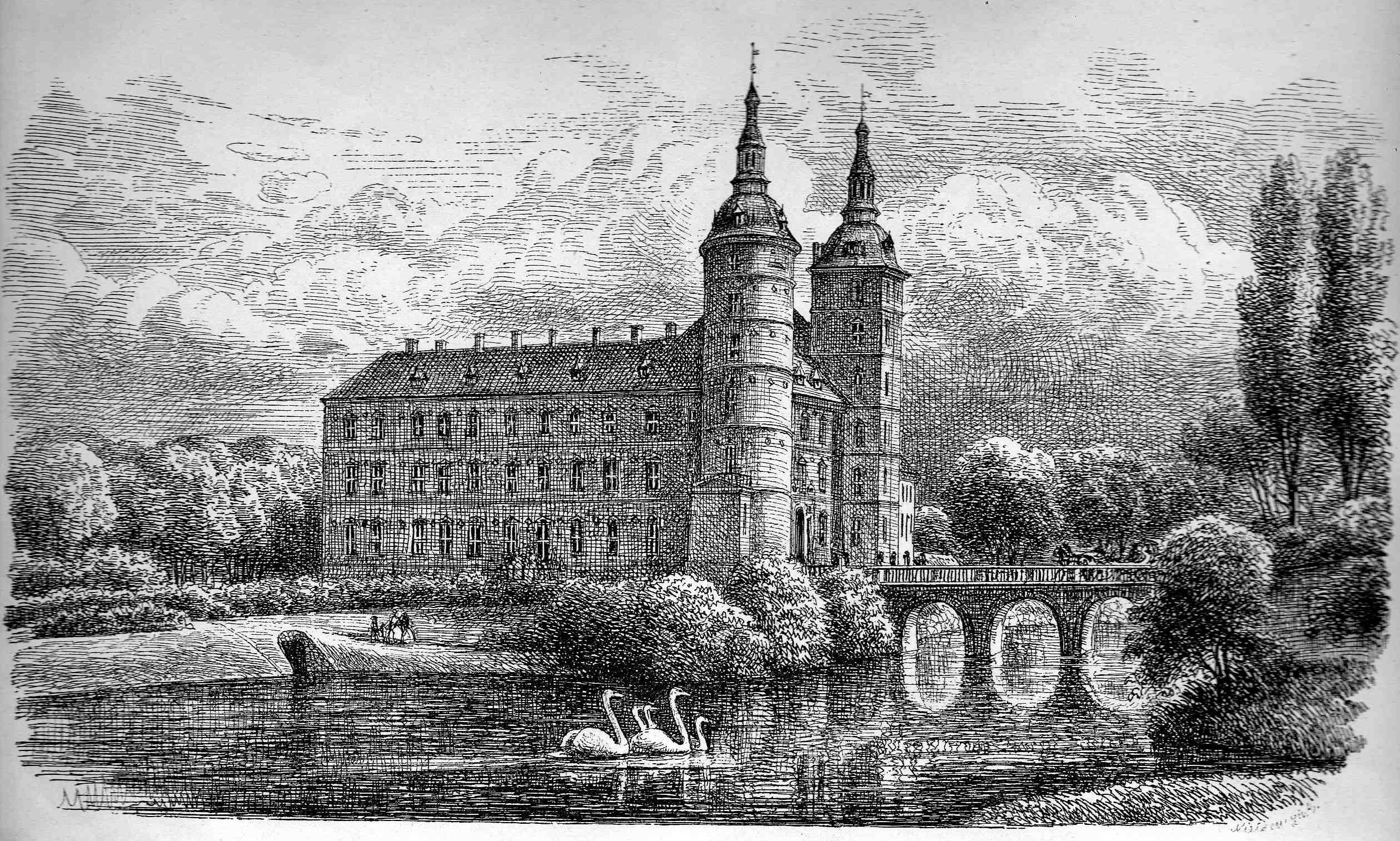
Vallø Castle in 1865

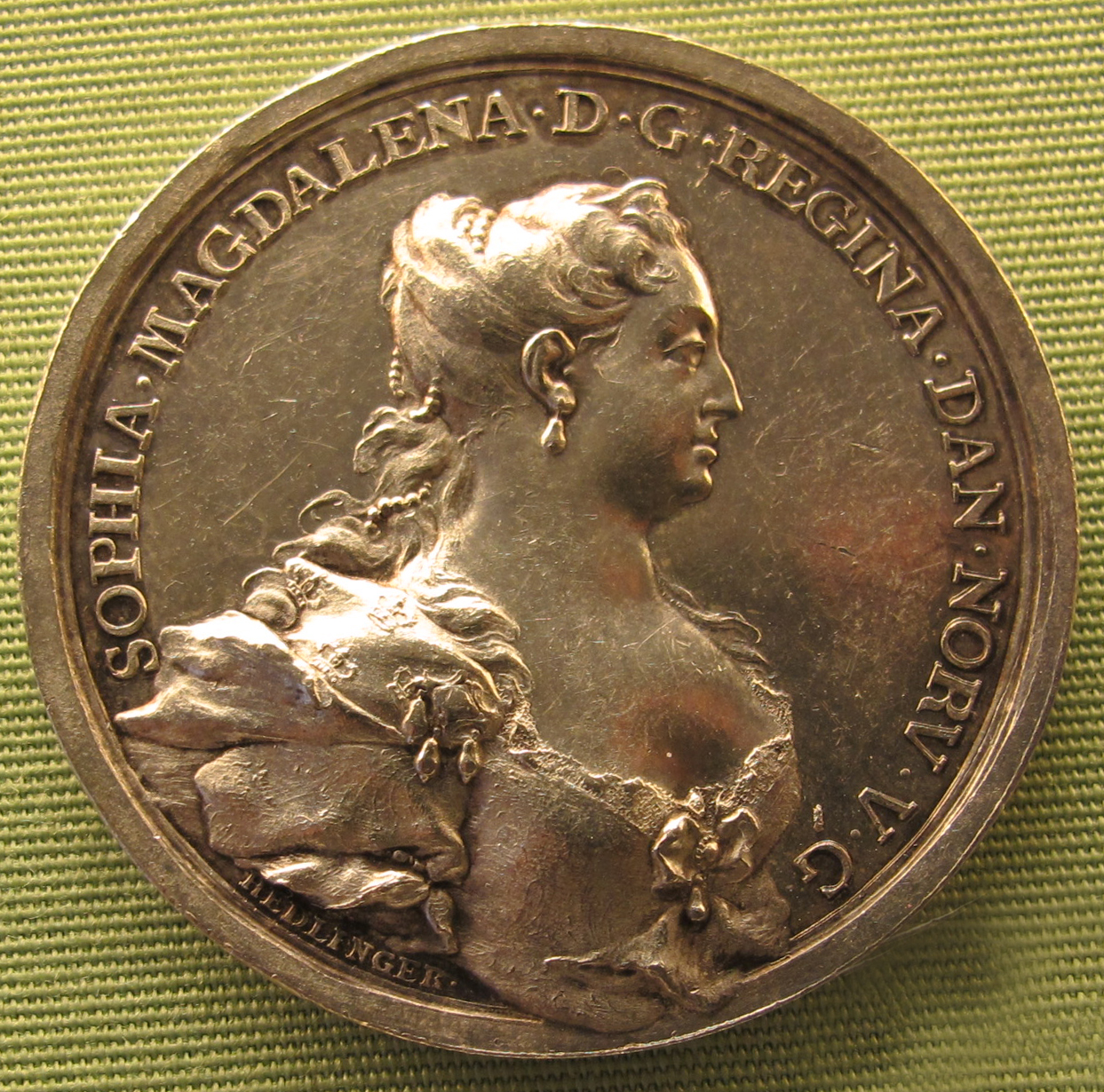
Vallø stift was founded by Queen Sophie Magdalene

Vallø stift or Det Adelige Stift Vallø for ugifte døtre (Noble Vallø Foundation for Unmarried Daughters) was a Danish foundation for the support of unmarried female nobles. It was located at Vallø Castle just south of Køge on the east coast of the island of Zealand.

== History ==
Vallø Stift Foundation (Stiftelsen Vallø Stift) was created in 1737 by Queen Sophie Magdalene (1700-1770). The convent was inaugurated the following year. It functioned as a convent for unmarried women from noble or princely houses, who resided at Vallø Castle. For this purpose, Vallø Castle was expanded between 1736-38 with a new baroque-style building designed by architect Lauritz de Thurah (1706–1759).

Until 1810, the convent was headed by an abbess, who were to be of a princely house. Initially the abbess was Sophie Caroline of Brandenburg-Kulmbach (1705–1764) who was a younger sister of Queen Sophie Magdalene. The abbess had the right to appoint the vicars in the parishes belonging to the county of the stift. She was assisted by a prioress with the title dekanesse. In 1810 the office of abbey was abolished, and the dean became head of the foundation.

The activities of the foundation changed after the end of World War II. In 1976, the foundation's bylaws were revised so that no more new ladies of the diocese were to be enrolled, but noble widows who were already registered could get free housing in the castle. New ladies were enrolled again from 2003.
