= Holstein-Glückstadt =

Coordinates: 53.786°N 9.418°E

Holstein-Glückstadt or Schleswig-Holstein-Glückstadt (1544–1773) is the historiographical name, as well as contemporary shorthand name, for the parts of the duchies of Schleswig and Holstein that were ruled by the Kings of Denmark in their function as dukes of Schleswig and Holstein, thus also known as Royal Schleswig-Holstein. Other parts of the duchies were ruled by the Dukes of Schleswig-Holstein-Gottorp. The territories of Holstein-Glückstadt are located in present-day Denmark and Germany. The main centre of administration was Segeberg and from 1648 Glückstadt (founded in 1617) on the River Elbe.

== History ==
After the death of Frederick I of Denmark (who was also Duke of Schleswig and Holstein) his three sons partitioned the Duchies between them in 1544 whereby each of the three brothers received a part of both duchies:

- The Duchy of Schleswig-Holstein in Segeberg, held by King Christian III of Denmark and his successors, identical with the Kings of Denmark. From 1648 the royal parts of Schleswig and Holstein were administered out of Glückstadt, known as the Duchy of Schleswig-Holstein-Glückstadt. Before 1773 its Holstein territory consisted of the following Ämter: Rendsburg, Southern Dithmarschen, Steinburg, Segeberg, and Plön.
- The Duchy of Schleswig-Holstein in Haderslev, held by Duke Hans the Elder. Hans had no issue and after his death in 1580, his territories were divided among his brothers.
- The Duchy of Schleswig-Holstein in Gottorp, held by Duke Adolf and his successors.

In addition, significant parts of Holstein were jointly administered by the Dukes of Holstein-Glückstadt and the Dukes of Holstein-Gottorp, mainly on the Baltic Sea coast.

In 1640, the County of Holstein-Pinneberg, whose ruling house was extinct, was merged into the royal part of the Duchy of Holstein.

In 1713, the estates of the Dukes of Schleswig-Holstein-Gottorp in Schleswig including Schloss Gottorf were conquered by royal Danish troops in the course of the Great Northern War and in the 1720 Treaty of Frederiksborg, Duke Charles Frederick of Schleswig-Holstein-Gottorp had to cede them to his liege lord the Danish crown.

His remaining territories in Holstein formed the Duchy of Holstein-Gottorp administered from Kiel. In 1773, Charles Frederick's grandson, Paul, Emperor of Russia finally gave his Holstein parts to the Danish king, in his function as duke of Holstein, in exchange for the County of Oldenburg and Holstein was reunited as a single state.

== List of statholders in Schleswig-Holstein-Glückstadt ==
The Danish king in his function as duke of Holstein, and duke of Schleswig, appointed statholders (German: Statthalter; Latin: produx) to represent him in the duchies. The statholders fulfilled the tasks related to the ducal power as patrimonial lords in the royal shares of Holstein and Schleswig, as well as the royal part in the condominial government with the houses of Gottorp and Haderslev (the latter extinct in 1580) for all the duchies of Holstein (until retreat of Gottorp in 1773) and Schleswig (until Gottorp's deposal from dukedom there in 1720).

- 1545–1550: Johan Rantzau
- 1550–1556: Count Bertram von Ahlefeldt
- 1556–1598: Heinrich Rantzau
- 1598–1600: vacancy?
- 1600–1627: Geerd Rantzau (1558–1627)
- 1627–1647: vacancy
- 1647–1648: Prince Frederick of Denmark
- 1648–1663: Christian zu Rantzau
- 1663–1685: Friedrich von Ahlefeldt, Count of Langeland (1623–1686), vice-statholder since 1660
- 1685–1697: Detlev zu Rantzau (1644-1697)
- 1697–1708: Friedrich von Ahlefeldt, Count of Langeland (1662–1708), vice-statholder since 1686
- 1708–1722: Carl von Ahlefeldt, Count of Langeland (1708–1722)
- 1722–1730: ?
- 1730–1731: Margrave Charles Augustus of Brandenburg-Kulmbach (1663–1731), uncle of the next
- 1731–1762: Margrave Frederick Ernest of Brandenburg-Kulmbach (1703–1762), brother-in-law of King Christian VI
- 1762–1768: Count Friedrich Ludwig von Ahlefeldt-Dehn (1697–1771)
- 1768–1773: Prince Charles of Hesse-Kassel

== See also ==
- List of Danish monarchs
