= Sophie Caroline of Brandenburg-Kulmbach =

- Princess consort of Ostfriesland
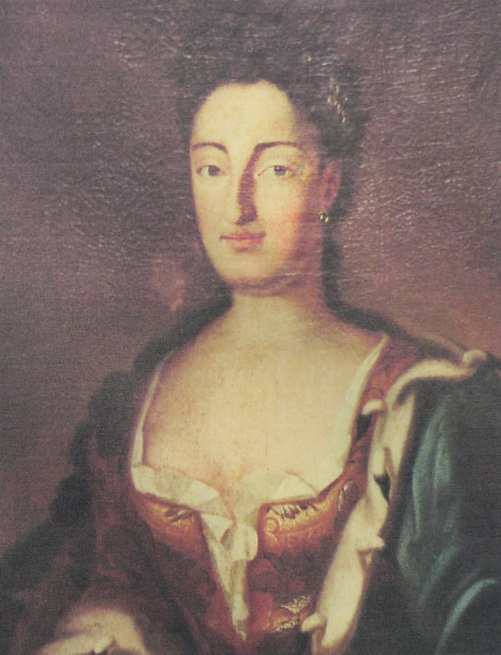
- Sophie Caroline of Brandenburg-Kulmbach

Princess consort of East Frisia
- Reign: 8 December 1723 – 11 June 1734
- Predecessor: Christine Louise of Nassau-Idstein
- Successor: Sophie Wilhelmine of Brandenburg-Bayreuth
- Born: 31 March 1705; Weferlingen
- Died: 7 June 1764 (aged 59); Copenhagen
- Spouse: Prince George Albert of East Frisia
- House: House of Hohenzollern
- Father: Christian Heinrich of Brandenburg-Bayreuth-Kulmbach
- Mother: Sophie Christiane of Wolfstein

Sophie Caroline of Brandenburg-Kulmbach (31 March 1705 – 7 June 1764) was a princess consort of Ostfriesland as the spouse of Prince George Albert of East Frisia (1690–1734).

== Biography ==
She was a daughter of Christian Heinrich of Brandenburg-Bayreuth-Kulmbach and his wife, Sophie Christiane of Wolfstein. She was married in 1723 with Prince George Albert of East Frisia.

In 1734, she became a widow, and in 1735, she was invited to Denmark by king Christian VI of Denmark, who was married to her sister, Sophia Magdalen of Brandenburg-Kulmbach. She lived permanently at the Danish court after 1740 until her death. She was described as a charming beauty, and her sister, the queen, was said to be jealous of her: it was widely believed, that she and her brother-in-law the king had an affair, but this has never been confirmed. In 1766, these rumours led to a case were a woman, Anna Sophie Magdalene Frederikke Ulrikke, demanded a pension with the claim to be the daughter of Sophie Caroline and Christian.

== Ancestry ==
Ancestors of Sophie Caroline of Brandenburg-Kulmbach

16. John George, Elector of Brandenburg
8. Christian, Margrave of Brandenburg-Bayreuth
17. Princess Elisabeth of Anhalt-Zerbst
4. Georg Albrecht, Margrave of Brandenburg-Bayreuth-Kulmbach
18. Albert Frederick, Duke of Prussia
9. Duchess Marie of Prussia
19. Duchess Marie Eleonore of Cleves
2. Christian Heinrich, Margrave of Brandenburg-Bayreuth-Kulmbach
20. John II, Duke of Schleswig-Holstein-Sonderburg
10. Philipp, Duke of Schleswig-Holstein-Sonderburg-Norburg
21. Duchess Elisabeth of Brunswick-Grubenhagen
5. Princess Marie Elisabeth of Schleswig-Holstein-Glücksburg
22. Francis II, Duke of Saxe-Lauenburg
11. Princess Sophie Hedwig of Saxe-Lauenburg
23. Duchess Marie of Brunswick-Lüneburg
1. Sophia Caroline of Brandenburg-Kulmbach
24. Johann Adam, Count of Wolfstein
12. Johann Friedrich, Count of Wolfstein
25. Countess Elisabeth of Limpurg-Speckfeld
6. Albrecht Friedrich, Count of Wolfstein
26. Georg, Baron Teufel von Guntersdorf
13. Baroness Barbara Teufel von Guntersdorf
27. Elisabeth von Puchheim
3. Countess Sophie Christiane of Wolfstein
28. Wolfgang II, Count of Castell-Remlingen
14. Wolfgang Georg I, Count of Castell-Remlingen
29. Countess Juliana of Hohenlohe-Weikersheim
7. Countess Sophie Luise of Castell-Remlingen
30. Ludwig Eberhard, Count of Hohenlohe-Waldenburg-Pfedelbach and Gleichen
15. Countess Sophie Juliana of Hohenlohe-Waldenburg-Pfedelbach
31. Countess Dorothea of Erbach

Vacant Title last held by Christiane Louise of Nassau-Wiesbaden-Idstein	Princess of East Frisia; 1723–1734	Vacant Title next held by Sophie Wilhelmine of Brandenburg-Kulmbach-Bayreuth
