= Anna Sophie Magdalene Frederikke Ulrikke =

Danish con-artist

- Born: 1730 or 1740
- Died: 22 January 1805
- Known for: Claimed to be the illegitimate daughter of King Christian VI of Denmark

Anna Sophie Magdalene Frederikke Ulrikke (born in 1730 or 1740 – died 22 January 1805) was a Danish con artist who in 1766 demanded a pension from the Danish royal house with the claim that she was the illegitimate daughter of King Christian VI of Denmark and the king's sister-in-law, the Dowager Princess of Ostefriesland, Sophie Caroline of Brandenburg-Kulmbach (1707–1764).

Sophie Caroline of Brandenburg-Kulmbach had lived at the Danish court as a widow after 1735, and it was a widespread rumour that she had a relationship with her brother-in-law. Anna's story was backed up by a Norwegian student, Kirchhof, who was her lover. In 1770, a commission was organized to examine the case. After it was discovered, that Anna had been a prostitute in Amsterdam, her claim was deemed false, and she was placed in Mons Chastity House. She was later released for good behaviour and given a pension of $100. Her date of birth is given as either 1730 or as 1740. If it were 1730, she could not have been the daughter of Christian VI of Denmark and Sophie Caroline of Brandenburg-Kulmbach, as the latter did not live at the Danish court until 1735.

== See also ==
- Helga de la Brache
