= Wolfstein Castle =

- Schloss Wolfstein
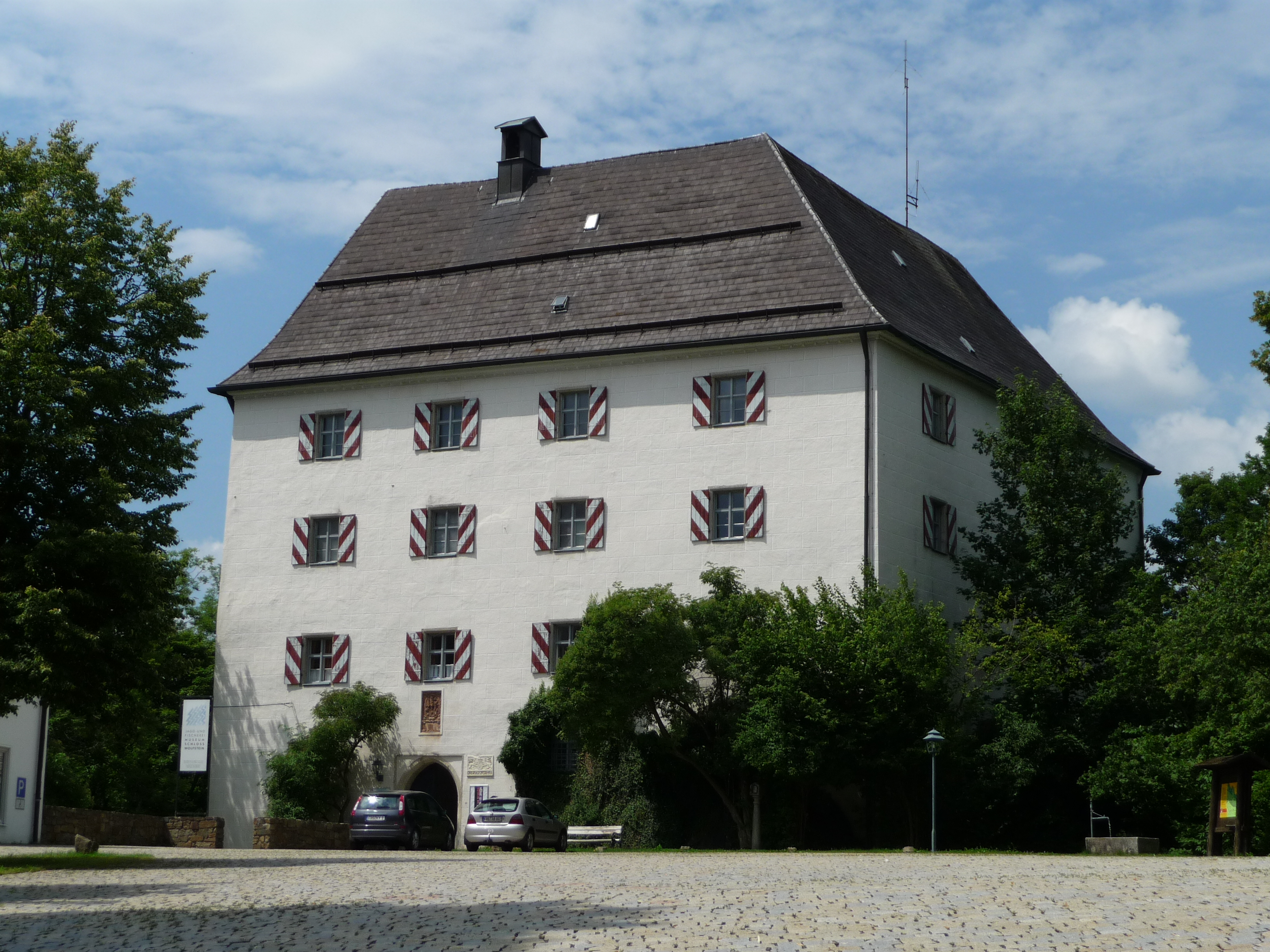
- Schloss Wolfstein in Freyung

Site information
- Code: DE-BY

Location
- Coordinates: 48°48′46″N 13°32′34″E
- Height: 650 m above sea level (NN)

Site history
- Built: 12th century

Wolfstein Castle or Schloss Wolfstein is a schloss and former castle in Freyung in Lower Bavaria. It gave its name to the county of Wolfstein which was dissolved in 1972.

== Location ==
The schloss lies northwest of the town centre of Freyung on a rocky crag surrounded on three sides by the Saußbach river.

== History ==
Wolfstein Castle was built as a fortification by the Bishop of Passau, Wolfger von Erla, around 1200. Before that, the surrounding land had been ceded to the bishops of Passau by Emperor Henry VI in 1193. In 1301, a place is first mentioned in a document as Purchstol zu Wolferstein und ein Wald dazu, later Freyung. The castle itself served as a fortification, administrative base and episcopal hunting lodge. When the Prince-Bishopric of Passau was dissolved in 1803, Wolfstein was initially annexed by Austria. Three years later, the area went to the Kingdom of Bavaria after the Treaty of Pressburg. In 1806, the Bavarian Landgerichtsbezirk of Wolfstein was established with its headquarters at Schloss Wolfstein in the municipality (Landgemeinde) of Ort. It belonged to the Lower Danube Circle (which became Lower Bavaria in 1838). In 1862, the new Landgerichtsbezirk of Waldkirchen was established from municipalities of the Landgerichtsbezirke of Wolfstein and Wegscheid and the former Landgericht of Wolfstein was renamed to the Landgericht of Freyung. Both Landgerichtsbezirke belonged to the Bezirksamt of Wolfstein. In 1938, the Bezirke were renamed Landkreise. Since the incorporation of the municipality of Ort on 1 April 1954, Wolfstein Castle has stood on the territory of the town of Freyung. In 1972 the county of Wolfstein was dissolved.

== Present day ==
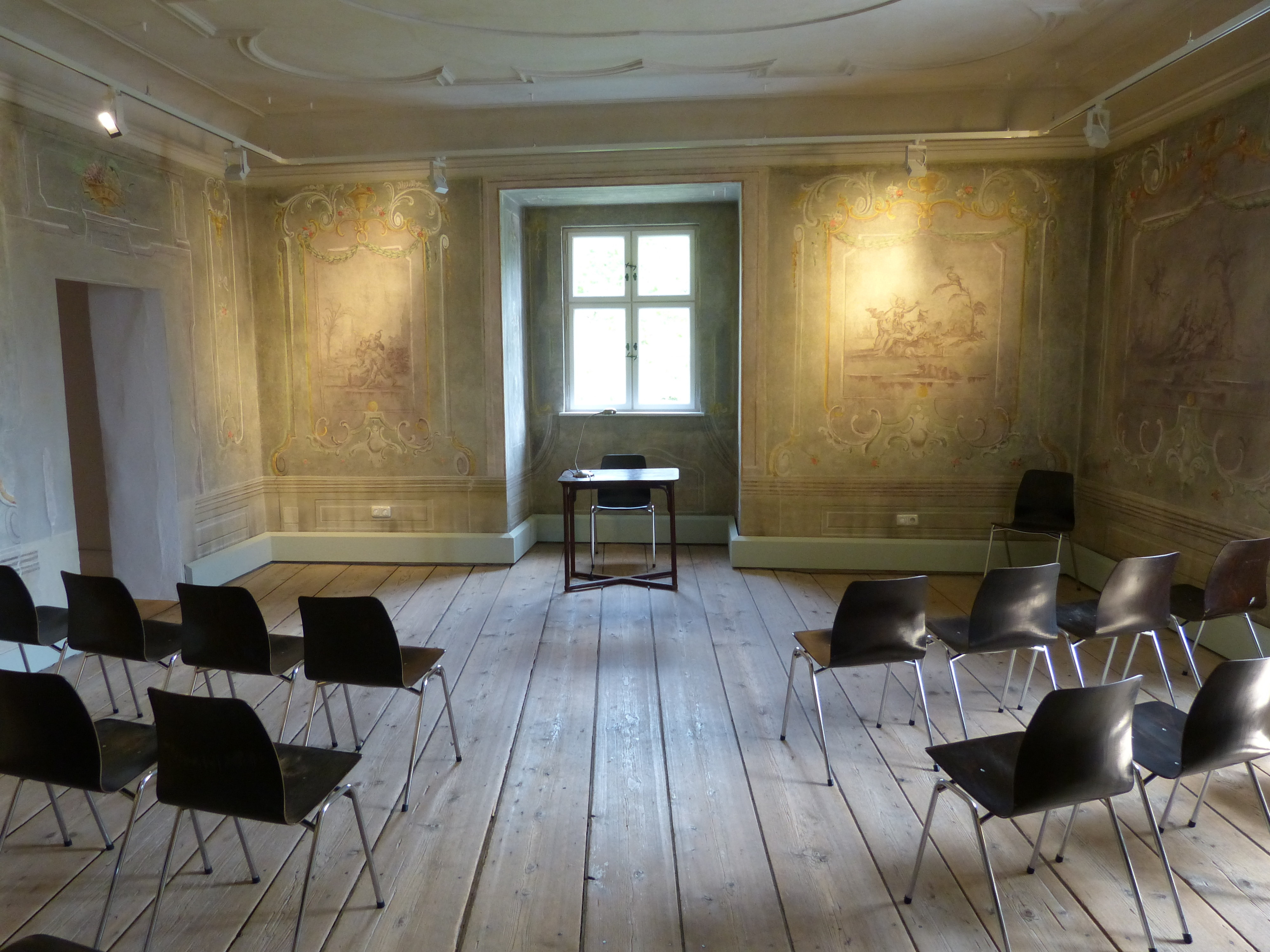
Prince's Room

The schloss ensemble includes a mighty tower house, built between 1199 and 1204 and 1590, two low wings with arcades, dating to the late 16th and early 17th century, and the castle wall with closed quadrangular courtyard. Since 1982 it has housed the county art collection, Galerie Wolfstein, with its collection of contemporary art from Eastern Bavaria; since 1989 it has also been home to the Hunting and Fishing Museum (Jagd- und Fischereimuseum) of the county. This was redesigned and reopened in 2014 under the name Jagd Land Fluss ("Hunt Country River"). Directly in front of the castle is are the council offices for Freyung-Grafenau.

== Literature ==
- Peter Dillinger: Schloss Wolfstein. Von einer Schutzburg zur Kunstgalerie. In: Der Bayerwald. 101, 2, 2009, ISSN 0405-0851, pp. 13–18.
- Paul Praxl: Die Geschichte des Schlosses Wolfstein. s. n., Freyung, 1991.
