= Hohenaspe =

- Municipality
- Coat of arms

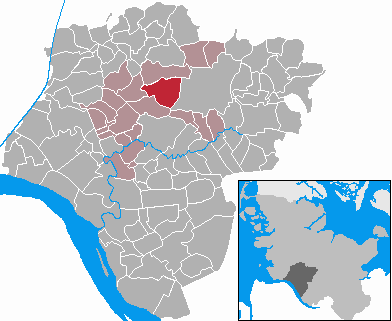
- Location of Hohenaspe within Steinburg district
- Interactive map of Hohenaspe
- Location within Germany Location within Schleswig-Holstein
- Coordinates: 53°59′N 9°32′E
- Country: Germany
- State: Schleswig-Holstein
- District: Steinburg
- Municipal assoc.: Itzehoe-Land

Government
  - Mayor: Hans-Georg Wendrich

Area
  - Total: 14.07 km^{2} (5.43 sq mi)
- Elevation: 14 m (46 ft)

Population (2025-12-31)
  - Total: 1,923
  - Density: 136.7/km^{2} (354.0/sq mi)
- Time zone: UTC+01:00 (CET)
  - Summer (DST): UTC+02:00 (CEST)
- Postal codes: 25582
- Dialling codes: 04893
- Vehicle registration: IZ
- Website: www.amtitzehoe-land.de

Hohenaspe is a municipality in the district of Steinburg, in Schleswig-Holstein, Germany.
