= Mühlhausen, Upper Palatinate =

Mühlhausen
- Municipality
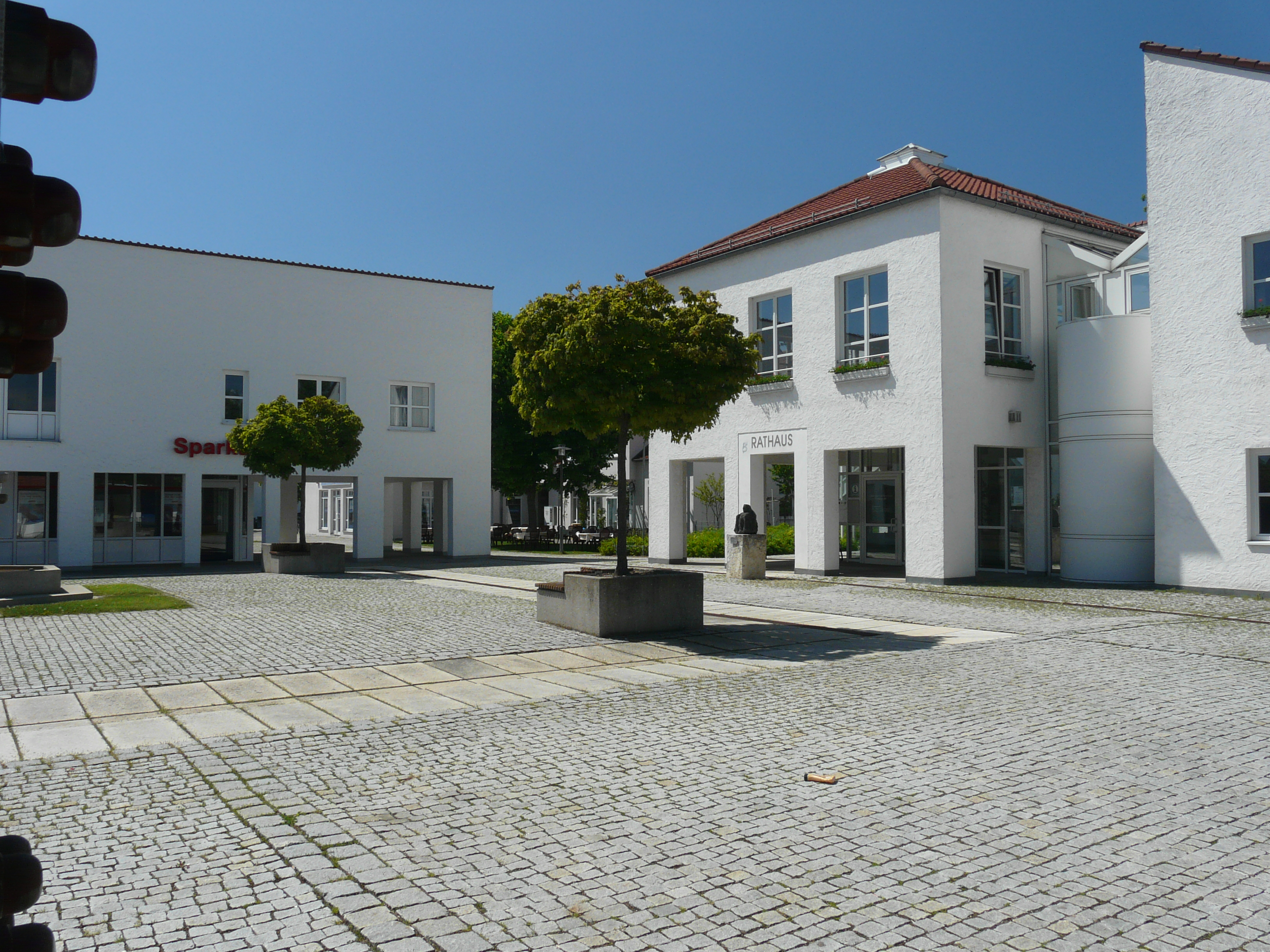
- Town hall

- Coat of arms

- Location of Mühlhausen within Neumarkt in der Oberpfalz district
- Interactive map of Mühlhausen
- Location within Germany Location within Bavaria
- Coordinates: 49°10′N 11°26′E
- Country: Germany
- State: Bavaria
- Admin. region: Oberpfalz
- District: Neumarkt in der Oberpfalz

Government
  - Mayor (2020–26): Dr. Martin Hundsdorfer (CSU)

Area
  - Total: 36.98 km^{2} (14.28 sq mi)
- Elevation: 406 m (1,332 ft)

Population (2025-12-31)
  - Total: 5,353
  - Density: 144.8/km^{2} (374.9/sq mi)
- Time zone: UTC+01:00 (CET)
  - Summer (DST): UTC+02:00 (CEST)
- Postal codes: 92360
- Dialling codes: 09185
- Vehicle registration: NM
- Website: www.muehlhausen-sulz.de

Mühlhausen (German pronunciation: [myːlˈhaʊzn̩]) is a municipality in the district of Neumarkt in Bavaria in Germany. It lies in the Sulz River valley.

The commune of Mühlhausen includes the following localities:

- Aumühle
- Bachhausen
- Belzlmühle
- Ellmannsdorf
- Gänsmühle
- Greißelbach
- Herrenau
- Hofen
- Kanalschleuse 28
- Kanalschleuse 29
- Kanalschleuse 30
- Kerkhofen
- Körnersdorf
- Kruppach
- Mühlhausen
- Reismühle
- Rocksdorf
- Sandmühle
- Sulzbürg
- Wangen
- Wappersdorf-Kirchdorf
- Wappersdorf-Siedlung
- Weihersdorf
- Wettenhofen

== History ==
In 1888 Mühlhausen became a railway station on the route Neumarkt in der Oberpfalz - Beilngries. Deutsche Bahn stopped the route step by step from 1987 till 1991.

After World War II, a large number of refugees and expellees from the Sudetenland Egerland, Silesia and other former German settlement areas settled in Mühlhausen and caused a population increase.
