= Drage, Steinburg =

Drage
- Municipality
- Coat of arms

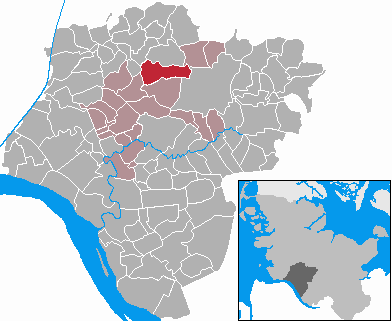
- Location of Drage within Steinburg district
- Interactive map of Drage
- Location within Germany Location within Schleswig-Holstein
- Coordinates: 54°0′N 9°31′E
- Country: Germany
- State: Schleswig-Holstein
- District: Steinburg
- Municipal assoc.: Itzehoe-Land

Government
  - Mayor: Bernd Tiedemann

Area
  - Total: 13.56 km^{2} (5.24 sq mi)
- Elevation: 14 m (46 ft)

Population (2025-12-31)
  - Total: 223
  - Density: 16.4/km^{2} (42.6/sq mi)
- Time zone: UTC+01:00 (CET)
  - Summer (DST): UTC+02:00 (CEST)
- Postal codes: 25582
- Dialling codes: 04893
- Vehicle registration: IZ
- Website: www.amtitzehoe- land.de

Drage (German pronunciation: [ˈdʁaːɡə]) is a municipality in the district of Steinburg, in Schleswig-Holstein, Germany.
