= Sophie Magdalene of Brandenburg-Kulmbach =

Queen of Denmark and Norway from 1730 to 1746

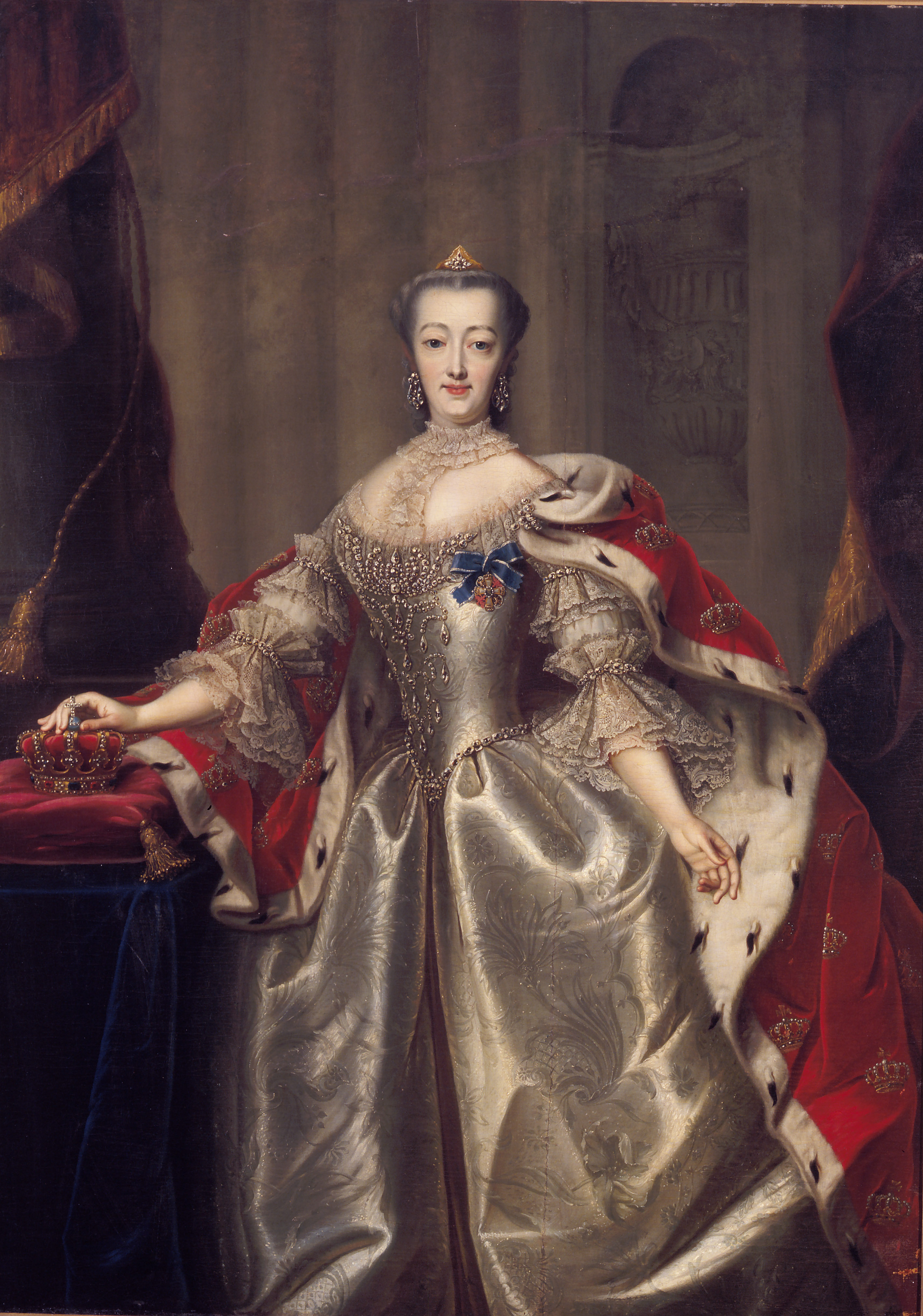
- Portrait c. 1740

Queen consort of Denmark and Norway
- Tenure: 12 October 1730 – 6 August 1746
- Coronation: 6 June 1731
- Born: 28 November 1700; Castle Schonberg, Nuremberg
- Died: 27 May 1770 (aged 69); Christiansborg Palace, Copenhagen
- Burial: Roskilde Cathedral
- Spouse: Christian VI of Denmark (m. 1721; died 1746)
- Issue: Frederick V of Denmark; Louise, Duchess of Saxe-Hildburghausen
- House: Hohenzollern
- Father: Christian Heinrich, Margrave of Brandenburg-Bayreuth-Kulmbach
- Mother: Sophie Christiane of Wolfstein

Sophie Magdalene of Brandenburg-Kulmbach (28 November 1700 – 27 May 1770) was Queen of Denmark and Norway by marriage to King Christian VI of Denmark and Norway.

== Life ==
=== Early life ===
She was born in Castle Schonberg, Bavaria, on 28 November 1700 to Christian Heinrich, Margrave of Brandenburg-Bayreuth-Kulmbach and Countess Sophie Christiane of Wolfstein. She was raised at the court of the Queen of Poland, Christiane Eberhardine of Brandenburg-Bayreuth, in Saxony.

=== Crown Princess ===
King Frederick IV of Denmark allowed his son, Crown Prince Christian, to find a suitable bride. During a trip through Europe accompanied by Chancellor Ulrik Adolf Holstein the Crown Prince met Sophie Magdalene while she was serving as lady-in-waiting of the Queen of Poland at Pretzsch Castle. She came from a small (the Margraviate of Kulmbach was not greater than Lolland-Falster), insignificant, relatively poor and large German princely family (she had 13 siblings); however, the King gave his permission. In the Crown Prince's letters he wrote that he fell for Sophie Magdalene's intense religiosity, which matched with his own beliefs. It would affect his later reign. The wedding took place on 7 August 1721 at Pretzsch Castle in Saxony.

A French envoy to the Danish court sent a description home of the 20-year-old Crown Princess:

She's a proud, impressive woman, although she is not high growth or of beautiful forms. She's not exactly pretty, but her majestic attitude was notorious. Her skin is very white, her face-range is fine, vibrant and soulful with light blue eyes; they still shaped lips crimped sometimes of a sneer. She dressed with the greatest splendor and used a lot of diamonds and other precious stones.

=== Queen Consort ===
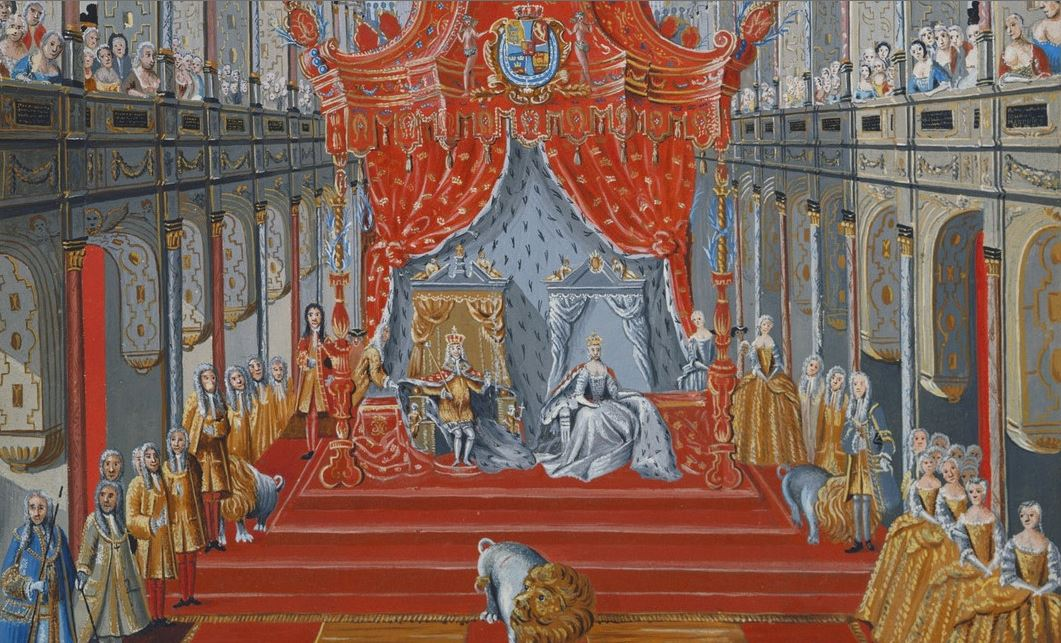
The Coronation of Christian VI and Sophie Magdalene, 1731

At the death of Frederick IV on 12 October 1730, the couple became King and Queen of Denmark and Norway. They were crowned on 6 June 1731 in the Chapel of Frederiksborg Palace. She was behind the making of a new Danish queen's crown when she refused to wear the same one that the hated Queen Anna Sophie – whom she called "that whore!" (die Hure!)– had worn. Queen Sophie Magdelene established the collection of crown jewels when she bequeathed a large part of her jewelry for that purpose. This includes the emeralds given to Sophie by King Christian VI upon the birth of the future Frederik V.

External videos
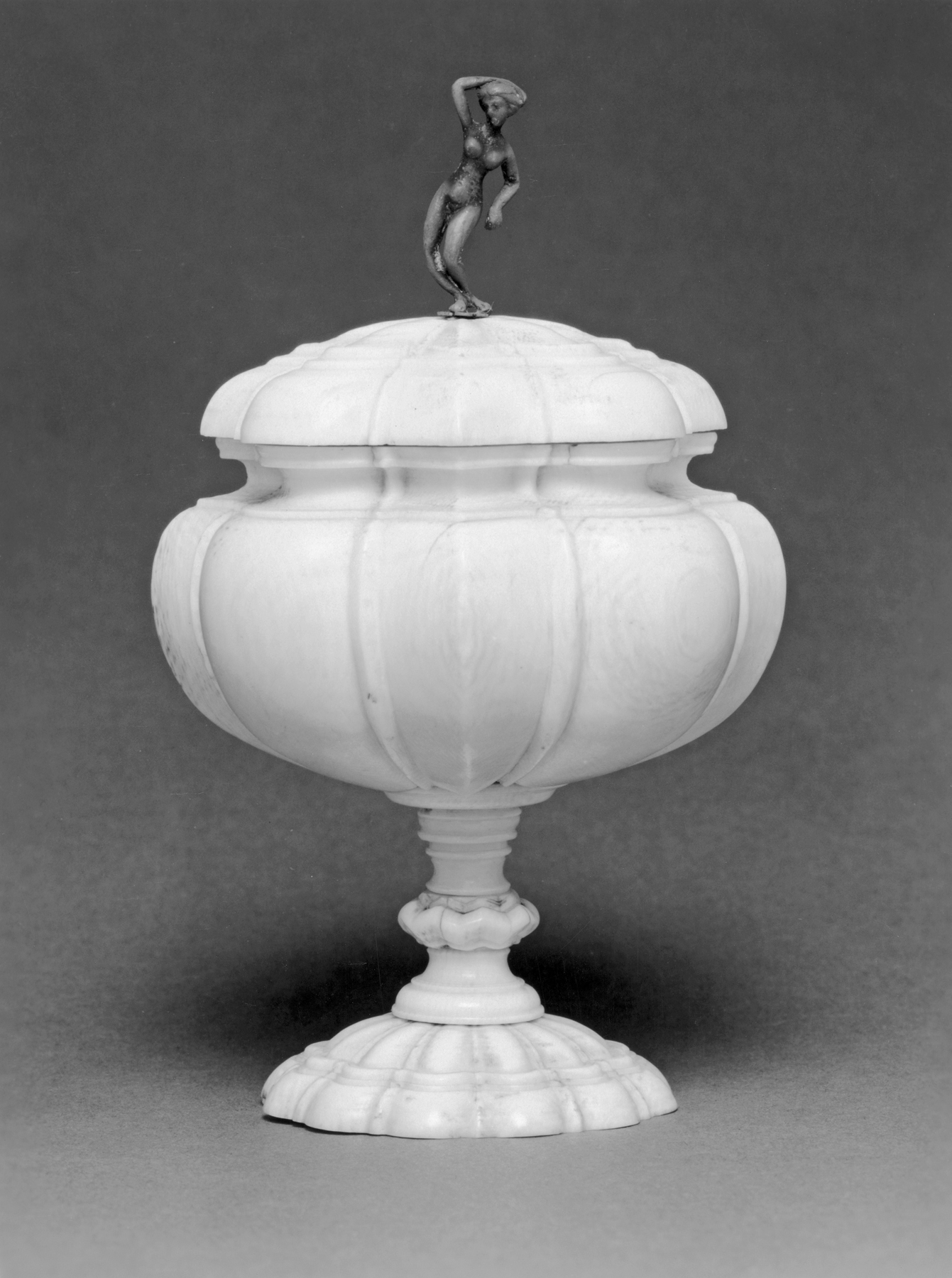
- The Royal Lathe, Sophie... like other queens of her day, devoted much of her time turning items of ivory or precious woods.

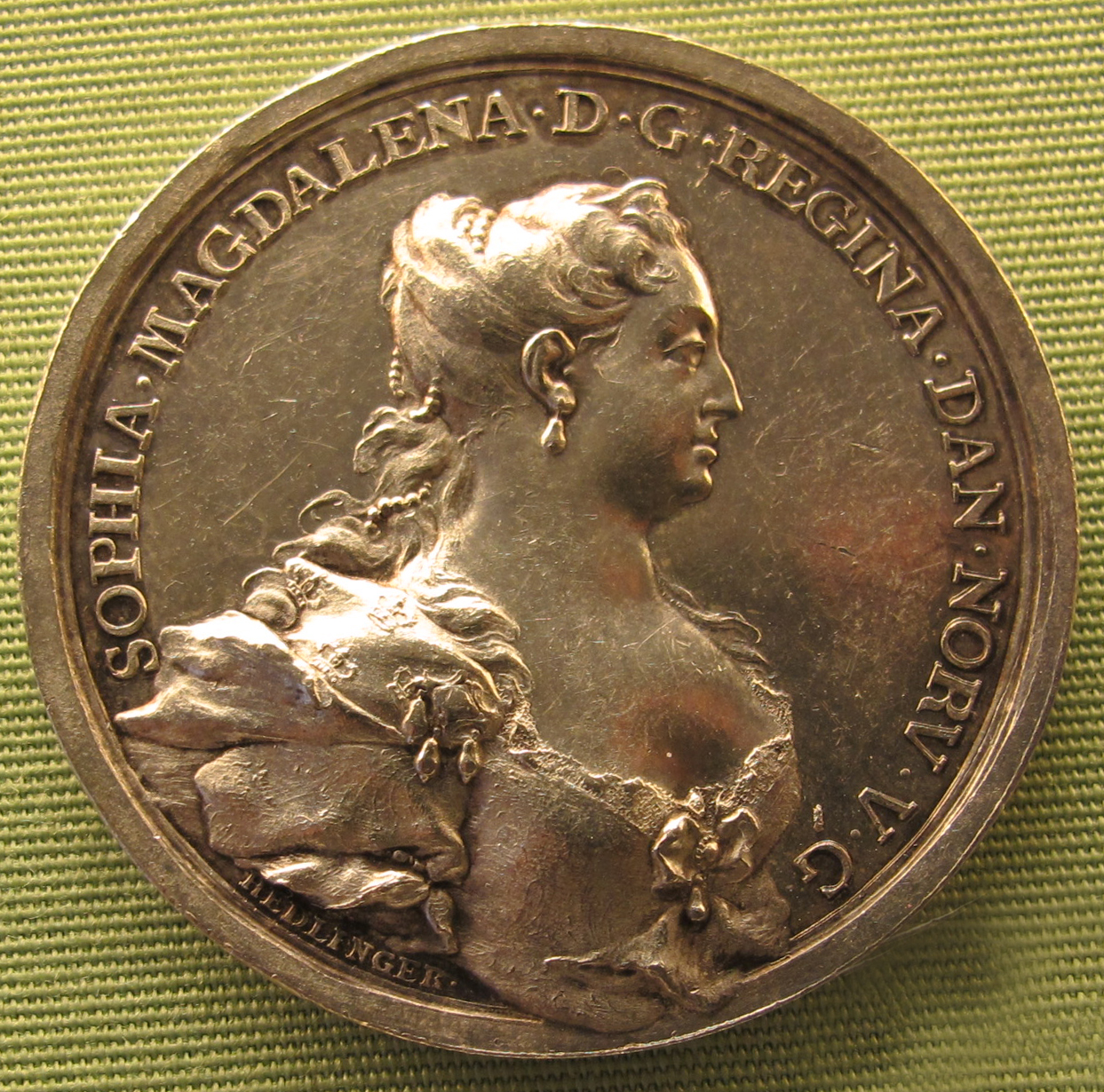
Coin by Johann Karl von Hedlinger with portrait of Sophie Magdalene.

The marriage between the king and queen was harmonious and her husband loved and trusted her, but the royal couple was not popular. Queen Sophie Magdalene was described as haughty, arrogant and proud, and she was accused of isolating the royal family within the court, which was dominated by the royal couple's strong religious feelings and the German favorites and relatives of the queen.

A number of laws and prohibitions inspired by the strong religious feelings of the royal couple were issued, including a ban against theater performances and rides on Sundays, and in 1735, it introduced public holiday regulation with obligatory church attendance, where breaches of duty resulted in fines or time in jail. Sophie Magdalene's religiosity and strong influence of Pietism was expressed when, in 1737, she founded at Vallø Castle the Noble Vallø Foundation for Unmarried Daughters (Danish: Det Adelige Stift Vallø for ugifte døtre), a home for aging and aristocratic unmarried women.

Despite their Pietism, however, the royal couple loved the splendor and luxury; King Louis XIV of France was their great princely role model. Sophie Magdalene made the most of her position as queen in matters of rank, precedence and ceremony, and the court life was a mixture of subdued religious puritanism and ceremonious pomp. The queen was also accused of creating a certain isolation around the royal family. The king and the queen rarely let themselves be seen in public, and were so humanly hostile that they let themselves be transported through the city in a carriage with covered windows.

Sophie Magdalene led an extravagant lifestyle - despite Denmark's faltering economy. Following the fashion of queens of her day, she owned a lathe built by Diderich de Thurah, 1735–36, which she used for turning items of ivory or precious woods. It has been speculated that the love of Sophie Magdalene for the jewels and luxury came from her father-in-law, after watching him cover his consort, Anna Sophie von Reventlow, with jewels and other gifts. She also enjoyed fashion.

Queen Sophie Magdalene was accused of never having discarded her German, even though German culture and language had been dominant at the Court before her time: the first member of the Danish royal family who spoke Danish rather than German was in fact Sophie Magdalene's great grandson, Frederik VI. The Queen learned Danish, but German was the language spoken at court and in high society. Nevertheless, her favoritism toward all things German over Denmark was widely reputed. Her German entourage was given important positions at court and was favored over Danes; her brothers were outranked "Princes of the Blood," and her German ladies-in-waiting was given a rank over all the countesses of the Kingdom. Among her German favorites was Frederica of Württemberg (1699-1781), who attracted widespread dislike. The queen's dislike for all Danes was so pronounced that when she once visited Valløs noble monastery, where lived a majority of German women, she cried on the way into the room of the Danish Miss Rosenkrantz and reportedly said: "It smells so Danish!" (Es riecht hier so dänisch!).

As a queen, she received several of her relatives in Denmark. Her younger sister, Sophie Caroline, Dowager Princess of Ostfriesland, was appointed by her as abbess at Vallø stift, with an annual pension of 16,600 thalers, a large sum in those times. At the National Archives is a letter from Sophie Magdalene to her husband. She asked him to allow the return of her sister to Ostfriesland. The reason was that the queen was violently jealous of her, and was sure that Sophie Caroline and Christian VI had an affair. The king replied "that he with all his heart was willing to let her go, if with this he could win his wife's confidence and heart, but it would hurt the Princess". At end, Sophie Caroline was not expelled. The suspected affair became known enough to have been the subject of the later court case of Anna Sophie Magdalene Frederikke Ulrikke, who claimed to have been the result of the purported affair. Two of Sophie Magdalene's brothers were Danish admirals, and her mother, Dowager Margravine Sophie Christiane of Brandenburg-Kulmbach, arrived to Denmark after the announcement of Sophie Magdalene's first pregnancy in 1723, staying at Sorgenfri Palace in Kongens Lyngby, where she remained for the rest of her life until her death in 1737.

The relationship between the king and queen continued to be very close and their marriage happy until their death. According to a contemporary story, the queen was so jealous that she preferred her appointed ladies-in-waiting to be so unattractive as possible so as not to risk attracting the king; however, her jealousy was regarded as completely unnecessary. While her influence over her spouse was great, she does not seem to have shown much interest for politics, and when he at one point suggested that she be made regent if their son should succeed him while still a child, she displayed great dislike for and disinterest in the idea.

For Sophie Magdalene it was a source of great concern and disappointment that none of her two surviving children inherited the strict religious ideals and lifestyle of their parents. King Frederick V was known in history as a notorious drunkard with sadistic tendencies, while Princess Louise reportedly became pregnant by a Valet de chambre, a scandal that caused her to be hastily married with the Duke of Saxe-Hildburghausen, who received a large dowry in compensation.

In 1746, her husband died, and was succeeded by her son, Frederick V.

=== L'Union parfaite ===
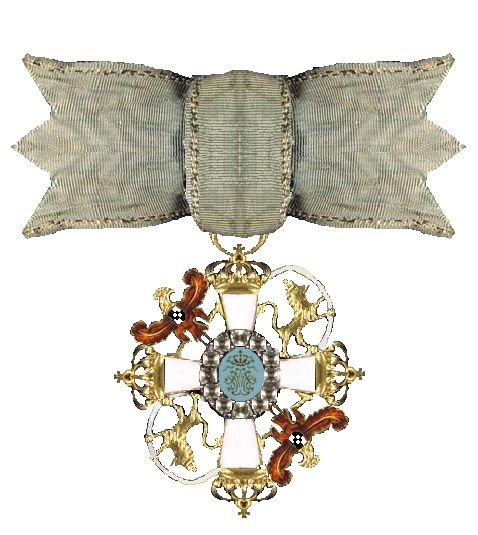
Ordre de l'Union Parfaite

In 1732, she founded the order Ordre de l'Union Parfaite, which was to be given only to women who lived in happy marriages, inspired by the royal couple's love marriage.

The Order was the first Danish order created for women.

=== Queen Dowager ===
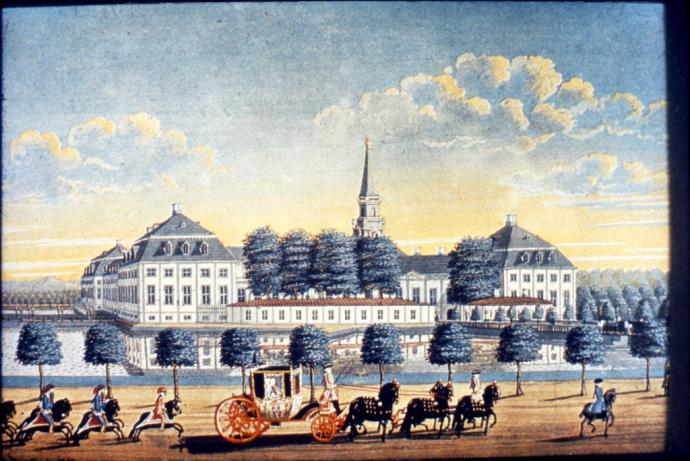
Hirschholm Palace was Sophie Magdalene's favorite summer retreat.

As a queen dowager, she lived a discreet life under the reign of her son Frederick V, with whom she was too different in character to get along. She disliked his favorite, Adam Gottlob Moltke, whom she blamed for the distance between them.

She had Hirschholm Palace built, where she spent her summers as a widow, while living in Christiansborg Palace in winter.

In 1766, her grandson Christian VII succeed to the throne. During the reign of her grandson, she got more attention, as she was on much better terms with her grandchildren than with her children. Crown Prince Christian and his cousin, Prince Charles of Hesse-Kassel, spent much time with the queen dowager on Hirschholm.

Sophie Magdalene and her grandson, the later King Christian VII, had a warm and close relationship. He could find at the side of his grandmother a loving refuge from his strict overhofmester, Ditlev Reventlow. Christian and his cousin, Prince Charles of Hesse-Kassel, spent much time with Sophie Magdalene at Hirschholm Palace, much to Reventlow's regret; he complained that the crown prince "was so spoiled by Sophie Magdalene during his days with her that he became a boy again". In addition, Sophie Magdalene also hosted almost all Christian's birthdays celebrations. Sophie Magdalene was distantly related with King Christian VII's mistress, Anne Cathrine Benthagen, the famous Støvlet-Cathrine, who reportedly was the illegitimate daughter of Prince Georg Ludwig of Brunswick-Bevern, whose sister was married with one of the queen's brothers. During Christian's reign, Moltke was disfavored and Danneskjöld was favored on her advice.

She spent her later years in bad health, or, as it was said, in hypochondria. She died in Christiansborg Palace on 27 May 1770 and was buried in Roskilde Cathedral.

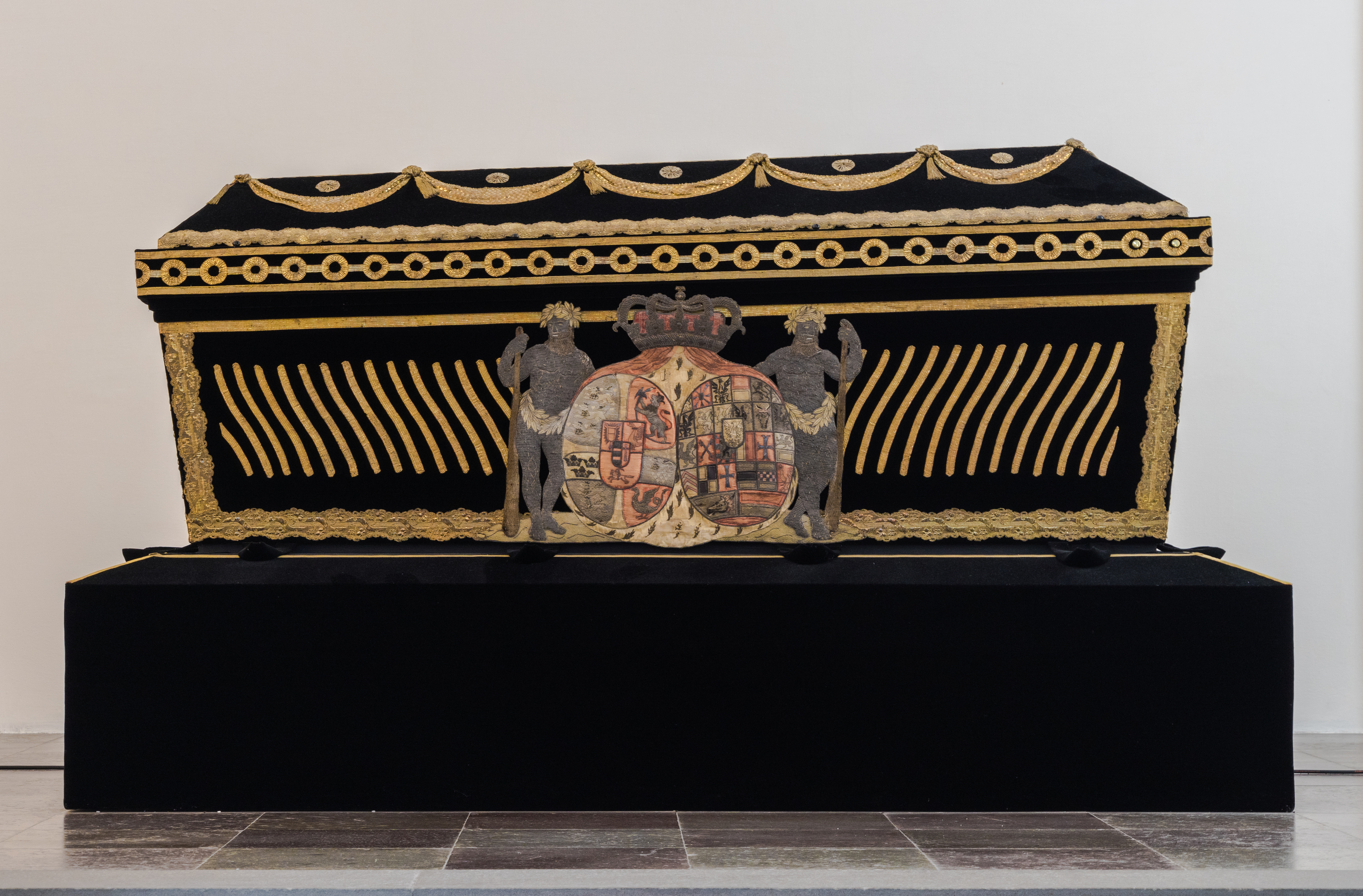
Her sarcophagus with embroidered coats of arms, in Roskilde Cathedral, Denmark.

== Issue ==
- Frederick V of Denmark (31 March 1723 – 14 January 1766)
- Princess Louise (19 June 1724 – 20 December 1724)
- Princess Louise (19 October 1726 – 8 August 1756), married Ernest Frederick III, Duke of Saxe-Hildburghausen.

== Ancestry ==
Ancestors of Sophie Magdalene of Brandenburg-Kulmbach

8. Christian, Margrave of Brandenburg-Bayreuth
4. Georg Albrecht, Margrave of Brandenburg-Bayreuth-Kulmbach
9. Duchess Marie of Prussia
2. Christian Heinrich, Margrave of Brandenburg-Bayreuth-Kulmbach
10. Philipp, Duke of Schleswig-Holstein-Sonderburg-Norburg
5. Princess Marie Elisabeth of Schleswig-Holstein-Glücksburg
11. Princess Sophie Hedwig of Saxe-Lauenburg
1. Sophie Magdalene of Brandenburg-Kulmbach
12. Johann Friedrich, Count of Wolfstein
6. Albrecht Friedrich, Count of Wolfstein
13. Baroness Barbara Teuffel von Guntersdorf
3. Countess Sophie Christiane of Wolfstein
14. Wolfgang Georg I, Count of Castell-Remlingen
7. Countess Sophie Luise of Castell-Remlingen
15. Countess Sophia Juliana of Hohenlohe-Waldenburg-Pfedelbach

== Bibliography ==
- (in Danish) Article in the Dansk biografisk Lexikon
- Biography
- Damstrup, Ellen B., Christian 6., Sophie Magdalene og Norgesrejsen 1733 , 1989
- Dehn-Nielsen, Henning, Christian 7. – den gale konge, 2000
- Dehn-Nielsen, Henning, Danmarks Konger og Regenter, 1996
- Feldbæk, Ole (1990). "Den lange fred" [The long peace]. In Olsen, Olaf (ed.). Gyldendal og Politikens Danmarkshistorie (in Danish). Vol. 9: 1700-1800. Copenhagen: Gyldendal og Politikens Forlag. ISBN 87-89068-11-4.
- Langen, Ulrik, Den Afmægtige – en biografi om Christian 7., 2008
- Langer, Jerk W., Kongehusets sygdomme – fra Gorm den Gamle til dronning Margrethe, 1997
- Nielsen, Kay m.f., Danmarks Konger og Dronninger
- Tillyard, Stella, En Kongelig Affære – Caroline Matilde og hendes søskende, 2007 (original English edition 2006)

Sophie Magdalene of Brandenburg-Kulmbach House of Hohenzollern Born: 28 November 1700 Died: 27 May 1770
Danish royalty
| Preceded by Anne Sophie Reventlow | Queen consort of Denmark and Norway; 1730–1746 | Succeeded by Louise of Great Britain |
