= Princess Anna Sophie of Denmark =

Electress of Saxony from 1680 to 1691

Anna Sophie of Denmark and Norway
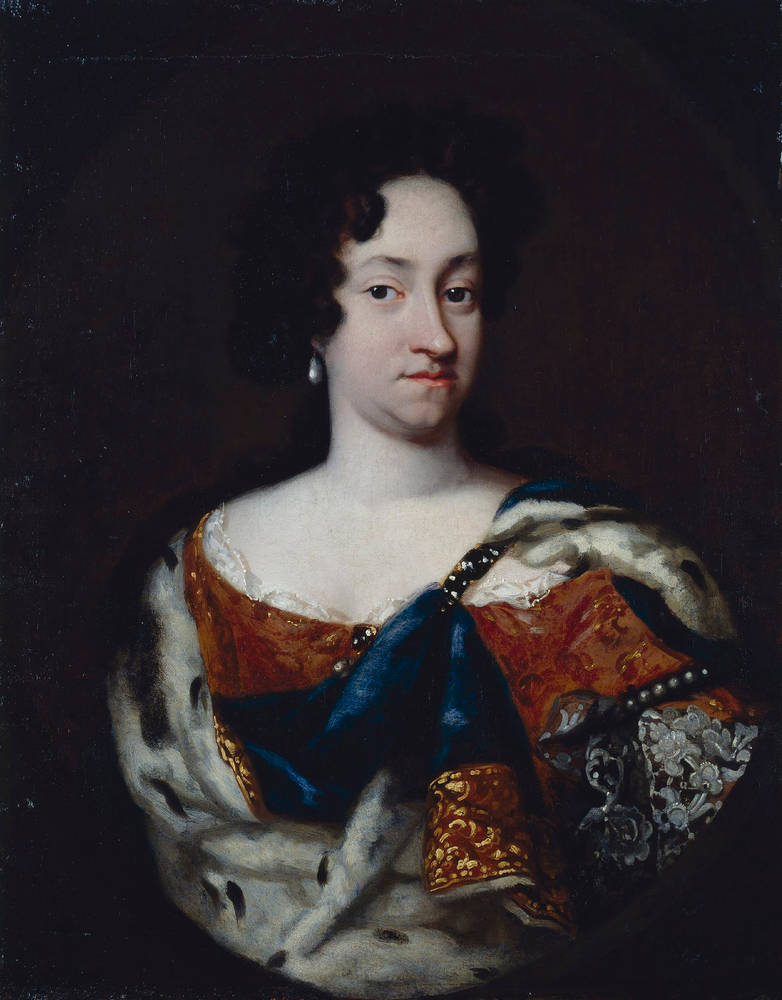
- Portrait by Samuel Bottschild

Electress consort of Saxony
- Tenure: 22 August 1680 – 12 September 1691
- Born: 1 September 1647; Flensburg, Duchy of Schleswig
- Died: 1 July 1717 (aged 69); Prettin, Electorate of Saxony
- Burial: Freiberg Cathedral
- Spouse: John George III, Elector of Saxony (m. 1666; died 1691)
- Issue: John George IV; Frederick Augustus I
- House: Oldenburg
- Father: Frederick III of Denmark
- Mother: Sophie Amalie of Brunswick-Lüneburg

Princess Anna Sophie of Denmark and Norway (1 September 1647 – 1 July 1717) was the eldest daughter of King Frederick III of Denmark and Sophie Amalie of Brunswick-Lüneburg, and Electress of Saxony from 1680 to 1691 as the wife of John George III.

== Early life ==
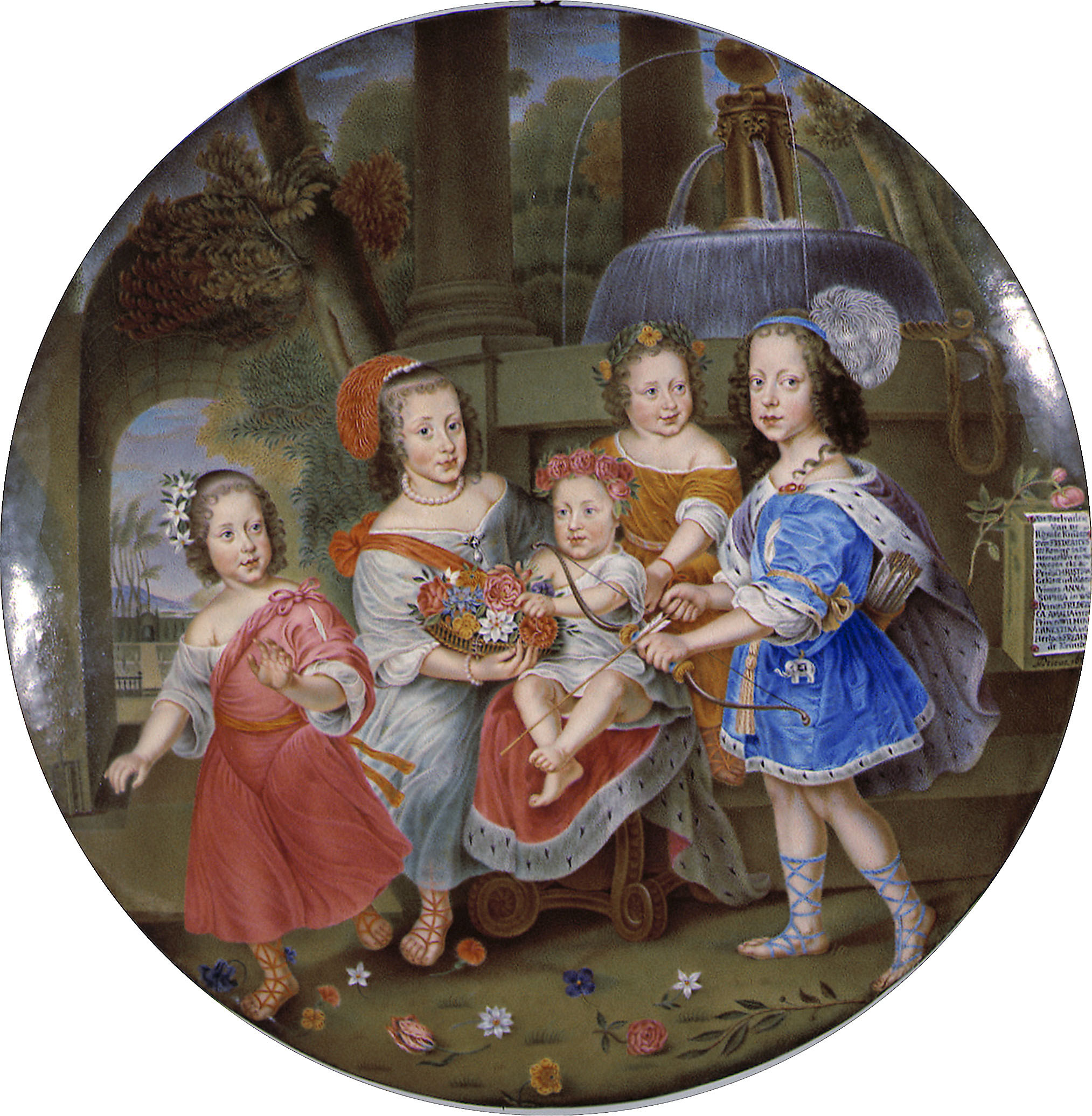
Anna Sophie (probably dressed in white) pictured with her siblings in 1652

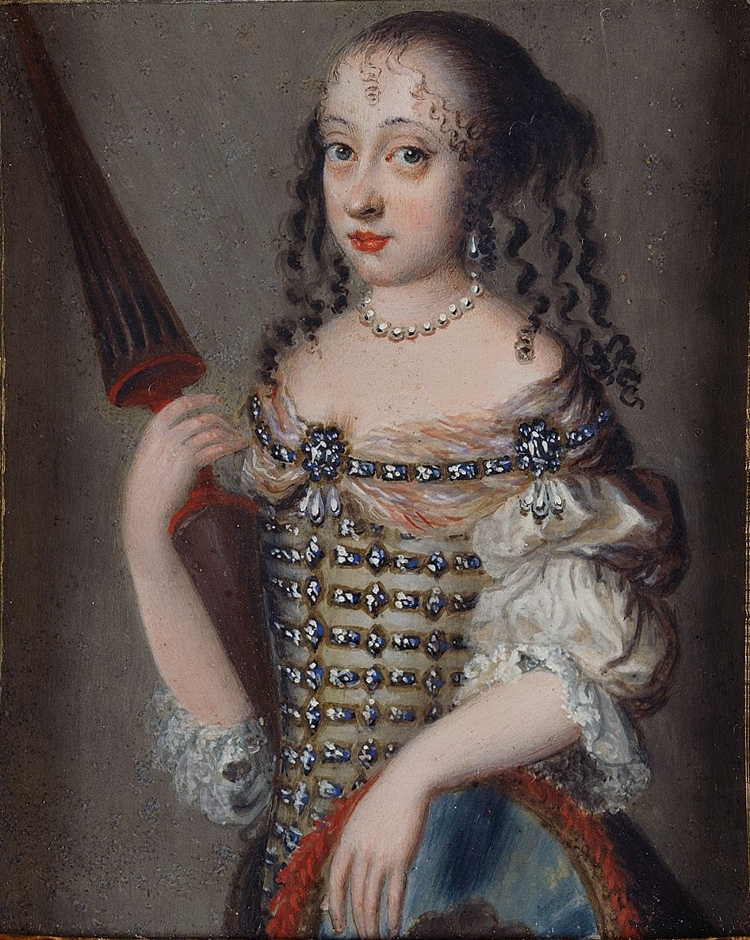
Anna Sophie as princess in the Danish court

Anna Sophie was born in Flensburg, the second child and first daughter of Frederick of Denmark and his wife, Sophie Amalie of Brunswick-Lüneburg. She had an elder brother, Christian, the future King of Denmark and Norway. Her paternal grandfather, King Christian IV, died when she was six months old, and after many months of deliberation, the Rigsraadet royal council and Estates elected her father king. He was crowned Frederick III on 23 November 1648. Her parents had six more children, two of whom died in infancy. Her surviving siblings were Frederica Amalia, Wilhelmina Ernestine, George, and Ulrika Eleonora.

Anna Sophie received a fine education. Besides her native Danish, she knew German, Latin, French, Spanish and Italian. She is described physically as having thick dark eyebrows and long curving nose. During her childhood, she as well as her sisters were brought up under the supervision of the royal governess Helena von Westphalen. In 1663, she was given her own court under Enevold Parsberg.

In 1662, the negotiations about her marriage were initiated, and she met with John Georg, who visited the Danish court with his mother. In 1663, a celebration was held at Copenhagen Castle honouring the fifteen-year-old princess's engagement to John George III, Elector of Saxony. John Georg and his mother once again visited Denmark in person to be present. Anna Sophie and John George were married three years later, on 9 October 1666. The Polish king John III Sobieski later said of her husband, "[He] is an honest man with a straight heart."

== Marriage ==
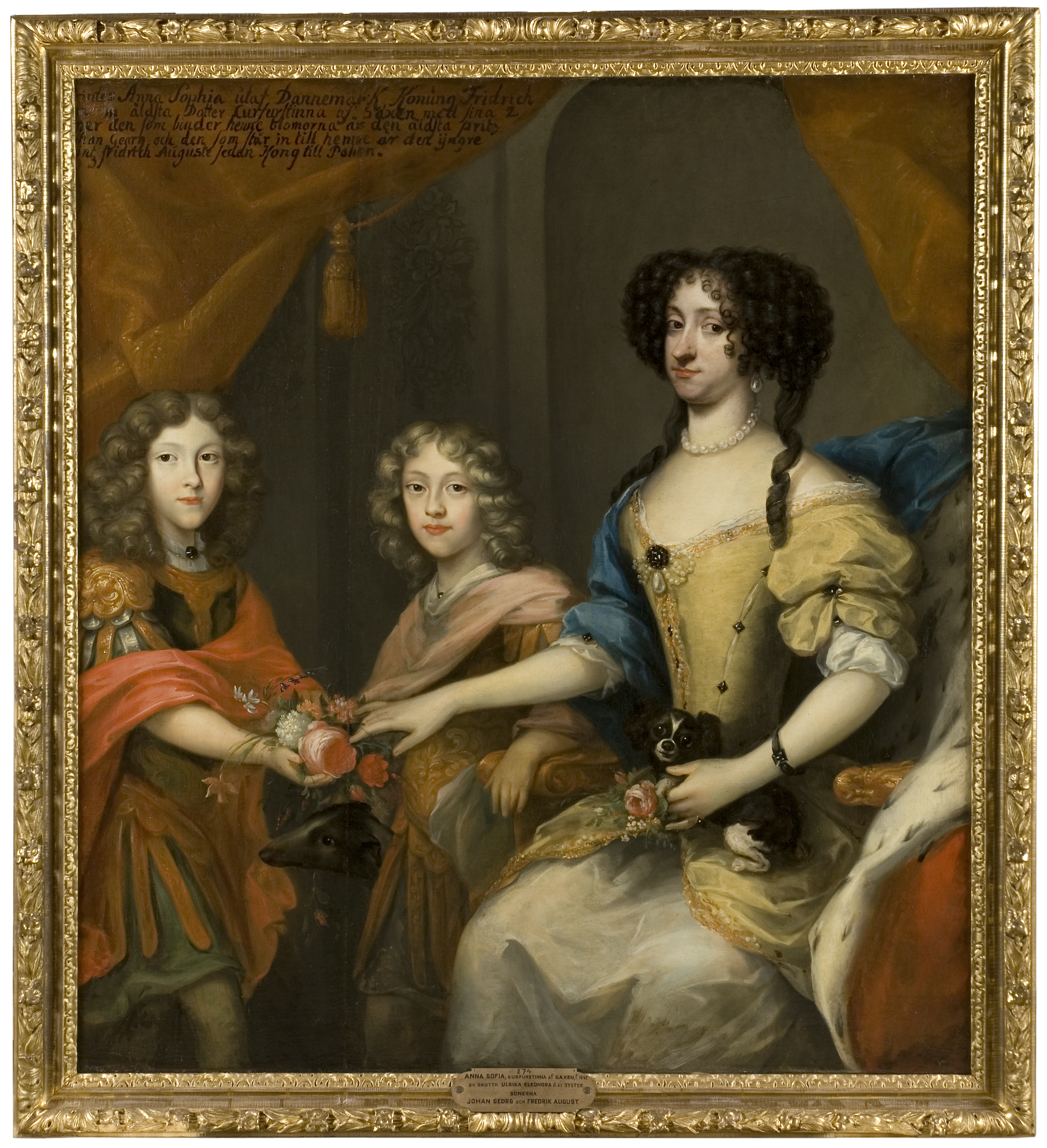
Anna Sophia with her sons John and Frederick Augustus (portrait by David von Krafft, c. 1675–80)

The relationship between Anna Sophie and John Georg is not described as a happy one. Her husband also had an illegitimate son by his official mistress, a Venetian opera singer named Margarita Salicola, and may have had a daughter, Magdalena Sibylla of Neidschutz, with Ursula Margarethe of Haugwitz. Both her sons were initially brought up by Danish ladies-in-waiting sent to Dresden by her mother. The relationship between Anna Sophie and her two sons are described as somewhat tense.

Anna Sophie's father died on 9 February 1670 and was succeeded by her elder brother, Christian V, with whom she held a very active correspondence and discussed political matters. She visited Denmark that year and expressed her sympathy for the imprisoned Leonora Christina Ulfeldt, her half aunt.

In 1680, Anna Sophie became Electress of Saxony. Her widowed sister Wilhelmina Ernestine, Dowager Electress Palatine, came to live with her in Saxony in 1685. Anna Sophie had her eldest son engaged to her niece, Princess Sophia Hedwig of Denmark against the will of the Saxon court; however, when her son succeeded his father as elector in 1691, he broke the engagement.

== Dowager Electress ==
Her husband died in 1692 in Tübingen of an epidemic illness, probably cholera or the plague, and was buried in the Cathedral of Freiberg. The next year, Anna Sophie attempted to end the love affair between her elder son, then Elector Johann Georg IV, and his mistress, Magdalene Sibylle "Billa" of Neidschutz, with whom he had been living openly since his father's death. Her late husband had tried to break up the couple, perhaps motivated by fears that a close blood relationship existed between the lovers—for Billa may have been his own daughter by Ursula Margarethe of Haugwitz, and therefore John George IV's half-sister. John George IV was either ignorant of the possibility that he and Billa were committing incest, or he disregarded the claim as a malicious rumor.

Anna Sophie forced her son into marrying Eleonore Erdmuthe of Saxe-Eisenach, a German noblewoman, but the marriage proved a disastrous failure. John George IV not only abandoned his bride, leaving her at the Hofe (the official residence of the Elector) to be with his mistress at another palace, but eventually tried to murder her so he could marry Billa.

Anna Sophie's daughter-in-law failed to produce an heir, suffering two miscarriages, in August 1692 and February 1693. In June 1693, her son's mistress gave birth to a daughter, Wilhelmina Maria Frederica. Less than a year later Billa contracted smallpox and died on 4 April 1694, in the arms of the Elector. Johann Georg himself died 23 days later of the same disease, and was buried in the Freiberg Cathedral. Having died without legitimate issue, he was succeeded by his brother, who took over the guardianship of the orphaned Frederica. She was raised at the royal court and acknowledged as Frederick August's niece.

After her son was elected King of Poland and converted to Catholicism in 1697, she, as well as her daughter-in-law Queen Christiane Eberhardine, enjoyed immense popularity in Saxony as a symbol of Protestant faith and protection against Catholic Poland, which the Protestants feared would enforce a counter reformation.

Anna Sophie brought up her grandson Friedrich August, born on 17 October 1696, the only child of her second son and his estranged, self-exiled wife, Christiane Eberhardine of Brandenburg-Bayreuth. The boy would one day succeed his father as Augustus III of Poland. Anna Sophie and her daughter-in-law got on well, both women agreeing especially on matters of religion, and Eberhardine visited her son often.

In her later years, Anna Sophie lived with her sister Wilhelmina Ernestine at Castle Lichtenburg. She died in Prettin.

== Issue ==
- John George IV (Dresden, 18 October 1668 – Dresden, 28 May 1694), succeeded his father as elector;
- Frederick Augustus I (Dresden, 22 May 1670 – Warsaw, 1 February 1733), succeeded his brother as elector and later became king of Poland (reigned as Augustus II).

== Ancestry ==
Ancestors of Princess Anna Sophie of Denmark

8. Frederick II of Denmark
4. Christian IV of Denmark
9. Sophie of Mecklenburg-Güstrow
2. Frederick III of Denmark
10. Joachim Frederick, Elector of Brandenburg
5. Anne Catherine of Brandenburg
11. Catherine of Brandenburg-Küstrin
1. Anna Sophie of Denmark
12. William VI, Duke of Brunswick-Lüneburg
6. George, Duke of Brunswick-Lüneburg
13. Dorothea of Denmark
3. Sophie Amalie of Brunswick-Lüneburg
14. Louis V, Landgrave of Hesse-Darmstadt
7. Anne Eleonore of Hesse-Darmstadt
15. Magdalena of Brandenburg

== Literature ==
- Hans-Joachim Böttcher: Christiane Eberhardine Prinzessin von Brandenburg-Bayreuth, Kurfürstin von Sachsen und Königin von Polen, Gemahlin August des Starken. Dresdner Buchverlag 2011. ISBN 978-3-941757-25-7.
- Hans-Joachim Böttcher: Johann Georg IV. von Sachsen & Magdalena Sibylla von Neitschütz - Eine tödliche Liaison. Dresdner Buchverlag 2014. ISBN 978-3-941757-43-1.

Royal titles
Preceded by Magdalene Sybille of Brandenburg-Bayreuth	Electress consort of Saxony; 1680–1691	Succeeded by Eleonore Erdmuthe of Saxe-Eisenach
