= Antoni Malczewski =

Polish poet

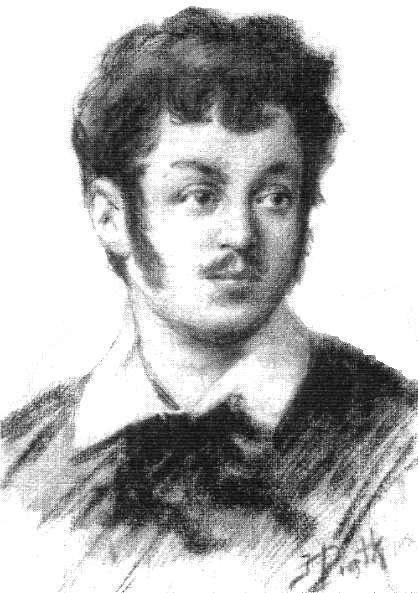
- Born: 3 June 1793; Volhynia or Warsaw
- Died: 2 May 1826 (aged 32); Warsaw
- Occupation: poet
- Writing career
- Literary movement: Romanticism, Pessimism

Antoni Malczewski (3 June 1793 – 2 May 1826) was a Polish romantic poet, known for his only work, "a narrative poem of dire pessimism", Maria (1825).

At the time, prominent and scandalizing was his autodestructive romance with a married woman, Zofia Rucińska, who had a mental illness.

== Biography ==
Malczewski was born to a wealthy family in either Volhynia or Warsaw, and attended school in Krzemieniec (modern-day Kremenets, Ukraine), but did not graduate. He joined the army of the short-lived Duchy of Warsaw during the Napoleonic Wars in 1811, and remained in the army of Congress Poland under Emperor Alexander from 1815. He was wounded in the foot in a duel in 1816 and so had to leave the army.

After leaving the army, he spent several years traveling through western Europe, staying some time in Paris, climbing Mont Blanc in 1818, and spending a good portion of his inherited fortune. He returned to his estate in Volhynia in 1821, where he began an ill-fated affair with a married woman and began writing. He moved to Warsaw in 1824, where he published the poetic novel Maria at his own expense in 1825, and died in poverty the next year in unclear circumstances.

== Work ==
Malczewski's fame rests almost solely upon that of Maria, published near the end of his life and popularized in the decade following his death (an English translation appeared in 1835). Considered a masterpiece of Polish Romanticism, it tells the tale of a young noble woman who marries above her station, and so incurs the wrath of her husband's family, who plot revenge. It is generally held to be most influenced by Lord Byron, whom Malczewski had met in Venice during his travels around western Europe, though it is considerably more gloomy and Gothic than Byron's work. Malczewski is sometimes considered part of the "Ukrainian school" in Polish poetry, though others consider his work to stand uniquely separate. Maria was also influential on later Polish poets, especially Adam Mickiewicz, and on writer Joseph Conrad.

== Genealogy ==
Ancestors of Antoni Malczewski

16. Jan Franciszek Malczewski
8. Antoni Malczewski
17. -
4. Ignacy Malczewski
18. ? Dobrzyński
9. Marianna Dobrzyńska
19. -
2. Jan Józef Malczewski
20. Świętosław Franciszek Dunin
10. Świętosław Piotr Dunin
21. Zofia Manowska
5. Antonina Dunin
22. John George IV, Elector of Saxony
11. Wilhelmina Maria Fryderyka von Rochlitz
23. Magdalena Sibylla von Rochlitz
1. Antoni Malczewski
24. -
12. -
25. -
6. ? Błeszyński
13. -
3. Konstancja Błeszyńska
28. -
14. -
29. -
7. primo voto Młocka
30. -
15. -
31. -

== See also ==
- Aiguille du Midi
