= Wilhelmina Maria Frederica of Rochlitz =

Polish noblewoman

Frederica
- Countess of Rochlitz
- Full name: Wilhelmina Maria Frederica; Polish: Wilhelmina Maria Fryderyka
- Born: 20 June 1693
- Died: After 1729
- Noble family: Wettin
- Spouse: Count Świętosław Piotr Dunin
- Issue: Fryderyk Piotr Dunin; Antonina Malczewski; Marianna Tomkowicz; Józefa Dunin
- Father: John George IV, Elector of Saxony
- Mother: Magdalena Sibylla of Neidschutz

Wilhelmina Maria Frederica, Countess of Rochlitz (Polish: Wilhelmina Maria Fryderyka; 20 June 1693 – after 1729) was a Polish noblewoman of German descent. She was the illegitimate daughter of John George IV, Elector of Saxony, and Magdalene Sibylle, Countess of Rochlitz, his official mistress. Her parents, who may have been half-siblings, both died from smallpox soon after her birth, and she was raised in Poland at the royal court of her uncle and guardian, Augustus II the Strong of Poland.

== Parents ==
Her mother's mother, Ursula Margaretha von Neitschütz, was a member of the noble Upper Lusatian family of Haugwitz and the wife of a Lusatian noble named Rudolf von Neitschütz. She had many lovers in her younger years, and one of them was the electoral prince of Saxony, John George, and later Elector John George III. Her eldest daughter, Magdalene Sibylle, called Billa, was officially recognized as her husband's daughter but may have been the daughter of John George III. Later the Elector's son and successor, John George IV, began an affair with Billa, which his father tried to prevent by banishing Ursula and Billa from court, suggesting a fear of incest. However, when John George III died, his son lived openly with Billa and tried to marry her. Wilhelmina Maria Frederica was the product of their affair.

== Life ==
She was born in Frankfurt am Main and orphaned at less than a year old by both her parents' deaths from smallpox. For the first year of her life (until her father's death) she was in a way a stepsister of Caroline of Ansbach, future queen consort of Great Britain, being the daughter of Caroline's then-stepfather. Her first two names, Wilhelmina Maria, were given in honour of the King and Queen of England, William and Mary; however, contrary to popular assumption, the English monarchs were not her godparents. Sir William Dutton Colt, the English envoy to Dresden since 1689, was her actual godfather. The name Frederica was given to please the Danish royal family. (Frederick was the name of her grandmother, the Dowager Electress Anna Sophie's father, Frederick III of Denmark.) Her godfather having died when she was two months old, she was raised at the royal court of her uncle and guardian, Augustus II the Strong, King of Poland.

In 1720 she married a Polish nobleman, Count Świętosław Piotr Dunin (died 1736), Castellan of Radom. They had four or five children:

- Frederick Peter (Fryderyk Piotr) Dunin (1729–1788); a general.
- Antonina Dunin; married Ignacy Malczewski.
- Marianna Dunin; married Antoni Tomkowicz.
- Josepha (Józefa) Dunin, a nun.

Through her daughter Antonina, she was the great-grandmother of Polish romantic poet Antoni Malczewski.

== Sources ==
- Sharp, Tony. Pleasure and Ambition: The Life, Loves and Wars of Augustus the Strong, 1670-1707. London: I.B. Tauris, 2001. Google Books. Web. 24 May 2010. <https://books.google.com/books?id=3X71YRvm9m4C>.
