= Antonio Cottini =

Antonio Cottini (fl. 1681 – c. 1708), sometimes spelled Antonio Cottino and also known as Antonio Pietro Galli and Antonio Pietro Galli detto Cottini, was an Italian bass who flourished during the second half of the 17th century and early 18th century. He should not be confused with a castrato named Antonio Cottini, who, among other engagements, sang in the Dresden court chapel in 1688.

== Biography ==
In his early years, Antonio Cottini was known as simply Cottini on the stage; sometimes given as Cottino or Cottina. His real name was Antonio Pietro Galli. He first appeared in Florence in 1661. His only known stage performance prior to 1677 was in Jacopo Melani’s Ercole in Tebe (1661). He performed the role of Zeffiro in this opera. He was active in the city of Hanover in 1668-1669. The manuscript of Marco Giuseppe Peranda's Il sacrificio di Iephte (1675, Ferrara) contains a dedication signed by Cottini.

On January 8, 1676 he was hired as a court singer by Ferdinando Carlo Gonzaga, Duke of Mantua. He later billed himself as "virtuoso of the Duke of Modena" when he performed in Pietro Andrea Ziani's opera Attila in Milan on 19 January 1677. That same year he was active as an opera singer in the cities of Modena and Milan. In both cities he portrayed the main character in Giovanni Legrenzi's opera Germanico sul Reno. This production also starred his wife, the opera singer Francesca Maria Sarti. In 1677 he became a court musician to the Duke of Modena in whose service he remained for at least 30 years. He was frequently cast in operas staged in the Duchy of Modena until its French occupation in 1702 during the War of the Spanish Succession.

From 1677 until 1708, Cottini returned with frequency to theaters in Venice to perform in operas. The most prolific portion of his career was from 1685 to 1705; during which time he performed in operas in many cities beyond just Modena like Reggio Emilia, Milan, Turin, and in Genoa. A list of operas he performed in is catalogued in Bianconi and Walker's article in Early Music History: Studies in Medieval and Early Modern Music. In 1680 he was active in Dresden, and in Bologna where his signature is found in the manuscript score to the opera Odoacre in which he appeared in its premiere at the Teatro del Pubblico on 16 August 1680. In 1683 he performed in the world premiere of Ziani's Il talamo preservato dalla fedeltà d'Eudossa in Reggio Emilia with fellow cast members including Margarita Salicola, her sister Angiola Salicola, and tenor Giovanni Buzzoleni.

In addition to working as an opera singer, Cottini was also an impresario who commissioned works for the stage. Extant opera scores from the city of Modena dated to 1697 and 1703–1704 are dedicated to him for this reason. The scores of the music written for Cottini demonstrate a performance range from G_{2} to E_{4}. Musicologist Jennifer Williams Brown documents Cottini's role as an "aria broker"; demonstrating the large number of recycled arias appearing in productions connected to Cottini, and theorizing that Cottini sold arias to singers for reuse across multiple productions. After 1708 performances in Venice nothing is known about the singer.
