= Marco Giuseppe Peranda =

Italian composer

Marco Giuseppe Peranda (baptized 4 April 1626 in Macerata – 12 January 1675 in Dresden) was an Italian musician and composer active in the Holy Roman Empire.

== Life ==
He was one of the most notable Italian musicians in the Holy Roman Empire during the early Baroque alongside Vincenzo Albrici, Carlo Pallavicino and Giovanni Andrea Bontempi in Dresden. These four Italian Kapellmeisters were well rewarded – they earned yearly salaries of 1,200 Reichstalers while Heinrich Schütz, at this point semi-retired, earned 800 Reichstalers a year. A contemporary, Agostino Rossi, records him as being a native of Macerata but his musical style shows an education in Rome. From 1651 Perenda was an alto singer in the chapel of Johann Georg II of Saxony as he combined his own chapel choir with that of his father's. In 1661 Peranda became Vizekapellmeister and in 1663 Kapellmeister, as successor of Albrici. His opera Dafne (composed in collaboration) was performed to open the Opernhaus am Taschenberg in Dresden. In 1670 he made a journey to Italy, from which two masses and a motet remain in the Kroměříž residence. In 1672 he was promoted again, to Hofkapellmeister, possibly since Christoph Bernhard had taken a better offer in Hamburg. In 1675 Peranda died, and since unlike some Italian musicians he had never converted to Lutheranism, was buried in St Marienstern Monastery near Dresden.

== Works ==
Only an estimated third of his works survive:

- 1668: Markus-Passion (Historia des Leidens und Sterbens unseres Herren Jesu Christi)
- 1668: Weihnachtshistorie (lost)
- 1671: Dafne (Opera with Giovanni Andrea Bontempi)
- 1673: Jupiter und Jo (lost – a collaboration with Bontempi or Constantin Christian Dedekind)
- 1675: Il sacrificio di Jefte (i.e. Jephtha, lost, libretto survives); starred Antonio Cottini in its premiere
