= John George IV =

Elector of Saxony from 1691 to 1694

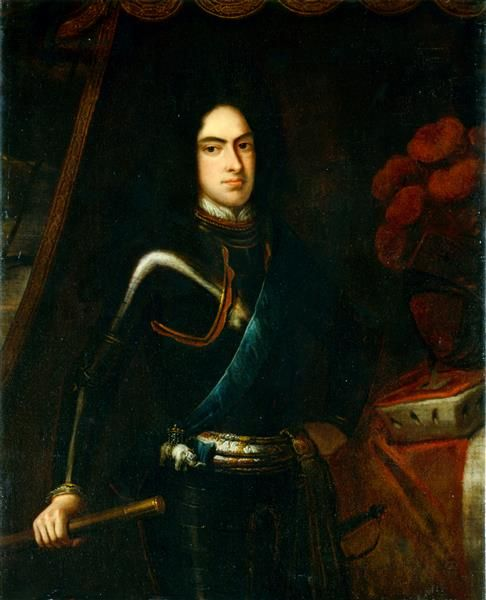
- Portrait by Heinrich Christoph Fehling

Elector of Saxony
- Reign: 12 September 1691 – 27 April 1694
- Predecessor: John George III
- Successor: Frederick Augustus I
- Born: 18 October 1668; Dresden, Electorate of Saxony, Holy Roman Empire
- Died: 27 April 1694 (aged 25); Dresden, Electorate of Saxony, Holy Roman Empire
- Burial: Freiberg Cathedral
- Spouse: Eleonore Erdmuthe of Saxe-Eisenach (m. 1692)
- Issue: Wilhelmina Maria Fryderyka von Rochlitz (illegitimate)
- House: Wettin
- Father: John George III, Elector of Saxony
- Mother: Princess Anna Sophie of Denmark
- Religion: Lutheran

John George IV (18 October 1668 in Dresden – 27 April 1694 in Dresden) was Elector of Saxony from 1691 to 1694. He belonged to the Albertine branch of the House of Wettin and was the eldest son of John George III, Elector of Saxony and Anna Sophie of Denmark.

== First years as elector ==
John George succeeded his father as elector when he died, on 12 September 1691.

At the beginning of his reign his chief adviser was Hans Adam von Schöning, who counselled a union between Saxony and Brandenburg and a more independent attitude towards the emperor. In accordance with this advice certain proposals were put before Leopold I to which he refused to agree; and consequently the Saxon troops withdrew from the imperial army, a proceeding which led the chagrined emperor to seize and imprison Schöning in July 1692. Although John George was unable to procure his minister's release, Leopold managed to allay the elector's anger, and early in 1693 the Saxon soldiers rejoined the imperialists.

== Marriage and The Neidschutz Affair ==
In Leipzig on 17 April 1692, John George married Eleonore Erdmuthe of Saxe-Eisenach, Dowager Margravine of Brandenburg-Ansbach. The young elector was forced to marry by his mother, the Dowager Electress Anna Sophie, supposedly to produce legitimate heirs to the electorate. The real reason for the marriage was to end the liaison between John George and Magdalena Sibylla of Neidschutz.

John George III, the late elector had tried to separate the lovers, perhaps because he was aware of a close blood relationship between them — for Magdalena Sybilla may have been his own illegitimate daughter by Ursula Margarethe of Haugwitz, and therefore John George IV's half-sister. By order of the elector, Ursula had married Colonel Rudolf of Neidschutz, who officially appears as the father of her daughter.

John George may never have known of his possible blood relationship to Magdalena Sibylla or regarded the claim as a rumor spread by ill-wishers. Immediately after he assumed the electorate, he openly lived with her, and she became the first ever Official Mistress (Favoritin) of an elector of Saxony.

The Electress, Eleonore Erdmuthe, humiliated every day since her wedding, was relegated to the Hofe (the official residence of the Elector). John George moved into another palace with Magdalena Sybilla.

Desperate to marry his mistress, John George tried to murder his wife, but was prevented by his younger brother, Frederick Augustus. When John George tried to stab Eleonore with a sword, the unarmed Frederick stopped the weapon with his hand, injuring it and leaving him with a lifelong handicap.

== Last Days ==
After a substantial bribe from the elector, on 20 February 1693 Magdalene Sybille was created Countess of Rochlitz (Grafïn von Rochlitz) by Imperial Decree. Shortly before, she gave birth to the only daughter of the couple, Wilhelmina Maria.

But the happiness ended soon: Magdalene Sybille contracted smallpox and died on 4 April 1694, in the arms of the Elector, who was also infected with the disease.

John George died twenty-three days later, on 27 April. He was buried in the Freiberg Cathedral.

Because he died without legitimate issue—Electress Eleonore suffered two miscarriages during their marriage, in August 1692 and February 1693—he was succeeded as elector of Saxony by his brother Frederick Augustus I (who was later king of Poland and Grand Duke of Lithuania as Augustus II the Strong). The new elector took the guardianship of the little orphan Wilhelmina Maria, who was raised in the court. He acknowledged the girl as his niece and gave her a dowry when she was married to a Polish Count.

== Literature ==
- Blaschke, Karlheinz: Johann Georg IV.. In: Neue Deutsche Biographie (NDB). Band 10, Duncker & Humblot, Berlin 1974, ISBN 3-428-00191-5, S. 527 f. (Digitalisat).
- Böttcher, Hans-Joachim: Johann Georg IV. von Sachsen & Magdalena Sibylla von Neitschütz - Eine tödliche Liaison. Dresden 2014. ISBN 978-3-941757-43-1
- Groß, Reiner (2007). Die Wettiner. Stuttgart: Kohlhammer Verlag.
- Flathe, Heinrich Theodor: Johann Georg IV. In: Allgemeine Deutsche Biographie (ADB). Band 14, Duncker & Humblot, Leipzig 1881, S. 384–386.
- Helfricht, Jürgen: Die Wettiner - Sachsens Könige, Herzöge, Kurfürsten und Markgrafen. Sachsenbuch Leipzig 4. aktualisierte Auflage 2007 ISBN 3-89664-044-5
- Kroll, Frank-Lothar: Die Herrscher Sachsens: Markgrafen, Kurfürsten, Könige 1089–1918. Verlag C. H. Beck, München 2007, S. 160 ff. (Digitalisat)
- Sommer, Wolfgang: Die lutherischen Hofprediger in Dresden. Frank Steiner Verlag Stuttgart 2006, S. 236 (Digitalisat)
- Stichart, Franz Otto: Das Königreich Sachsen und seine Fürsten, Leipzig 1854, S. 221 ff.(Digitalisat)
- Wilson, Peter H. (2016). Heart of Europe: A History of the Holy Roman Empire. Cambridge: Harvard University Press.

John George IV House of Wettin Born: 18 October 1668 Died: 27 April 1694
Regnal titles
Preceded by John George III	Elector of Saxony; 1691–1694	Succeeded by Frederick Augustus I
