= John George III of Saxony =

Elector of Saxony from 1680 to 1691

Johann George III
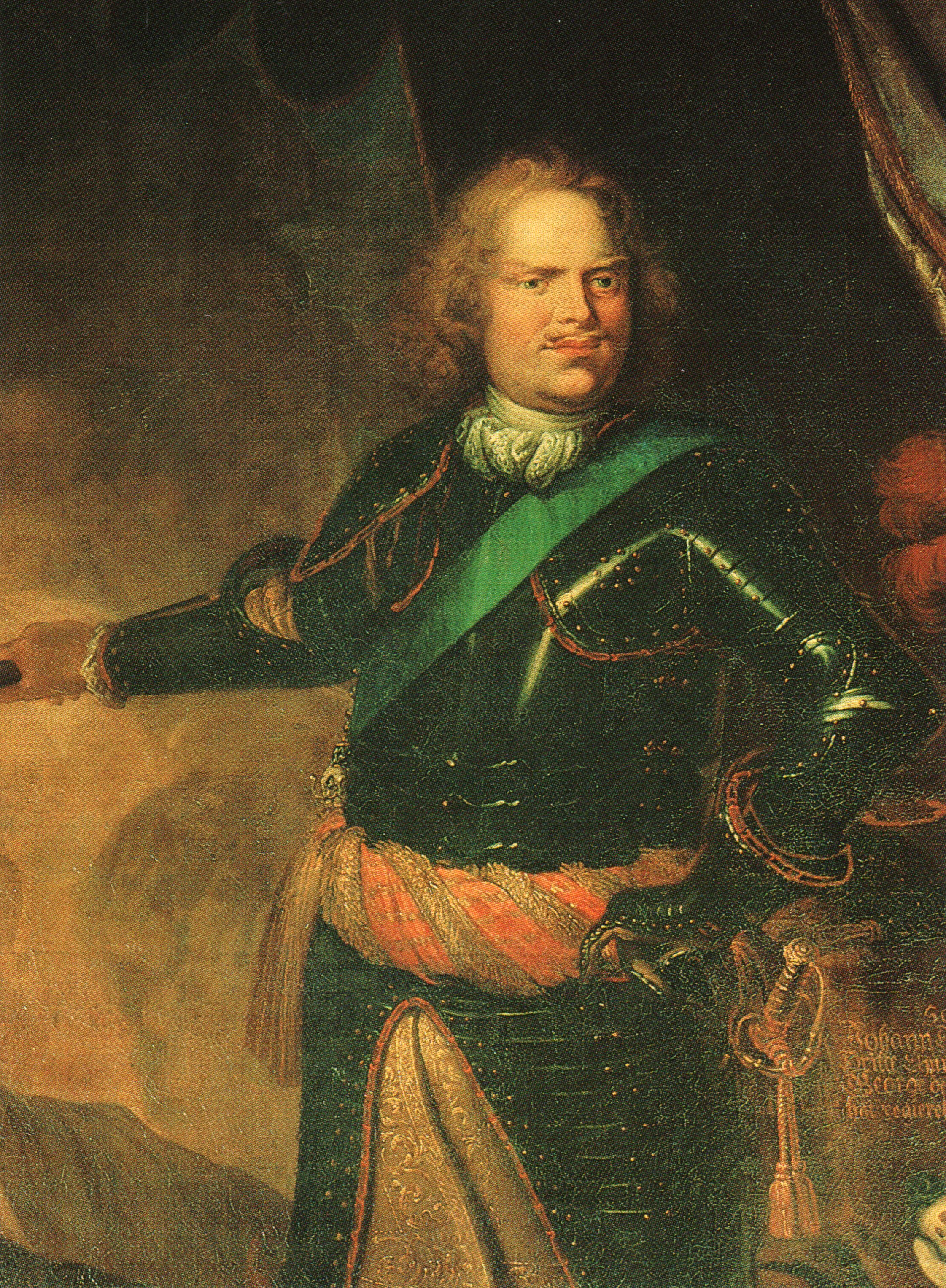
- Portrait, c. 1685

Elector of Saxony
- Reign: 22 August 1680 – 12 September 1691
- Predecessor: John George II
- Successor: John George IV
- Born: 20 June 1647; Dresden, Electorate of Saxony, Holy Roman Empire
- Died: 12 September 1691 (aged 44); Tübingen, Duchy of Württemberg, Holy Roman Empire
- Burial: Cathedral of Freiberg
- Spouse: Anna Sophie of Denmark (m. 1666)
- Issue: John George IV, Elector of Saxony; Augustus II, King of Poland and Grand Duke of Lithuania
- House: Wettin (Albertine line)
- Father: Johann Georg II, Elector of Saxony
- Mother: Magdalene Sybille of Brandenburg-Bayreuth
- Religion: Lutheranism

Johann George III (20 June 1647 – 12 September 1691) was Elector of Saxony from 1680 to 1691. He belonged to the Albertine branch of the House of Wettin.

== Early life ==
Johann Georg III was born in Dresden, the only son of Johann George II and Magdalene Sybille of Brandenburg-Bayreuth.

John George succeeded his father as elector of Saxony when he died, in 1680; he was also appointed Marshal of the Holy Roman Empire. Because of his courage and his enthusiasm for the War he gained the nickname of the "Saxonian Mars".

From his childhood, he learned the typical duties and manners of an heir to the throne. That included not only a strictly Lutheran education but also language tuition and instruction in the art of fortress building and warfare.

In character he resembled his father. He shared his liking for Italian music and theatre. In 1685 John George III met the Venetian opera singer Margarita Salicola and began a relationship; he brought her to Dresden (not only to work, but also as his official mistress). She began a new era for the opera in Saxony, which had previously been dominated by the castrati. In 1686, the pietist Philipp Jakob Spener became the court chaplain in Dresden. But Spener was not generally accepted there and in 1691 he moved to Brandenburg.

Meanwhile, the electorate had recovered from the consequences of the Thirty Years' War. By 1689, Dresden had a population of 21,300 and was becoming less provincial. Four years before, in 1685, the old city of Dresden was destroyed by a fire; later, Wolf Caspar von Klengel and Balthasar Permoser were entrusted by the elector with the reconstruction of the city in the baroque style which was the new fashion at the time.

John George showed a strong interest in the military and even while he was still the heir led Saxon Army forces in the Rhine Campaign of the Franco-Dutch War.

== Career as elector ==
Arms of Saxony

After his accession as Elector, he reduced the size of the royal household and began with the establishment of a small standing army of 12,000 men, after the model of the Margraviate of Brandenburg and managed to extract from the states of the realm a commitment to contribute funds. The Privy War Chancellery (geheime Kriegskanzlei) was set up as the highest military authority. Extreme pressure was used to obtain recruits for the new army. He always neglected home affairs.

In foreign policy, he was less inconstant than his father. He broke off relations with the French crown and strove energetically to win Brandenburg and other German princes for the Imperial war against the French aggressor.

Valued as an ally by the Habsburg court, he was nevertheless viewed with extreme distrust and was not able to overall command of all the imperial troops in the face of a Turkish invasion and he did not obtain the means (food supply and winter accommodation) necessary for the maintenance of his auxiliary troops. There was also the matter of John George's wish for Emperor Leopold I to decide a law case concerning a wooded area in the Ore Mountains (Erzgebirge) in his favour. The Emperor did not grant material support until the siege of Vienna made his situation look increasingly desperate. John George eventually led his 10,400 strong army against the Turks. However, there was strong opposition from the estates of Saxony, not only because this expensive campaign was exhausting the finances of the Electorate of Saxony but also because they were not pleased with this support for the catholic Emperor, who had often proceeded harshly against Protestants in his own country. At Tulln, on the Danube, he joined the Imperial army and they set off for the relief of Vienna. In the ensuing Battle of Vienna (12 September 1683) he commanded the left wing, where he demonstrated great personal courage. The battle call selected by the emperor "Maria Help" (which might carry Roman Catholic connotations) had been previously amended to "Jesus and Maria help" at the request of John George.

King John III Sobieski of Poland-Lithuainia, who also took part in the battle, said of John George: "the Elector of Saxony is an honest man with a straight heart".

John George also accompanied the Emperor after the victory when he entered Vienna. But on 15 September, without taking leave of the Emperor or the other commanders, he set off with his troops on the march back to Saxony, probably as a result of the brusque treatment he had been accorded as a Protestant.

In 1686 he again supported Leopold's Turkish War. For payment of 300,000 thalers, he sent a troop of 5,000 men to the Emperor. In 1685 he had already hired out 3,000 Saxon nationals for 120,000 thalers to the Republic of Venice for their Morean War on the Greek Peloponnese Peninsula.

He did not join the League of Augsburg of 1686 against France, but he did travel personally to The Hague in March 1688, to discuss with Prince William III of Orange, George William, Duke of Brunswick-Lüneburg, and Frederick William, Elector of Brandenburg possible moves against Louis XIV. However, he did not directly support the forthcoming assumption of the English throne by William III.

Following a renewed invasion by France in (1689), he again led his troops into battle to protect Franconia. He later joined the army of Charles V, Duke of Lorraine and took part in the siege of Mainz.

He later had to leave the theatre because of an illness but, against the advice of his physicians and advisors, he returned in May 1690 and with a reinforced alliance with the Emperor, took overall command of the imperial army. Success was limited, however, partly owing to personal skirmishes between John George, the Field Marshal Hans Adam von Schöning and the Austrian commander Aeneas de Caprara; only the crossing of the Rhine at Sandhofen succeeded.

John George died shortly after in Tübingen, where he had been brought, of an epidemic illness, probably Cholera or the Plague. He was buried in the Cathedral of Freiberg.

== Children ==
John George married Anne Sophie, daughter of King Frederick III of Denmark and Norway, in Copenhagen on 9 October 1666. They had two sons:

1. Johann George IV (b. Dresden, 18 October 1668 – died of smallpox, Dresden, 28 May 1694), successor of his father as elector
2. Frederick Augustus I (b. Dresden, 22 May 1670 – died in Warsaw, 1 February 1733), successor of his brother as elector and later king of Poland (as Augustus II).

He also had an illegitimate son by his mistress, the opera singer Margarita Salicola:

1. Johann Georg Maximilian von Fürstenhoff (b. 1686 – d. 15 July 1753), married first to Margareta Dorothea Kühler (d. 1738) and then to a Charlotte Emilie (who identity is unknown). From his first marriage he had two children: a son and a daughter, both unknown; the son apparently died young and the daughter married Philipp Christian von Kleinberg, but both spouses died in 1743.

== Sources ==
- Blaschke, Karlheinz: Johann Georg III.. In: Neue Deutsche Biographie (NDB). Band 10, Duncker & Humblot, Berlin 1974, ISBN 3-428-00191-5, S. 527 (Digitalisat).
- Böttcher, Hans-Joachim: Johann Georg IV. von Sachsen und Magdalena Sibylla von Neitschütz - Eine tödliche Liaison, Dresdner Buchverlag, Dresden 2014, ISBN 978-3-941757-43-1.
- Flathe, Heinrich Theodor : Johann Georg III., Kurfürst von Sachsen. In: Allgemeine Deutsche Biographie (ADB). Band 14, Duncker & Humblot, Leipzig 1881, S. 383 f.
- Groß, Reiner (2007). Die Wettiner. Stuttgart: Kohlhammer Verlag.
- Wilson, Peter H. (2016). Heart of Europe: A History of the Holy Roman Empire. Cambridge: Harvard University Press.

John George III of Saxony House of Wettin Born: 20 June 1647 Died: 12 September 1691
Regnal titles
Preceded by John George II	Elector of Saxony; 1680–1691	Succeeded by John George IV
