= Johann Christoph von Naumann =

Johann Christoph von Naumann (30 March 1664 - 8 January 1742) was a German architect/urban designer who, with Matthäus Daniel Pöppelmann, designed portions of the city of Warsaw, Poland, including the Saxon Axis and other important streetscapes. Between 1729 and 1730 he modernised the town hall at Bautzen, where he had already added the upper storeys to Reichenturm tower in 1718. He worked in remodeling the Opernhaus am Taschenberg in Dresden to the first Catholic Hofkirche.
