= Il Paride =

Opera by Giovanni Andrea Bontempi

- Opera by Giovanni Andrea Bontempi
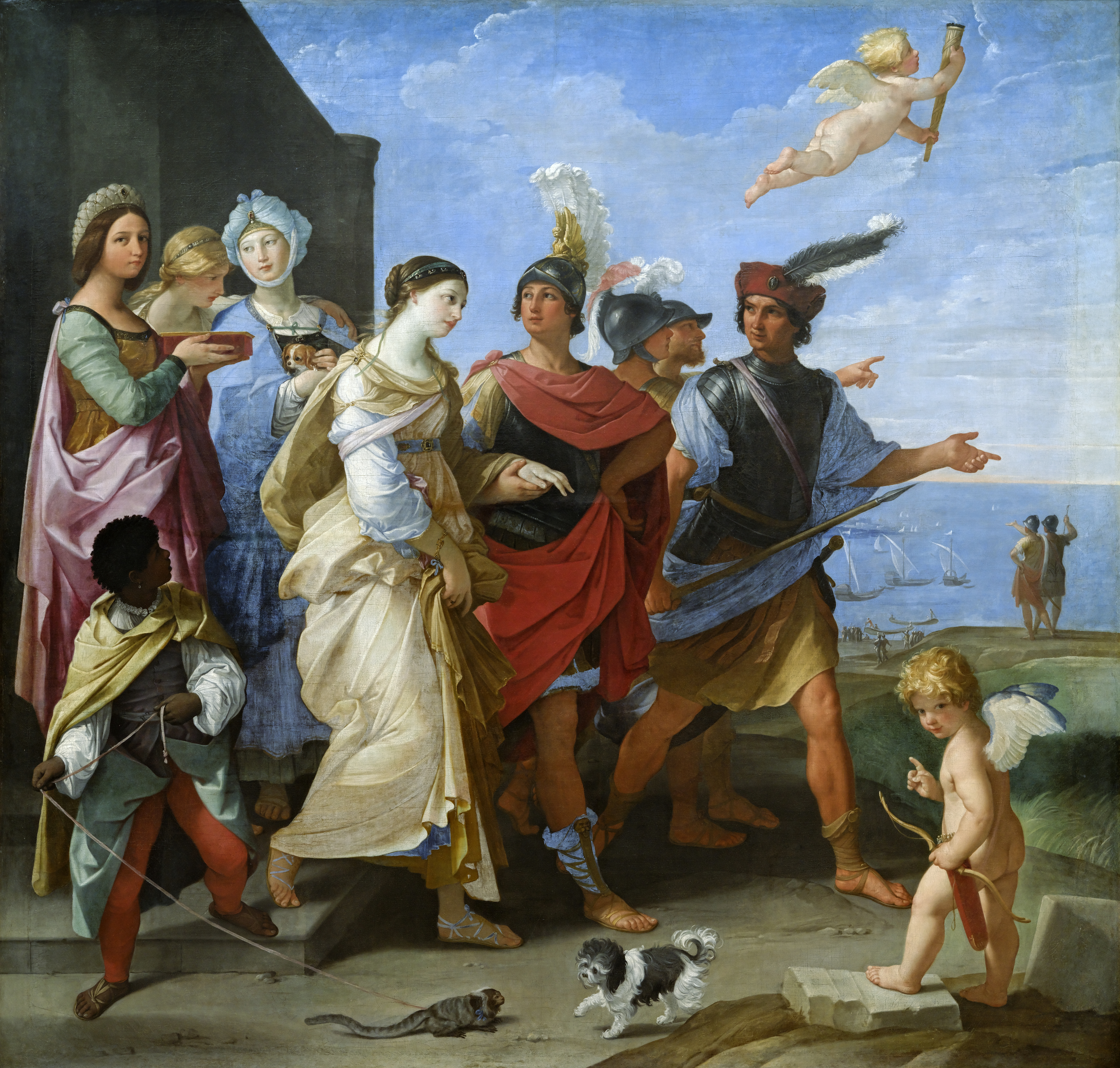
- Helen's abduction by Paris, the opera's central theme
- Librettist: Giovanni Andrea Bontempi
- Language: Italian
- Premiere: 3 November 1662; Dresden Castle

Il Paride is an opera in five acts composed by Giovanni Andrea Bontempi who also wrote the libretto. The first Italian-language opera to be given in Dresden, it was first performed on 3 November 1662 at the Dresden Castle to celebrate the marriage of Erdmuthe Sophie von Sachsen, the daughter of John George II, Elector of Saxony, and Christian Ernst, Margrave of Brandenburg-Bayreuth. The opera was revived on 21 June 2011 at the Potsdam Sanssouci Festival and on 24 August 2012 at the Tyrolean State Theatre as part of the Innsbruck Festival of Early Music.

== Recordings ==
- Il Paride – RAI Orchestra and Chorus, Carlo Franci (conductor). Recorded 24 November 1963, Rome. Label: Voce (LP)
