= Opernhaus am Taschenberg =

Theatre in Dresden, Germany

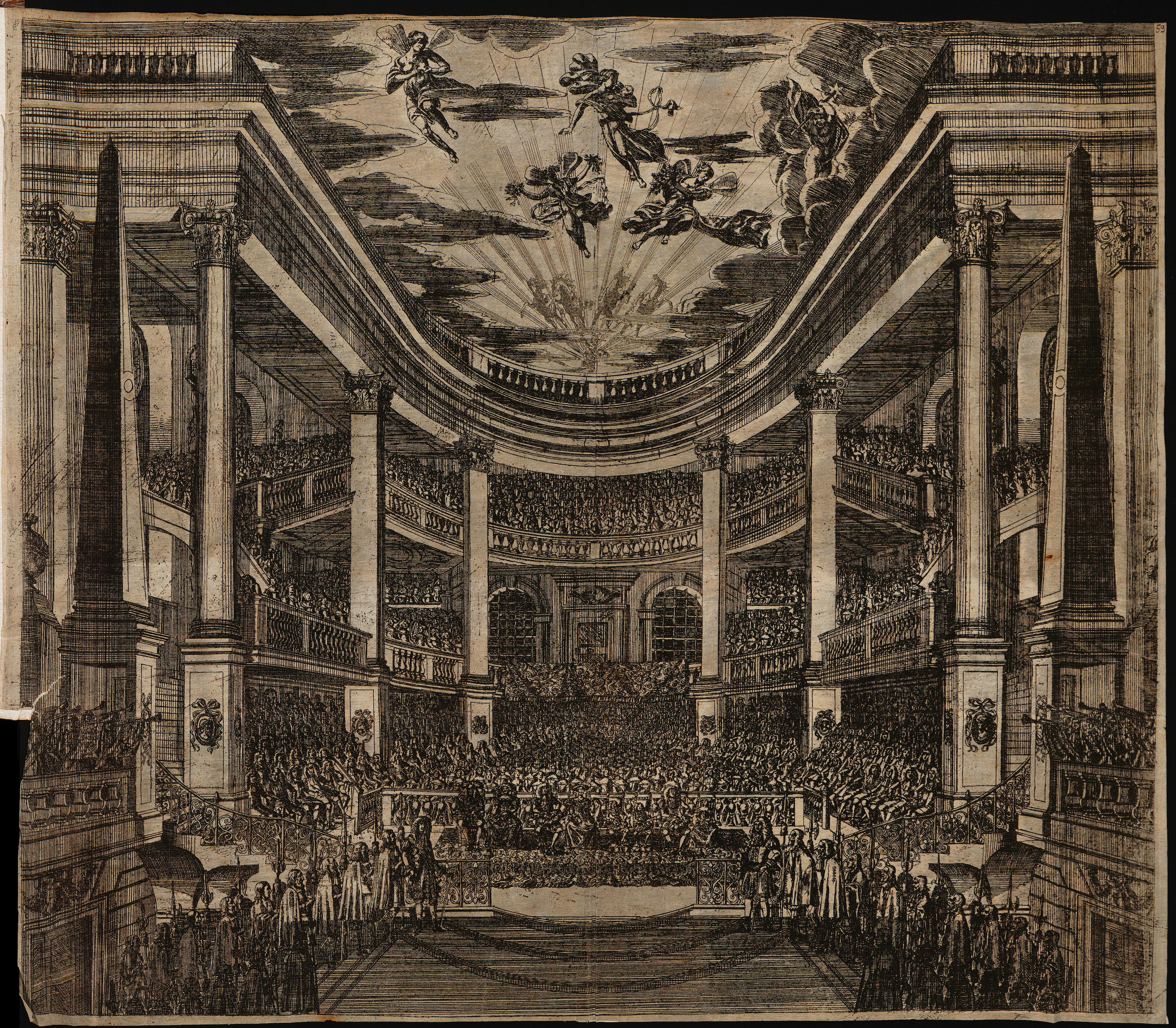
- Interior of the opera house in 1678
- Interactive map of the Opernhaus am Taschenberg area

General information
- Type: Opera house
- Architectural style: Baroque
- Location: Dresden, Saxony
- Coordinates: 51°03′09″N 13°44′09″E
- Construction started: 1664
- Completed: 1667

Design and construction
- Architect: Wolf Caspar von Klengel

The Opernhaus am Taschenberg (Opera house at the Taschenberg) was a theatre in Dresden, Saxony, Germany, built from 1664 to 1667 by Wolf Caspar von Klengel. It was the first opera house of the capital of Saxony, Residenz of the Elector of Saxony. Seating up to 2000 people, it was at the time one of the largest opera houses in Europe. It was also called Klengelsches Opernhaus (after the architect) and Komödienhaus am Taschenberg (Comedy house at the Taschenberg).

Only 40 years after its opening, it was changed to serve as the first Hofkirche (Court church) for the Elector who had converted to the Catholic Church. When a new church was dedicated in 1751 (the present Dresden Cathedral known as the Hofkirche) the building was used as a Ballhaus (a space for playing real tennis) and an archive. It was demolished in 1888.

== Location ==
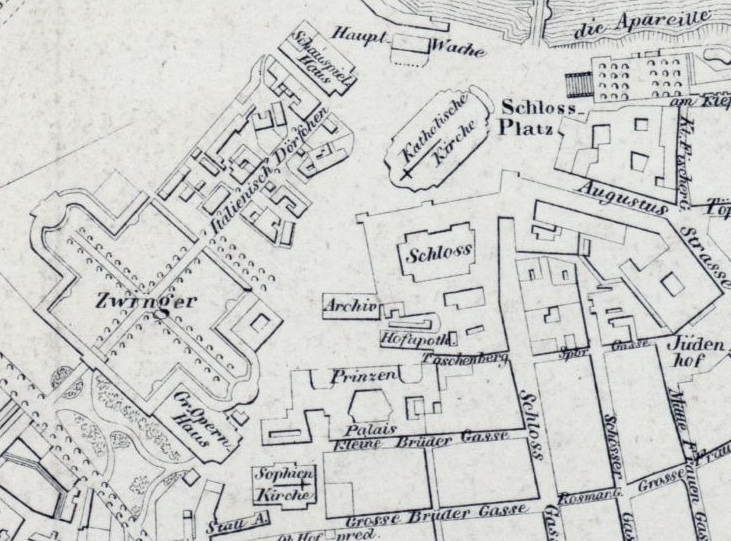
On a map of 1828, the building appears as Archiv.

The opera house was built adjacent to the Dresden Residenz in the south-west, connected by a corridor. The property to the west was empty until construction of the Zwinger began in 1709.

== History of the building ==
=== Court opera ===
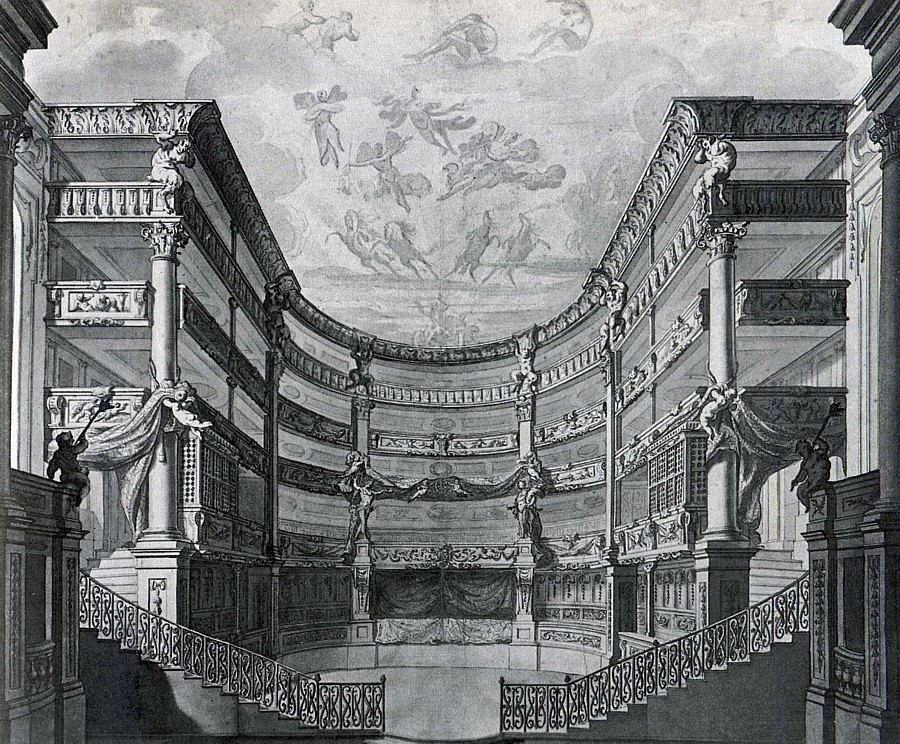
The changed interior in 1691

During the second half of the 17th century, important rulers tried to establish court theatres as separate buildings, to house Baroque opera with an increasing demand for stage sets and decoration, and to seat more people. John George II, Elector of Saxony, commissioned an opera house which was built from 1664 and opened in 1667. It seated almost 2000 people. The first performance was on 27 January 1667 Il teseo by Pietro Andrea Ziani and Giovanni Andrea Moneglia. The premiere of the first extant German opera was on 9 February 1672, Drama oder Musikalisches Schauspiel von der Dafne by Marco Giuseppe Peranda and Giovanni Andrea Bontempi. The exterior of the building in Baroque style was rather simple, built from Elbe Sandstone, but the interior lavishly decorated. The ceiling was painted by Johann Oswald Harms. A proscenium separated the stage and the auditorium. The stage could take ten stage sets. The contemporary Italian historian Gregorio Leti described the hall: "Das Comödienhaus […] mit Bogen, Säulen und Balkonen von Marmor könnte prächtiger nicht sein, als es ist, und es gibt vermutlich kein andres so schön und gediegen erbautes in Europa." (The comedy house with vaults, columns and balconies of marble could not be more magnificent than it is, and there is probably no other in Europe built as beautifully and solidly.) In 1691, the theatre was rebuilt following Italian models with four tiers.

=== Early years of August the Strong's reign ===
Augustus the Strong came into power as elector of Saxony in 1694. In 1696 he ordered a new theatre to be built, giving as a reason the failing acoustics for spoken theatre in the Opernhaus am Taschenberg. The new comedy theatre (Komödienhaus), a wooden construction, was opened in 1697. The same year Augustus had converted to Roman Catholicism in order to ascend the throne in Poland. As a result of his many occupations outside Dresden, theatre life in that city came to a standstill. Only in 1705, for the Carnival season, there were again stagings in both the Opernhaus and the Komödienhaus, but for the Opernhaus these appear to have been the last ones. Taste had changed: The Opernhaus had been built for the abundant theatrical mechanics that were popular in the 17th century. A plan in 1707 to convert the unused Opernhaus into a Ballhaus (a space for playing real tennis) was quickly abandoned.

=== First Catholic Hofkirche (1708-1751) ===
First Catholic Hofkirche
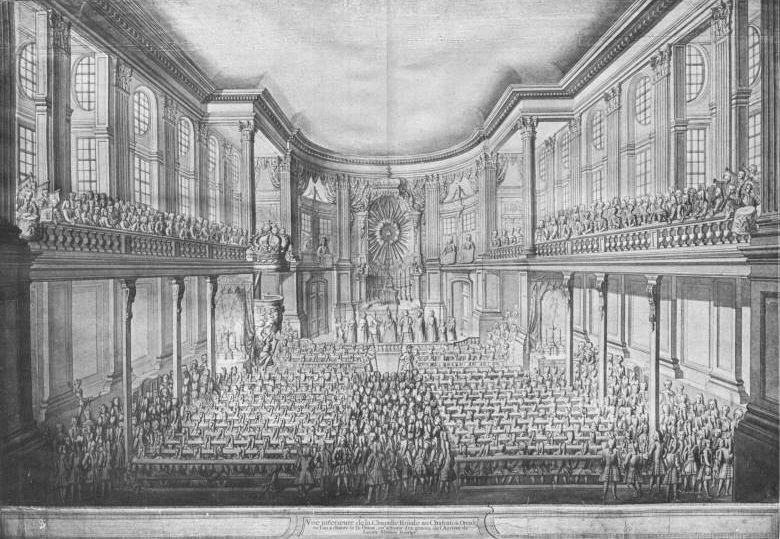
- Interior of the court church in 1719
- Interactive map of the First Catholic Hofkirche area

General information
- Type: Church
- Renovated: 1708
- Closed: 1751
- Demolished: 1888

Design and construction
- Architect: J. C. v. Naumann

Since the elector's conversion to Catholicism, an extensively redecorated space in the palace was used as a court chapel. In 1699 the church of the Moritzburg Castle was remodeled for Catholic worship. In 1707 Augustus the Strong decided that the Opernhaus am Taschenberg should be converted into a Catholic court chapel. Augustus drew plans for the remodeling and supervised its execution. According to some sources the direction of the conversion works was entrusted to Raymond Leplat, other sources indicate that Johann Christoph von Naumann was responsible for these works. It was both a Hofkapelle (with its direct connection to the royal residence) and a Hofkirche (while open to the general public).

On Maundy Thursday 1708 (5 April) the building opened as a Catholic church, which was dedicated to the Heiligste Dreifaltigkeit (Most holy Trinity). The west side of the building, previously the side of the stage, held a choir balcony, which already contained a small organ in 1709. Gottfried Silbermann built an organ in 1720.

The music performed in the church received universal acclaim. From 1717 Antonio Lotti directed an Italian opera ensemble which also supplied the church music on special occasions. From 1720 Kapellmeister Johann David Heinichen, assisted by Jan Dismas Zelenka and Giovanni Alberto Ristori, worked on building a repertory of Catholic church music. In 1733, Johann Sebastian Bach dedicated a Kyrie–Gloria Mass in B minor to the elector, a work suitable for the church service at the Hofkirche which he developed much later to the Mass in B minor. From 1734, the new Kapellmeister Johann Adolf Hasse had to supply music performed by the court chapel on every Sunday and holiday of the liturgical year, assisted by Johann Michael Breunig from 1746 and Johann Georg Schürer from 1748.

A new opera house was built at the Zwinger, the Opernhaus am Zwinger, which opened in 1719. By 1738 the Hofkirche was regarded as being too cramped and too distant from the quarters where the monarch lived. In July 1739 the building of the new Hofkirche was started, and in July 1751 the Catholic church function was transferred to that new building.

=== Civilian functions (1751-1888) ===
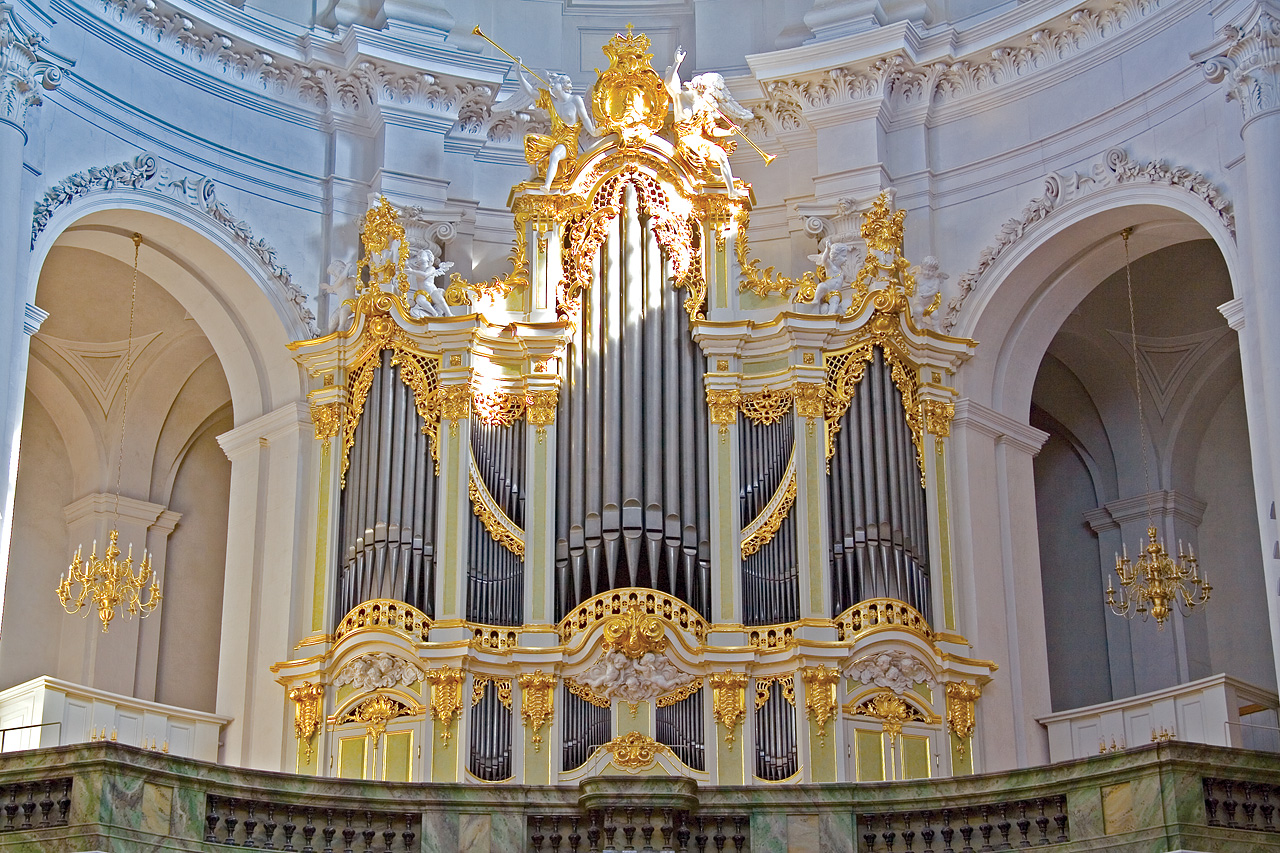
The organ Silbermann was building in the new Hofkirche, when working and living in the former Opernhaus am Taschenberg

When Gottfried Silbermann was commissioned to build the organ of the new Hofkirche, he was allotted the now empty former opera house and church building to use as a workshop and private residence for the period of these works. Silbermann died there in 1753; the organ was only completed the next year.

In 1755, it was decided the building should be remodeled as a venue for ball games, for which the conversion works were completed in 1757. Charles of Saxony, Duke of Courland, one of the last remaining enthusiasts of real tennis, paid for an extensive roof repair in the 1770s. After his death in 1796, the building was used for storing firewood for a few years.

In 1802, it was decided the building should be remodeled to house an archive. Johann Gottlob Hauptmann added a classicist facade. Further changes to its construction, encountering more difficulties than initially expected, took until 1808. It remained an archive until it was demolished eighty years later.

== Cited works ==
Ermisch, Hubert (1888). Das alte Archivgebäude am Taschenberge in Dresden (in German). Dresden.

Yo Tomita, Robin A. Leaver and Jan Smaczny, ed. (2013). Exploring Bach's B-minor Mass. Cambridge University Press. ISBN 1-10-700790-9.
