= Heinrich Christoph Fehling =

German painter

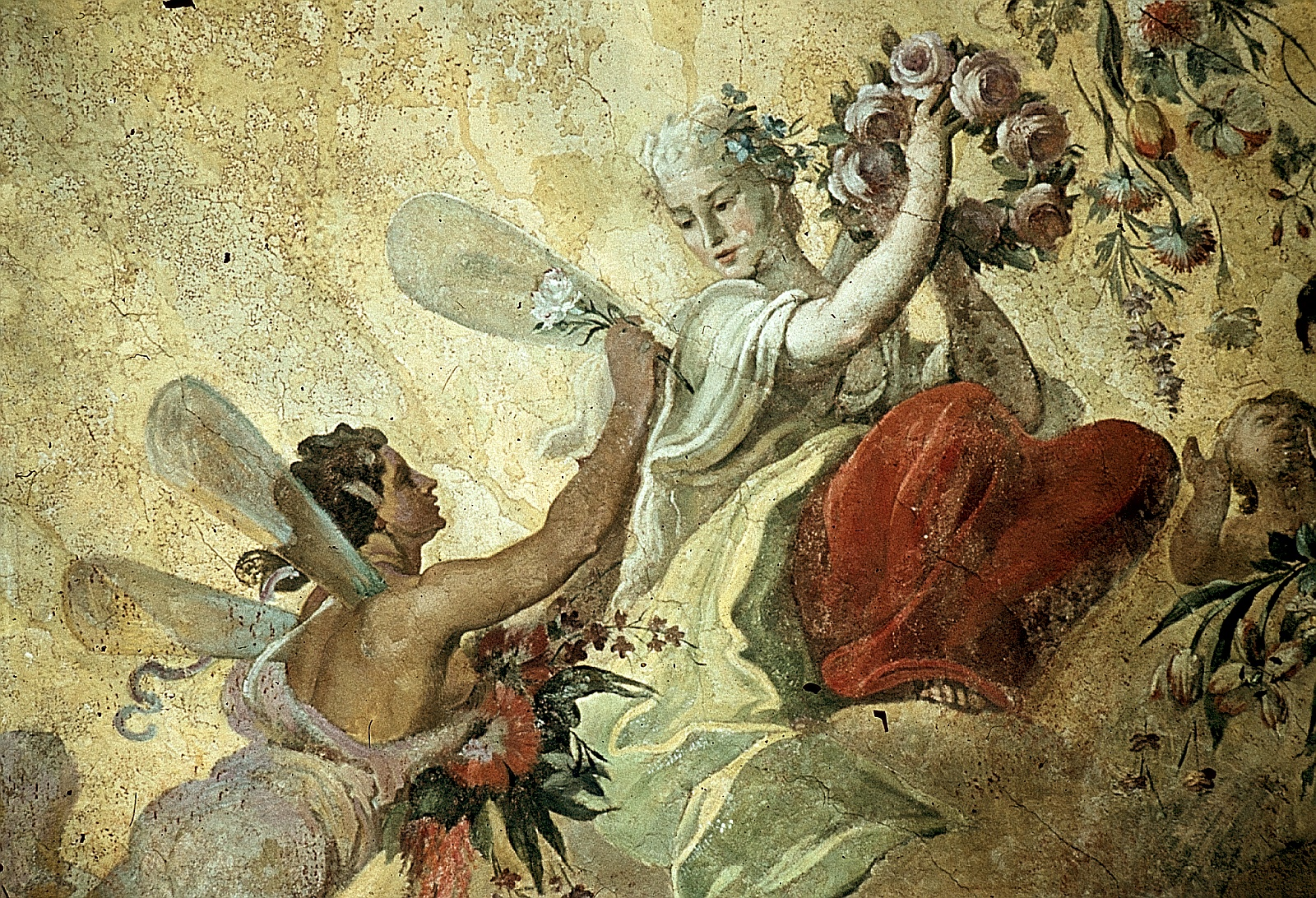
Genies, ceiling painting in the Marmorhall of the French Pavilion of the Zwinger

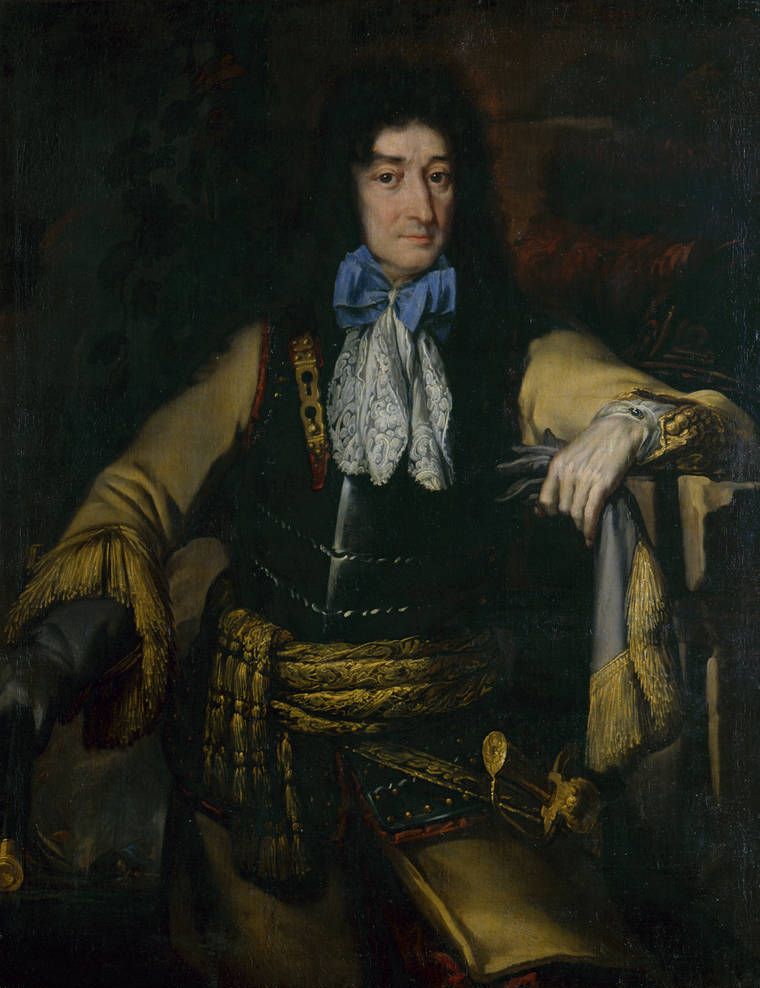
Portrait of architect Wolf Caspar von Klengel, ca. 1680

Heinrich Christoph Fehling (1653–1725) was a German painter born at Sangerhausen, in Thuringia. He was instructed by Bottschildt, to whom he was related. After having lived several years in Italy, he was appointed court-painter to the Elector John George IV, and became director of the Academy and inspector of the Art Galleries at Dresden, where he died in 1725. In the Dresden Gallery is a portrait by him of Colonel Wolf Caspar von Klengel, and a number of painted ceilings remain as specimens of his art in the palaces of that city.
