= Giovanni Andrea Bontempi =

Giovanni Andrea Bontempi (ca. 1624 – 1 July 1705) was an Italian castrato singer, later composer, historian, music theorist, and assistant kapellmeister to Heinrich Schütz at Dresden from 1657. He was born Giovanni Andrea Angelini, in Perugia but later took the surname of his patron Cesare Bontempi. His Il Paride was the first Italian-language opera to be given in Dresden. It was first performed in November 1662 at the Dresden Castle to celebrate the marriage of Erdmude Sophia, the daughter of the Elector of Saxony, and Christian Ernst, Count of Brandenburg. He composed two other operas, both of which also premiered in Dresden: Dafne performed in 1671 to open the Opernhaus am Taschenberg, and Jupiter und Jo first performed in 1673.

Bontempi spent the last years of his life in Brufa (near Perugia) and is buried in the chapel of SS. Cosma e Damiano there.

== Works, editions and recordings ==
- New Method of Composing For Voices, by means of which one thoroughly ignorant of the art of music can begin to compose (1660)
