= Wolf Caspar von Klengel =

German architect (1630–1691)

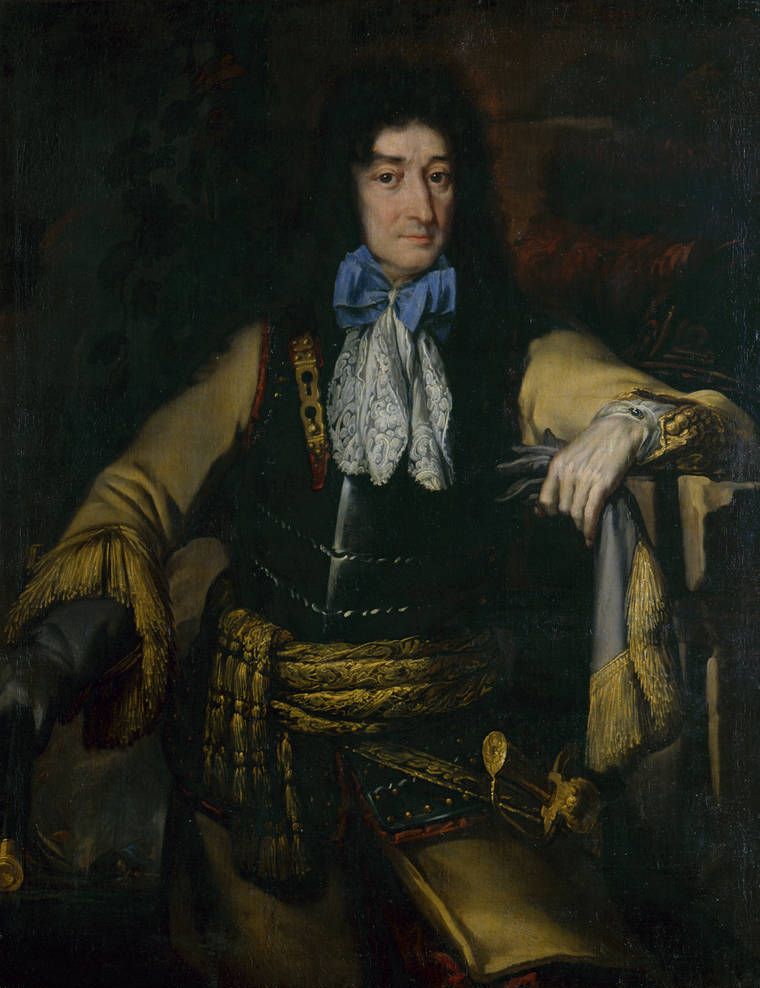
Portrait of Klengel by Heinrich Christoph Fehling, c. 1680.

Wolf Caspar Klengel, from 1664 von Klengel (8 June 1630 – 10 January 1691), was a German architect in Saxony.

== Biography ==
Wolf Caspar von Klengel was born in 1630 in Dresden as the son of the electoral councillor and chief tax accountant Caspar Klengel and his wife Sabina Elisabeth, née Fischer. Klengel's maternal grandparents were the captain of the Saxon Life Guards, Wolfgang Fischer, and the granddaughter of the famous court architect Paul Buchner, who worked in Saxony.

Wolf Caspar von Klengel had a thorough education at secondary school or even grammar school level. As part of his privately organised education, he learned good Latin and Greek as well as modern subjects such as mathematics and drawing.

Klengel set off on his first journey abroad at a young age, on 2 June 1647. It took him via Hamburg to Amsterdam, Leyden and The Hague. Via Brussels, he arrived in Paris on 16 May 1648, where he attended the Duc de Beaufort's military academy for the summer. In addition to training in military engineering, he learnt French and also studied contemporary journalism. He briefly returned to Dresden via Rouen and Hamburg in 1650.

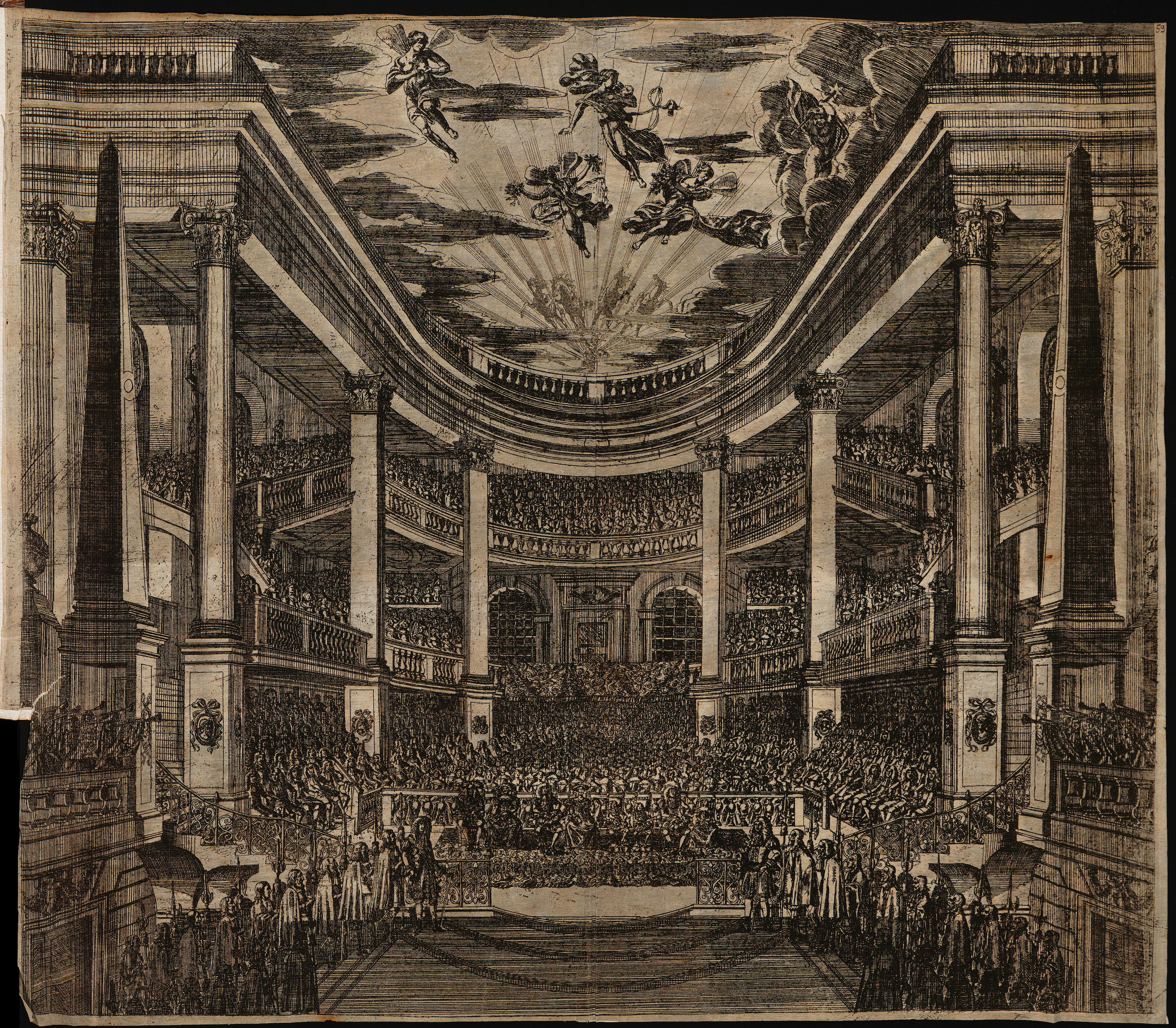
Dresden Opera house on the Taschenberg

In 1651, Klengel set off on a major three-year trip to Italy, which took him to Venice, Florence and Rome. In Rome, he became friends with the famous Jesuit and polymath Athanasius Kircher. From southern Italy, Klengel also travelled to Malta. There he is said to have taken part in the campaigns of the Maltese against the Berbers. In 1654–1655, as a captain in Venetian service, he was responsible for their Dalmatian fortresses.

After his return from Italy, he was first appointed master builder in Dresden in 1656 and later, in 1672, chief inspector of civil and military buildings under the Saxon electors Johann Georg II (1613–1680) and Johann Georg III. Until his death, he also acted as supervisor of the electoral art chamber, for which he purchased numerous works, including a painting by Peter Paul Rubens.

On 16 April 1664, Wolf Caspar and his brothers were elevated to the imperial nobility by Emperor Leopold I.

On 23 April 1689, he was appointed General Constable of Electoral Saxony.

Klengel's first major project was the redecoration of the electoral living and state rooms in the west wing of the Dresden Residential Palace. Several design drawings and small remnants of the stucco decoration have survived.

From 1664 to 1667, Klengel built the first permanent opera house in the royal seat, the opera house on the Taschenberg with seating for around 2000 spectators, next to the Residenzschloss in Dresden.

Between 1667 and 1669, he built the Johann-Georgen Bastion in front of Georgenburg Castle at Königstein Fortress and refurbished St George's Chapel, built in 1515, between 1671 and 1676 (tower, roof, altar, pulpit).

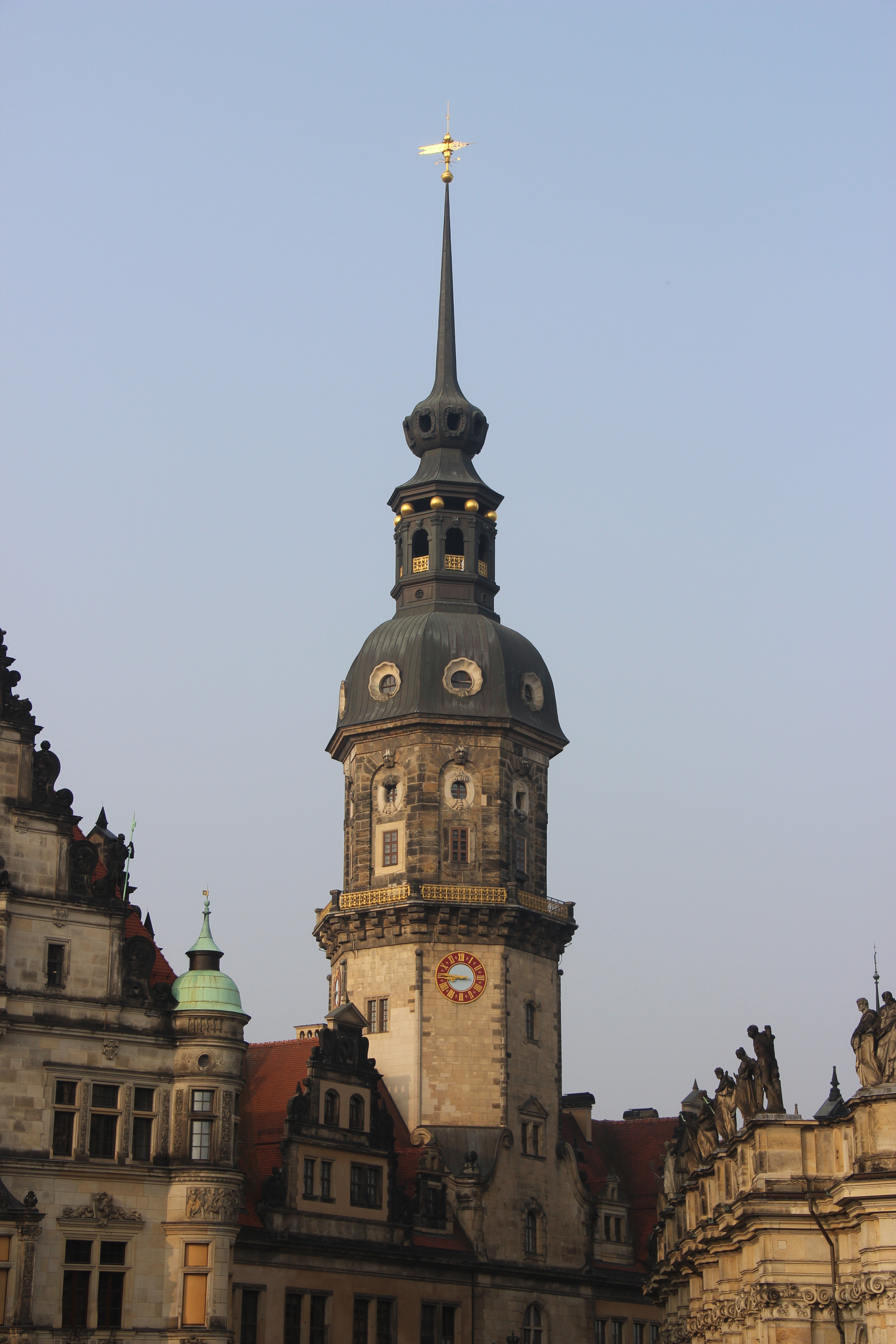
The Hausmannsturm of Dresden Palace (1674/76)

In 1672, he built the chapel at Moritzburg Castle and created the furnishings that still exist today. Other works include the High House (now the Spitzhaus) above the Hoflößnitz, the elevation of the Hausmann Tower of the Dresden Residential Palace in 1674–1676, including the baroque dome, and the electoral riding school at Dresden Palace in 1677–1678. Shortly before his death, he began work on the Green Gate on the north side of the Hausmann Tower.

When almost the entire present-day Innere Neustadt of Dresden was destroyed in the Altendresden fire of 1685, Klengel drew up the plans for its reconstruction. The crooked alleyways were to be replaced by a spacious network of streets to create a more representative effect. For example, a wide street was laid out between the Markt (now Neustädter Markt) and the Schwarzes Tor (now Albertplatz), which is now Hauptstraße.

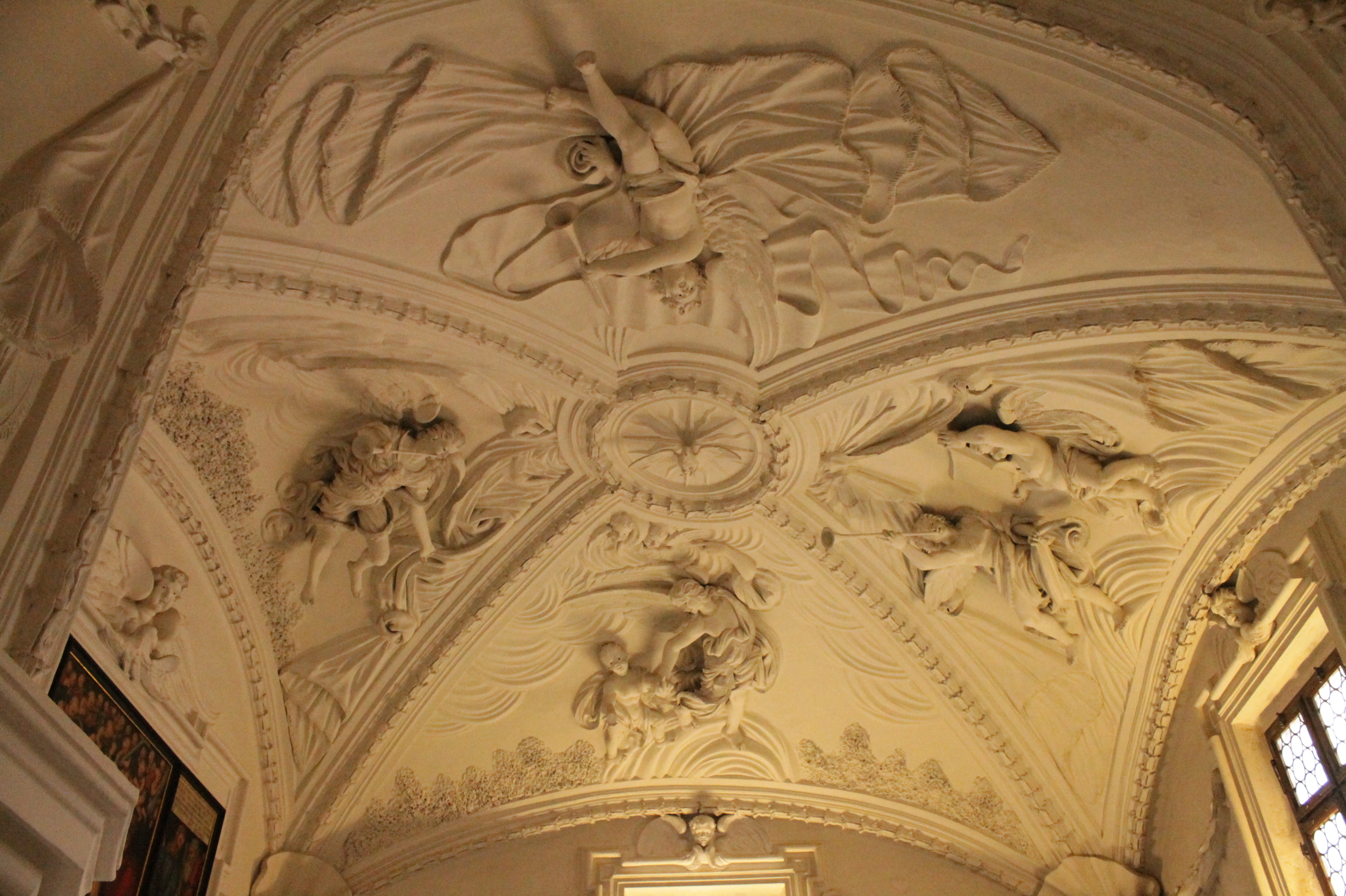
Wolf Caspar von Klengel's ceiling to the Georgskapelle in Meissen Cathedral

In 1677 he remodelled the Georgskapelle in Meissen Cathedral where George the Bearded is buried.

Between 1675 and 1686, the Bleesern electoral stud farm near Wittenberg and the Holy Trinity Church in Carlsfeld near Eibenstock in the Ore Mountains were built according to his design in 1684–1688.

Klengel probably also designed the building plans for the manor house of the Hohenprießnitz manor, which his brother Christian von Klengel (1629–1693) had built in 1677–1678, as well as for the village church in Eutzsch near Wittenberg, which was commissioned by Wittenberg University in 1688. He was probably also involved in the design of the palace in the Great Garden in the 1670s, as many of his favourite architectural motifs can be found here.

In 1688, he was commander of Sonnenstein Castle near Pirna and had it converted into a fortress.

== Literature ==
- Eberhard Hempel: Unbekannte Skizzen von Wolf Caspar von Klengel, in: Abhandlungen der Sächsischen Akademie der Wissenschaften zu Leipzig. Phil.-hist. Klasse, Bd. 59, H. 4, Berlin 1958.
- Steffen Delang: Das Dresdner Schloß in der zweiten Hälfte des 17. Jahrhunderts, in: Das Dresdner Schloß. Monument sächsischer Geschichte und Kultur, Dresden 1989, S. 68–71.
- Hermann Heckmann: Baumeister des Barock und Rokoko in Sachsen, Berlin 1996, S. 32–43.
- Mario Titze: Baugeschichte und Baugestalt der Dreifaltigkeitskirche in Carlsfeld im Erzgebirge, in: Die Dresdner Frauenkirche, Jahrbuch Bd. 3, Weimar 1997, S. 131–141.
- Mario Titze: Das ehemalige kurfürstlich-sächsische Gestüt Bleesern. Ein Bauwerk Wolf Caspar von Klengels, in: Denkmalpflege in Sachsen-Anhalt, 1998/1, S. 53–59.
- Günter Passavant: Wolf Caspar von Klengel, Dresden 1630–1691. Reisen – Skizzen – Baukünstlerische Tätigkeiten, München/Berlin 2001, ISBN 3-422-06299-8.
- Stephan Reinert: Das ehemals Landsbergersche Spitzhaus – ein Bau Wolf Caspar von Klengels? In: Heinrich Magirius, ed. (2001). 600 Jahre Hoflößnitz. Historische Weingutanlage (in German). Dresden: Sandstein Verlag. pp. 105–109. ISBN 3-930382-60-1.
- Mario Titze: Neue Forschungen zum Vorwerk Bleesern, Ldkr. Wittenberg, in: Burgen und Schlösser in Sachsen-Anhalt, Heft 11/2002, S. 368–383.
