= Magdalena Sibylla of Neidschutz =

German noblewoman

Magdalena Sibylla of Neidschütz
- Countess of Rochlitz
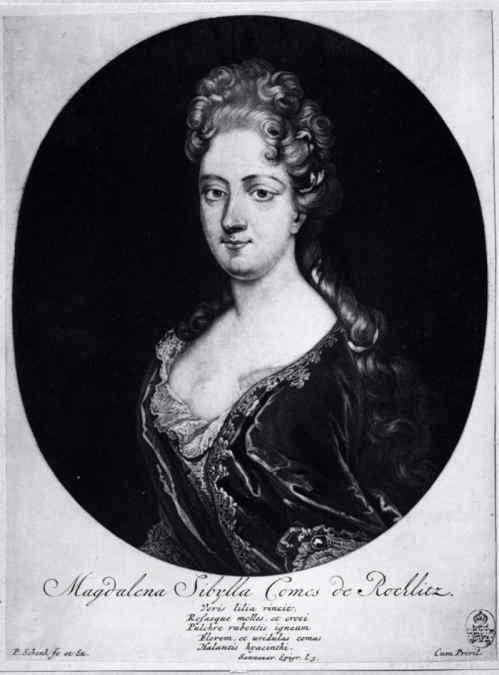
- Magdalena Sibylla of Neidschutz
- Full name: Magdalena Sibylla of Neidschutz
- Born: 8 February 1675
- Died: 14 April 1694 (aged 19); Dresden
- Issue: Frederica of Rochlitz
- Father: Colonel Rudolf of Neidschutz (officially); John George III, Elector of Saxony (suspected)
- Mother: Ursula Margarethe of Haugwitz

Magdalena Sibylla of Neidschütz (8 February 1675 – 14 April 1694), later Countess of Rochlitz, was a German noblewoman and the mistress of John George IV, Elector of Saxony. She was the first ever Official Mistress (Favoritin) of an Elector of Saxony.

== Early life ==
Magdalena Sibylla, called Billa, was the daughter of Ursula Margarethe of Haugwitz (1650–1713), who had at one time been the mistress of John George III, Elector of Saxony. By order of the Elector, Ursula married Colonel Rudolf of Neidschütz (1627–1703), member of an old Saxon nobility, who officially appears as the father of Billa, though there were rumors that Billa was in fact the child of Johann George. If this had been true, it would have made Billa half-sister of her lover, John George IV.

== Official mistress ==
Billa became mistress of John George IV in late 1691. By order of his mother, he was forced to marry, in April 1692, in an attempt to break up the affair. Instead, immediately after he assumed the Electorate, he openly lived with Billa, and she became the first ever Official Mistress (Favoritin) of an Elector of Saxony. John George abandoned his wife in the official residence and moved into another palace with Billa.

== Imperial Countess ==
On 20 February 1693, Leopold I gave her the title Reichsgräfin von Rochlitz.

== Issue ==
She had an illegitimate daughter with John George IV:

- Countess Wilhelmine Marie Friederike of Rochlitz (summer 1693 – after 1729): married to Count Peter Dunin (1680=-1736) and had issue.

== Death ==
She died in Dresden of smallpox, in the arms of John George IV, who himself became infected with the disease and died 23 days later.

== Literature ==
- Böttcher, Hans-Joachim: Johann Georg IV. von Sachsen & Magdalena Sibylla von Neitschütz – Eine tödliche Liaison, Dresdner Buchverlag 2014, ISBN 978-3-941757-43-1.
