= Margarita Salicola =

Italian opera singer

Margarita Salicola (floruit 1682 – 1706) was a famous opera singer of her time. She came from a family of musicians at the court of the Ferdinando Carlo Gonzaga, Duke of Mantua and became a staple of casts at San Giovanni Grisostomo, Venice's newest and most famous theater, in the 1680s. The earliest work with which she can be linked is Pietro Simone Agostini's Il ratto delle Sabine (The Rape of the Sabine Women). She was especially praised for her appearance in the title role of Carlo Pallavicino's Penelope la casta (The Chaste Penelope) in the winter of 1685. The Saxon elector Johann Georg III, in whose court Pallavicino already served, was so thrilled by her performance that he became intent to taking her and two castrati from the same cast into this service. After a staged "kidnapping," Salicola was escorted en route to Dresden by a Mantuan agent.

As a "dame of honor" in the Saxon court, she quickly won fame in Dresden, but she traveled back to Italy often and continued to perform into the early eighteenth century. Despite the many works in which she appeared, Penelope remained the one for which she was best remembered.
