= Freiberg Cathedral =

Church in Freiberg, Germany

Coordinates: 50°55′13″N 13°20′36″E

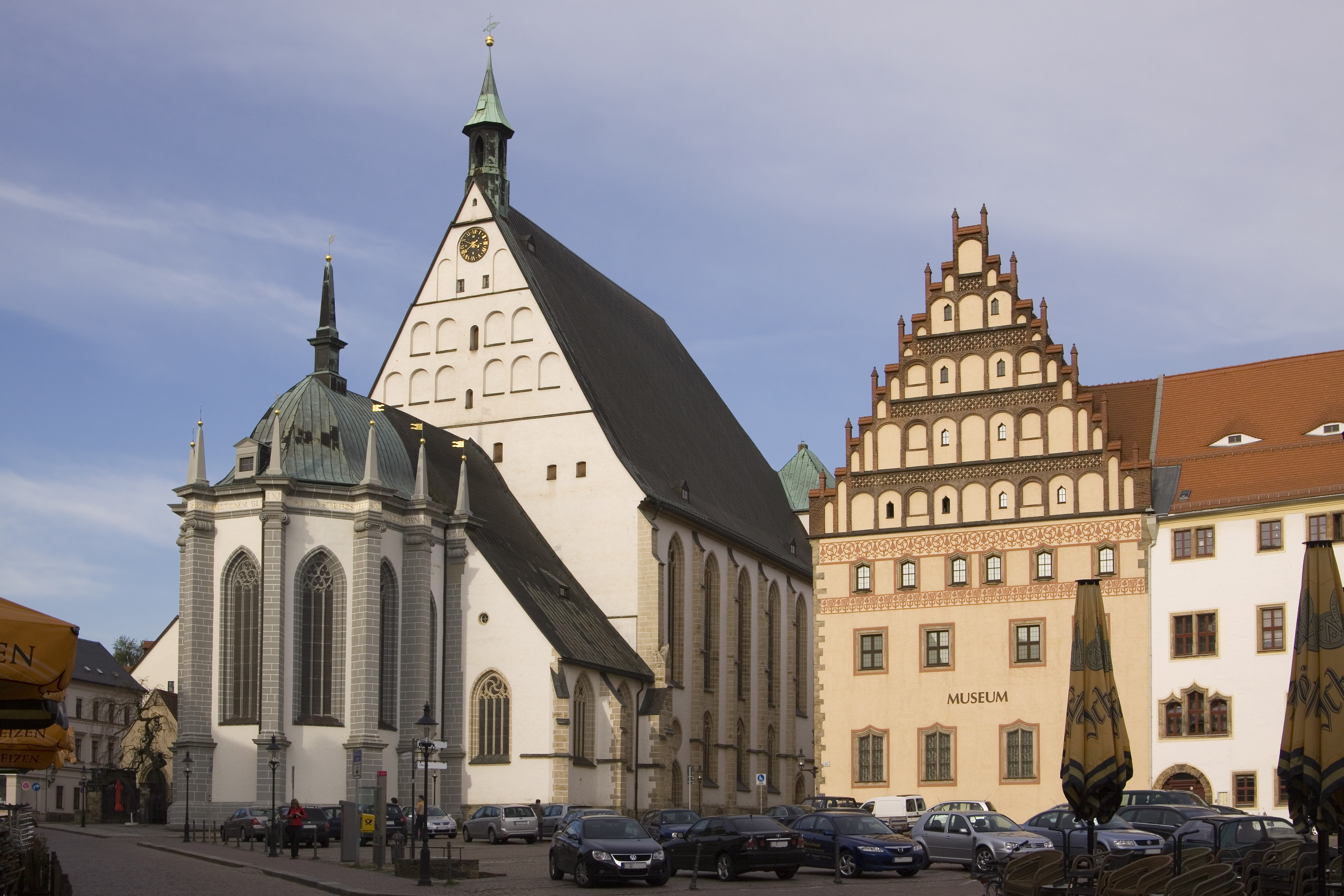
Freiberg Cathedral seen from the Untermarkt

The Freiberg Cathedral or Cathedral of St Mary (German: Dom St. Marien) is a church of the Evangelical-Lutheran Church of Saxony in Freiberg in Saxony. The term Dom, a German synecdoche used for collegiate churches and cathedrals alike, is often uniformly translated as cathedral into English, even though this church here was a collegiate church, not a cathedral (seat of a bishop).

== History ==
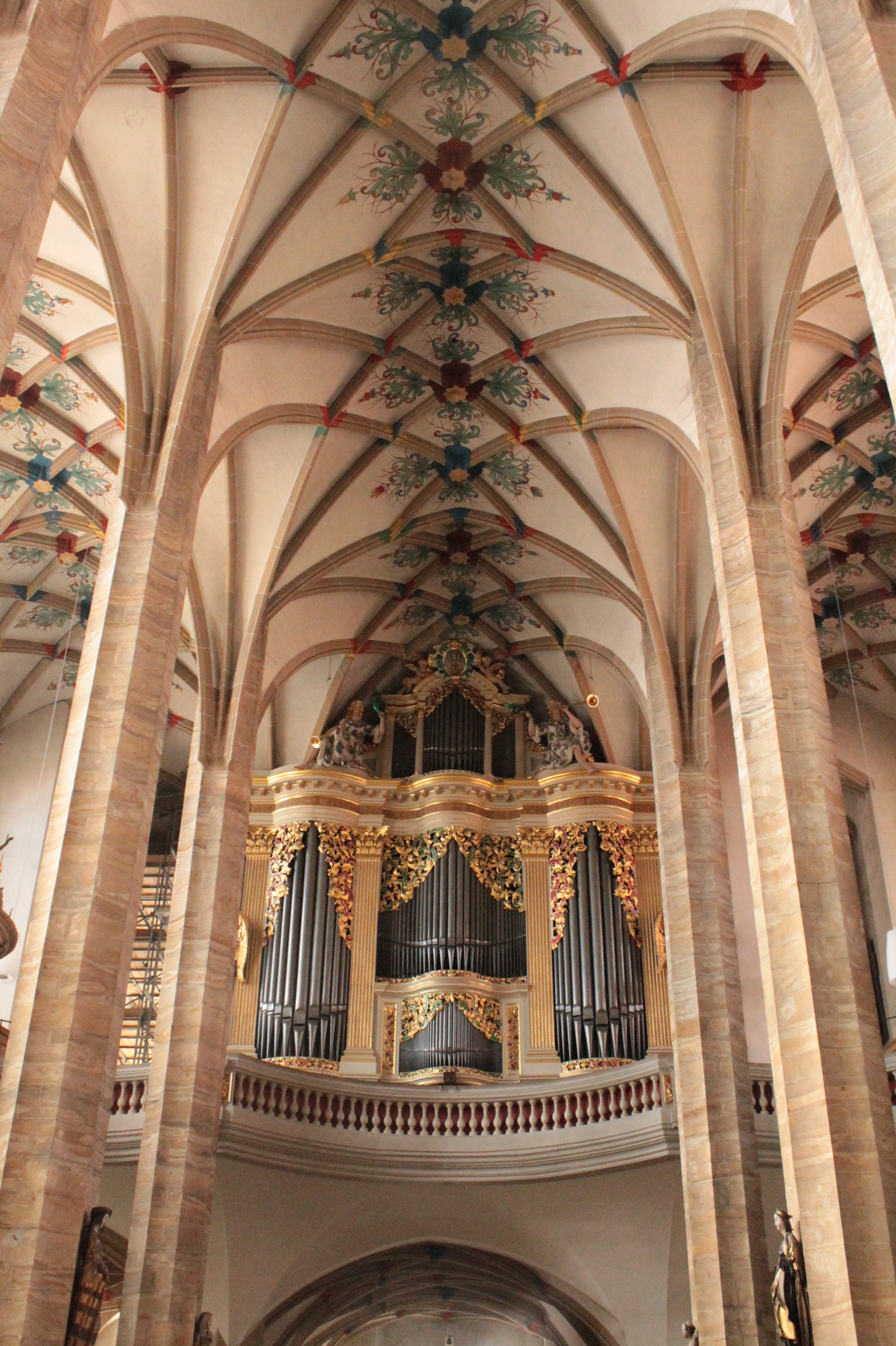
Organ and ceiling, Freiberg Cathedral, Germany

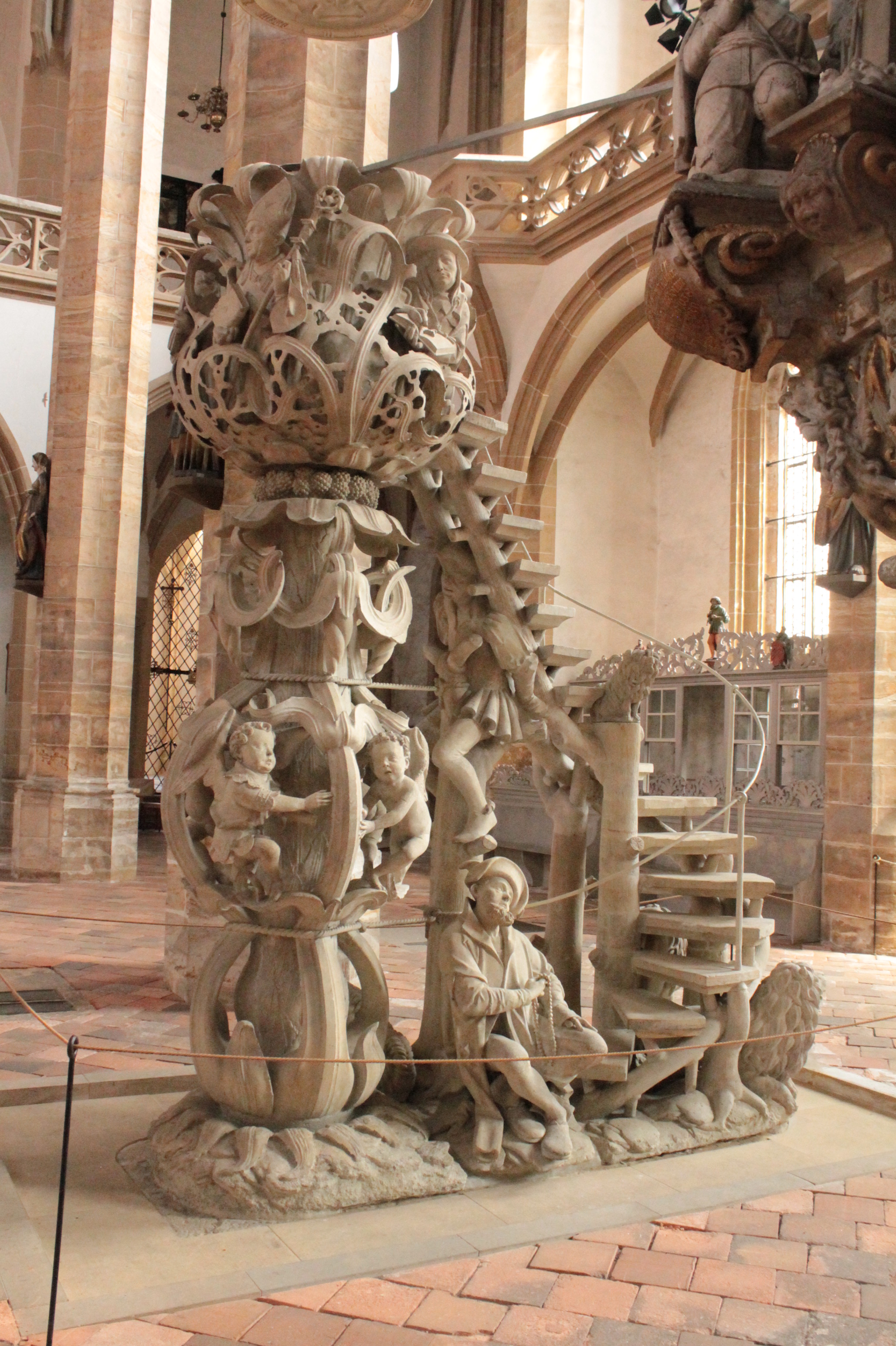
Open fretwork pulpit, Freiberg Cathedral

Around 1180, the basilica "of Our Lady" was built in Freiberg, which was developing rapidly due to the silver that had recently been found in the Ore Mountains. Two significant works of art that are still conserved were added very early: the Triumphkreuzgruppe crucifixion group (around 1225) and the Goldene Pforte (Golden Gate). In 1480, the church was turned into a Collegiate church, which earned the church the naming Dom, in German used for collegiate churches and cathedrals alike. However, the college was dissolved after only 57 years due to the Reformation in the Electorate of Saxony.

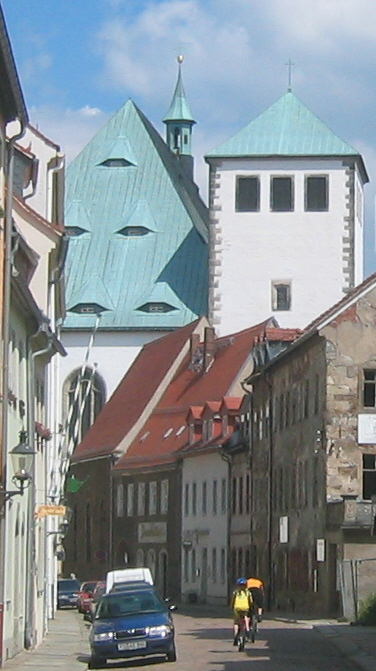
Freiberg Cathedral

In the great fire of 1484, the church was almost completely destroyed. However, the crucifixion group, golden gate, and parts of the quire were preserved. The Cathedral of St. Mary was built at the same location as a triple-naved Gothic hall church. A remarkable feature are the two adjacent pulpits in the central nave: the free-standing Tulpenkanzel (Tulip pulpit) from 1505, made by sculptor Master H.W. of a light type of the Tuff from Chemnitz-Hilbersdorf and the Bergmannkanzel (Miner's pulpit) of 1638 created by Hans Fritzsche of a Saxon sandstone.

== Interior ==
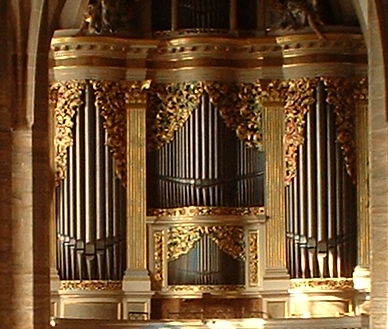
Gottfried Silbermann organ at Freiberg Cathedral

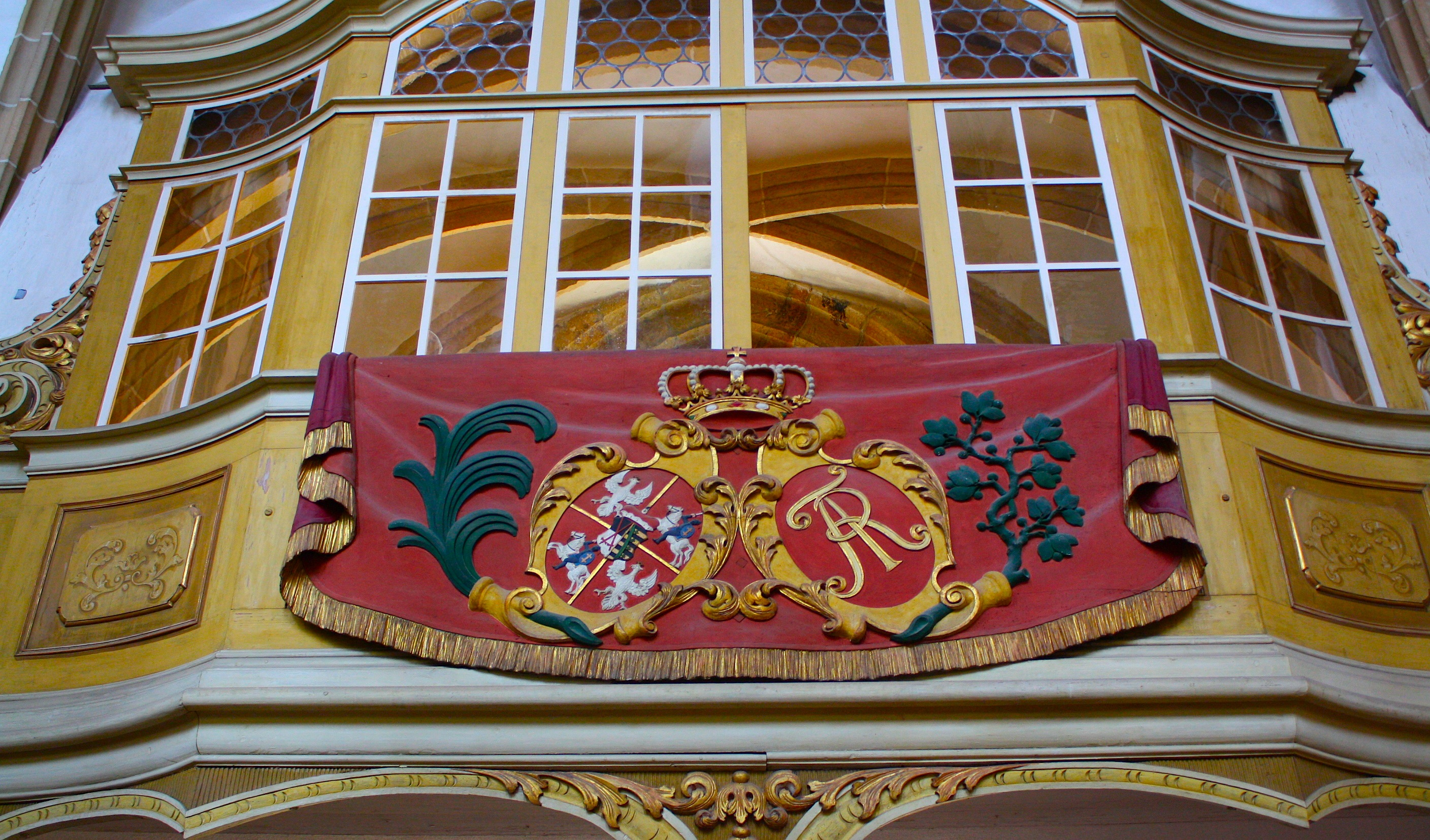
The electoral box of the Polish king Augustus II the Strong

Between 1541 and Augustus II the Strong's conversion to Catholicism, nine rulers of Saxony were buried in the quire of the cathedral. August's mother and her sister are buried in the sisters' crypt in the All Saints chapel. Their tomb, created by the Saxon Baroque sculptor Balthasar Permoser, had originally been situated in the Lichtenburgk Monastery at Prettin, but was moved to Freiberg in 1811. Another noteworthy feature is the monument honoring Maurice, Elector of Saxony, who is also buried in the Freiberg Cathedral.

Several monumental brasses form the floor of the quire. The walls are decorated with a wealth of epitaphs and sculptures of the ducal house. The design of the ceiling is a combination of painting and sculpture in the style of Italian mannerism. The transition between wall and ceiling is formed by a multitude of musical angels on the uppermost ledge of the epitaph architecture. Analysis has shown that the instruments used are real Renaissance instruments or excellent imitations. This was very useful, since no other instruments of this time were extant. These finds were examined in Leipzig, and replicas were built. Even the imitations were detailed enough to serve as a blueprint for replicas, and these instruments were relevant to allow the reproduction of the typical sound of an orchestra of the time.

A special attraction for organ enthusiasts is the organ by Gottfried Silbermann with its three manuals, 44 organ stops and 2574 organ pipes. Opposite of it is another, smaller Silbermann organ, which is also an instrument.

The cathedral has six church bells, four of which are from the famous Hilliger casting house. The heaviest of the bells is the Große Susanne at 5 tons.

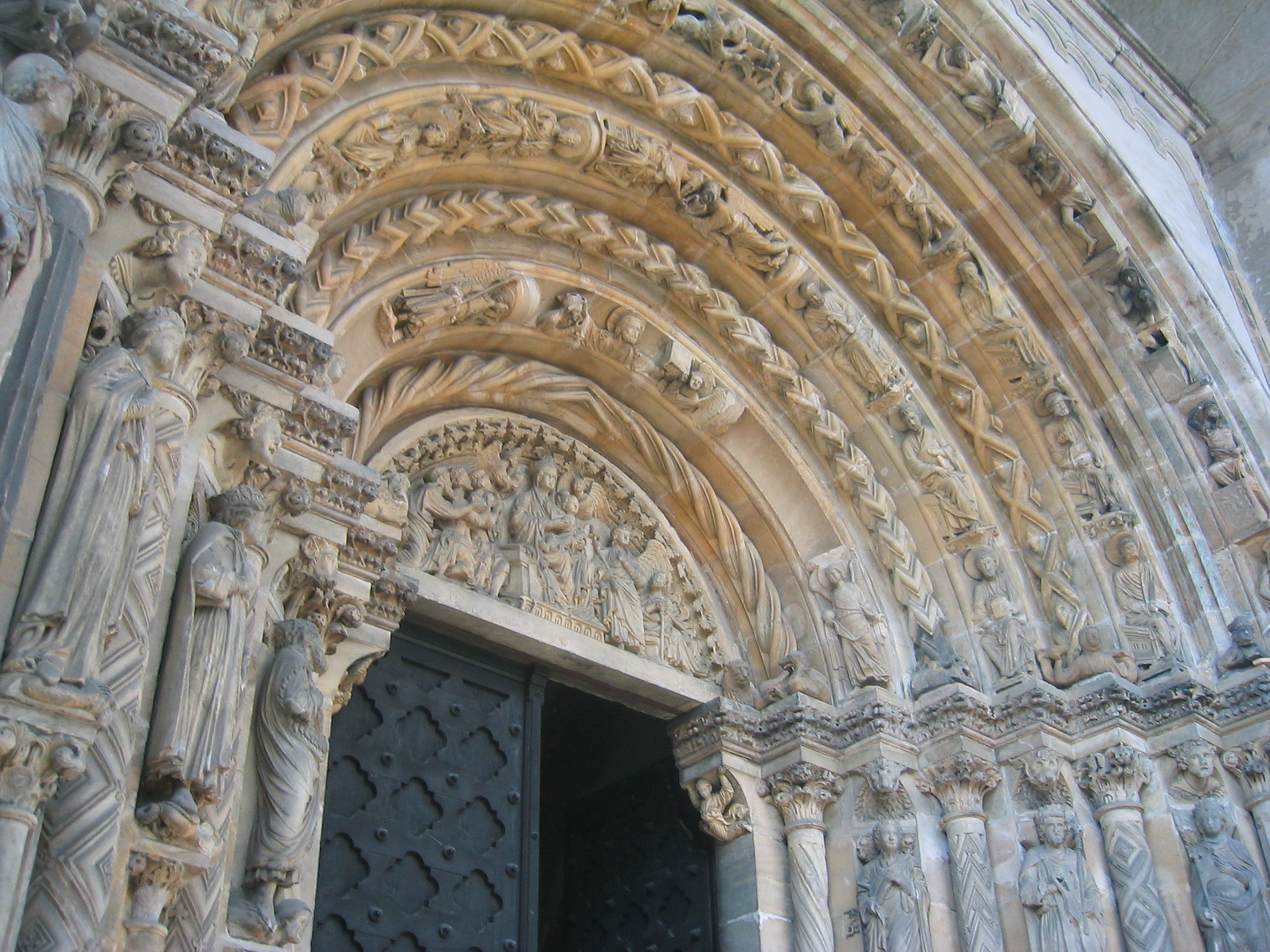
Golden Gate

The Golden Gate is a late Romanesque arched sandstone portal on the southern side of the cathedral, adorned by sculptures and richly ornamented columns that were originally richly colorated. To protect the gate from environmental influences, an extension was built in 1902/03.

The cathedral is still used for services by the congregation. It can be visited daily for a fee in guided tours.

== The organ ==
=== The Great Organ ===
Built sometime between 1711 and 1714, the Freiberg Cathedral organ is an amalgamation of the French and German styles of organ building. The reeds are voiced in the French style, but the foundation stops, the stops which sound at the notated pitch, are reinforced in a way that is typical of the German style. Also, the Quintadehn (Quintadena) stops (stops which sound the third partial particularly strongly) and conical reed stops bear German influences as well.

The organ was originally tuned using the meantone system of tuning, and was tuned to A=473 Hz. Today, the tuning system is a slight variation of meantone tuning, and A has more or less been kept at its original frequency; it is now at 476 Hz.

The organ was not much modified over the course of Silbermann's lifetime: the influence of Silbermann's students who maintained the organ against Silbermann's wishes (he had a dispute with the leadership of Freiburg), lack of funds for retuning in the early 1800s, and the protests of the organist when the church again attempted to retune the organ a few decades later all contributed to the preservation of the organ more or less as it was built. However, in the early 1900s, the 8' Quintadehn stop was rebuilt due to tin disease, and the reeds were worked on a few years later.

In the 1950s and the years following, various efforts were made to restore the organ to its original state. It still contains the four wedge bellows which were part of its original design, and can be pumped by a blower or by hand.

Stoplist
Hauptwerk (II. Manual) (C. D - c3)	Oberwerk (III. Manual)	Brustwerk (I. Manual)	Pedal (C. D - c1)	Additional features
BORDUN. 16 F. PRINCIPAL. 8 F. VIOLA DI GAMBA. 8 F. ROHRFLÖT. 8 F. OCTAVA 4 F. QVINTA 3 F. SUP.OCTAV. 2 F. TERTIA. CORNET. (5fach, ab c1) MIXTUR (4fach) ZIMBELN. (3fach) TROMPET. 8 F. CLARIN 4 F.	QVINTADEHN. 16 F. PRINCIPAL. 8 F. GEDACKT 8 F. QVINTADEHN. 8 F. OCTAVA. 4 F. SPITZFLÖT. 4 F. SUP.OCTAV. 2 F. FLASCHFLÖT. 1 F. ECHO. 5.FA. (ab c1) MIXTUR. (3fach) ZIMBELN. (2fach) KRUMBHORN. 8 F. VOX HUMANA (8 F.)	GEDACKT. 8 F. PRINCIPAL. 4 F. ROHRFLÖT. 4 F. NASSAT. 3 F. OCTAVA. 2 F. TERTIA. QVINTA. 1 1/2 F. SUFFLÖT. 1 F. MIXTUR. (3fach)	UNTERSATZ 32 F. (32+16 F.) PRINC.BASS. 16 F. SUB BASS. 16 F. OCTAV BASS. 8 F. OCTAV BASS. 4 F. PED.MIXTUR. (6fach) POSAUN BASS. 16 F. TROMP.BASS. 8 F. CLAR.BASS. 4 F.	TREMULANT. (I, II, III) SCHWEBUNG (III) Shift couplers (III/II, I/II)

=== The Small Organ ===
This 1-manual and pedal organ was built in 1719 for St. John's church. However, in the 1930s, St. John's Cathedral fell into such a state of disrepair that its collapse became a major concern. In order to spare the organ, cantor Arthur Eger arranged for its removal, and it was installed in the Dom. St-Marien Cathedral.

The organ was tuned in equal temperament during an 1857 repair by Karl Traugott Stöckel. It is a relatively small organ (especially compared to the organs of 100 stops or more of today) of 14 stops, 11 of which are in the manuals, and the remainder in the pedals.
