= List of margraves and electors of Brandenburg =

Rulers of Brandenburg in 1157-1806

Coat of arms of the Margraviate of Brandenburg.

This article lists the Margraves and Electors of Brandenburg during the time when Brandenburg was a constituent state of the Holy Roman Empire.

The Mark, or march, of Brandenburg was one of the primary constituent states of the Holy Roman Empire. It was created in 1157 as the Margraviate of Brandenburg by Albert the Bear, Margrave of the Northern March. In 1356, by the terms of the Golden Bull of Charles IV, the Margrave of Brandenburg was given the permanent right to participate in the election of the Holy Roman Emperor with the title of Elector (German: Kurfürst).

The early rulers came from several different dynasties, but from 1415 Brandenburg and its successor states were ruled by the House of Hohenzollern for over 500 years. From 1618 onward, Brandenburg was ruled in personal union with the Duchy of Prussia. The Hohenzollerns raised Prussia to a kingdom as the Kingdom of Prussia in 1701, and from then on Brandenburg was de facto treated as part of the kingdom even though it was legally still part of the Holy Roman Empire. The titles of Margrave of Brandenburg and Elector of Brandenburg were abolished along with the Holy Roman Empire in 1806, and Brandenburg was formally integrated into Prussia. Despite this, the Prussian kings still included the title "Margrave of Brandenburg" in their royal style. From 1871 to 1918, the Hohenzollerns were also German Emperors.

== Margraves and Electors of Brandenburg ==
=== House of Ascania ===
==== Partitions of Brandenburg under Ascanian rule ====
Margraviate of Brandenburg (1157-1266/1267)
Krossen (1266–1308)	Stendal (1266–1318)	Neumark (1266–1318)	Salzwedel (1267–1317)	Stargard (1267–1316)
Margraviate of Brandenburg (Neumark then Stendal lines) (1318–1320)				Annexed to the Duchy of Mecklenburg

==== Table of rulers ====
Ruler	Born	Reign	Death	Ruling part	Consort	Notes
Albert I the Bear	c.1100	1157–1170	18 November 1170	Margraviate of Brandenburg	Sophie of Winzenburg; 1124 thirteen children	First Margrave who founded a dynasty in Brandenburg. Ruler of the Northern March from 1134.
Otto I	1128	1170–1184	8 July 1184	Margraviate of Brandenburg	Judith of Poland; 1148 two children Ada of Holland; 1175 one child	Ruled together with his father since 1144.
Otto II the Generous	c.1150	1184–1205	4 July 1205	Margraviate of Brandenburg	Unmarried	Left no descendants, and the Margraviate went to his brother.
Albert II	1177	1205–1220	25 February 1220	Margraviate of Brandenburg	Matilda of Lusatia (1185–1225); 1205 four children	Brother of the previous.
Regencies of Henry I, Count of Anhalt (1220–1225), Albert I, Archbishop of Magdeburg (1220–1221), Matilda of Lusatia (1221–1225)						Children of Albert II, ruled jointly, but their children divided the margraviate.
John I	1213	1220–1266	4 April 1266	Margraviate of Brandenburg	Sophie of Denmark (1217–1247); 1230 six children Brigitte Jutta of Saxony (d. 4 April 1266); 1230 six children	Children of Albert II, ruled jointly, but their children divided the margraviate.
Otto III the Pious	1215	1220–1267	9 October 1267	Margraviate of Brandenburg	Beatrice of Bohemia; 1243 six children	Children of Albert II, ruled jointly, but their children divided the margraviate.
John II	1237	1267–1281	10 September 1281	Margraviate of Brandenburg (at Krossen)	Hedwig of Werle (1243–1287) c. 1260 two children	Children of John I. Despite co-rulership between them, they received different parts in the Margraviate to rule (alone or in co-rulership): John II received a seat at Krossen; Otto IV received a seat at Stendal; Conrad received a seat at Neumark and associated his eldest son in 1286 (who predeceased him).
Otto IV of the Arrow	1238	1267–1308	27 November 1308	Margraviate of Brandenburg (at Stendal)	Heilwig of Holstein-Kiel (d. 1305); 1279 no children Judith of Henneberg (d. 1315); 1308 no children	Children of John I. Despite co-rulership between them, they received different parts in the Margraviate to rule (alone or in co-rulership): John II received a seat at Krossen; Otto IV received a seat at Stendal; Conrad received a seat at Neumark and associated his eldest son in 1286 (who predeceased him).
Conrad I	1240	1267–1304	1304	Margraviate of Brandenburg (at Neumark)	Constance of Greater Poland; 1260; Santok three children	Children of John I. Despite co-rulership between them, they received different parts in the Margraviate to rule (alone or in co-rulership): John II received a seat at Krossen; Otto IV received a seat at Stendal; Conrad received a seat at Neumark and associated his eldest son in 1286 (who predeceased him).
Otto VII	c. 1260	1286–1297	1297	Margraviate of Brandenburg (at Neumark)	Unmarried	Children of John I. Despite co-rulership between them, they received different parts in the Margraviate to rule (alone or in co-rulership): John II received a seat at Krossen; Otto IV received a seat at Stendal; Conrad received a seat at Neumark and associated his eldest son in 1286 (who predeceased him).
John III of Prague	1213	1267–1268	4 April 1266	Margraviate of Brandenburg (at Salzwedel)	Unmarried	Children of Otto III. Despite co-rulership between them, they received different parts in the Margraviate to rule (alone or in co-rulership): John III (and then Otto V with Otto VI) received the seat at Salzwedel, from which Otto VI abdicated in 1286; Albert III received a seat in Stargard (which he ruled alone at least from 1284.
Otto V the Tall	1246	1267–1298	1298	Margraviate of Brandenburg (at Salzwedel)	Judith of Henneberg-Coburg (1252–1327); 22 October 1268 four children	Children of Otto III. Despite co-rulership between them, they received different parts in the Margraviate to rule (alone or in co-rulership): John III (and then Otto V with Otto VI) received the seat at Salzwedel, from which Otto VI abdicated in 1286; Albert III received a seat in Stargard (which he ruled alone at least from 1284.
Otto VI the Short	3/17 November 1264	1267–1286	6 July 1303	Margraviate of Brandenburg (at Salzwedel)	Hedwig of Habsburg; February 1279; Vienna no children	Children of Otto III. Despite co-rulership between them, they received different parts in the Margraviate to rule (alone or in co-rulership): John III (and then Otto V with Otto VI) received the seat at Salzwedel, from which Otto VI abdicated in 1286; Albert III received a seat in Stargard (which he ruled alone at least from 1284.
Albert III	c. 1250	1267–1300	Between; 19 September and 4 December 1300	Margraviate of Brandenburg (at Stargard)	Matilda of Denmark(d. 1300); 1268 four children	Children of Otto III. Despite co-rulership between them, they received different parts in the Margraviate to rule (alone or in co-rulership): John III (and then Otto V with Otto VI) received the seat at Salzwedel, from which Otto VI abdicated in 1286; Albert III received a seat in Stargard (which he ruled alone at least from 1284.
Conrad II	1261	1281–1308	1308	Margraviate of Brandenburg (at Krossen)	Unmarried	With his childless death his land reverted to Stendal.
Herman the Tall	1275	1298–1308	1 February 1308	Margraviate of Brandenburg (at Salzwedel)	Anne of Austria; 1295; Graz four children	Children of Otto V, divided the land. Beatrice's part was then annexed to the Duchy of Świdnica-Jawor.
Beatrice (I)	1270	1298–1316	1316	Margraviate of Brandenburg (at Upper Lusatia)	Bolko I, Duke of Świdnica; 4 October 1284; Berlin ten children Władysław, Duke of Bytom; 21 September 1308 two children	Children of Otto V, divided the land. Beatrice's part was then annexed to the Duchy of Świdnica-Jawor.
Beatrice (II)	c.1270	1300–1314	22 September 1314	Margraviate of Brandenburg (at Stargard)	Henry II, Lord of Mecklenburg; 1292; Stargard Castle four children	Daughter and heiress of Albert III. Her marriage transferred the Stargard region into the Duchy of Mecklenburg.
John IV	1261	1304–1305	1305	Margraviate of Brandenburg (at Neumark)	Unmarried	Co-ruler of his father since 1291. His childless death reverted his lands to Stendal.
Henry I Lackland	21 March 1256	1308–1318	14 February 1318	Margraviate of Brandenburg (at Delitzsch since 1297; at Stendal since 1308)	Agnes of Bavaria; 1303 three children	Younger brother of John II, Otto IV and Conrad I. Started his co-rulership in 1297, receiving seat at Delitzsch; he ended up as successor of his childless elder brother Otto IV.
Regency of Waldemar, Margrave of Brandenburg-Stendal (1308–1316)						Children of Herman, divided the land: John V received the core of Salzwedel; Matilda received a seat at Lower Lusatia; Agnes received a seat at Altmark; Jutta received a seat at Coburg.; John's childless death left the main core of Salzwedel to be reunited by his regent, Valdemar. The remaining possessions were annexed by the respective marriages.
John V the Illustrious	1302	1308–1317	26 March 1317	Margraviate of Brandenburg (at Salzwedel)	Unmarried	Children of Herman, divided the land: John V received the core of Salzwedel; Matilda received a seat at Lower Lusatia; Agnes received a seat at Altmark; Jutta received a seat at Coburg.; John's childless death left the main core of Salzwedel to be reunited by his regent, Valdemar. The remaining possessions were annexed by the respective marriages.
Matilda	1296	1308–1329	31 March 1329	Margraviate of Brandenburg (at Lower Lusatia)	Henry IV, Duke of Żagań; 5 January 1310 four children	Children of Herman, divided the land: John V received the core of Salzwedel; Matilda received a seat at Lower Lusatia; Agnes received a seat at Altmark; Jutta received a seat at Coburg.; John's childless death left the main core of Salzwedel to be reunited by his regent, Valdemar. The remaining possessions were annexed by the respective marriages.
Agnes	1297	1308–1334	27 November 1334	Margraviate of Brandenburg (at Altmark)	Waldemar, Margrave of Brandenburg-Stendal; 1309 no children Otto, Duke of Brunswick-Lüneburg; 1319 no children	Children of Herman, divided the land: John V received the core of Salzwedel; Matilda received a seat at Lower Lusatia; Agnes received a seat at Altmark; Jutta received a seat at Coburg.; John's childless death left the main core of Salzwedel to be reunited by his regent, Valdemar. The remaining possessions were annexed by the respective marriages.
Judith	1301	1308–1353	1353	Margraviate of Brandenburg (at Coburg)	Henry IX, Count of Henneberg-Schleusingen; 1 January 1317 or 1 February 1319 five children	Children of Herman, divided the land: John V received the core of Salzwedel; Matilda received a seat at Lower Lusatia; Agnes received a seat at Altmark; Jutta received a seat at Coburg.; John's childless death left the main core of Salzwedel to be reunited by his regent, Valdemar. The remaining possessions were annexed by the respective marriages.
Waldemar the Great	1280	1305–1318	14 August 1319	Margraviate of Brandenburg (at Neumark)	Agnes of Brandenburg-Salzwedel (1297-27 November 1334); 1309 no children	Son of Conrad, co-ruled with his uncles since 1308. Left no descendants, and the margraviate went to his underage cousin.
Waldemar the Great	1280	1318–1319	14 August 1319	Margraviate of Brandenburg	Agnes of Brandenburg-Salzwedel (1297-27 November 1334); 1309 no children	Son of Conrad, co-ruled with his uncles since 1308. Left no descendants, and the margraviate went to his underage cousin.
Regency of Wartislaw IV, Duke of Pomerania (1319–1320)						Son of Henry I. Died as a minor. After the extinction of the Ascanian dynasty in 1320, Brandenburg came under the control of the Emperor Louis IV of the House of Wittelsbach, who granted Brandenburg to his eldest son, Louis V of Bavaria.
Henry II the Child	1302	1319–1320	26 March 1317	Margraviate of Brandenburg	Unmarried	Son of Henry I. Died as a minor. After the extinction of the Ascanian dynasty in 1320, Brandenburg came under the control of the Emperor Louis IV of the House of Wittelsbach, who granted Brandenburg to his eldest son, Louis V of Bavaria.
Sophia	1300	1320–1356	1356	Margraviate of Brandenburg (at Landsberg)	Magnus I, Duke of Brunswick-Lüneburg; 1327 eight children	After her death, the Margraviate of Landsberg was annexed to the Duchy of Brunswick-Lüneburg.

=== House of Wittelsbach ===
Ruler	Born	Reign	Death	Ruling part	Consort	Notes
Louis I the Brandenburger	May 1315	1323–1351	18 September 1361	Margraviate of Brandenburg	Margaret of Denmark; 1324 one child Margaret, Countess of Tyrol; 10 February 1342; Meran four children	In 1351, his brothers Louis and Otto gave up their inheritance in Bavaria, in exchange for the Electoral dignity in Brandenburg.
Louis II the Roman	7 May 1328	1351–1365	17 May 1365	Margraviate of Brandenburg	Cunigunde of Poland before 1349 no children Ingeborg of Mecklenburg-Schwerin; 1360 no children	Elevated in 1356 by the Holy Roman Emperor as First Elector of Brandenburg.
Otto the Lazy	1340/1342	1365–1373	15 November 1379	Electorate of Brandenburg	Catherine of Bohemia; 19 March 1366 no children	Co-ruler of Brandenburg with his brother from 1351, but as a minor (b. 1346) took no part in administration until his brother's death. Abdicated in 1373 but retained the Electoral title. Died 1379.

=== Luxembourg Dynasty ===
Image	Name	Began	Ended	Comments
	Wenceslaus; Wenzel	2 October 1373	29 November 1378	Emperor Charles IV forced the last Wittelsbach Elector to abdicate, and then installed his own son, Wenceslaus. As Wenceslaus was still a minor (b. 1361), the Emperor administered the margraviate for him.
	Sigismund	29 November 1378	1388	Younger brother of Wenceslaus; took control of Brandenburg on his brother's ascension as King of Germany and Bohemia. Gave up Brandenburg to his cousin Jobst as security for a substantial loan.
	Jobst	1388	16 January 1411	Sigismund's first cousin, nephew of Charles IV. Elected as German King in 1410 in opposition to Sigismund, but died very shortly afterwards.
	Sigismund	16 January 1411	30 April 1415	Following Jobst's death, Sigismund regained control of Brandenburg and was elected undisputed King of Germany.

=== House of Hohenzollern ===
==== Partitions of Brandenburg under Hohenzollern rule ====
Electorate of Brandenburg (1415–1440)	Margraviate of Brandenburg (under Luxemburg rule)
Margraviate of Brandenburg (1417–1440)
Electorate of Brandenburg and Margraviate of Brandenburg-Brandenburg (1440–1618)	Margraviate of Brandenburg-Ansbach (1440–1791)	Margraviate of Brandenburg-Kulmbach (1st creation) (1440–1457)
Margraviate of Brandenburg-Kulmbach (2nd creation) (1486–1495)
Margraviate of Brandenburg-Kulmbach (3rd creation) (1515–1557)
Margraviate of Brandenburg-Küstrin (1535–1571)
Margraviate of Brandenburg-Bayreuth (changed seat from Kulmbach to Bayreuth) (1603–1769)
Electorate of Brandenburg, Duchy of Prussia and Margraviate of Brandenburg-Brandenburg (1618–1701)
Margraviate of Brandenburg-Schwedt (1692–1788)
Electorate of Brandenburg and Kingdom of Prussia (1701–1806)
Kingdom of Prussia (1806–1918)

==== Table of rulers ====
(Note: here, the numbering of the princes is the same for all principalities, as all were titled Margraves of Brandenburg, despite the different parts of land and their particular numbering of the rulers. The princes are numbered by the year of their succession.)

Ruler	Born	Reign	Death	Ruling part	Consort	Notes	Ref.
Frederick I Friedrich I	21 September 1371	30 April 1415 – 20 September 1440	20 September 1440	Electorate of Brandenburg	Elisabeth of Bavaria-Landshut; 18 September 1401 ten children	Originally Burgrave of Nuremberg as Frederick VI. Appointed by King Sigismund in 1415 and enfeoffed in 1417.	
Frederick I Friedrich I	21 September 1371	1417–1426	20 September 1440	Margraviate of Brandenburg	Elisabeth of Bavaria-Landshut; 18 September 1401 ten children	In spite of being granted with the Electorate in 1415, the Margraviate was only given to him in 1417, which he abdicated to his son in 1426. In 1420 joined all his ancestors' Nurembergian lands with Brandenburg.	
John the Alchemist	1406	1426–1440	16 November 1464	Margraviate of Brandenburg	Barbara of Saxe-Wittenberg; 1416 four children	Received the Margraviate of Brandenburg from his father. However, after the latter's death, Brandenburg was redivided, and from then on retained Kulmbach. Abdicated 1457.	
John the Alchemist	1406	1440–1457	16 November 1464	Margraviate of Brandenburg-Kulmbach	Barbara of Saxe-Wittenberg; 1416 four children	Received the Margraviate of Brandenburg from his father. However, after the latter's death, Brandenburg was redivided, and from then on retained Kulmbach. Abdicated 1457.	
Frederick II Irontooth; Friedrich II Eisenzahn	19 November 1413	20 September 1440 – 10 February 1471	10 February 1471	Margraviate and Electorate of Brandenburg	Catherine of Saxony; 11 June 1441; Wittenberg three children	Reunited definitely the Margraviate and the Electorate of Brandenburg; however, his father gave to his brothers the lands of Ansbach and Kulmbach.	
Albert I Achilles; Albrecht Achilles	9 November 1414	1440–1486	11 March 1486	Margraviate of Brandenburg-Ansbach	Margaret of Baden; 1446 four children Anna of Saxony; 12 November 1458; Ansbach thirteen children	Received Ansbach after his father's death. In 1457 inherited Kulmbach from his brother John. On the death of his brother in 1471, he became Elector.	
Albert I Achilles; Albrecht Achilles	9 November 1414	1457–1486	11 March 1486	Margraviate of Brandenburg-Kulmbach	Margaret of Baden; 1446 four children Anna of Saxony; 12 November 1458; Ansbach thirteen children	Received Ansbach after his father's death. In 1457 inherited Kulmbach from his brother John. On the death of his brother in 1471, he became Elector.	
Albert I Achilles; Albrecht Achilles	9 November 1414	10 February 1471 – 11 March 1486	11 March 1486	Electorate of Brandenburg	Margaret of Baden; 1446 four children Anna of Saxony; 12 November 1458; Ansbach thirteen children	Received Ansbach after his father's death. In 1457 inherited Kulmbach from his brother John. On the death of his brother in 1471, he became Elector.	
John Cicero; Johann Cicero	2 August 1455	11 March 1486 – 9 January 1499	9 January 1499	Electorate of Brandenburg	Margaret of Thuringia; 15 August 1476; Berlin six children	Eldest son of Albert Achilles.	
Sigismund	27 September 1468	1486–1495	26 February 1495	Margraviate of Brandenburg-Kulmbach	Unmarried	Received Kulmbach after his father's death. Left no descendants, and Kulmbach returned to Ansbach.	
Frederick I the Elder	8 May 1460	1486–1536	4 April 1536	Margraviate of Brandenburg-Ansbach	Sophia of Poland; 14 February 1479; Frankfurt (Oder) seventeen children	Received Ansbach after his father's death. In 1495 inherited the land of his brother. In 1515, the lands were separated again.	
Frederick I the Elder	8 May 1460	1495–1515	4 April 1536	Margraviate of Brandenburg-Kulmbach	Sophia of Poland; 14 February 1479; Frankfurt (Oder) seventeen children	Received Ansbach after his father's death. In 1495 inherited the land of his brother. In 1515, the lands were separated again.	
Joachim I Nestor	21 February 1484	9 January 1499 – 11 July 1535	11 July 1535	Electorate of Brandenburg	Elizabeth of Denmark; 10 April 1502; Berlin five children		
Casimir	27 December 1481	1515–1527	21 September 1527	Margraviate of Brandenburg-Kulmbach	Susanna of Bavaria; 25 August 1518; Augsburg five children	Eldest son of Frederick III, received Kulmbach in his father's lifetime.	
Regency of George, Margrave of Brandenburg-Ansbach (1527–1541)						Left no descendants, and Kulmbach returned to Ansbach.	
Albert II Alcibiades the Warlike	28 March 1522	1527–1557	8 January 1557	Margraviate of Brandenburg-Kulmbach	Unmarried	Left no descendants, and Kulmbach returned to Ansbach.	
Joachim II Hector	13 January 1505	11 July 1535 – 3 January 1571	3 January 1571	Electorate of Brandenburg	Magdalena of Saxony; 6 November 1524; Dresden six children Hedwig of Poland; 29 August/1 September 1535; Kraków six children	First Protestant Elector of Brandenburg.	
John	3 August 1513	1535–1571	13 January 1571	Margraviate of Brandenburg-Küstrin	Catherine of Brunswick-Wolfenbüttel; 11 November 1537; Wolfenbüttel two children	Son of Elector Joachim I. The Margraviate of Küstrin was created for him. After his death without male descendants, Küstrin was annexed again to the Electorate.	
George I the Pious	4 March 1484	1536–1543	27 December 1543	Margraviate of Brandenburg-Ansbach	Beatrice de Frangepan; 21 January 1509; Gyula no children Hedwig of Münsterberg-Oels; 9 January 1525; Oleśnica two children Emilie of Saxony; 25 August 1533 four children		
Regencies of Joachim II Hector, Elector of Brandenburg and Philip I, Landgrave of Hesse (1543–1548), John Frederick I, Elector of Saxony (1543–1547) and Maurice, Elector of Saxony (1547–1548)						In 1557, reunited Kulmbach with Ansbach once more. Left no descendants, and the Margraviates passed to the sons of the Elector John George.	
George Frederick I the Elder	5 April 1539	1543–1603	25 April 1603	Margraviate of Brandenburg-Ansbach	Elisabeth of Brandenburg-Küstrin; 26 December 1558; Küstrin no children Sophie of Brunswick-Lüneburg; 3 May 1579; Dresden no children	In 1557, reunited Kulmbach with Ansbach once more. Left no descendants, and the Margraviates passed to the sons of the Elector John George.	
George Frederick I the Elder	5 April 1539	1557–1603	25 April 1603	Margraviate of Brandenburg-Kulmbach	Elisabeth of Brandenburg-Küstrin; 26 December 1558; Küstrin no children Sophie of Brunswick-Lüneburg; 3 May 1579; Dresden no children	In 1557, reunited Kulmbach with Ansbach once more. Left no descendants, and the Margraviates passed to the sons of the Elector John George.	
John George; Johann Georg	11 September 1525	3 January 1571 – 8 January 1598	8 January 1598	Electorate of Brandenburg	Sophie of Legnica; 15 February 1545 one child Sabina of Brandenburg-Ansbach; 12 February 1548; Ansbach eleven children Elisabeth of Anhalt-Zerbst; 6 October 1577; Letzlingen eleven children		
Joachim Frederick; Joachim Friedrich	27 January 1546	8 January 1598 – 18 July 1608	18 July 1608	Electorate of Brandenburg	Catherine of Brandenburg-Küstrin; 8 January 1570; Küstrin eleven children Eleanor of Prussia; 2 November 1603; Berlin one child		
Joachim Ernest	22 June 1583	1603–1625	7 March 1625	Margraviate of Brandenburg-Ansbach	Sophie of Solms-Laubach; 1612; Ansbach three children	Son of Elector John George. Received Ansbach	
Christian	30 January 1581	1603–1655	30 May 1655	Margraviate of Brandenburg-Bayreuth	Maria of Prussia; 29 April 1604; Kulmbach nine children	Son of Elector John George. Received Kulmbach. In 1604, the capital of the Margraviate was moved to Bayreuth. From 1604 on, Brandenburg-Kulmbach changed its name to Brandenburg-Bayreuth.	
John Sigismund; Johann Sigismund	8 November 1572	18 July 1608 – 3 November 1619	23 December 1619	Electorate of Brandenburg	Anna of Prussia; 30 October 1594; Königsberg eight children	Duke of Prussia from 1618.	
George William I Georg Wilhelm	13 November 1595	3 November 1619 – 1 December 1640	1 December 1640	Electorate of Brandenburg	Elizabeth Charlotte of the Palatinate; 24 July 1616; Heidelberg four children	His reign was marked by ineffective governance during the Thirty Years' War. Also, the Duke of Prussia.	
Frederick III	1 May 1616	1625–1634	6 September 1634	Margraviate of Brandenburg-Ansbach	Unmarried	Left no descendants. He was succeeded by his brother.	
Albert II	18 September 1620	1634–1667	22 October 1667	Margraviate of Brandenburg-Ansbach	Henriette Louise of Württemberg-Mömpelgard; 31 August 1642; Stuttgart three children Sophie Margarete of Oettingen-Oettingen; 15 October 1651; Oettingen five children Christine of Baden-Durlach; 6 August 1665; Durlach no children		
Frederick William I the Great Elector; Friedrich Wilhelm	16 February 1620	1 December 1640 – 29 April 1688	29 April 1688	Electorate of Brandenburg	Louise Henriette of Nassau; 7 December 1646; The Hague six children Sophia Dorothea of Schleswig-Holstein-Sonderburg-Glücksburg; 13 July 1668; Gröningen seven children	Also Duke of Prussia.	
Christian Ernest	6 August 1644	1655–1712	20 May 1712	Margraviate of Brandenburg-Bayreuth	Erdmuthe Sophie of Saxony; 29 October 1662; Dresden no children Sophie Luise of Württemberg; 8 February 1671; Stuttgart six children Elisabeth Sophie of Brandenburg; 30 March 1703; Potsdam nine children	Son of Erdmann August, son of Christian I.	
John Frederick	18 October 1654	1667–1686	22 March 1686	Margraviate of Brandenburg-Ansbach	Johanna Elisabeth of Baden-Durlach; 26 January 1673; Durlach five children Eleonore Erdmuthe of Saxe-Eisenach; 4 November 1681; Eisenach three children		
Council of Regency (1686–1692)						Died as a minor; he was succeeded by his brother.	
Christian Albert	18 September 1675	1686–1692	16 October 1692)	Margraviate of Brandenburg-Ansbach	Unmarried	Died as a minor; he was succeeded by his brother.	
Frederick III; Friedrich I	11 July 1657	29 April 1688 – 25 February 1713	25 February 1713	Electorate of Brandenburg	Elisabeth Henriette of Hesse-Kassel; 13 August 1679; Potsdam one child Sophia Charlotte of Hanover; 8 October 1684; Herrenhausen two children Sophia Louise of Mecklenburg-Schwerin; 28 November 1708; Berlin no children	Also Duke of Prussia. In 1701 became the first King in Prussia, as Frederick I.	
Electorate and Margraviate of Brandenburg annexed to Prussia							
George Frederick II	3 May 1678	1692–1703	29 March 1703	Margraviate of Brandenburg-Ansbach	Unmarried	Died without descendants; he was succeeded by his brother.	
Philip William	19 May 1669	1692–1711	19 December 1711	Margraviate of Brandenburg-Schwedt	Johanna Charlotte of Anhalt-Dessau; 25 January 1699; Oranienbaum six children	Son of Elector Frederick William I. The Margraviate of Schwedt was created for him.	
William Frederick	8 January 1686	1703–1723	7 January 1723	Margraviate of Brandenburg-Ansbach	Christiane Charlotte of Württemberg-Winnental; 28 August 1709; Stuttgart three children		
Frederick William	17 November 1700	1711–1771	4 March 1771	Margraviate of Brandenburg-Schwedt	Sophia Dorothea of Prussia; 10 November 1734; Potsdam five children	Left no male descendants. The title passed to his brother, Frederick Henry.	
George William	26 November 1678	1712–1726	18 December 1726	Margraviate of Brandenburg-Bayreuth	Sophie of Saxe-Weissenfels; 16 October 1699; Leipzig five children		
Regency of Christiane Charlotte of Württemberg-Winnental (1723–1729)							
Charles William Frederick the Wild Margrave	12 May 1712	1723–1757	3 August 1757	Margraviate of Brandenburg-Ansbach	Friederike Luise of Prussia; 30 May 1729; Berlin two children		
George Frederick Charles	30 June 1688	1726–1735	17 May 1735	Margraviate of Brandenburg-Bayreuth	Princess Dorothea of Schleswig-Holstein-Sonderburg-Beck; 17 April 1709; Reinfeld five children		
Frederick	10 May 1711	1735–1763	26 February 1763	Margraviate of Brandenburg-Bayreuth	Wilhelmine of Prussia; 17 April 1709; Berlin one child Sophie Caroline of Brunswick-Wolfenbüttel; 20 September 1759; Brunswick no children	Left no male descendants; the title passed to Frederick Christian, from a collateral Bayreuth line.	
Frederick Christian	17 July 1708	1763–1769	20 January 1769	Margraviate of Brandenburg-Bayreuth	Victoria Charlotte of Anhalt-Zeitz-Hoym; 26 April 1732; Schaumburg two children	Great-grandson of Christian I and cousin of his predecessors. Left no male descendants; Bayreuth was reunited to Ansbach.	
Bayreuth definitively annexed to Ansbach							
Charles Alexander	24 February 1736	1757–1791	5 January 1806	Margraviate of Brandenburg-Ansbach	Frederica Caroline of Saxe-Coburg-Saalfeld; 22 November 1754; Coburg no children Elizabeth Craven; 13/30 October 1791; Lisbon morganatic no children	In 1769 reunited both Margraviates of Ansbach and Bayreuth.In 1791 sold both Margraviates to the Kingdom of Prussia.	
Frederick Henry	21 August 1709	1771–1788	12 December 1788	Margraviate of Brandenburg-Schwedt	Leopoldine Marie of Anhalt-Dessau; 13 February 1739 two children	Left no male descendants. Schwedt went back to the Electorate.	
Schwedt definitively annexed to Prussia							

== Titular Margraves of Brandenburg after 1806 ==
This includes the Kings of Prussia with the title of Margrave of Brandenburg (1806–1918) and pretenders to the throne of Prussia (1918–present)

Margrave	Portrait	Lifespan	Reign start	Reign end
Frederick William V Friedrich Wilhelm III		3 August 1770 – 7 June 1840	6 August 1806	7 June 1840
Frederick William VI; Friedrich Wilhelm IV		15 October 1795 – 2 January 1861	7 June 1840	2 January 1861
William I Wilhelm I		22 March 1797 – 9 March 1888	2 January 1861	9 March 1888
Frederick VIII; Friedrich III		18 October 1831 – 15 June 1888	9 March 1888	15 June 1888
William II; Wilhelm II		27 January 1859 – 4 June 1941	15 June 1888	Prussian monarchy abolished on 28 November 1918; 4 June 1941
William III; Wilhelm III		6 May 1882 – 20 July 1951	4 June 1941	20 July 1951
Louis Ferdinand; Ludwig Ferdinand I		9 November 1907 – 26 September 1994	20 July 1951	26 September 1994
George Frederick III; Georg Friedrich I		10 June 1976 – present	26 September 1994	Incumbent

== Family tree ==
The colours denote the Margraves and Electors of various partitions of Brandenburg:

– Margraves and Electors of Brandenburg

– Margraves of Brandenburg-Kulmbach

– Margraves of Brandenburg-Stendal

– Margraves of Brandenburg-Ansbach

– Margraves of Brandenburg-Salzwedel

– Margraves of Brandenburg-Bayreuth

– Margraves of Brandenburg-Küstrin

– Margraves of Brandenburg-Schwedt

Casimir I of Poland; 1016–1058
ASCANIAN
Świętosława of Poland c. 1047–1126	Władysław I Herman of Poland c. 1044–1102	Otto of Ballenstedt c. 1070–1123	Eilika of Saxony c. 1080–1142
Vladislav I of Bohemia c. 1065–1125	Bołesław III of Poland; 1086–1138	Salomea of Berg c. 1100–1144	Albert I the Bear c. 1100 – 1157–1170	Sophie of Winzenburg; 1105–1160	Pribislav- Henry of the Hevelli died 1150
Richeza of Poland; 116–1156	Vladislav II of Bohemia c. 1110–1174	Soběslav I of Bohemia c. 1075–1140	Mieszko III the Old of Poland; 1126–1202	Judith of Poland c. 1332–1171	Otto I c. 1128–br>1170–1184	Ada of Holland c. 1163–1205	A Wendish princess, identity unknown	Bernhard of Anhalt c. 1134–1212
Frederick I of Bohemia; 1142–1189	Sophia of Minsk c. 1140–1198	Přemysl I Ottokar of Bohemia c. 1155–1230	Soběslav II of Bohemia c. 1128–1180	Elisabeth of Poland c. 1152–1209	Conrad II of Lusatia; 1159–1210	Otto II the Generous; 1147–1184–1205	Albert I of Saxony c. 1175–1260	Odon of Poznań c. 1149–1194
Ludmilla of Bohemia died 1240	Valdemar II of Denmark; 1170–1244	Vaclav I of Bohemia c. 1205–1253	Cunigunde of Swabia; 1202–1248	Matilda of Lusatia; 1185–1225	Albert II c. 1177– 1205–1220	Władysław of Greater; Poland c. 1190–1239
WITTELSBACH
Přemysl; Ottokar II of Bohemia; 1233–1278	Otto II/IV of Bavaria; 1206–1253	Christopher I of Denmark; 1219–1259	Beatrice of Bohemia; 1225–1290	Otto III the Pious; 1215–1220–1267	Rudolf I of Germany; 1218–1291	Sophie of Denmark; 1217–1247	John I c. 1213– 1220–1266	Brigitte; Judith of Saxony died 1266	Przemysł I of Greater; Poland; 1220–1257	Matilda of Brandenburg c. 1210–1261
Albert III c. 1250– 1267–1300	Matilda of Denmark; 1250–1299	Otto V the Tall; 1246–1267–1298	Judith of Henneberg- Coburg	Otto VI the Short; 1255–1267– 1286–1303	Hedwig of Habsburg c. 1260–1303	Albert I of Germany; 1255–1308	Otto IV of the Arrow; 1238–1266–1308	John II; 1237–1266–1281	Conrad c. 1240– 1266–1304	Constance of Greater; Poland; 1246–1281
Vaclav II of Bohemia; 1271–1305	Louis II of Bavaria; 1229–1294	John III of Prague; 1244–1267–1268	Beatrice of Brandenburg c. 1270 – 1316	Bolko I of Jawor and Świdnica; 1252/6–1301	Herman the Tall; 1275–1299–1308	Anne of Austria; 1275–1327	Albert II of Austria; 1298–1358	Adelaide of Brunswick- Lüneburg; 1244–1274
LUXEMBOURG
Elizabeth of Bohemia; 1292–1330	John the Blind of Bohemia; 1296–1346	Bernard II of Jawor and Świdnica c. 1291 – 1326	Margaret II of Hainault; 1311–1356	Louis IV, Holy Roman; Emperor	Beatrice of Silesia; 1290–1320	Nicholas I of Troppau c. 1255 – 1318	John V the Illustrious; 1302–1308–1317	Agnes of Brandenburg- Salzwedel; 1296–1334	Waldemar the Great; 1280–1317–1319; Stendal; 1308–1317	Henry I Lackland; 1256–1317–1318; Stendal; 1266–1317	Agnes of Bavaria; 1276–1345	Adelaide of Hesse; 1268–1317
WETTIN
Otto V the Lazy; 1346–1351–1379	Henry II of Świdnica; 1316–1345	Louis II the Roman; 1328–1351–1365	Stephen II of Bavaria; 1319–1375	Louis I 1315–1323– 1351–1361	Nicholas II of Troppau; 1288–1365	Matilda of Bavaria; 1313–1346	Frederick II of Meissen; 1310–1349	Elisabeth of Henneberg- Schleusingen; 1318–1377	Henry II the Child; 1308–1319–1320	Frederick I of Celje c. 1300 – 1359
HOHENZOLLERN
Anna of Świdnica; 1339–1362	Charles IV, Holy Roman; Emperor; 1316–1378	Elizabeth of Pomerania c. 1347 – 1393	Albert III of Austria; 1349–1395	Frederick of Bavaria; 1339–1393	John Henry of Moravia; 1322–1375	Margaret of Opava; 1330–1363	Frederick III of Thuringia; 1332–1381	Elisabeth of Meissen; 1329–1375	Frederick V of Nuremberg; 1333–1398	False Waldemar r. 1348–1350, died 1356	Hermann I of Celje; 1333–1385
Wenzel the Idle; 1361–1373 – 1378–1419	Herman II of Celje c. 1360 – 1435	Albert IV of Austria; 1377–1404	Jobst; 1354–1397–1411	Frederick I of Saxony; 1370–1428	Elisabeth of Bavaria; 1383–1442	Frederick I 1371–1415–1440	Elisabeth of Nuremberg; 1358–1411	Ulrich I of Celje; 1331–1368	Margaret of Hohenzollern- Neuburg; 1367–1406
HESSE
Leopold III of Austria; 1351–1386	Sigismund I 1368–1378 – 1388–1411 – 1415–1437	Barbara of Cilli; 1392–1451	Catherine of Saxony; 1421–1476	Frederick II; Irontooth; 1413–1440–1471	John VI the Alchemist; 1406–1440–1457; Brandenburg; 1426–1440	Margaret of the Palatinate; 1376–1434	William of Celje; 1361–1392	Anna of Saxony; 1420–1462	Louis I of Hesse; 1402–1458
Ernest the Iron of Austria; 1377–1424	Cymburgis of Masovia; 1394–1429	Elisabeth of Luxembourg; 1409–1442	Albert V of Austria; 1397–1439	Sophia of Halshany; 1405–1461	Władysław II; Jagiełło of Poland c. 1352 – 1434	Anna of Cilli c. 1381 – 1416	Albert III of Bavaria; 1401–1460	Frederick II of Saxony; 1412–1464	Catherine of Lorraine; 1431–1457	William III of Meissen- Thuringia; 1425–1482
Frederick III, Holy Roman; Emperor; 1415–1493	Eleanor of Portugal; 1434–1467	Elizabeth of Austria; 1436–1505	Casimir IV; Andrew of Poland; 1427–1472	Frederick; Magnus I of Solms-Laubach; 1521–1561	Agnes of Wied	Anna of Saxony; 1437–1512	Albert IV; Achilles; 1414–1471–1486; Ansbach; 1440–1486; Kulmbach; 1457–1486	Margaret of Baden; 1431–1457	Ernest of Saxony; 1441–1486	Elisabeth of Bavaria; 1443–1484	Louis II of Lower Hesse; 1438–1471
Albert III of Saxony; 1443–1500	Cunigunde of Austria; 1465–1520	Albert IV of Bavaria- Munich; 1447–1508	Sophie of Poland; 1464–1512	Frederick II the Elder; 1450–1486–1535; Kulmbach; 1495–1515	Sigismund II; 1468–1486–1495	Ursula of Brandenburg; 1488–1510	John VII; Cicero; 1455–1486–1499	Margaret of Saxony- Thuringia; 1449–1501	Christina of Saxony; 1461–1521	John of Saxony; 1468–1532	William II of Hesse; 1469–1509
Henry IV of Saxony; 1473–1541	George the Bearded of Saxony; 1471–1539	Susanna of Bavaria; 1502–1543	Casimir; 1481–1515–1527	Albert of Prussia; 1490–1568	Charles I of Münsterburg- Oels; 1476–1536	Sophie of Brandenburg- Ansbach- Kulmbach; 1485–1537	Joachim I Nestor; 1484–1499–1535	Elizabeth of Denmark; 1485–1555	John Frederick; 1503–1554 regent 1543–1547	Anna of Brandenburg; 1487–1514
Maurice; 1521–1571 regent 1547–1548	Christine of Saxony; 1505–1549	Philip; 1504–1567 regent 1543–1548	Albert V Alcibiades; 1522–1527 – 1553–1557	Emilie of Saxony; 1516–1591	George I the Pious; 1484–1536–1543; Kulmbach, regent 1527–1541	Hedwig of Münsterberg- Oels; 1508–1531	Magdalena of Saxony; 1507–1534	Joachim II; Hector; 1505–1535–1571; Ansbach, regent 1543–1548	Catherine of Brunswick- Wolfenbüttel; 1518–1574	John VIII; 1513–1535–1571	Hedwig; Jagiellon; 1513–1573
Elisabeth of Solms- Laubach	John George I of Solms- Laubach; 1547–1600	Margaret of Schönburg- Glauchau	Elisabeth of Anhalt- Zerbst; 1563–1607	Elisabeth of Brandenburg- Küstrin; 1540–1578	George; Frederick the Elder; 1539–1547–1603; Kulmbach; 1557–1603	Sabina of Brandenburg- Ansbach; 1529–1575	John George; 1525–1571–1598	Sophie of Legnica; 1525–1546	Albert; Frederick of Prussia; 1553–1618	Marie of Brandenburg- Kulmbach; 1519–1567	Hedwig of Brandenburg; 1540–1602	Christian III of Denmark; 1503–1559
Agnes of Sayn- Wittgenstein	Henry William I of Solms- Sonnerwalde	Sophie of Solms- Laubach; 1594–1651	Joachim Ernst; 1583–1603–1625	Christian; 1581–1603–1655	Marie of Prussia; 1579–1649	Barbara of Hesse; 1536–1597	Eleanor of Prussia; 1583–1607	Joachim; Frederick; 1546–1598–1608	Catherine of Brandenburg- Küstrin; 1549–1602	Louis VI of the Palatinate; 1539–1583	Maria of Brunswick- Lüneburg; 1566–1626	John II of Schleswig- Holstein- Sonderburg; 1545–1622	Anna Sophia of Prussia; 1527–1591
Amaila of Solms- Braunfels; 1602–1675	Anna Sybilla of Solms- Sonnenwalde	Frederick IV; 1616–1625–1634	Sophie of Brandenburg- Ansbach; 1614–1646	Erdmann; August of Brandenburg- Bayreuth; 1615–1651	Frederick IV of the Palatinate; 1574–1610	Georg Albrecht of Brandenburg- Bayreuth- Kulmbach; 1619–1666	Anna of Prussia; 1576–1625	John Sigismund; 1572–1608–1619	Frederick I of Württemberg; 1557–1608	Magdalene of Brandenburg; 1582–1616
Sophie; Margarete of Oettingen- Oettingen	Albert VI; 1620–1634–1667	Barbara of Württemburg; 1593–1627	Christian; Ernst; 1644–1655–1712	Sophie; Louise of Württemburg; 1642–1702	Christian; Henry of Brandenburg- Bayreuth- Kulmbach; 1661–1708	George; William I 1595–1619–1640	Elizabeth; Charlotte of the Palatinate; 1597–1660	Anne Eleonore of Hesse- Darmstadt; 1601–1659	Sophie; Hedwig of Saxe- Lauenburg; 1601–1660	Philip of Schleswig- Holstein- Sonderburg- Glücksburg; 1584–1663	John VII of Mecklenburg; 1558–1592
Frederick VI of Baden- Durlach; 1617–1677	George; William II; 1678–1712–1726	Dorothea of Schleswig- Holstein- Sonderburg- Glücksburg; 1636–1689	George; Frederick; Charles; 1688–1726–1735	Henriette; Catherina of Nassau; 1637–1708	Louise; Henriette of Nassau; 1627–1667	Frederick; William I the Great; 1620–1640–1688	Dorothea of Schleswig- Holstein- Sonderburg-Beck; 1685–1761	Ernest; Augustus of Hanover; 1629–1698	John; Albert II of Mecklenburg; 1590–1636
Eleonore; Juliane of Brandenburg- Ansbach; 1663–1724	Eleonore; Erdmuthe of Saxe-Eisenach; 1662–1696	John Frederick; 1654–1667–1686	Joanna; Elisabeth of Baden- Durlach; 1651–1680	Frederick; Christian; 1708–1763–1769	Frederick VI; 1711–1735–1763	Johanna; Charlotte of Anhalt-Dessau; 1682–1750	Philip William; 1669–1692–1711	Frederick V 1657–1688–1713	Sophia; Charlotte of Hanover; 1668–1705	Sophia; Dorothea of Brunswick- Lüneburg-Celle; 1666–1726	Elisabeth; Sophie of Mecklenburg; 1613–1676
Christine; Charlotte regent 1694–1723–1729	William; Frederick; 1686–1703–1723	George; Frederick II; 1678–1692–1703	Ferdinand; Albert I of Brunswick- Wolfenbüttel- Bevern; 1636–1687	Frederick; William II; 1700–1711–1771	Frederick; Henry; 1709–1771–1788	Frederick; William III the Soldier; 1688–1713–1740	Sophia; Dorothea of Hanover; 1687–1757
Charles; William; Frederick the Wild; 1712–1729–1757	Frederica; Louisa of Prussia; 1714–1784	Philippine; Charlotte of Prussia; 1716–1801	Charles I of Brunswick- Wolfenbüttel; 1713–1780	Luise of Brunswick- Wolfenbüttel; 1722–1790	Augustus; William of Prussia; 1722–1758	Schwedt annexed by the Electorate	Elisabeth; Christine of Brunswick- Wolfenbüttel; 1715–1797	Frederick VII the Great; 1712–1740–1786
Alexander; 1736–1757 – 1791–1806; Bayreuth; 1769–1791	Elisabeth; Christine of Brunswick- Wolfenbüttel; 1746–1840	Frederick; William IV; 1744–1786–1797	Frederica; Louisa of Hesse-Darmstadt; 1751–1805
Ansbach and Bayreuth sold to Prussia	Frederick; William V 1770–1797 – 1806–1840
Brandenburg definitively annexed by Prussia

== See also ==
- List of consorts of Brandenburg
- Lists of political office-holders in Brandenburg
  - List of minister-presidents of Brandenburg
- List of monarchs of Prussia
