= List of consorts of Brandenburg =

List of consorts of Brandenburg contains all consorts of the Central European land of Brandenburg, in its various incarnations, from the conquest of the region from the Wends until the incoporation of the royal title of "Brandenburg" into the Kingdom of Prussia.

== Margravine of the Nordmark, 965–1157 ==
House of Haldensleben
Picture	Name	Father	Birth	Marriage	Became Margravine	Ceased to be Margravine	Death	Spouse
The name of Dietrich's wife and the mother of his children is not known.								Dietrich
House of Walbeck
	Godila of Rothenburg	Werner, Count of Rothenburg	-	-	983 husband's accession	25 January 1003 husband's death	1015	Lothair
	Liutgard of Meissen	Eckard I, Margrave of Meissen (Ekkehardiner)	-	January 1003	25 January 1003 husband's accession	1009 husband's deprived of title	13 November 1012	Werner
House of Haldensleben
	? Vladimirovna	Vladimir I of Kiev (Rurikids)	-	991/92	1009 husband's accession	1051 husband's death	-	Bernard
House of Udonen
	Adelaide of Rheinfelden	-	-	1025	1056 husband's accession	7 November 1057 husband's death	7 December after 1057	Lothair Udo I
	Oda of Werl	Herman III, Count of Werl (Werl)	ca. 1050	1065		4 May 1082 husband's death	13 January 1110	Lothair Udo II
	Eupraxia of Kiev	Vsevolod I of Kiev (Rurikids)	1071	-		27 June 1087 husband's death	20 July 1109	Henry I
	Irmgard of Plötzkau	Dietrich, Count of Plötzkau (Plötzkau)	1085/87	1095/1100		2 June 1106 husband's death	26 November 1154	Lothair Udo III
	Richgard of Sponheim	Hermann of Sponheim, Burgrave of Magdeburg (Sponheim)	-	-	2 June 1106 husband's death	1114 husband's desposition	1151	Rudolph I
House of Plötzkau
	Adela of Beichlingen	Kuno of Northeim, Count of Beichlingen (Northeim)	-	after August 1106	1112 husband's accession	1118 husband's death	1123	Helferich
House of Udonen
	Adelaide of Ballenstedt	Otto, Count of Ballenstedt (Ascania)	1100	-	1114 husband's accession	4 December 1128 husband's death	1139	Henry II
	Matilda of Winzenburg	Hermann I, Count of Winzenburg	-	1124 after 7 December	4 December 1128 husband's accession	15 February 1130 husband's death	23 May 1155	Lothair Udo IV
	Elisabeth of Styria	Leopold I, Margrave of Styria (Otakars)	1124	before 1128	15 February 1130 husband's accession	25 December after 1138		Rudolph II
House of Plötzkau
	unnamed	Bolesław III Wrymouth (Piast)	before 1119	1131		10 January 1133 husband's death	-	Conrad

== Margravine of Brandenburg, 1157–1356 ==
House of Ascania
Picture	Name	Father	Birth	Marriage	Became Margravine	Ceased to be Margravine	Death	Spouse
	Sophie of Winzenburg	Herman I, Count of Winzenburg	-	1124, after 7 December	3 October 1157 husband's accession	25 March 1160		Albert I
	Judith of Poland	Bolesław III Wrymouth (Piast)	1130/5	6 January 1148	18 November 1170 husband's accession	8 July 1171/5		Otto I
	Ada of Holland	Floris III, Count of Holland (Holland)	1163/6	after 1171/5		8 July 1184 husband's death	after 1205	Otto I
	Mathilde of Landsberg	Conrad II, Margrave of Lusatia (Wettin)	-	August 1205		25 February 1220 husband's death	1255	Albert II
	Sophie of Denmark	Valdemar II of Denmark (Estridsen)	1217	1233/35		2 November 1247		John I
	Brigitte of Saxony	Albert I, Duke of Saxony (Ascania)	-	7 May 1255		3 June 1266 or 2 February 1267 husband's death	before 23 December 1287	John I
	Beatrice of Bohemia	Wenceslaus I of Bohemia (Přemyslids)	1230/31	before June 1243		9 October 1267 husband's death	27 May 1290	Otto III
From 1266 to 1319, Brandenburg was held by the two lines of Brandenburg-Stendal and Brandenburg-Salzwedel, all of whom jointly shared the title of Margravine.
Margravine of Brandenburg-Stendal; House of Ascania
	Hedwig of Werle	Nicholas I, Lord of Werle (Mecklenburg-Werle)	1243	1258/62	3 June 1266 or 2 February 1267 husband's accession	10 September 1281 husband's death	9 September 1287	John II
	Heilwig of Holstein-Kiel	John I, Count of Holstein-Kiel (Schauenburg)	1250	29 January 1262	3 June 1266 or 2 February 1267 husband's accession	3 January 1305/1307		Otto IV
	Jutta of Henneberg	Herman I, Count of Henneberg-Coburg (Henneberg)	1272	1308		27 November 1308 husband's death	25 April 1317	Otto IV
	Constance of Greater Poland	Przemysł I of Greater Poland (Piast)	1245/46	1260	3 June 1266 or 2 February 1267 husband's accession	8 October 1281		Conrad
	Agnes of Bavaria	Louis II, Duke of Bavaria (Wittelsbach)	1276/78	November 1298 or 19 May 1303		14 February 1318 husband's death	1340 or 22 July 1345	Henry I
	Agnes of Brandenburg	Herman, Margrave of Brandenburg (Ascania)	1296/98	May or October 1309	314 February 1318 husband's accession	14 August 1319 husband's death	28 November 1334	Waldemar
Margravine of Brandenburg-Salzwedel; House of Ascania
	Jutta of Henneberg	Herman I, Count of Henneberg-Coburg (Henneberg)	-	22 October 1268		before 13 September 1295		Otto V
	Matilda of Denmark	Christopher I of Denmark (Estridsen)	-	1269 or 1271		23 April 1299/19 November 1300 or 1311		Albert III
	Hedwig of Habsburg	Rudolph I of Germany (Habsburg)	1258–1261	1279		26 January 1285/27 October 1286		Otto VI
	Anna of Austria	Albert I of Germany (Habsburg)	1275/80	1279	23/24 August 1298 husband's accession	1 January 1308 husband's death	19 March 1327	Herman
	Katharina of Glogau	Henry III, Duke of Silesia-Glogau (Piast)	1300/05	before 24 March 1317		24 March 1317 husband's death	5 December 1323/26	John V
After the extinction of the Ascanian dynasty in 1320, Brandenburg came under the control of the Emperor Louis IV of the House of Wittelsbach, who granted Brandenburg to his eldest son, Louis V of Bavaria.
House of Wittelsbach
	Margaret of Denmark	Christopher II of Denmark (Estridsen)	1305	December 1324		19 March/31 May 1340		Louis I
	Margarete Maultasch	Henry of Bohemia (Meinhardiner)	1318	10 February 1342		December 1351 husband's abdication	3 October 1369	Louis I
	Cunigunde of Poland	Casimir III of Poland (Piast)	before 16 May 1335	1 January/25 July 1352		10 January 1356 raised to Electoral status	26 April 1357	Louis II
With the Golden Bull of 1356 the Margraviate was raised to an Electorate.

== Electress of Brandenburg, 1356–1806 ==
House of Wittelsbach
Picture	Name	Father	Birth	Marriage	Became Electress	Ceased to be Electress	Death	Spouse
	Cunigunde of Poland	Casimir III of Poland (Piast)	before 16 May 1335	1 January/25 July 1352	10 January 1356 raised to Electoral status	26 April 1357		Louis II
	Ingeborg of Mecklenburg-Schwerin	Albert II, Duke of Mecklenburg (Mecklenburg-Schwerin)	1340	15 February 1360		17 May 1365 husband's death	25 July 1395	Louis II
	Katharine of Bohemia	Charles IV, Holy Roman Emperor (Luxembourg)	19 August 1342	19 March 1366		18 August 1373 husband's abdication, kept electoral dignity till death	26 April 1395	Otto VII
Emperor Charles IV invaded Brandenburg in 1371 since Otto neglected his government. Two years later Otto officially resigned against a huge financial compensation and retired in Bavaria. This was the end of the Wittelsbach rule in Brandenburg.
House of Luxembourg
Picture	Name	Father	Birth	Marriage	Became Electress	Ceased to be Electress	Death	Spouse
	Joanna of Bavaria	Albert I, Duke of Bavaria (Wittelsbach)	1362	29 September 1370	2 October 1373 husband's accession	29 November 1378 husband relinquished title	31 December 1386	Wenceslaus I
	Mary of Hungary	Louis I of Hungary (Anjou-Hungary)	1371	31 March 1378		1388; Brandenburg mortgaged	17 May 1395	Sigismund
	Agnes of Opole	Bolko II of Opole (Piast)	-	1374	1388 husband's accession	18 January 1411 husband's death	1 April 1413	Jobst
	Barbara of Celje	Herman II, Count of Celje (Celje)	1390/1395	1408	16 January 1411 husband's accession	30 April 1415 husband ceased to be elector	11 July 1451	Sigismund
House of Hohenzollern
Picture	Name	Father	Birth	Marriage	Became Electress	Ceased to be Electress	Death	Spouse
	Elisabeth of Bavaria	Frederick, Duke of Bavaria (Wittelsbach)	1383	18 September 1401	30 April 1415 husband's accession	20 September 1440 husband's death	13 November 1442	Frederick I
	Catherine of Saxony	Frederick I, Elector of Saxony (Wettin)	1421	11 June 1441		1470 husband's abdication	23 August 1476	Frederick II
	Anna of Saxony	Frederick II, Elector of Saxony (Wettin)	7 March 1437	12 November 1458	1471 husband's accession	11 March 1486 husband's death	31 October 1512	Albrecht III Achilles
	Margaret of Thuringia	William III of Saxony, Duke of Luxemburg (Wettin)	1449	25 August 1476	11 March 1486 husband's accession	9 January 1499 husband's death	13 July 1501	John Cicero
	Elizabeth of Denmark	John of Denmark (Oldenburg)	24 June 1485	10 April 1502		11 July 1535 husband's death	10 June 1555	Joachim I Nestor
	Hedwig of Poland	Sigismund I the Old (Jagiellon)	15 March 1513	29 August/1 September 1535		3 January 1571 husband's abdication	7 February 1573	Joachim II Hector
	Sabina of Brandenburg-Ansbach	George, Margrave of Brandenburg-Ansbach (Hohenzollern)	12 May 1529	12 February 1548	3 January 1571 husband's accession	2 November 1575		John George
	Elisabeth of Anhalt-Zerbst	George, Margrave of Brandenburg-Ansbach (Hohenzollern)	5/15 September 1563	6 October 1577		8 January 1598 husband's death	8 October 1607	John George
	Catherine of Brandenburg-Küstrin	John, Margrave of Brandenburg-Küstrin (Hohenzollern)	10 August 1549	8 January 1570	8 January 1598 husband's accession	30 September 1602		Joachim Frederick
	Eleanor of Prussia	Albert Frederick, Duke of Prussia (Hohenzollern)	21 August 1583	23 October 1603		9 April 1607		Joachim Frederick
	Anna of Prussia	Albert Frederick, Duke of Prussia (Hohenzollern)	3 July 1576	30 October 1594	18 July 1608 husband's accession	23 December 1619 husband's death	30 August 1625	John Sigismund
	Elizabeth Charlotte of the Palatinate	Frederick IV, Elector Palatine (Palatinate-Simmern)	19 November 1597	24 July 1616	23 December 1619 husband's accession	1 December 1640 husband's death	26 April 1660	George William
	Louise Henriette of Orange-Nassau	Frederick Henry, Prince of Orange (Orange-Nassau)	7 December 1627	7 December 1646		18 June 1667		Frederick William I
	Sophia Dorothea of Schleswig-Holstein-Sonderburg-Glücksburg	Philip, Duke of Schleswig-Holstein-Sonderburg-Glücksburg (Schleswig-Holstein-Sonderburg-Glücksburg)	28 September 1636	13 June 1668		29 April 1688 husband's death	6 August 1689	Frederick William I
	Sophia Charlotte of Hanover	Ernest Augustus, Elector of Hanover (Hanover)	30 October 1668	8 October 1684	29 April 1688 husband's accession	1 February 1705		Frederick III
	Sophia Louise of Mecklenburg-Schwerin	Frederick, Duke of Mecklenburg-Grabow (Mecklenburg-Schwerin)	6 May 1685	28 November 1708		25 February 1713 husband's death	29 July 1735	Frederick III
	Sophia Dorothea of Hanover	George I of Great Britain (Hanover)	16 March 1687	28 November 1706	25 February 1713 husband's accession	31 May 1740 husband's death	28 June 1757	Frederick William II
	Elisabeth Christine of Brunswick-Bevern	Ferdinand Albert II, Duke of Brunswick-Lüneburg (Brunswick-Bevern)	8 November 1715	12 June 1733	31 May 1740 husband's accession	17 August 1786 husband's death	13 January 1797	Frederick IV
	Frederika Louisa of Hesse-Darmstadt	Louis IX, Landgrave of Hesse-Darmstadt (Hesse-Darmstadt)	16 October 1751	14 July 1769	17 August 1786 husband's accession	16 November 1797 husband's death	25 February 1805	Frederick William III
	Louise of Mecklenburg-Strelitz	Charles II, Grand Duke of Mecklenburg-Strelitz (Mecklenburg-Strelitz)	10 March 1776	24 December 1793	16 November 1797 husband's accession	6 August 1806 dissolution of the Holy Roman Empire	9 July 1810	Frederick William IV
On 6 August 1806, the feudal designation of the Electorate and Margraviate of Brandenburg ended with the dissolution of the Holy Roman Empire.

== Margravine of Brandenburg-Ansbach, 1398–1791 ==
House of Hohenzollern
Picture	Name	Father	Birth	Marriage	Became Margravine	Ceased to be Margravine	Death	Spouse
	Elisabeth of Bavaria	Frederick, Duke of Bavaria (Wittelsbach)	1383	18 September 1401		20 September 1440 husband's death	13 November 1442	Frederick I
	Margaret of Baden	Jacob, Margrave of Baden-Baden (Zähringen)	1431	12 November 1446		24 October 1457		Albert III Achilles
	Anna of Saxony	Frederick II, Elector of Saxony (Wettin)	7 March 1437	12 November 1458		11 March 1486 husband's death	31 October 1512	Albert III Achilles
	Sophia of Poland	Casimir IV Jagiellon (Jagiellon)	6 May 1464	14 February 1479	11 March 1486 husband's accession	5 October 1512		Frederick II
	Emilie of Saxony	Henry IV, Duke of Saxony (Wettin)	27 July 1516	25 August 1533	4 April 1536 husband's accession	27 December 1543 husband's death	9 April 1591	George
	Elisabeth of Brandenburg-Küstrin	John, Margrave of Brandenburg-Küstrin (Hohenzollern)	29 August 1540	26 December 1558		8 March 1578		George Frederick
	Sophie of Brunswick-Lüneburg	William, Duke of Brunswick-Lüneburg (Welf)	30 October 1563	3 May 1579		25 April 1603 husband's death	14 January 1639	George Frederick
	Sophie of Solms-Laubach	John George I, Count of Solms-Laubach (Solms-Laubach)	15 May 1594	14 October 1612		7 March 1625 husband's death	16 May 1651	Joachim Ernest
	Henriette Louise of Württemberg-Mömpelgard	Louis Frederick, Duke of Württemberg-Montbéliard (Württemberg)	30 June 1623	31 August 1642		3 September 1650		Albert II
	Sophie Margarete of Oettingen-Oettingen	Joachim Ernest, Count of Oettingen-Oettingen (Oettingen-Oettingen)	19 December 1634	15 October 1651		5 August 1664		Albert II
	Christine of Baden-Durlach	Frederick VI, Margrave of Baden-Durlach (Baden)	22 April 1645	6 August 1665		22 October 1667 husband's death	21 December 1705	Albert II
	Johanna Elisabeth of Baden-Durlach	Frederick VI, Margrave of Baden-Durlach (Baden)	6 November 1651	5 February 1672		28 September 1680		John Frederick
	Eleonore Erdmuthe of Saxe-Eisenach	John George I, Duke of Saxe-Eisenach (Wettin)	13 April 1662	4 November 1681		22 March 1686 husband's death	19 September 1696	John Frederick
	Christiane Charlotte of Württemberg-Winnental	Frederick Charles, Duke of Württemberg-Winnental (Württemberg)	20 August 1694	28 August 1709		7 January 1723 husband's death	25 December 1729	William Frederick
	Fredericka Louise of Prussia	Frederick William I of Prussia (Hohenzollern)	29 August 1714	30 May 1729		3 August 1757 husband's death	4 February 1784	Charles William
	Frederica Caroline of Saxe-Coburg-Saalfeld	Francis Josias, Duke of Saxe-Coburg-Saalfeld (Wettin)	24 June 1735	22 November 1754	3 August 1757 husband's accession	18 February 1791		Christian II Frederick
	Elizabeth Berkeley	Augustus Berkeley, 4th Earl of Berkeley (Berkeley)	17 December 1750	30 October 1791		2 December 1791 husband's abdication	13 January 1828	Christian II Frederick
On 2 December 1791, Christian II Frederick sold the sovereignty of his principalities to king Frederick William II of Prussia.

== Margravine of Brandenburg-Kulmbach, 1398–1604 ==
House of Hohenzollern
Picture	Name	Father	Birth	Marriage	Became Margravine	Ceased to be Margravine	Death	Spouse
	Margaret of Bohemia	Charles IV, Holy Roman Emperor (Luxembourg)	29 September 1373	1381	21 January 1398 husband's accession	4 June 1410		John I
	Elisabeth of Bavaria	Frederick, Duke of Bavaria (Wittelsbach)	1383	18 September 1401	11 June 1420 husband's accession	20 September 1440 husband's death	13 November 1442	Frederick I
	Barbara of Saxe-Wittenberg	Rudolf III, Duke of Saxe-Wittenberg (Ascania)	after 1406	before 26 May 1416	20 September 1440 husband's accession	1457 husband's abdication	10 October 1465	John II
	Margaret of Baden	Jacob, Margrave of Baden-Baden (Zähringen)	1431	12 November 1446	1457 husband's accession	24 October 1457		Albert III Achilles
	Anna of Saxony	Frederick II, Elector of Saxony (Wettin)	7 March 1437	12 November 1458		11 March 1486 husband's death	31 October 1512	Albert III Achilles
	Sophia of Poland	Casimir IV Jagiellon (Jagiellon)	6 May 1464	14 February 1479	26 February 1495 husband's accession	5 October 1512		Frederick II
	Susanna of Bavaria	Albert IV, Duke of Bavaria (Wittelsbach)	2 April 1502	25 August 1518		21 September 1527 husband's death	23 April 1543	Casimir
	Elisabeth of Brandenburg-Küstrin	John, Margrave of Brandenburg-Küstrin (Hohenzollern)	29 August 1540	26 December 1558		8 March 1578		George Frederick
	Sophie of Brunswick-Lüneburg	William, Duke of Brunswick-Lüneburg (Welf)	30 October 1563	3 May 1579		25 April 1603 husband's death	14 January 1639	George Frederick
Christian, Margrave of Brandenburg-Kulmbach, moved the seat of his Margraviate to Bayreuth in 1604.

== Margravine of Brandenburg-Bayreuth, 1604–1791 ==
House of Hohenzollern
Picture	Name	Father	Birth	Marriage	Became Margravine	Ceased to be Margravine	Death	Spouse
	Marie of Prussia	Albert Frederick, Duke of Prussia (Hohenzollern)	23 January 1579	29 April 1604	1604 husband's accession	21 February 1649		Christian
	Erdmuthe Sophie of Saxony	John George II, Elector of Saxony (Wettin)	25 February 1644	29 October 1662		22 June 1670		Christian Ernest
	Sophie Louise of Württemberg-Stuttgart	Eberhard III, Duke of Württemberg (Württemberg)	19 February 1642	8 February 1671		3 October 1702		Christian Ernest
	Elisabeth Sophie of Brandenburg	Frederick William I, Elector of Brandenburg (Hohenzollern)	5 April 1674	30 March 1703		20 May 1712 husband's death	22 November 1748	Christian Ernest
	Sophie of Saxe-Weissenfels	John Adolph I, Duke of Saxe-Weissenfels (Wettin)	2 August 1684	16 October 1699	20 May 1712 husband's accession	18 December 1726 husband's death	6 May 1752	George William
	Wilhelmine of Prussia	Frederick William I of Prussia (Hohenzollern)	3 July 1709	30 November 1731	17 May 1735 husband's accession	14 October 1758		Frederick IV
	Sophie Caroline Marie of Brunswick-Wolfenbüttel	Charles I, Duke of Brunswick-Wolfenbüttel (Welf)	7 October 1737	20 September 1759		26 February 1763 husband's death	23 December 1817	Frederick IV
	Victoria Charlotte of Anhalt-Zeitz-Hoym	Victor I, Prince of Anhalt-Bernburg-Schaumburg-Hoym (Ascania)	25 September 1715	26 April 1732	26 February 1763 husband's accession	1764 divorce	4 February 1792	Frederick Christian
	Frederica Caroline of Saxe-Coburg-Saalfeld	Francis Josias, Duke of Saxe-Coburg-Saalfeld (Wettin)	24 June 1735	22 November 1754	20 January 1769 husband's accession	18 February 1791		Christian Frederick
	Elizabeth Berkeley	Augustus Berkeley, 4th Earl of Berkeley (Berkeley)	17 December 1750	30 October 1791		2 December 1791 husband's abdication	13 January 1828	Christian Frederick
On 2 December 1791, Christian II Frederick sold the sovereignty of his principalities to king Frederick William II of Prussia.

=== Margravine of Brandenburg-Bayreuth-Kulmbach, 1655–1726 ===
House of Hohenzollern
Picture	Name	Father	Birth	Marriage	Became Margravine	Ceased to be Margravine	Death	Spouse
	Marie Elisabeth of Schleswig-Holstein-Sonderburg-Glücksburg	Philipp, Duke of Schleswig-Holstein-Sonderburg-Glücksburg (Schleswig-Holstein-Sonderburg-Glücksburg)	26 July 1628	10 December 1651	11 March 1664 husband's accession	6 June 1664		George Albert
	Sophie Marie of Solms-Baruth	Johann Georg II, Count of Solms-Baruth (Solms-Baruth)	5 March 1626	11 November 1665		27 September 1666 husband's death	16 April 1688	George Albert
	Sophie Christiane of Wolfstein	Albert Frederick, Count of Wolfstein-Sulzbürg (Wolfstein)	24 October 1667	14 August 1687		5 April 1708 husband's death	23 August 1737	Christian Henry
	Dorothea of Schleswig-Holstein-Sonderburg-Beck	Frederick Louis, Duke of Schleswig-Holstein-Sonderburg-Beck (Schleswig-Holstein-Sonderburg-Beck)	24 November 1685	17 April 1709		1724 marriage dissolved	25 December 1761	George Frederick Charles
In 1726 George Frederick Charles became Margrave of Brandenburg-Bayreuth.

== Margravine of Brandenburg-Küstrin, 1535–1571 ==
House of Hohenzollern
Picture	Name	Father	Birth	Marriage	Became Margravine	Ceased to be Margravine	Death	Spouse
	Catherine of Brunswick-Wolfenbüttel	Henry V, Duke of Brunswick-Lüneburg (Welf)	1518	31 December 1537		13 January 1571 husband's death	16 May 1574	John
The Margraviate of Brandenburg-Küstrin was absorbed in 1571 into the Margraviate and Electorate of Brandenburg.

== Margravine of Brandenburg-Schwedt, 1688–1788 ==
House of Hohenzollern
Picture	Name	Father	Birth	Marriage	Became Margravine	Ceased to be Margravine	Death	Spouse
	Johanna Charlotte of Anhalt-Dessau	John George II, Prince of Anhalt-Dessau (Ascania)	6 April 1682	25 January 1699		19 December 1711 husband's death	31 March 1750	Philip William
	Sophie Dorothea of Prussia	Frederick William I of Prussia (Hohenzollern)	25 January 1719	10 November 1734		13 November 1765		Frederick William
	Leopoldine Marie of Anhalt-Dessau	Leopold I, Prince of Anhalt-Dessau (Ascania)	12 December 1716	13 February 1739	4 March 1771 husband's accession	27 January 1782		Frederick Henry
In 1788 the title was incorporated into the Kingdom of Prussia.

== See also ==
- List of Prussian consorts
- List of German queens
- Princess of Orange
- Princess of Neuchâtel
- Duchess of Saxe-Lauenburg
- Grand Duchess of Posen
- List of consorts of Hohenzollern
