= Henry V of Plauen =

Burgrave of Plauen

- Born: 9 October 1533; Andělská Hora
- Died: 24 December 1568 (aged 35); Hof
- Burial: Schleiz
- Spouse: Dorothy Catherine of Brandenburg-Ansbach
- Father: Henry IV of Plauen
- Mother: Margaret Countess of Salm and Neuburg

Henry V of Plauen (9 October 1533, Andělská Hora – 24 December 1568, Hof; buried in the Mountain Church in Schleiz) was Burgrave of Meissen and Lord of Plauen and Voigtsberg.

== Life ==
Henry V was the older of the two sons of Burgrave Henry IV of Plauen from his marriage to Margaret Countess of Salm and Neuburg (1517–1573).

On the death of his father, Henry V was still a minor. Therefore, King Ferdinand of Bohemia promised about a month after his father's death to protect him and his younger brother against the princes of Reuss. Henry IV had not only left his sons extensive holdings, but also a high debt and a disputes with the princes of Reuss. New debts arose from further court cases against the Reuss family.

After Henry V had come of age, he at first ruled for himself and on behalf of his younger brother Henry VI of Plauen; later they ruled together.

Henry married on 25 August 1555 Dorothy Catherine of Brandenburg-Ansbach (1538–1604) from the Franconian House of Hohenzollern. She was a daughter of Margrave Georg the Pious of Brandenburg-Ansbach (1484–1543) and his third wife Emilie of Saxony (1516–1591). The four sons of this marriage, all of which were named Henry, all died shortly after birth.

As early as 1556, the brothers lost by an imperial arbitration, the Franconian districts of Hof and Schauenstein to an imperial escrow. Their father had conquered these in a war against the outlawed Margrave Albert II Alcibiades. After the death of Albert Alcibiades and the extinction of his line, the margraviates Ansbach and Kulmbach were merged into margraviate of Brandenburg-Bayreuth and the young Margrave George Frederick of Brandenburg-Bayreuth, the brother of Henry's wife, ruled these territories.

In May 1559, the baronies of Plauen en Voigtsberg and the district of Schöneck were pledged to Elector August of Saxony.

With the decision of the court in Vienna of 28 September 1560, the brothers lost the barony of Greiz to the princes of Reuss and they had to share Gera and Schleiz with them, effective 1 January 1561. The brothers only retained their estates in Bohemia and the Bohemian fiefs Lobel and Posterstein Castle. The dispute with the princes of Reuss came to an end with a new treaty, confirmed by the emperor and sealed in Prague on 9 May 1562. On 14 March 1562 was the emperor invested the two brothers with the baronies of Plauen, Voigtsberg, Schleiz and Lobel and the districts Pausa and Schoeneck.

In 1563, the brothers divided their lands between them. Henry V would receive the Bohemian estates, the Lordships of Plauen and Voigtsberg and the district of Schoeneck. These lands had been pledged to Elector August of Saxony. When Henry V tried to redeem them, he found that money was no longer available. Thus, the heartland of Plauen was forever lost to Saxony. In 1564, Henry V lost the Bohemian barony of Loket to the crown. In 1567, he had to transfer the baronies of Andělská Hora, Bochov, Kraslice and Toužim to the Gera heirs of Lobkowicz and Hassenstein.

Completely impoverished, the brother of his wife Dorothy Catherine gave him a suitable a house in Hof. He died there on 24 December 1568 and was buried in the Mountain Church in Schleiz.

Dorothy Catherine received Toužim as a widow seat from the heirs of Gera and died there on 8 January 1604. Four years after her death, her second cousin, the Elector Christian II of Saxony, organized her burial in the St John's Church in Plauen.
