= Emilie of Saxony =

Margravine of Brandenburg-Ansbach (1516–1591)

- Margravine of Brandenburg-Ansbach
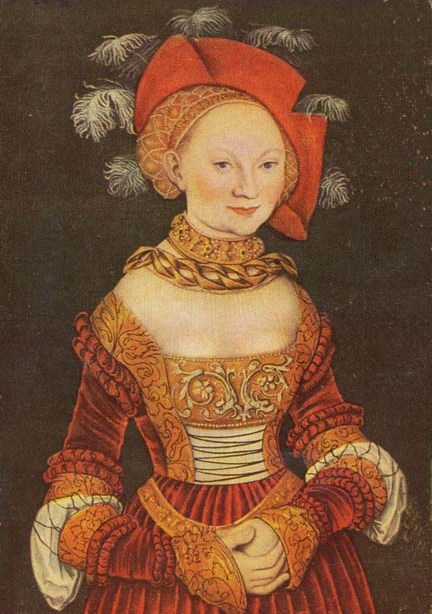
- Lucas Cranach the Elder - Emilie of Saxony, detail of a painting from 1535, oil on a poplar panel, Kunsthistorisches Museum, Vienna
- Tenure: 1536–1543
- Born: 27 July 1516; Freiberg
- Died: 9 April 1591 (aged 74); Ansbach
- Spouse: George, Margrave of Brandenburg-Ansbach (m. 1533; died 1543)
- Issue: Sophie, Duchess of Legnica; Barbara; Dorothy Catherine, Burgravine of Meissen; George Frederick, Margrave of Brandenburg-Ansbach
- House: Wettin
- Father: Henry IV, Duke of Saxony
- Mother: Catherine of Mecklenburg

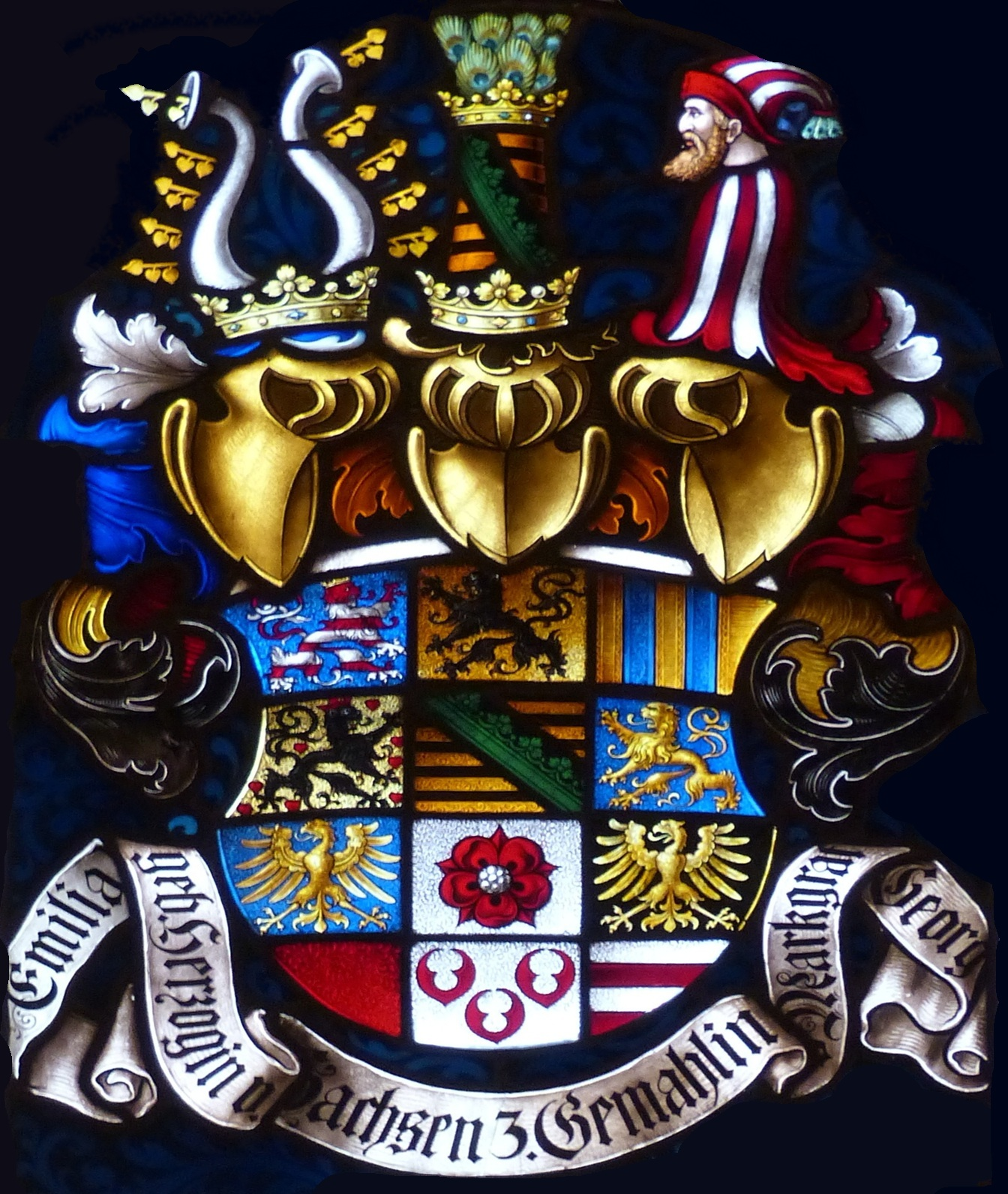

Emilie of Saxony (27 July 1516 – 9 April 1591) was Margravine of Brandenburg-Ansbach as the third wife of Margrave George the Pious of Brandenburg-Ansbach. As her husband's prior wives died before his accession, Emilie of Saxony was the only spouse to hold the title of Margravine.

== Life ==
Emilie was the daughter of the Duke Henry IV of Saxony and his wife Catherine of Mecklenburg. She was a member of the House of Wettin.

On 25 August 1533 Emilie of Saxony married the much older George of Brandenburg, the future Margrave of Brandenburg-Ansbach, who had been recognised as the duke of Silesia. She was seventeen years old. He also administered Brandenburg-Kulmbach on behalf of Albert, the son of his deceased brother Casimir. The marriage produced the heir he had hoped for, a son, George Frederick, later Margrave of Brandenburg-Ansbach.

After the death of her husband in 1543, Emilie was the legal guardian of her son, George Frederick, who was a minor, until 1556. She provided George Frederick with a humanistic education. However, the regency of Brandenburg-Ansbach was administered jointly by the reigning Electors of Saxony, Electors of Brandenburg, and the Landgrave of Hesse, Philip I.

Emilie was described as wise, virtuous and pious. She was a strict Lutheran and actively opposed Catholicism in the territories of her husband and son. In later life she retired to her widow seat.

== Children ==
Her children with George the Pious of Brandenburg-Ansbach included the following:

1. Sophie (1535–1587), married in 1560 Duke Henry XI of Legnica (1539–1588)
2. Barbara (1536–1591)
3. Dorothy Catherine (1538–1604), married in 1556 Henry V, Burgrave of Plauen, Burgrave of Meissen
4. George Frederick (1539–1603), Margrave of Brandenburg-Ansbach; married first, in 1558, Princess Elisabeth of Brandenburg-Küstrin (1540–1578), second, in 1579, Princess Sophie of Brunswick-Lüneburg (1563–1639)

Emilie of Saxony House of Wettin Born: 27 July 1516 Died: 9 April 1591
German nobility
Vacant Title last held by Sophia of Poland	Margravine of Brandenburg-Ansbach; 4 April 1536 - 27 December 1543	Vacant Title next held by Elisabeth of Brandenburg-Küstrin
