= Sophie of Brandenburg-Ansbach =

- Born: 23 March 1535; Ansbach
- Died: 22 February 1587 (aged 51); Legnica
- Spouse: Henry XI of Legnica
- House: House of Hohenzolern
- Father: George of Brandenburg-Ansbach-Kulmbach
- Mother: Emilie of Saxony

Sophie of Brandenburg-Ansbach (23 March 1535 in Ansbach – 22 February 1587 in Legnica) was a princess of Brandenburg-Ansbach and by marriage Duchess of Legnica.

== Life ==
Sophie was a daughter of the Margrave George of Brandenburg-Ansbach-Kulmbach (1484–1543) from his third marriage to Emilie of Saxony (1516–1591), daughter of the Duke Henry IV of Saxony.

She married on 11 November 1560 in Legnica Duke Henry XI of Legnica (1539–1588). The marriage served to consolidate Sophie's father's position as Duke in Silesia. The marriage proved unhappy, which was also due to a significant irritability on Sophie's side.

Sophie is not to be confused with her eponymous aunt (1485–1537), who was also Duchess of Legnica.

== Offspring ==
From her marriage, Sophie had the following children:

1. Katharina Sophie (b. 7 August 1561 – d. Schloss Friedrichsburg bei Vohenstrauss, 10 May 1608), married on 26 February 1587 to Frederick, Count Palatine of Zweibrücken-Vohenstrauss-Parkstein.
2. Anna Maria (b. 3 January 1563 – d. Amberg, 28 February 1620).
3. Emilia (b. 26 December 1563 – d. Schloss Friedrichsburg bei Vohenstrauss, 9 November 1618).
4. A son (b. and d. before 16 January 1565).
5. George Frederick (b. 11 September 1565 – d. 14 November 1565).
6. Sabina Barbara (b. 8 January 1571 – d. 14 December 1572).
