= Dorothy Catherine of Brandenburg-Ansbach =

Burggräfin of Meissen

- Born: 23 February 1538; Ansbach
- Died: 18 January 1604 (aged 65); Toužim
- Spouse: Henry V, Burgrave of Plauen
- Father: George, Margrave of Brandenburg-Ansbach
- Mother: Emilie of Saxony

Dorothy Catherine of Brandenburg-Ansbach (23 February 1538, Ansbach – 18 January 1604, Toužim) was a princess of Brandenburg-Ansbach and by marriage burgravine of Meissen.

== Life ==
Dorothy Catherine was a daughter of the Margrave George of Brandenburg-Ansbach (1484–1543) from his third marriage to Emilie (1516–1591), daughter of Duke Henry of Saxony.

She married on 2 February 1556 in Gera Henry V of Plauen, Burgrave of Meissen (1533–1568). The wedding of the financially ailing burgrave was celebrated with splendor: 1,500 guests were there, with 970 horses, 250 of them noblemen. The wedding celebration plunged Henry into considerable debt, which caused him to conclude the treaty of Annaberg with Elector August of Saxony a few weeks later, on 13 March. This treaty led to the loss of Vogtland.

From her marriage, Dorothy Catherine had four sons, all named Henry. They were born between 1557 and 1567; they all died in infancy.

Dorothy Catherine died in 1604 and was buried next to her husband in the Mountain Church in Schleiz.
