= Sabina of Brandenburg-Ansbach =

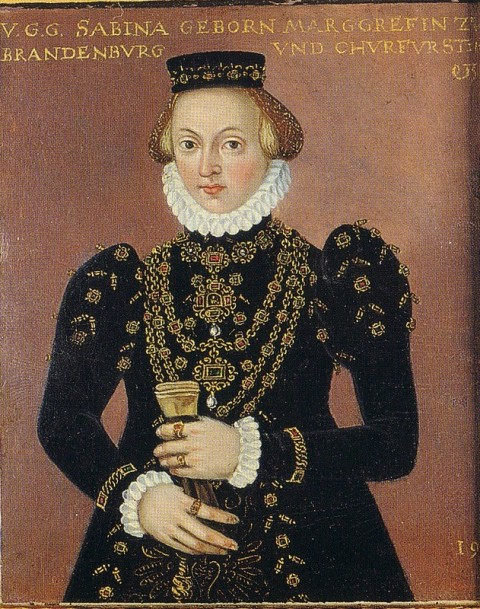

Electress consort of Brandenburg
- Tenure: 3 January 1571 - 2 November 1575
- Born: 12 May 1529; Ansbach
- Died: 2 November 1575 (aged 46); Berlin
- Burial: Berlin
- Spouse: John George of Brandenburg
- Issue Detail: Erdmuthe, Duchess of Pomerania; Anna Maria, Duchess of Pomerania; Sophie, Electress of Saxony
- House: Hohenzollern
- Father: George of Brandenburg-Ansbach
- Mother: Hedwig of Münsterberg-Oels

Sabina of Brandenburg-Ansbach (12 May 1529 – 2 November 1575) was a princess of Brandenburg-Ansbach and Electress of Brandenburg by marriage.

== Life ==
Sabina was the daughter of George, Margrave of Brandenburg-Ansbach (1484–1543) from his second marriage to Hedwig of Münsterberg-Oels (1508–1531), daughter of the Duke Charles I of Münsterberg-Oels. The princess was brought up by her stepmother Emilie of Saxony in the Lutheran faith.

On 12 February 1548 Sabina married Elector John George of Brandenburg (1525–1598) in Ansbach. His first wife Sophie of Legnica was Sabina's cousin. The day before the wedding ceremony, she solemnly renounced her possible paternal inheritance. The district, city and castle of Plauen were made over to her as her Wittum. Since Plauen, like all districts of Brandenburg, was not free of debt, lengthy negotiations about the compensation for her dowry of 12,000 guilders led to the district and monastery of Spandau also being assigned to her.

Sabina's husband was heir apparent to the Electorate of Brandenburg for 23 years. The couple spent this time on various castles in the territories of Brandenburg. The family's official residence was Zechlin castle in Rheinsberg near Wittstock. Here Sabina cared for her own children and also for her stepson Joachim Friedrich, who later became Elector of Brandenburg. Sabina's thrifty life style caused Rheinsberg to prosper for a while.

After Sabina's husband became Elector in 1571, she had an influence on religious affairs and was a patron of churches and schools. She supported the sick and the poor and had regular personal contact with the doctor Leonhard Thurneysser.

Sabina died on 2 November 1575 and was buried in the Berlin Cathedral.

== Offspring ==
From her marriage Sabina had the following children:

1. George Albert (19 February 1555 – 8 January 1557)
2. John (1557 – died young), twin with Albert
3. Albert (1557 – died young), twin with John
4. Magdalena Sabina (1559 – died young)
5. Erdmuthe (26 June 1561 – 13 November 1623), married in 1577 to Duke John Frederick of Pomerania
6. Marie (1562 – died young)
7. Hedwig (1563 – died young)
8. Magdalena (1564 – died young)
9. Margaret (1565 – died young)
10. Anna Maria (3 February 1567 – 4 November 1618), married in 1581 to Duke Barnim X of Pomerania
11. Sophie (6 June 1568 – 7 December 1622), married in 1582 to Elector Christian I of Saxony

== Notes ==
Sabina of Brandenburg-Ansbach House of Hohenzollern Born: 12 May 1529 Died: 2 November 1575
German nobility
Preceded by Hedwig of Poland	Electress consort of Brandenburg; 3 January 1571 – 2 November 1575	Vacant Title next held by Elisabeth of Anhalt-Zerbst
