= Catherine of Brunswick-Wolfenbüttel, Margravine of Brandenburg-Küstrin =

Catherine of Brunswick-Wolfenbüttel
- Margravine of Brandenburg-Küstrin
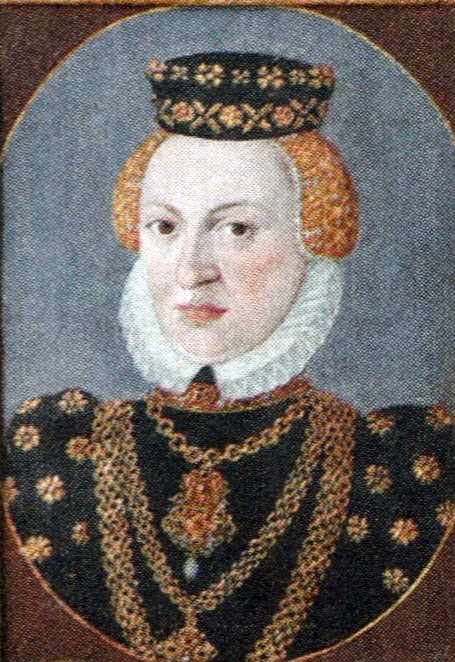
- Tenure: 1537–1571
- Born: 10 January 1518; Wolfenbüttel, Germany
- Died: 16 May 1574 (aged 55–56); Krosno Odrzańskie, Germany
- Spouse: John, Margrave of Brandenburg-Küstrin
- Issue: Elisabeth, Margravine of Brandenburg-Ansbach; Catherine, Electress of Brandenburg
- House: House of Welf
- Father: Henry V, Duke of Brunswick-Lüneburg
- Mother: Maria of Württemberg

Catherine of Brunswick-Wolfenbüttel (1518, in Wolfenbüttel – 16 May 1574, in Crossen) was a Princess of Brunswick-Wolfenbüttel by birth and by marriage Margravine of Brandenburg-Küstrin.

== Life ==
Catherine was a daughter of the Duke Henry V of Brunswick-Lüneburg (1489–1568) from his first marriage to Maria of Württemberg (1496–1541), daughter of Count Henry of Württemberg.

She married on 11 November 1537 in Wolfenbüttel Margrave John of Brandenburg-Küstrin (1513–1571). Catherine was instrumental in the spread of the Reformation in the Margraviate of Brandenburg.

Catherine was considered extremely frugal and thrifty, and she actively supported her husband. She had several outbuildings in Küstrin and a kitchen garden. She had so-called "wild garden" in a suburb of Küstrin and other goods in Schaumburg, Drew and her favorite seat Dębno, a gift from her husband. Catherine settled Dutch religious refugees in Dębno, which started a vibrant cloth-making industry. She built a school and a church and in 1562, Dębno was granted a city charter.

Catherine, who was described as very popular, was known by the population as Mother Kate. She founded the first pharmacy in Ośno Lubuskie and built another in Küstrin from which she provided the poor with free medicine. Catherine built numerous farms and dairies, which she administered herself and she also sold the harvest herself.

Catherine died in 1574. Her grave was discovered in 1999 in the ruins of the parish church in Küstrin by archaeologists from Szczecin.

The Katharinenstraße ("Catherine Street") in Berlin-Halensee is named after her.

== Issue ==
From her marriage to John, Catherine had two daughters:

- Elisabeth (1540–1578)

married in 1558 George Frederick I, Margrave of Brandenburg-Ansbach (1539–1603)

- Catherine (1549–1602)

married in 1570 Joachim Frederick, Elector of Brandenburg (1546–1608)

== Ancestors ==
Ancestors of Catherine of Brunswick-Wolfenbüttel, Margravine of Brandenburg-Küstrin

8. William II, Duke of Brunswick-Calenberg-Göttingen
4. Henry IV, Duke of Brunswick-Lüneburg
9. Elizabeth of Stolberg-Wernigerode
2. Henry V, Duke of Brunswick-Lüneburg
10. Eric II, Duke of Pomerania
5. Catherine of Pomerania
11. Sophia of Pomerania-Stolp
1. Catherine of Brunswick-Wolfenbüttel
12. Ulrich V, Count of Württemberg
6. Henry, Count of Württemberg
13. Elisabeth of Bavaria-Landshut
3. Maria of Württemberg
14. John IV, Count of Salm-Obersalm
7. Eva of Salm
15. Margaret of Sierck
