= Henry VI of Plauen =

- Born: 29 December 1536; Meissen
- Died: 22 January 1572 (aged 35); Schleiz
- Spouse: Catherine of Brunswick-Lüneburg-Gifhorn; Anna of Pomerania-Stettin
- Father: Henry V, Burgrave of Plauen
- Mother: Countess Margaret of Salm

Henry VI of Plauen (29 December 1536, Meissen – 22 January 1572 in Schleiz) was Burgrave of Meissen, Lord of Plauen and Lord of Schleiz and Lobenstein.

== Life ==
Henry VI was the younger of two sons of Henry IV, Burgrave of Plauen, from his marriage to Countess Margaret of Salm (1517–1573).

== Biography ==
After his father's death he and his older brother Henry V jointly ruled their extensive possessions. They also inherited a dispute with the Princely House of Reuss. However, they were both still minors, so a month after the death of their father, King Ferdinand of Bohemia promised to protect them against the Reuss family. In addition to the high debt they inherited from their father, they incurred new debt due to this court case against the Reuss family. In 1556, they lost the districts of Hof and Schauenstein by imperial arbitration.

In May 1559 the brothers had to pledge the Lordships of Plauen and Oelsnitz and the district of Schöneck to Elector August of Saxony. On 28 September 1560, the imperial court in Vienna ruled against them: they had to give the Lordship of Greiz to the Reuss family on 1 January 1561 and half each of the Lordships of Gera and Schleiz. All they had left were their Bohemian estates and the Bohemian fiefs of Úvalno (German: Lobenstein) and Posterstein Castle. The dispute with the Reuss family, however, reached a conclusion. It ended with a treaty, which was confirmed and sealed by the Emperor in Prague on 9 March 1562. On 14 March 1562, the brothers were invested by the Emperor.

In 1563 the brothers decided to divide their lands. Henry VI received the Lordships of Schleiz and Úvalno and the district of Pausa. When they had to repay the loan, they found that the money wasn't there (Henry VI was accused of having spent it) and as a result, the heartland of Plauen, the Lordships of Plauen and Oelsnitz and the district Schöneck were forever lost to Saxony.

In preparation for his marriage on 9 April 1564 at Fallersleben to Princess Catherine of Brunswick-Lüneburg-Gifhorn (born: 1548 in Gifhorn; died: 10 December 1565 in Schleiz) he pledged the district of Pausa to a citizen in Leipzig, who sold the claims in 1569 to Elector August of Saxony.

On 27 August 1566 Henry married again, this time with Anna of Pomerania-Stettin (born: 5 February 1531 in Stettin; died 13 October 1592 in Rosenburg). In constant shortage of money he pledged Úvalno in 1567 to the Schwarzburg family and 1569 to the Vitzthum of Eckstaedt family. He could not redeem this loan either, so he lost Úvalno as well.

Henry VI. died on 22 January 1572 in poverty as the last of the Vogts of Plauen. Both his marriages were childless. He was buried in the Mountain Church at Schleiz. His property passed to the Reuss family who contested control of the Lordship of Schleiz with Saalburg and Burgk with his widow for the next twenty years. Anna of Pomerania refused to leave her Wittum, which Henry had given her with the Emperor's confirmation, but without the consent of the Reuss family. Even after she remarried in 1576, Anne refused to give up Schleiz. The dispute was settled in 1590: Anna handed Schleiz over to the Reuss family, in exchange for a cash payment of 42250 guilders.

Henry VI. was a member of the ancient Plauen line and is only remotely related with the Reuss of Plauen at Greiz line, who later were the Princes of Reuss Elder Line Their common ancestor was Henry I, the founder of the House of Plauen, who lived in the 13th Century.
