= Elisabeth of Brandenburg-Küstrin =

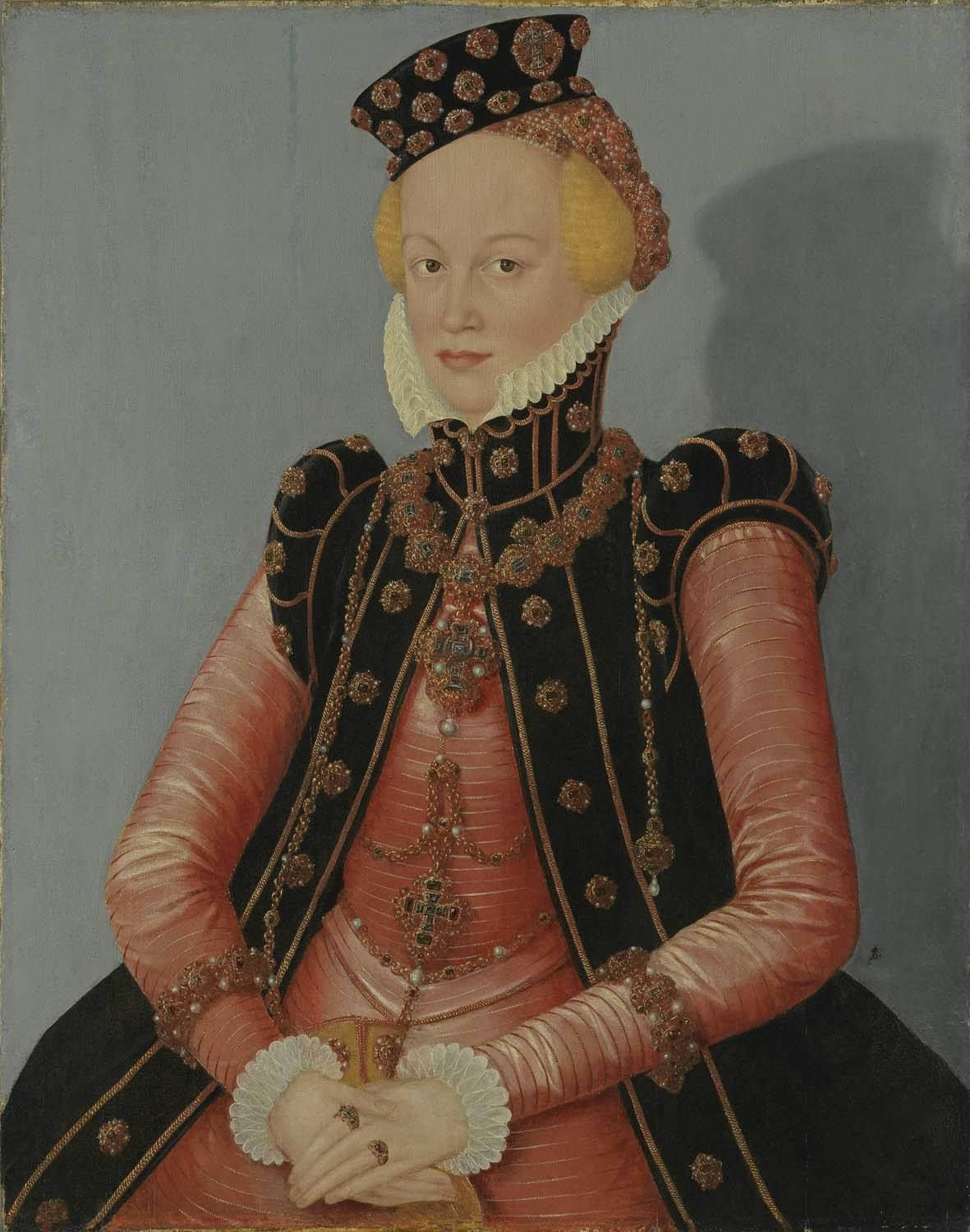
- Elisabeth of Brandenburg-Küstrin (painting by Lucas Cranach the Younger, 1579, Alte Pinakothek, Munich)

Margravine of Brandenburg-Ansbach
- Tenure: 1558-1578
- Born: 29 August 1540; Küstrin
- Died: 8 March 1578 (aged 37); Warsaw
- Burial: Königsberg Cathedral
- Spouse: George Frederick, Margrave of Brandenburg-Ansbach (m. 1558)
- House: House of Hohenzollern
- Father: John, Margrave of Brandenburg-Küstrin
- Mother: Catherine of Brunswick-Wolfenbüttel

Elizabeth of Brandenburg-Küstrin (29 August 1540 – 8 March 1578), was a princess of Brandenburg-Küstrin and margravine of Brandenburg-Ansbach and Brandenburg-Kulmbach by marriage.

== Life ==
Elizabeth was the elder of two daughters of Margrave John of Brandenburg-Küstrin (1513–1571) from his marriage to Catherine of Brunswick-Wolfenbüttel (1518–1574), daughter of the Duke Henry V of Brunswick-Lüneburg.

On 26 December 1558 Elisabeth married Margrave George Frederick I of Brandenburg-Ansbach-Kulmbach (1539–1603) in Küstrin. From 1577, he acted as governor in the Duchy of Prussia on behalf of Albert Frederick, Duke of Prussia.

Elisabeth died during her stay at the Warsaw court, where her husband was to be awarded the ducal title by the Polish king Stefan Batory. Elizabeth was buried in Königsberg Cathedral. Her husband ordered the Dutch sculptor Willem van Bloche to create a grave monument for her. It was completed in 1582 and was erected as a "governor monument" in the Cathedral.

Elisabeth of Brandenburg-Küstrin House of Hohenzollern Born: 29 August 1540 Died: 8 March 1578
German nobility
Vacant Title last held by Emilie of Saxony	Margravine of Brandenburg-Ansbach; 26 December 1558 - 8 March 1578	Vacant Title next held by Sophie of Brunswick-Lüneburg
Vacant Title last held by Susanna of Bavaria	Margravine of Brandenburg-Kulmbach; 26 December 1558 - 8 March 1578	Vacant Title next held by Sophie of Brunswick-Lüneburg
