= Von Plötzke =

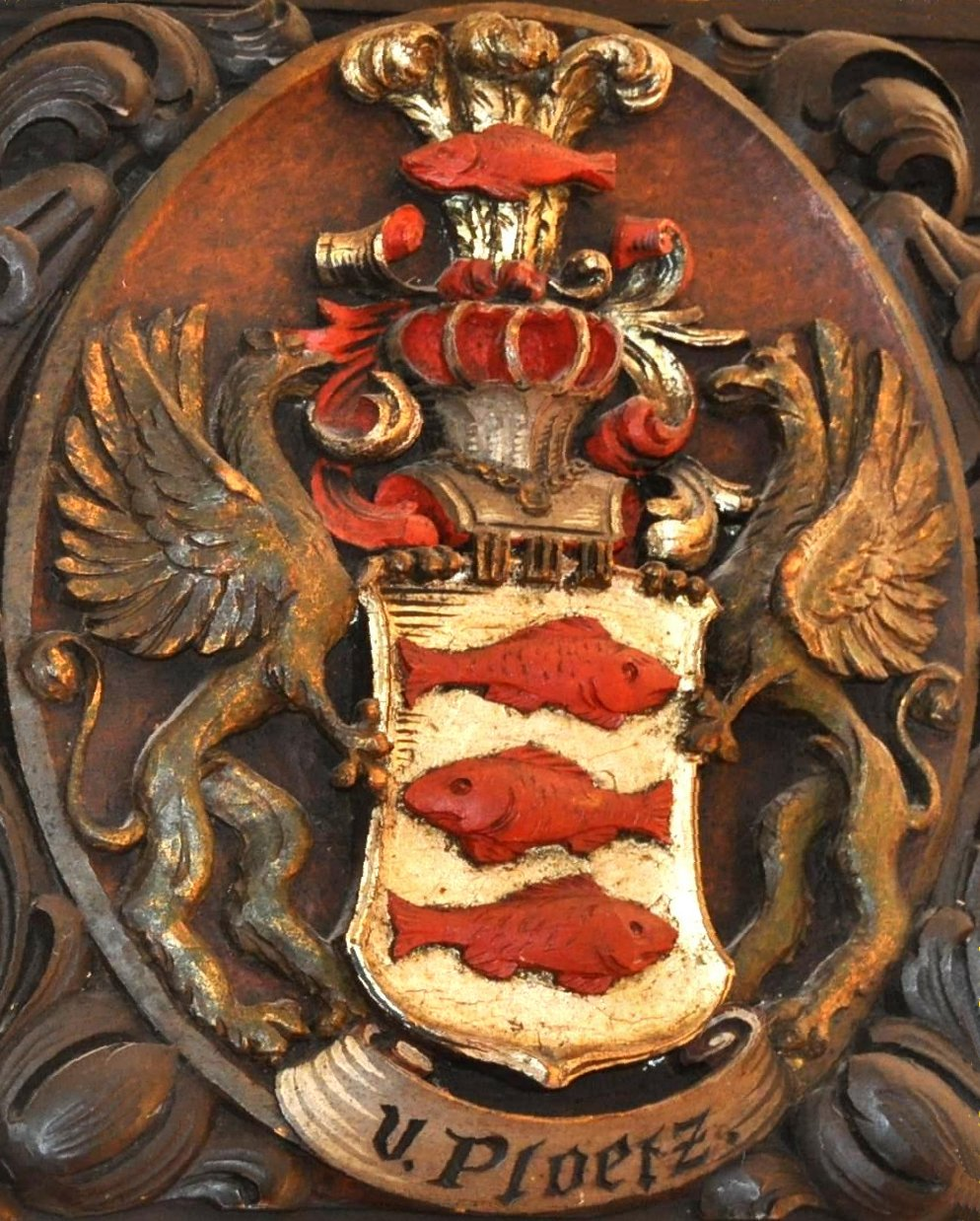
Coat of arms of Plötzkau family

The von Plötzke or von Plötzkau (earlier spelling Ploceke, Plocike) family is an old German noble family from Saxony and Masovia.

== History ==
Conrad de Ploceke for example, married the daughter of a lienholder of the Holy Roman Empire Duke Boleslaw III of Poland and his wife Salome von Berg Schelklingen.

Płock in Masovia, an independent duchy straddling Polish and Saxon territories until the death of the last duke of Masovia in 1526, came under the full rule of the Kingdom of Poland. The title of Duke of Masovia was retained but as a fief of Poland. The von Plötzke family were the hereditary Dukes of Masovia.

In the mid 13th century, after considerable disagreement with the reigning Piast dynasty in Poland, members of the family joined the knights of the Teutonic Order. Most notable was Heinrich von Plötzke, while born a Duke of Masovia, did not use the title and became a major officer (including Komtur) of the Knights.

Due to Plock and Masovia's location next to Poland and inter-marriage with Polish noble families, the family name is listed among both Polish and German noble families.

== Notable members ==
- Conrad von Plötzkau, Margrave of the Nordmark (died 1132), Margrave of the Nordmark and Count of Plötzkau
- Heinrich von Plötzke (also Henry of Płock, d. 1320), Land Master of Teutonic Prussia (1307–1309), Prussian Grand Commander (1309-1312) and then till 1320 Marshall of the Order of the Teutonic Knights
- Helperich von Plötzkau, Margrave of the Nordmark (died 1118), Count of Plötzkau and Walbeck, Margrave of the Nordmark
- Thietmar of Plötzkau (also Dietmar, d. 23 September 1148), as Thietmar II Bishop of Verden (1116–1148)

== See also ==
- Plötzkau
