= John, Margrave of Brandenburg-Küstrin =

John
- Margrave of Brandenburg-Küstrin
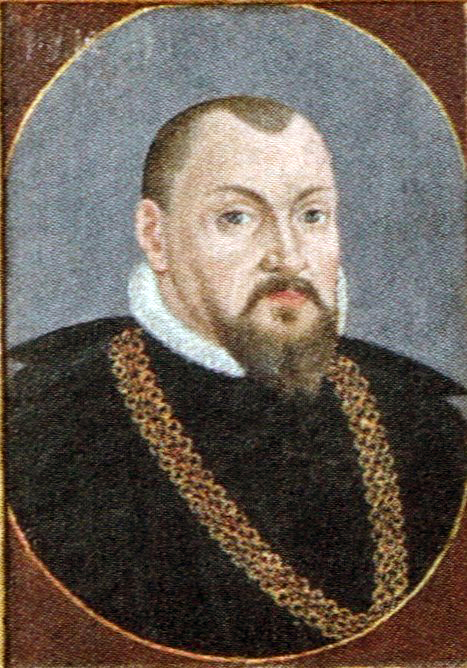
- Born: 3 August 1513
- Died: 13 January 1571 (aged 57)
- Spouse: Catherine of Brunswick-Wolfenbüttel
- Issue: Elisabeth, Margravine of Brandenburg-Ansbach; Catherine, Electress of Brandeburg
- House: House of Hohenzollern
- Father: Joachim I, Elector of Brandenburg
- Mother: Elizabeth of Denmark, Electress of Brandenburg

John of Brandenburg-Küstrin (German: Johann von Brandenburg-Küstrin, or Hans von Küstrin; 3 August 1513 – 13 January 1571), was a member of the House of Hohenzollern and a Margrave of Brandenburg-Küstrin.

== Life ==
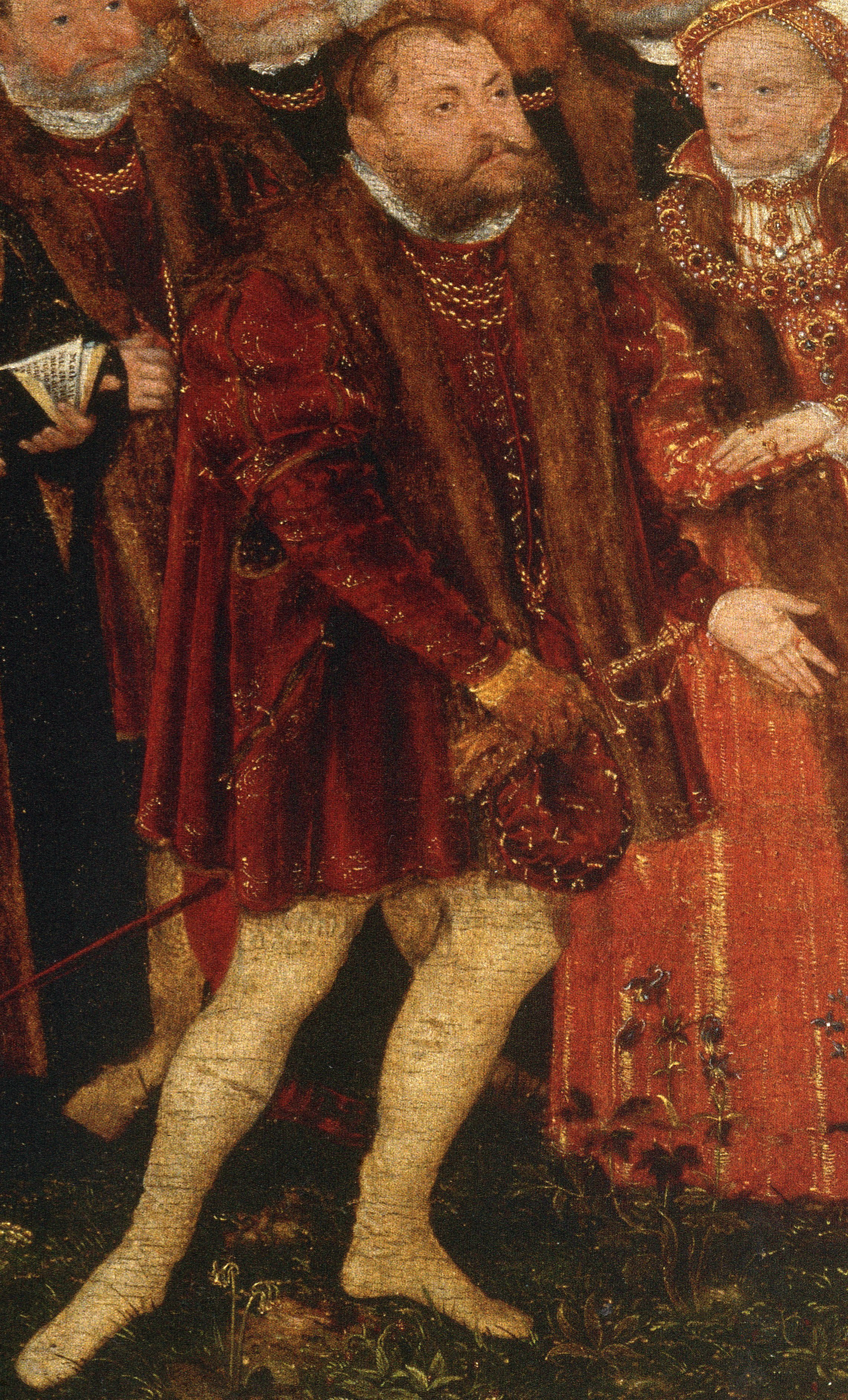
John of Brandenburg-Küstrin

John was the younger son of Joachim I Nestor of Brandenburg, and Elizabeth of Denmark, Electress of Brandenburg.

Joachim I had decreed in his will decreed that his country would be divided between his sons, John and Joachim II. When Joachim I died on 11 July 1535, the Margraviate of Brandenburg-Küstrin was created for John; it consisted of the territories of the New March with Dramburg and Schivelbein, the Sternberg Land, Crossen an der Oder with Züllichau and Sommerfeld and the Loardship of Cottbus with Peitz, altogether about 12,500 square kilometers. John chose Küstrin as his capital and started developing the city on the Oder into a fortress. Joachim II, the elder son, inherited the title of Elector and the rest of the Margraviate of Brandenburg.

Unlike his extravagant brother, John was deeply religious. He had much energy and insight into economic and political issues. He managed to militarily secure his margraviate and to stabilize its market economy. With his accession, the area was changed to Lutheranism and in 1538 he joined the Schmalkaldic League. However, in the Schmalkaldic War, he fought on the Catholic side, the side of Emperor Charles V, hoping to be rewarded with the Duchy of Pomerania. However, the Emperor only rewarded him with freedom of religion in the New March area. At the Imperial Diet in Augsburg in 1548, where Charles V dictated the Augsburg Interim, John came into conflict with the Emperor. John rejected the Interim and refused to participate in the Corpus Christi procession. John fell out of favour; he was not arrested, due to the intercession of King Ferdinand (the later Emperor Ferdinand I) and also because his brother Joachim was an Elector. After he returned to his Margraviate of Brandenburg-Küstrin, John strengthened its defenses and started planning an anti-Habsburg alliance, which however did not come about. He did not officially publish the Interim of Augsburg in his country.

A group of German princes led by Elector Maurice of Saxony, and supported by France, opposed the Interim of Augsburg. After a dispute with Maurice in the hunting castle Annaburg in Lochau in 1551, John decided not to join this group. Duke Albert of Prussia tried to persuade to John to side with Ducal Prussia, but he refused. After consultation with his brother, John decided not to press his claims on the Margraviate of Brandenburg-Kulmbach.

Joachim II died on 3 January 1571 and John died only 10 days later, on the 13th. He was buried in a crypt under the altar of the St. Mary church in Küstrin. As John did not have a male heir, his margraviate was reunited with the March of Brandenburg, which was then ruled by Joachim's son John George. John I of Brandenburg-Küstrin left a fortune of more than half a million guilders, while his brother left behind debts of 2.5 million guilders.

== Marriage and issue ==
John married on 11 November 1537 in Wolfenbüttel, Duchess Catherine of Brunswick-Wolfenbüttel (1518–1574). From this marriage, he had two daughters:

- Elisabeth (1540–1578)

married in 1558 Margrave George Frederick I of Brandenburg-Ansbach (1539–1603)

- Catherine (1549–1602)

married in 1570 Elector Joachim Frederick of Brandenburg (1546–1608)

== See also ==
- House of Hohenzollern
