= George, Margrave of Brandenburg-Ansbach =

German margrave (1484–1543)

George the Pious
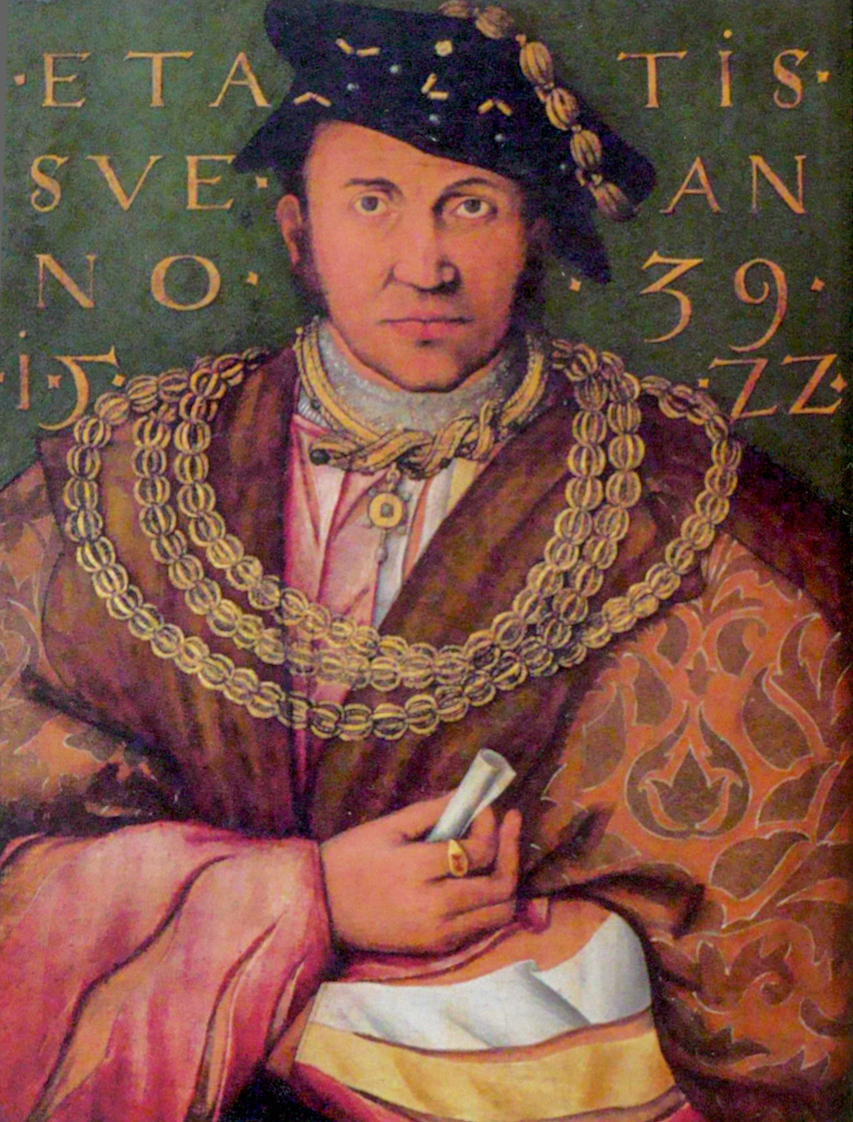
- Portrait by Hans Krell (1522)

Margrave of Ansbach
- Reign: 1536–1543
- Predecessor: Frederick I
- Successor: George Frederick
- Born: 4 March 1484; Ansbach, Principality of Ansbach
- Died: 27 December 1543 (aged 59); Ansbach, Principality of Ansbach
- Spouses: Beatrice de Frangepan (m. 1509; died 1510) Hedwig of Münsterberg-Oels (m. 1525; died 1531) Emilie of Saxony (m. 1533)
- Issue: Anna Maria, Duchess of Württemberg; Sabina, Electress of Brandenburg; Sophie, Duchess of Legnica; Barbara of Brandenburg-Ansbach; Dorothy Catherine, Burgravine of Meissen; George Frederick, Margrave of Brandenburg-Ansbach
- House: Hohenzollern
- Father: Frederick I, Margrave of Brandenburg-Ansbach
- Mother: Sophia of Poland

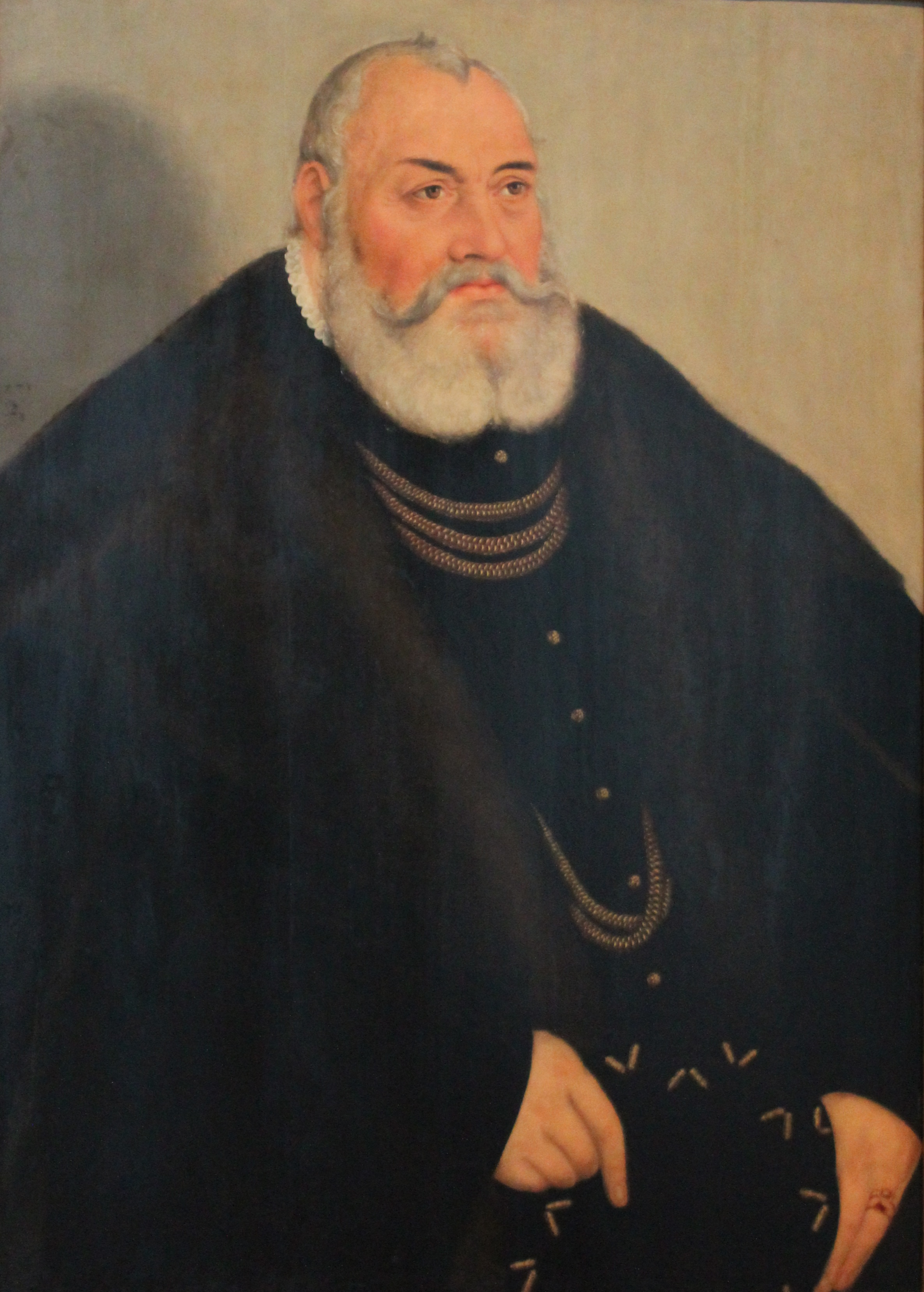
George the Pious, Margrave of Brandenburg-Ansbach by Lucas Cranach the Younger (1571)

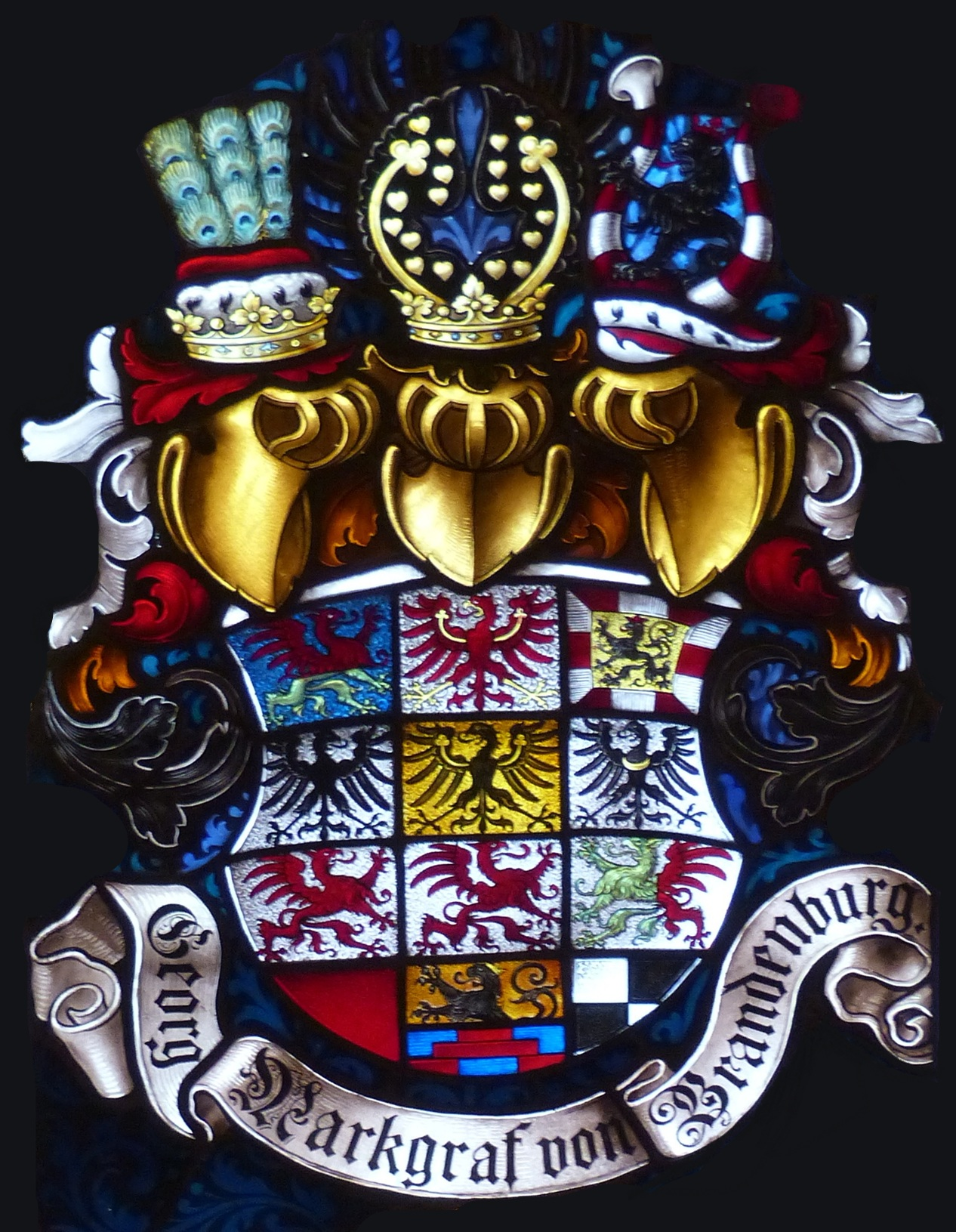
Coat of arms of George

George of Brandenburg-Ansbach (German: Georg; 4 March 1484 – 27 December 1543), known as George the Pious (Georg der Fromme), was a margrave of Brandenburg-Ansbach from the House of Hohenzollern.

== Early life ==
George was born in Ansbach, the second of eight sons of Margrave Frederick the Elder and Sophia of Poland, daughter of Casimir IV of Poland and Elisabeth of Habsburg. Through his mother, he was related to the royal court in Buda. He entered the service of his uncle, King Vladislaus II of Bohemia and Hungary, living at his court from 1506. The king received him as an adopted son, entrusted him in 1515 with the Duchy of Oppeln, and in 1516 made him member of the tutelary government instituted for Hungary, and tutor of his son Louis II of Hungary and Bohemia. In 1521 he made an arrangement with Petar Keglević and pulled back from Hungary and Croatia; this arrangement, accepted by Louis II in 1526, was not accepted by Holy Roman Emperor Ferdinand I until 1559.

== Career ==
=== Territories and influence ===
At the court of Hungary there were two parties arrayed against each other: the Magyar party under the leadership of Zápolyas and the German party under the leadership of George of Brandenburg, whose authority was increased by the acquisition of the duchies of Ratibor and Oppeln by hereditary treaties with their respective dukes and of the territories of Oderberg, Beuthen, and Tarnowitz as pledges from the king of Bohemia, who could not redeem his debts.

By the further appropriation of the Duchy of Jägerndorf, George came into possession of all Upper Silesia. As the owner and mortgagee of these territories he prepared the way for the introduction of the Protestant Reformation, here as well as in his native Franconia. Earlier than any other German prince or any other member of the Hohenzollern line including even his younger brother Albert, the Grand Master of the Teutonic Order, he turned his eyes and heart to the new faith proceeding from Wittenberg.

=== Conversion ===
The first reformatory writings began the work of winning him over to the evangelical cause. Martin Luther's powerful testimony of faith at the Diet of Worms in 1521 made an indelible impression upon his mind, and the vigorous sermons of evangelical preachers in the pulpits of St. Lawrence and St. Sebald in Nuremberg, during the diet there in 1522, deepened the impression. The study of Luther's translation of the New Testament, which appeared in 1522, established his faith on personal conviction. Moreover, he entered into correspondence with Luther, discussing with him the most important problems of faith, and in 1524 he met him personally during the negotiations concerning his brother Albert's secularization of the Teutonic Order's state of Prussia into the secular Duchy of Prussia.

After the accession of King Louis II, George was aided in his reforming efforts by Queen Maria, a sister of Charles V and Ferdinand I, who was favorably inclined toward the new doctrine. As the adviser of the young king, George firmly advocated the cause of the new gospel against the influences and intrigues of his clerical opponents and successfully prevented their violent measures. His relationship with Duke Frederick II of Liegnitz, Brieg, and Wohlau, and with Duke Charles I of Münsterberg-Oels, who had both admitted the Reformation into their territories, contributed not a little to the expansion of the gospel in his own lands. But it was his own personal influence, energy, and practical spirit that introduced the new doctrine and founded a new evangelical and churchly life. He made efforts to secure preachers of the new gospel from Hungary, Silesia, and Franconia, and tried to introduce the church order of Brandenburg-Nuremberg, which had already found acceptance in the Franconian territories.

=== Reformation in Franconia ===
In the hereditary lands Brandenburg-Ansbach in Franconia, where with his older brother Casimir of Brandenburg-Kulmbach had assumed the regency in place of their father, he encountered greater difficulties, although the popular spirit was inclined toward the Reformation. Owing to his marriage with a Bavarian princess and to his military command in the imperial service, his brother was allied more closely with the old church and resisted the new reforming efforts. But the pressure of the estates of the land soon compelled him to allow preaching according to Luther's doctrine, although he ensured retention of the old church ceremonies, even of those that were contrary to the new faith.

George protested against such half-measures and showed his dissatisfaction with the half-hearted resolutions of the state assembly of October 1526. It was only after the death of his brother that as sole ruler he could successfully undertake and carry out reformation in the Franconian territories, with the assistance of councillors such as Johann von Schwarzenberg and through the new resolutions of the state assembly of Brandenburg-Ansbach (1528). At the same time George maintained his correspondence with Luther and Philipp Melanchthon, discussing such questions as the evangelization of monasteries, the use of monastic property for evangelical purposes, and especially the foundation of lower schools for the people and of higher schools for the education of talented young men for the service of church and state. He despoiled the churches and cloisters in his domains of all their gold and silver, their monstrances, vessels, chalices, pearls, jewels, images and precious vestments. He used 50,000 florins of the proceeds to pay off Casimir's gambling debts and other liabilities, and he endowed his son Frederick with ecclesiastical benefices with a total revenue of 190,000 florins. He tried to gain, by his continued correspondence with Luther and other reformers such as Urbanus Rhegius, efficient men for the preaching of the gospel and for the organization of the evangelical church. Hand in hand with the Council of Nuremberg he worked for the institution of a church visitation on the model of that of the Electorate of Saxony, from which after repeated revisions and emendations the excellent church order of Brandenburg-Nuremberg of 1533 was developed. After its introduction in Nuremberg and his territories in Franconia, it was also introduced in his dominions in Upper Silesia.

=== Influence beyond his territories ===
George's influence manifested itself also in the development of the German Reformation as a whole. When a union of the evangelicals in upper and lower Germany was contemplated as a means of improved defense against the retaliatory measures of the Roman Catholic Church, George had a meeting with Elector John of Saxony at Schleitz in 1529, where they agreed on certain articles of faith and confession to be drawn up by Luther; the commission was executed in the seventeen articles of Schwabach on the basis of the fifteen theses of the Marburg Colloquy.

But neither at the Convention of Schwabach nor at that of Schmalkalden did George approve armed resistance against the emperor and his party, even in self-defense. He opposed the emperor energetically at the Diet of Augsburg in 1530, when the emperor demanded the prohibition of evangelical preaching. King Ferdinand made George the most alluring offers of Silesian possessions if he would support the emperor, but he strongly rejected them. Next to the elector of Saxony, he stands foremost among the princes who defended the reformed faith. After the death of his cousin, Joachim I, who was a strict Catholic, he assisted his sons in the introduction of the Reformation in the territories of the Electorate of Brandenburg. He took part in the religious colloquy of Regensburg in 1541 where Elector Joachim II made a last attempt to bridge the differences between the Catholics and Lutherans and with his nephew requested Luther's cooperation. The Diet of Regensburg was the last religious meeting which he attended.

He is one of the figures on the Prussian Homage painting by Jan Matejko.

== Family and children ==
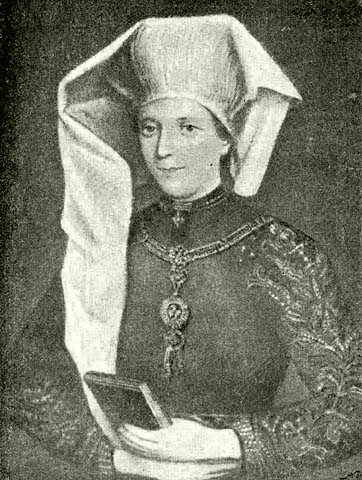
Beatrice de Frangepan, George's first wife.

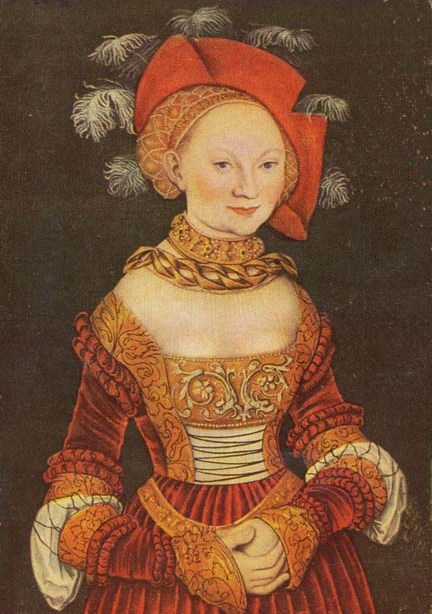
Emilie of Saxony, George's third wife.

George was married three times. His first marriage was to Beatrice de Frangepan (1480 – c. 1510) on 21 January 1509 in Gyula; the marriage produced no children.

George's second marriage took place on 9 January 1525, to Hedwig of Münsterberg-Oels (1508–1531), daughter of Charles I of Münsterberg-Oels; their marriage produced two daughters:

- Anna Maria of Brandenburg-Ansbach (28 December 1526 – 20 May 1589); married Christoph, Duke of Württemberg in 1544
- Sabina of Brandenburg-Ansbach (12 May 1529 – 2 November 1575); married John George, Elector of Brandenburg.

His third wife was Emilie of Saxony (27 July 1516 – 9 March 1591), daughter of Henry IV, Duke of Saxony, and Catherine of Mecklenburg on 25 August 1533:

- Sophie of Brandenburg-Ansbach (23 March 1535 – 12 February 1587) married Henry XI of Legnica on November 11, 1560.
- Barbara of Brandenburg-Ansbach (17 June 1536 – June 1591 in Kloster Himmelkron)
- Dorothy Catherine of Brandenburg-Ansbach (1538–1604); married in 1556 Henry V of Plauen, Burgrave of Meissen.
- George Frederick (1539–1603), who became Margrave of Brandenburg-Ansbach and Regent of the Duchy of Prussia.

== Sources ==
- Hohkamp, Michaela (2007). "Sisters, Aunts, and Cousins: Familial Architectures and the Political Field in Early Modern Europe". In Sabean, David Warren; Mathieu, Jon; Teuscher, Simon (eds.). Kinship in Europe: Approaches to Long-Term Development (1300-1900). Berghahn Books. ISBN 9780857456861.

George, Margrave of Brandenburg-Ansbach House of Hohenzollern Born: 4 March 1484 in Ansbach Died: 27 December 1543 ibidem
Regnal titles
Preceded by Frederick I	Margrave of Brandenburg-Ansbach; 1536–1543	Succeeded by George Frederick
Preceded by George	Duke of Jägerndorf; 1523–1543	Succeeded by George Frederick
Preceded by John II	Duke of Oppeln-Ratibor; 1532–1543	Succeeded by George Frederick
