= Sophie of Brunswick-Lüneburg =

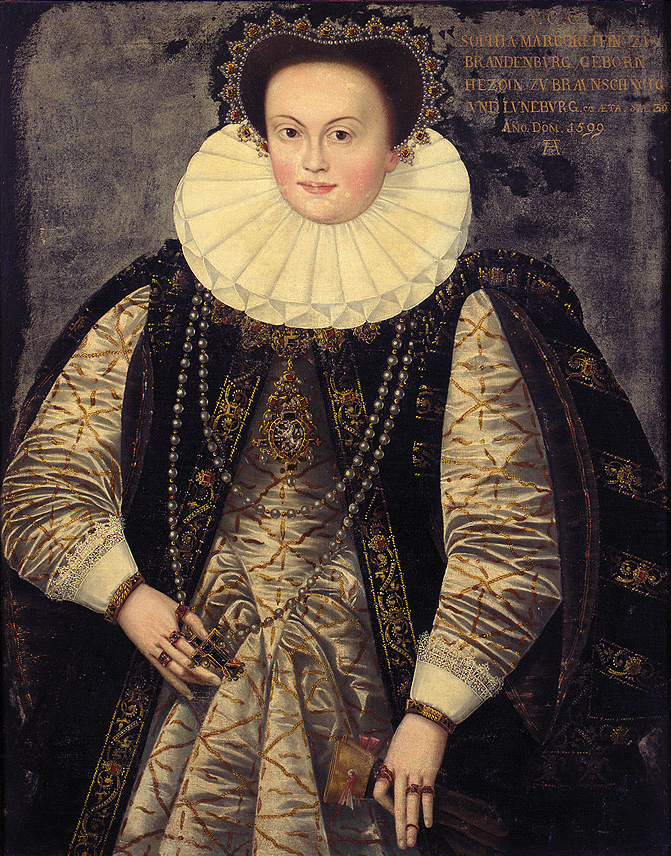
- Sophie of Brunswick-Lüneburg
- Born: 30 October 1564; Celle
- Died: 14 January 1639 (aged 74); Nuremberg
- Spouse: George Frederick, Margrave of Brandenburg-Ansbach
- Father: William, Duke of Brunswick-Lüneburg
- Mother: Dorothea of Denmark

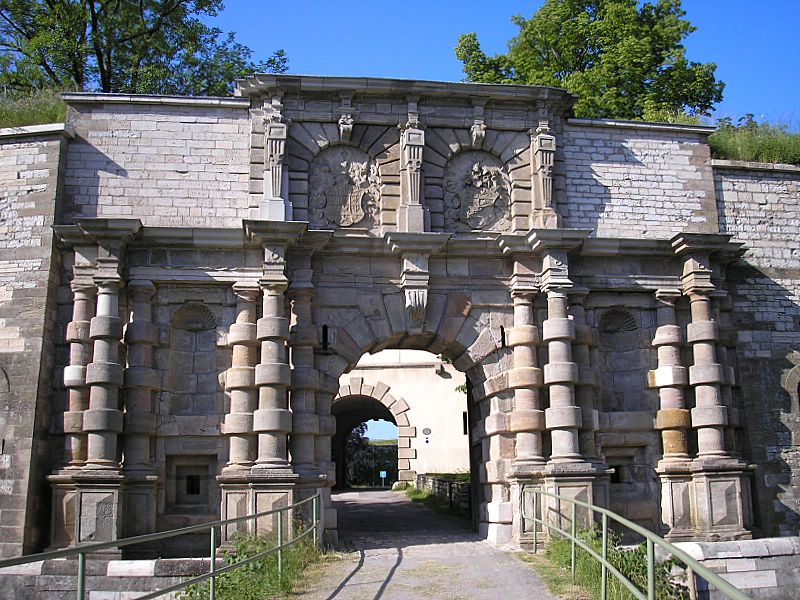
Show gate of Wülzburg Castle with the coats of arms of Sophie and her husband

Sophie of Brunswick-Lüneburg (30 October 1563 – 14 January 1639) was a member of the House of Brunswick-Lüneburg and margravine of Brandenburg-Ansbach and Brandenburg-Kulmbach and Duchess of Krnov by marriage.

== Life ==
Sophie was the eldest child of Duke William the Younger of Brunswick-Lüneburg (1535–1592) from his marriage to Dorothea of Denmark, a daughter of King Christian III of Denmark.

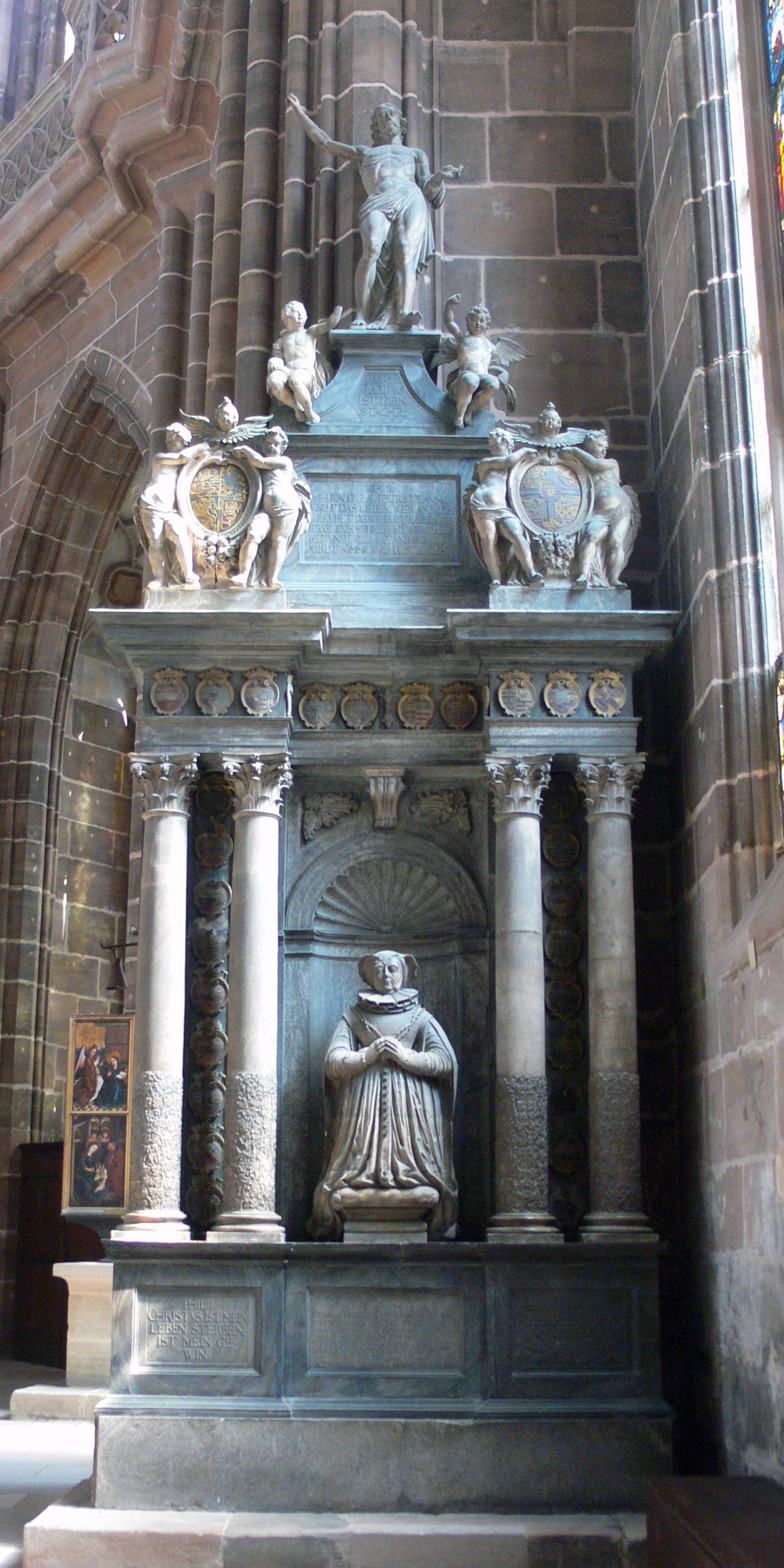
Burial monument in St. Lorenz church, Nuremberg

On 3 May 1579 she married Margrave George Frederick I of Brandenburg-Ansbach-Kulmach (1539–1603) in Dresden. George Frederick was the last of the older line of Frankish Hohenzollerns and was simultaneously Margrave of the Principality of Ansbach and Kulmbach, Silesian duke of the Duchy of Krnov and guardian administrator of the Duchy of Prussia. As such, he was a powerful figure of his time. His first wife, Elisabeth of Brandenburg-Küstrin, had died in 1578, and like his first, George Frederick's second marriage remained childless, which is why his inheritance needed to be regulated by the House Treaty of Gera. Sophie's childlessness motivated her husband to increased interest in the policy of the wider House of Hohenzollern.

After her husband died in 1604, Sophie returned to her birth family. She survived her husband by 36 years. Sophie often stayed in Nuremberg with her sisters Clara, Countess of Schwarzburg, and Sibylle, Duchess of Brunswick-Dannenberg. She died in Nuremberg in 1639 and was buried in the St. Lorenz Church there.

The Renaissance portal of Wülzburg Castle shows George Frederick's coat of arms next to Sophie's.

Sophie of Brunswick-Lüneburg House of Welf Born: 30 October 1563 Died: 14 January 1639
German nobility
Vacant Title last held by Elisabeth of Brandenburg-Küstrin	Margravine of Brandenburg-Ansbach; 3 May 1579 - 25 April 1603	Vacant Title next held by Sophie of Solms-Laubach
Vacant Title last held by Elisabeth of Brandenburg-Küstrin	Margravine of Brandenburg-Kulmbach; 3 May 1579 - 25 April 1603	Title changed Christian of Brandenburg, heir to the margraviate of Brandenburg-Kulmbach, moved its seat to Bayreuth in 1604 to create Brandenburg-Bayreuth
