= George Frederick, Margrave of Brandenburg-Ansbach =

George Frederick
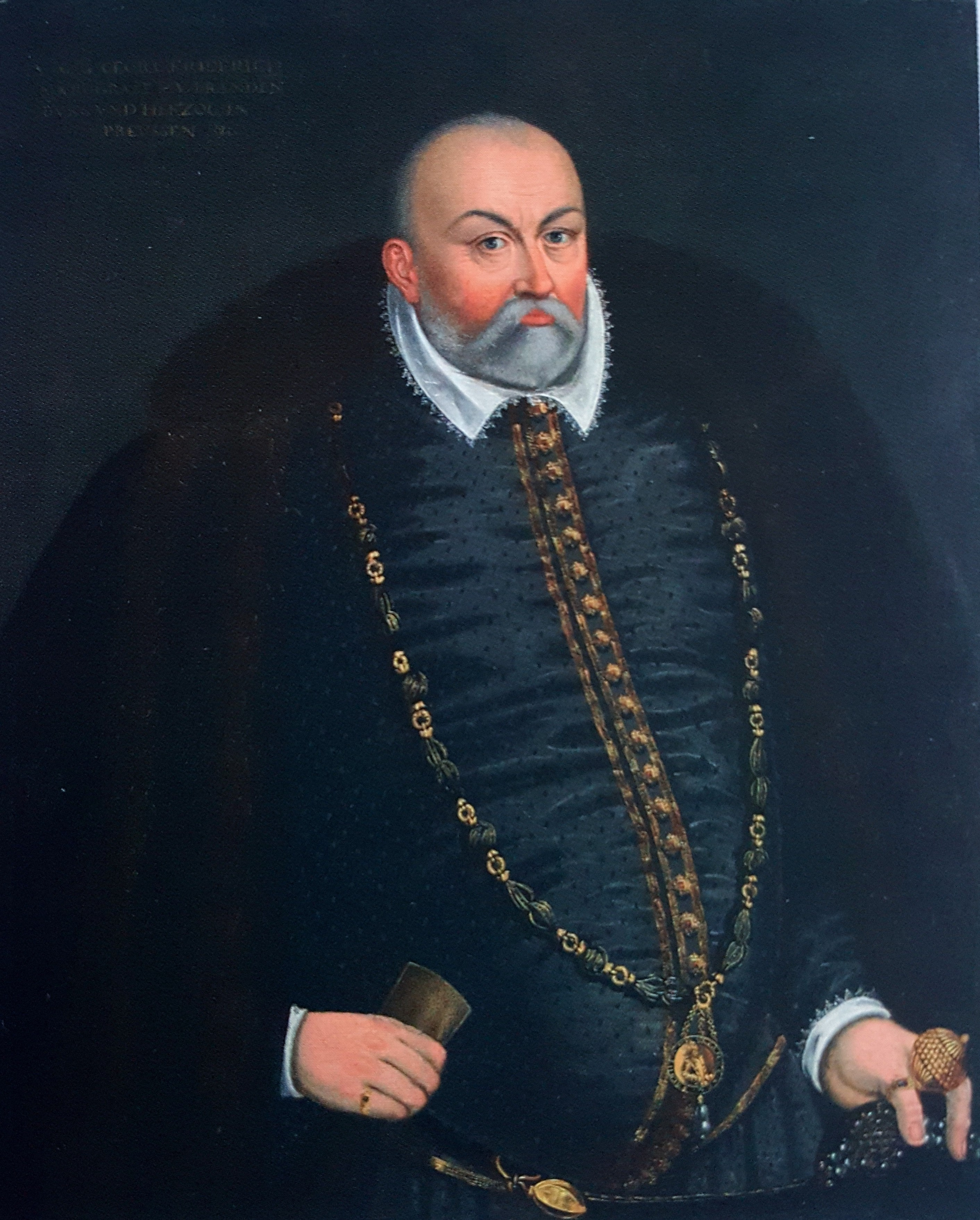
- George Frederick, c. 1601

Margrave of Brandenburg-Ansbach
- Reign: 1543–1603
- Predecessor: George
- Successor: Joachim Ernst

Margrave of Brandenburg-Kulmbach
- Reign: 1553–1603
- Predecessor: Albert Alcibiades
- Successor: Christian
- Born: 5 April 1539; Ansbach
- Died: 25 April 1603 (aged 64); Ansbach
- Spouses: Elisabeth of Brandenburg-Küstrin; Sophie of Brunswick-Lüneburg
- House: House of Hohenzollern
- Father: George, Margrave of Brandenburg-Ansbach
- Mother: Emilie of Saxony

George Frederick of Brandenburg-Ansbach (German: Georg Friedrich der Ältere; 5 April 1539 in Ansbach – 25 April 1603) was Margrave of Ansbach and Bayreuth, as well as Regent of Prussia. He was the son of George, Margrave of Brandenburg-Ansbach and a member of the House of Hohenzollern. He married firstly, in 1559, Elisabeth of Brandenburg-Küstrin (29 August 1540 – 8 March 1578). He married secondly, in 1579, Sophie of Brunswick-Lüneburg (30 October 1563 – 1639), daughter of William of Brunswick-Lüneburg and Dorothea of Denmark.

George Frederick reigned in his native Ansbach, Franconia and Jägerndorf, Upper Silesia since 1556 and, after the death of his cousin Albert Alcibiades in 1557, also in Kulmbach. He took over the administration of the Duchy of Prussia in 1577, when the then-reigning Duke Albert Frederick became ill.

He was the last of the old Franconia line of the House of Hohenzollern. Upon his death Ansbach and Kulmbach were inherited by younger princes of the Brandenburg line according to the House Treaty of Gera of 1598.

George Frederick rebuilt the palace and fortress of Plassenburg, which had been destroyed in the Second Margrave War (1552–1554). It became one of the most impressive residences of the Renaissance in Germany. He also built the fortress of Wülzburg and the old palace in Bayreuth.

During his reign between 1557 and 1603 in the Franconian territories of the Hohenzollern (Brandenburg-Ansbach and Brandenburg-Kulmbach) he kept peace, rebuilt cities and castles, founded several schools and a university.

== Ancestors ==
Ancestors of George Frederick, Margrave of Brandenburg-Ansbach

8. Albrecht III Achilles, Elector of Brandenburg
4. Frederick I, Margrave of Brandenburg-Ansbach
9. Anna of Saxony
2. George, Margrave of Brandenburg-Ansbach
10. Casimir IV Jagiellon
5. Sophia of Poland
11. Elisabeth of Austria
1. George Frederick, Margrave of Brandenburg-Ansbach
12. Albert III, Duke of Saxony
6. Henry IV of Saxony
13. Sidonie of Poděbrady
3. Emilie of Saxony
14. Magnus II, Duke of Mecklenburg
7. Catherine of Mecklenburg
15. Sophie of Pomerania

George Frederick, Margrave of Brandenburg-Ansbach House of Hohenzollern Born: 5 April 1539 Died: 25 April 1603
Regnal titles
Preceded by George	Margrave of Brandenburg-Ansbach; 1543–1603	Succeeded by Joachim Ernst
Preceded by Albert Alcibiades	Margrave of Brandenburg-Kulmbach; 1553–1603	Succeeded by Christian
