= Friederike Charlotte of Hesse-Darmstadt =

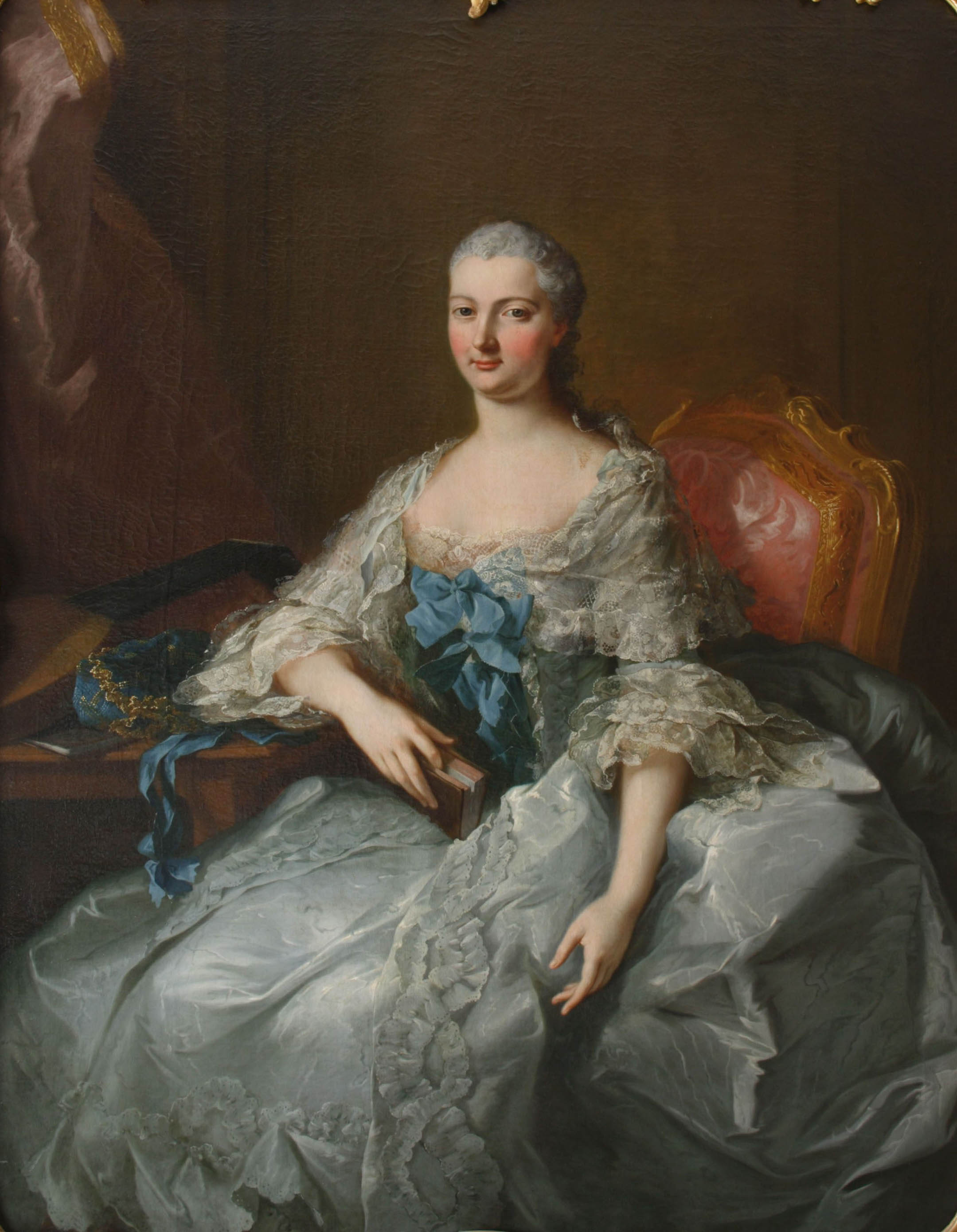
- Portrait by Johann Heinrich Tischbein, c. 1750-1755
- Born: 8 September 1698; Darmstadt
- Died: 22 March 1777 (aged 78); Darmstadt
- Spouse: Maximilian of Hesse-Kassel (m. 1720; died 1753)
- Issue: Prince Karl; Princess Ulrike Friederike Wilhelmine, Duchess of Oldenburg; Princess Christine Charlotte; Princess Maria; Princess Wilhelmina, Princess Henry of Prussia; Princess Elisabetha; Caroline, Princess of Anhalt-Zerbst
- House: Hesse-Darmstadt
- Father: Ernest Louis, Landgrave of Hesse-Darmstadt
- Mother: Princess Dorothea Charlotte of Brandenburg-Ansbach

Friederike Charlotte of Hessen-Darmstadt (8 September 1698 Darmstadt – 22 March 1777, Darmstadt) was a princess of Hesse-Darmstadt and through her marriage a princess of Hesse-Kassel.

== Life ==
She was a daughter of Ernest Louis, Landgrave of Hesse-Darmstadt (1667–1739) and his wife Dorothea Charlotte (1661–1705), daughter of Albrecht II, Margrave of Brandenburg-Ansbach. On 6 October 1720 she became engaged to Maximilian of Hesse-Kassel (1689–1753), marrying him on 28 November 1720 in Darmstadt.

== Marriage and issue ==
They had eight children:

1. Karl (30 September 1721 in Kassel - 23 November 1722 in Kassel)
2. Ulrike Friederike Wilhelmine (31 October 1722 in Kassel - 28 February 1787 in Eutin) ∞ 1752 Frederick August I, Duke of Oldenburg
3. Christine Charlotte (11 February 1725 in Kassel - 4 June 1782 in Kassel), from 17 April 1765 canoness of Herford Abbey, from 12 July 1766 coadjutor abbess of Herford
4. Maria (25 February 1726 in Kassel - 14 March 1727 in Kassel)
5. Wilhelmina (1726–1808) ∞ 1752 Prince Henry of Prussia
6. A still-born child (born and died October 1729 in Kassel)
7. Elisabetha Sophia Louisa (10 November 1730 in Kassel - 4 February 1731 in Kassel)
8. Caroline Wilhelmina Sophia (10 May 1732 in Kassel - 22 May 1759 in Zerbst) ∞ 1753 Frederick Augustus, Prince of Anhalt-Zerbst
