= Princess Christine Charlotte of Hesse-Kassel =

German princess and Calvinist abbess (1725–1782)

Christine Charlotte
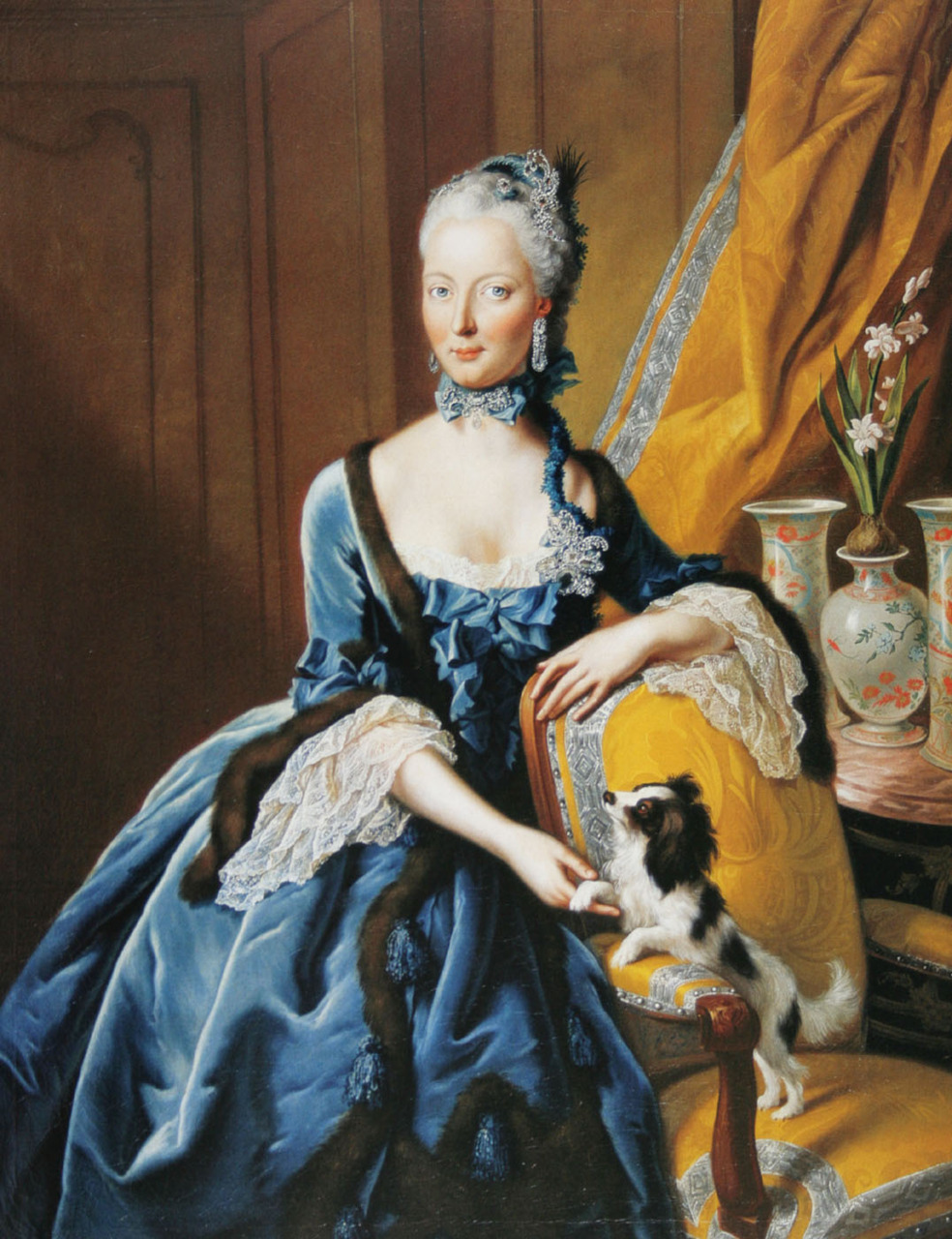
- Portrait of Princess Christina Charlotte from 1754 by Johann Heinrich Tischbein

Princess-Abbess Coadjutor of Herford Abbey
- Reign: 1766 – 1779
- Born: 11 February 1725; Kassel; Landgraviate of Hesse-Kassel; Holy Roman Empire
- Died: 4 June 1782 (aged 57); Kassel; Landgraviate of Hesse-Kassel; Holy Roman Empire
- House: Hesse-Kassel
- Father: Maximilian of Hesse-Kassel
- Mother: Friederike Charlotte of Hesse-Darmstadt

Princess Christine Charlotte of Hesse-Kassel (11 February 1725 – 4 June 1782) was a Hessian princess who lived as a secular canoness before becoming a coadjutor princess-abbess of Herford Abbey.

== Biography ==
Princess Christina Charlotte of Hesse-Kassel was born in Kassel on 11 February 1725 to Prince Maximilian of Hesse-Kassel and Princess Friederike Charlotte of Hesse-Darmstadt. She was a sister of Caroline, Princess of Anhalt-Zerbst; Princess Henry of Prussia; and Princess Ulrike, Duchess of Oldenburg. Christina Charlotte was a granddaughter of Charles I, Landgrave of Hesse-Kassel on her father's side and Ernest Louis, Landgrave of Hesse-Darmstadt on her mother's side.

She was painted by Johann Heinrich Tischbein in 1754.

A staunch Calvinist, Christina Charlotte chose a religious life. On 17 April 1765, she became a secular canoness at Herford Abbey, a Lutheran imperial abbey in Saxony. On 12 July 1766, she was appointed coadjutor abbess of Herford, where she ruled alongside Friederike Charlotte of Brandenburg-Schwedt. She resigned from her position in 1779.

Christina Charlotte died on 4 June 1782 in Kassel.
