= Frederick of Solms-Rödelheim =

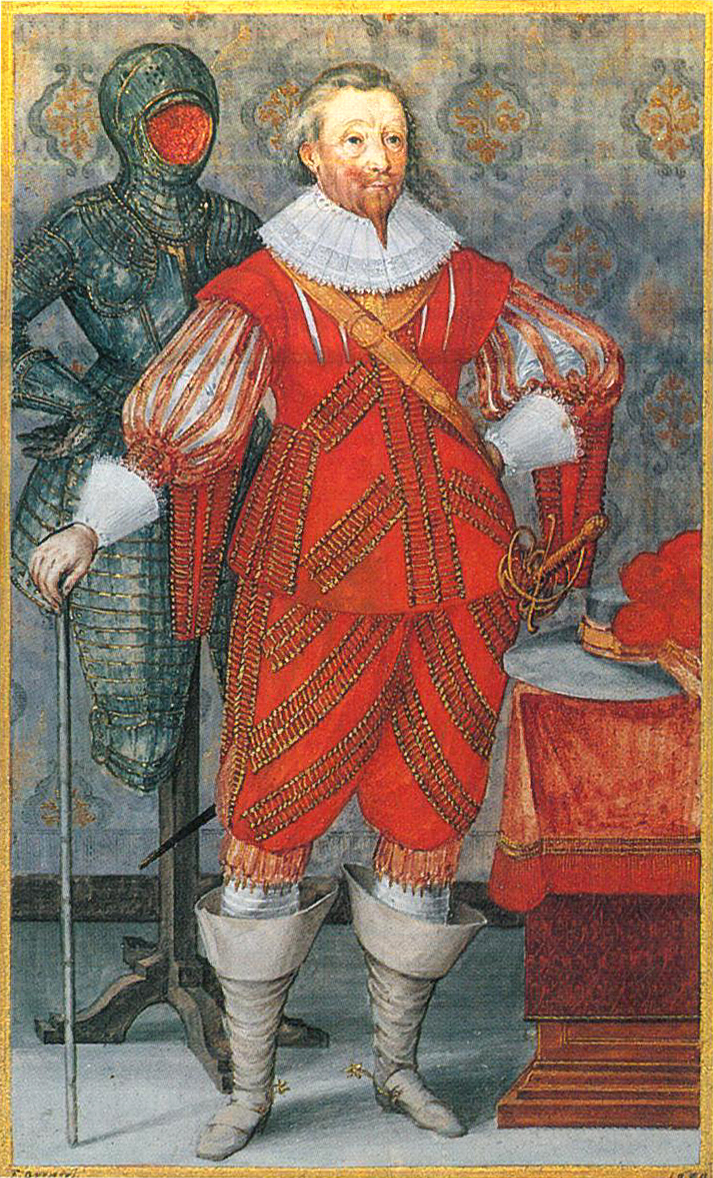
- Born: 30 November 1574
- Died: 1649 (aged 74–75)
- Father: Count John George I of Solms
- Mother: Margarethe of Schönburg-Glauchau

Count Frederick of Solms-Rödelheim (30 November 1574 – 1649) was an imperial chamberlain, war councillor and colonel in the period of the Thirty Years' War.

== Early life ==
Frederick was born as the son of Count Johann Georg I of Solms-Laubach (1547-1600) and his wife, Margarethe of Schönburg-Glauchau (1554–1606).

== Biography ==
When his father's inheritance was divided in 1607, he received the districts of Rödelheim, Pletenheim and Assenheim. His part of the County of Solms was named Solms-Rödelheim, after the first of these.

He became a professional officer. On those days, officers were sometimes operating as a mercenary leader on behalf of princes or cities, or on their own account. He is first mentioned as a participant in the Battle of Nieuwpoort on 2 July 1600 on the Dutch side under Maurice of Orange, who won here against the Spanish under Archduke Albert VII of Austria.

In 1608, he was employed by several Hanseatic cities and his repsonisbilities included overseeing the Dutch military architect Johan van Valckenburgh, who was employed by the same cities. In 1610 he became governor of the city Düren in the Duchy of Jülich. He conquered the town of Schleiden, Kalkofen Castle and Brede Castle. In 1615, he commanded troops provided by the Hanseatic League to the city Brunswick, to help them in their struggle against Duke Frederick Ulrich and on 14 October 1615, he broke the siege around the city of Brunswick.

After the death of the Margrave Joachim Ernst of Brandenburg-Ansbach, he supported the margrave's widow Sophie of Solms-Laubach in the regency, until her son Frederick came of age. After Frederick III's death, he continued so support Sophie in the regency until her second son Albrecht came of age on 26 May 1639.

== Personal life ==
In 1618, Friedrich married Baroness Anna Maria von Geroldseck und Sultz (1593-1649), daughter of Baron Jacon von Geroldseck und Sultz auf Hohengeroldseck (1565-1634) and his first wife, Baroness Barbara von Rappoltstein (1566-1621). They didn't have children. After becoming a widow, Anna Maria married Frederick V, Margrave of Baden-Durlach.
