= Princess Ulrike Friederike Wilhelmine of Hesse-Kassel =

Princess Ulrike Friederike Wilhelmine
- Countess/Duchess of Oldenburg
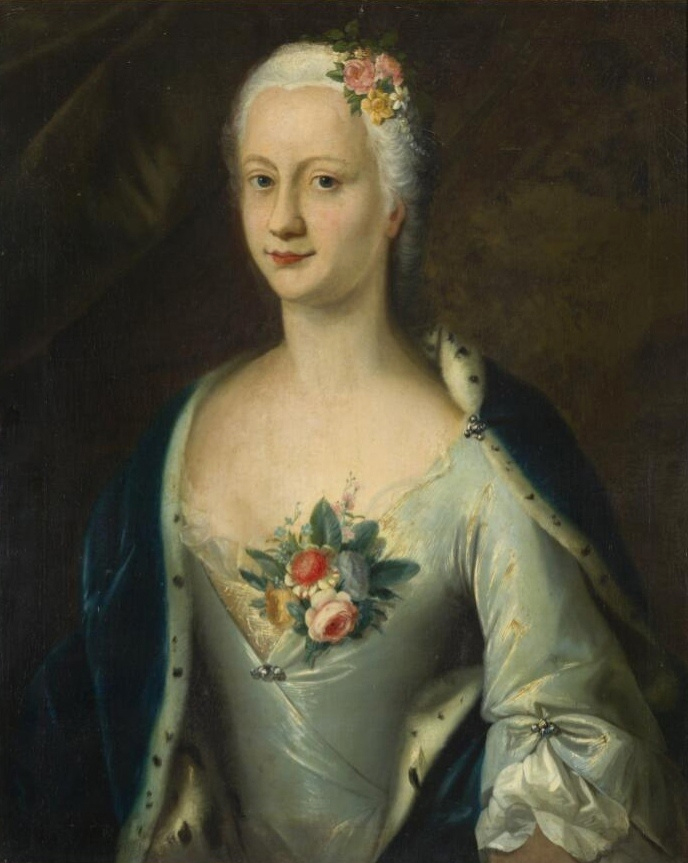
- by Johann Valentin Tischbein
- Born: 31 October 1722; Kassel
- Died: 28 February 1787 (aged 64); Eutin
- Spouse: Frederick Augustus I, Duke of Oldenburg
- Issue: Wilhelm, Duke of Oldenburg; Princess Luise; Hedvig Elisabeth Charlotte, Queen of Sweden and Norway
Names
- German: Ulrike Friederike Wilhelmine
- House: Hesse-Kassel
- Father: Landgrave Maximilian of Hesse-Kassel
- Mother: Landgravine Friederike Charlotte of Hesse-Darmstadt

Princess Ulrike Friederike Wilhelmine of Hesse-Kassel (German: Ulrike Friederike Wilhelmine Prinzessin von Hessen-Kassel (31 October 1722, Kassel; 28 February 1787, Eutin) was a member of the House of Hesse-Kassel by birth, and of the House of Holstein-Gottorp through her marriage to Frederick Augustus I, Duke of Oldenburg. Ulrike was the Duchess consort of Oldenburg from 1774 until her husband's death on 6 July 1785.

== Marriage and issue ==
Ulrike married Prince Frederick Augustus of Holstein-Gottorp, son of Christian August, Duke of Holstein-Gottorp and his wife Margravine Albertine Friederike of Baden-Durlach, on 21 November 1752 in Kassel. Ulrike and Frederick Augustus had three children:

- Peter Friedrich Wilhelm, Duke of Oldenburg (born 3 January 1754)
- Luise of Holstein-Gottorp-Oldenburg (born 2 October 1756, died 1759)
- Hedwig Elisabeth Charlotte of Holstein-Gottorp-Oldenburg (born 22 March 1759)

== Ancestry ==
Ancestors of Princess Ulrike Friederike Wilhelmine of Hesse-Kassel

8. William VI, Landgrave of Hesse-Kassel
4. Charles I, Landgrave of Hesse-Kassel
9. Margravine Hedwig Sophie of Brandenburg
2. Maximilian of Hesse-Kassel
10. Jacob Kettler, Duke of Courland
5. Maria Amalia of Courland
11. Margravine Louise Charlotte of Brandenburg
1. Princess Ulrike Friederike Wilhelmine of Hesse-Kassel
12. Louis VI, Landgrave of Hesse-Darmstadt
6. Ernest Louis, Landgrave of Hesse-Darmstadt
13. Elisabeth Dorothea of Saxe-Gotha-Altenburg
3. Friederike Charlotte of Hesse-Darmstadt
14. Albert II, Margrave of Brandenburg-Ansbach
7. Dorothea Charlotte of Brandenburg-Ansbach
15. Sophia Margaret of Oettingen-Oettingen

Princess Ulrike Friederike Wilhelmine of Hesse-Kassel House of Hesse-Kassel Cadet branch of the House of Hesse Born: 31 October 1722 Died: 28 February 1787
Royal titles
Preceded by Wilhelmina of Hesse-Darmstadt	Countess consort of Oldenburg; 1773	Succeeded by None; County elevated to Duchy
Preceded by None (new creation)	Duchess consort of Oldenburg; 1774-1785	Succeeded by Cecilia of Sweden as Grand duchess
