= Prince Francis Ernest of Hesse-Darmstadt =

Francis Ernest of Hesse-Darmstadt
- Born: 25 January 1695; Gießen
- Died: 8 January 1716 (aged 20); Darmstadt
- Father: Ernest Louis, Landgrave of Hesse-Darmstadt
- Mother: Dorothea Charlotte of Brandenburg-Ansbach

Francis Ernest of Hesse-Darmstadt (born 25 January 1695 in Gießen; died: 8 January 1716 in Darmstadt) was a German nobleman.

He was the third son of Count Landgrave Ernest Louis of Hesse-Darmstadt (1667–1739) from his marriage to Dorothea Charlotte (1661–1705), daughter of the Margrave Albert of Brandenburg-Ansbach.

He replaced his brother Charles William of Hesse-Darmstadt as Colonel of the Hesse-Darmstadt Kreis Regiment when Charles William died during the War of Spanish Succession.
