= Christine Charlotte =

Christine Charlotte may refer to:

- Christine Charlotte of Württemberg (1645–1699), princess consort of East Frisia by her marriage to George Christian, Prince of East Frisia
- Christine Charlotte of Solms-Braunfels (1690–1771), regent of Hesse-Homburg during the minority of her son, 1727–1746
- Princess Christine Charlotte of Hesse-Kassel (1725–1782)
- Christiane Charlotte of Württemberg-Winnental (1694–1729), German princess and regent
