= Ernest Louis =

Ernest Louis may refer to:

- Ernest Louis, Grand Duke of Hesse (1868–1937)
- Ernest Louis, Landgrave of Hesse-Darmstadt (1667–1739)
