= Maria Theresia Isabella von Blumenthal =

German court official

Maria Theresia Isabella von Blumenthal (15.11.1712 in Namur – 25.04.1782 in Berlin), was a German court official. Daughter of Charles-François Count d’Harscamp and Marie-Isabelle Countess d’Argenteau. On 18 February 1743 she married Heinrich von Blumenthal, born at Horst on 5th September 1716, son of the Minister of State Ludwig von Blumenthal, killed at the Battle of Ostritz on 31st December 1756, as Major and commander of the 2nd Battalion of Prince Heinrich's Regiment. They had no children.

She was the lady-in-waiting to Princess Wilhelmina of Hesse-Kassel. She became known as a philanthropist in contemporary Prussia, and was especially generous to Catholics in Berlin. She was a friend of the diarist Sophie von Voss, who mentions her often in her writings.
