= Princess Caroline Wilhelmina Sophia of Hesse-Kassel =

German princess

Princess Caroline
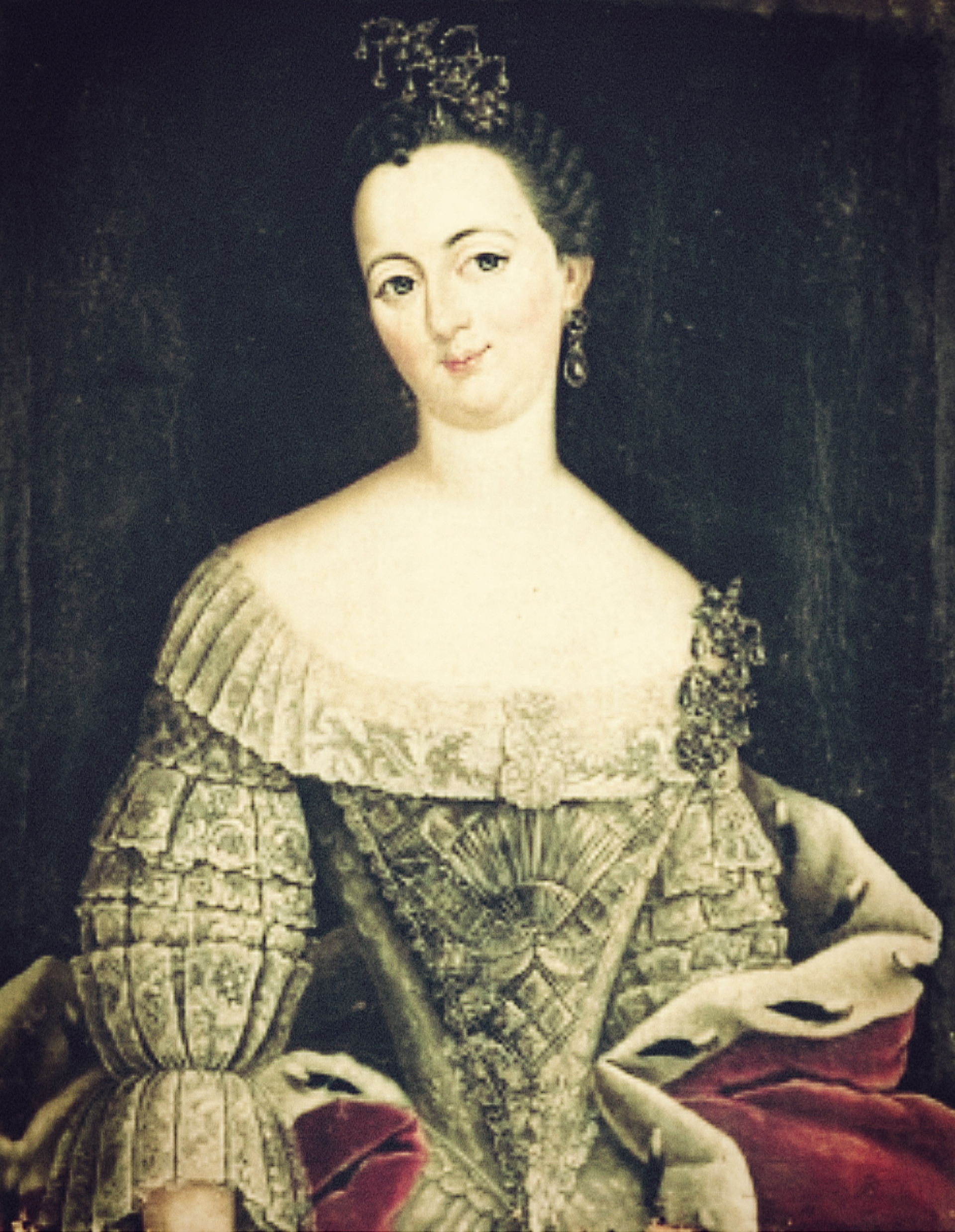

Princess consort of Anhalt-Zerbst
- Tenure: 17 November 1753 – 22 May 1759
- Born: 10 May 1732
- Died: 22 May 1759 (aged 27)
- Spouse: Frederick Augustus, Prince of Anhalt-Zerbst
- Caroline Wilhelmina Sophia
- House: Hesse-Kassel
- Father: Maximilian of Hesse-Kassel
- Mother: Friederike Charlotte of Hesse-Darmstadt

Caroline, Princess of Anhalt-Zerbst (née Princess Caroline Wilhelmina Sophia of Hesse-Kassel; 10 May 1732 – 22 May 1759) was the first wife and consort of Frederick Augustus, Prince of Anhalt-Zerbst.

== Biography ==
Princess Caroline Wilhelmina Sophia of Hesse-Kassel was born on 10 May 1732 to Prince Maximilian of Hesse-Kassel and Friederike Charlotte of Hesse-Darmstadt. Her paternal grandparents were Charles I, Landgrave of Hesse-Kassel and Maria Amalia of Courland. Her maternal grandparents were Ernest Louis, Landgrave of Hesse-Darmstadt and Princess Dorothea Charlotte of Brandenburg-Ansbach.

On 17 November 1753 she married Frederick Augustus, Prince of Anhalt-Zerbst in Zerbst, becoming the consort of the Principality of Anhalt-Zerbst. The marriage was childless.

She died on 22 May 1759.
