= Maximilian of Hesse-Kassel =

Prince Maximilian
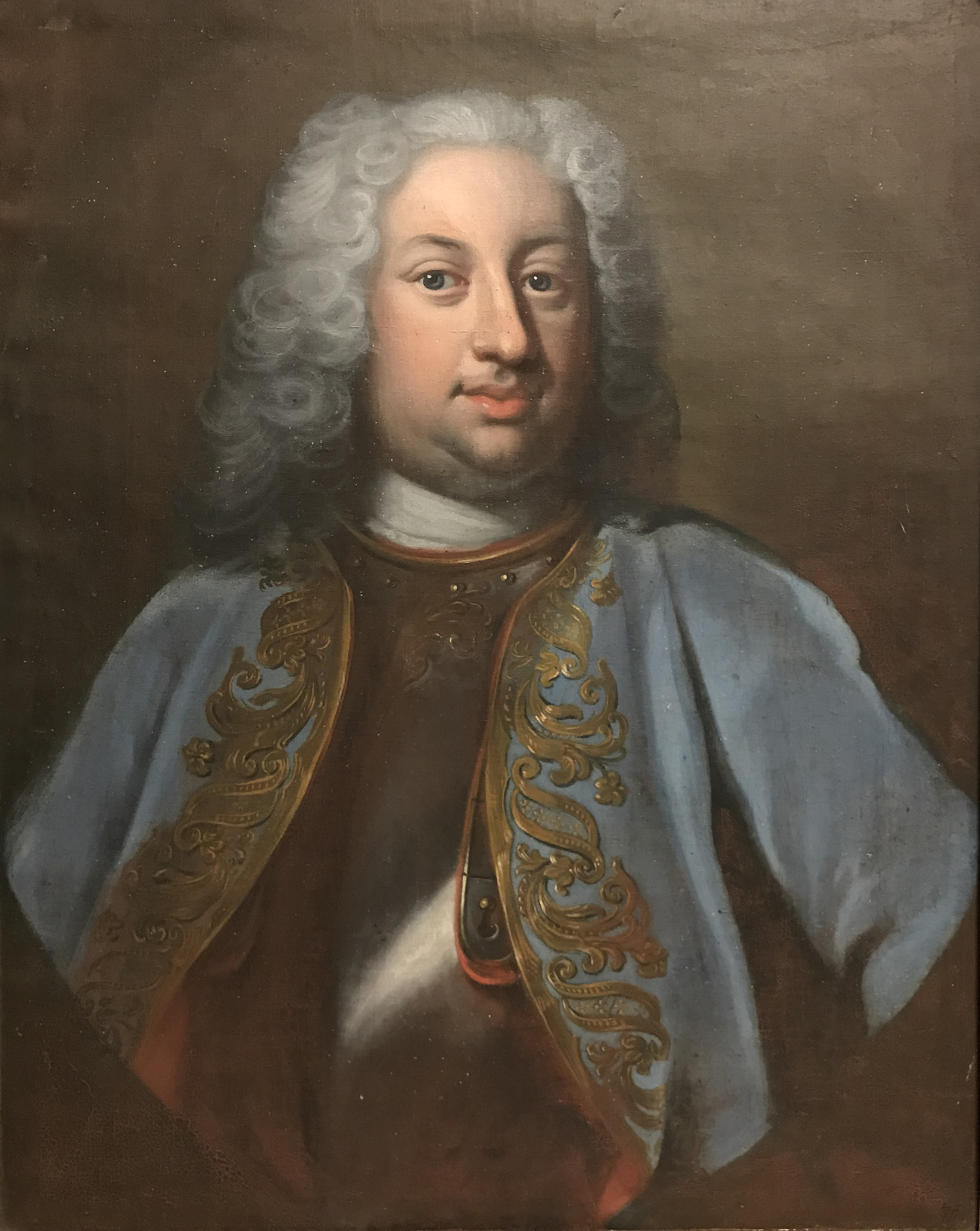
- Portrait by Georg Engelhard Schröder
- Born: 28 May 1689
- Died: 8 May 1753 (aged 63)
- Spouse: Friederike Charlotte of Hesse-Darmstadt (m. 1720)
- Issue details…: Prince Karl; Ulrike Friederike Wilhelmine, Duchess of Oldenburg; Princess Christine Charlotte; Princess Maria; Princess Wilhelmina, Princess Henry of Prussia; Princess Elisabetha; Princess Caroline, Princess of Anhalt-Zerbst
- House: Hesse-Kassel
- Father: Charles I, Landgrave of Hesse-Kassel
- Mother: Amalia of Kurland

Maximilian of Hesse-Kassel (28 May 1689 – 8 May 1753) was a prince of Hesse-Kassel and a Generalfeldzeugmeister, Generalfeldmarschall and finally Reichsgeneralfeldmarschall in the army of the Holy Roman Empire.

== Life ==
Maximilian was the ninth son of Charles I, Landgrave of Hesse-Kassel (1654–1730), and his wife, Marie Amalia (1653–1711), daughter of Jacob Kettler, Duke of Kurland.

In 1720, he married Friederike Charlotte of Hesse-Darmstadt (1698–1777), the daughter of Ernest Louis, Landgrave of Hesse-Darmstadt. The marriage was meant to symbolise the new harmony between Hesse-Kassel and Hesse-Darmstadt, but was complicated by the two families' annoyance over his lavish lifestyle. In 1723, his father gave Maximilian the domain of Jesberg, which included the Richerode estate. In Jesberg, Maximilian built the baroque Schloss Jesberg and in nearby woodland built the 'Prinzessingarten' for his daughters. He was a passionate musician, maintaining a separate court-orchestra of his own, but this plunged him into debt.

== Marriage and issue ==
He had eight children:

1. Prince Karl of Hesse-Kassel (30 September 1721 – 23 November 1722)
2. Princess Ulrike Friederike Wilhelmine of Hesse-Kassel (31 October 1722 – 28 February 1787); married in 1752 Frederick August I, Duke of Oldenburg.
3. Princess Christine Charlotte of Hesse-Kassel (11 February 1725 – 4 June 1782), from 17 April 1765 canoness of Herford Abbey, from 12 July 1766 coadjutor abbess of Herford.
4. Princess Maria of Hesse-Kassel (25 February 1726 – 14 March 1727)
5. Princess Wilhelmina of Hesse-Kassel (1726–1808); married in 1752 Prince Henry of Prussia, younger brother of Frederick the Great.
6. A stillborn child (born and died October 1729)
7. Princess Elisabetha Sophia Louisa of Hesse-Kassel (10 November 1730 – 4 February 1731)
8. Princess Caroline Wilhelmina Sophia of Hesse-Kassel (10 May 1732 – 22 May 1759 in Zerbst); married in 1753 Frederick Augustus, Prince of Anhalt-Zerbst, younger brother of Catherine the Great.

== Bibliography ==
- Eckhardt G. Franz, Das Haus Hessen, Kohlhammer Verlag, 2005, S. 93. ISBN 3-17-018919-0, ISBN 978-3-17-018919-5
- Hans Philippi, Die Landgrafschaft Hessen-Kassel 1648–1806 = Veröffentlichungen der Historischen Kommission für Hessen 46 = Kleine Schriften 8, Marburg 2007, S. 45f. ISBN 978-3-7708-1303-2
