= Princess Dorothea Charlotte of Brandenburg-Ansbach =

Dorothea Charlotte of Brandenburg-Ansbach
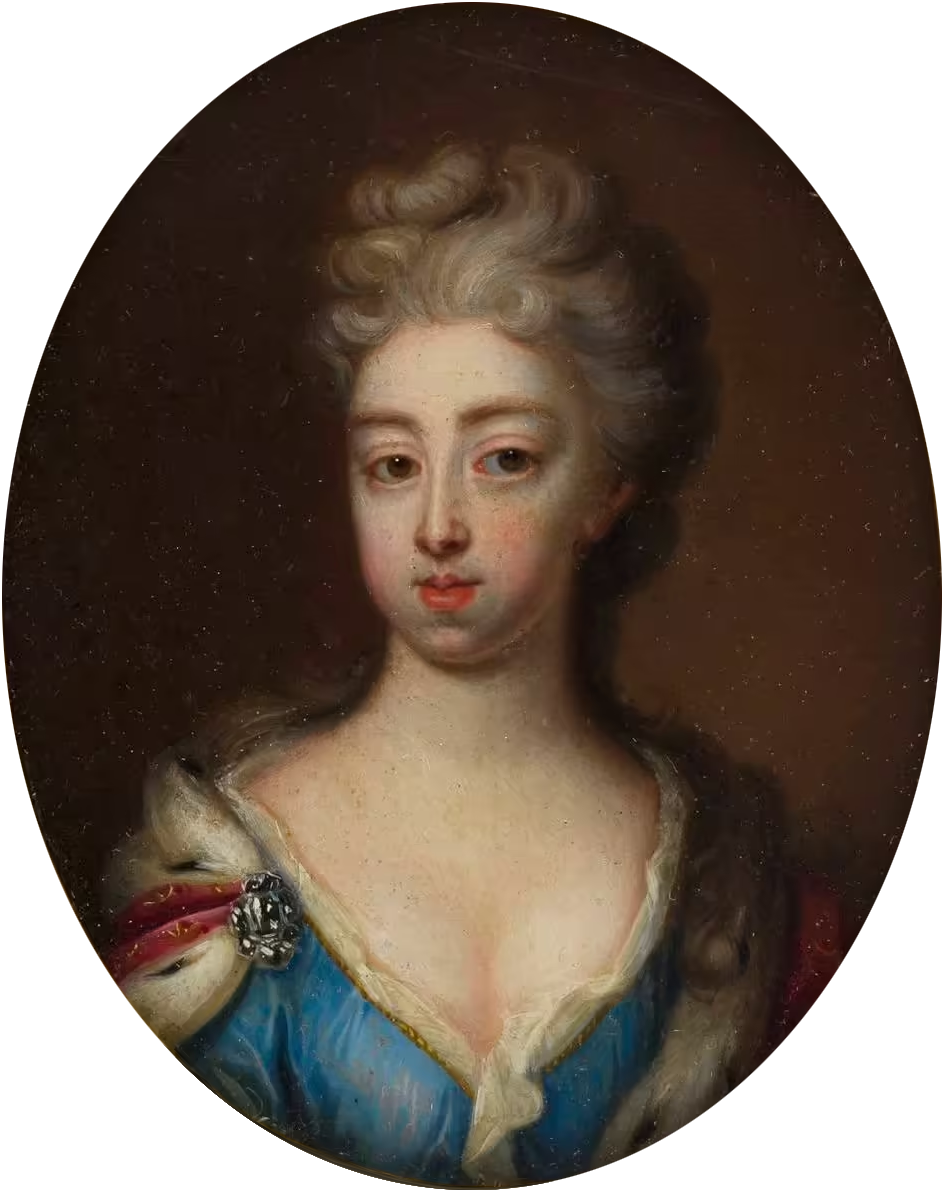

Landgravine consort of Hesse-Darmstadt
- Tenure: 1 December 1687 - 15 November 1705
- Born: 28 November 1661; Ansbach
- Died: 15 November 1705 (aged 43); Darmstadt
- Burial: City Church, Darmstadt
- Spouse: Ernest Louis, Landgrave of Hesse-Darmstadt (m. 1687)
- Issue: Dorothea Sophie, Countess of Hohenlohe-Öhringen; Louis VIII, Landgrave of Hesse-Darmstadt; Prince Charles William; Prince Francis Ernest; Friederike Charlotte, Princess Maximilian of Hesse-Kassel
- House: Hohenzollern
- Father: Albert of Brandenburg-Ansbach
- Mother: Sophia Margaret of Oettingen-Oettingen

Dorothea Charlotte of Brandenburg-Ansbach (28 November 1661 – 15 November 1705) was a German noblewoman, and by her marriage to Ernest Louis, Landgravine consort of Hesse-Darmstadt. The marriage took place on 1 December 1687.

== Life ==
Born into the Brandenburg-Ansbach line of the House of Hohenzollern, Dorothea Charlotte was the seventh child and elder daughter of Albert II, Margrave of Brandenburg-Ansbach and Countess Sophia Margaret of Oettingen-Oettingen, daughter of Joachim Ernest of Oettingen-Oettingen (1612-1659) and Countess Anna Sibilla von Solms-Sonnenwalde.

On 1 December 1687 she married Ernest Louis, Landgrave of Hesse-Darmstadt, as his first wife. At the time of their marriage, he was still under the guardianship of his mother, Elisabeth Dorothea of Saxe-Gotha-Altenburg until 1688, when Ernst Louis came of age.

Dorothea Charlotte was a pietist and exerted some influence upon the affairs of state in favour of the pietists in the first years of her marriage. In cooperation with Philipp Jakob Spener, whose patron she became, she promoted pietism at the court and the local University. After her death, Ernest Louis turned against pietism.

== Issue ==
Ernst Louis and Dorothea Charlotte had five surviving children, two sons and three daughters. Their children were:

- Dorothea Sophie (1689–1723)

married in 1710 Count John Frederick of Hohenlohe-Öhringen (1683–1765)

- Louis VIII, Landgrave of Hesse-Darmstadt (1691–1768)

married in 1717 Countess Charlotte of Hanau-Lichtenberg (1700–1726)

- Charles William (1693–1707)
- Francis Ernest (1695–1717)
- Friederike Charlotte

married in 1720 Landgrave Maximilian of Hesse-Kassel (1689–1753)

== Death ==
Landgravine Dorothea Charlotte died in 1705, at the age of 44. She was buried hext to her husband in the Stadtkirche in Darmstadt.

== Ancestry ==
Ancestors of Princess Dorothea Charlotte of Brandenburg-Ansbach

8. John George, Elector of Brandenburg
4. Joachim Ernst, Margrave of Brandenburg-Ansbach
9. Elisabeth of Anhalt-Zerbst
2. Albert II, Margrave of Brandenburg-Ansbach
10. John George I, Count of Solms-Laubach
5. Sophie of Solms-Laubach
11. Margarethe of Schönburg-Glauchau
1. Margravine Dorothea Charlotte of Brandenburg-Ansbach
12.Louis Eberhard, Count of Oettingen-Oettingen
6. Joachim Ernst of Oettingen-Oettingen
13. Margaret of Erbach
3. Sophia Margaret of Oettingen-Oettingen
14. Henry William I, Count of Solms-Sonnewalde
7. Anna Sibylle of Solms-Sonnewalde
15. Sophia Dorothea of Mansfeld-Arnstein

Vacant Title last held by Elisabeth Dorothea of Saxe-Gotha-Altenburg	Landgravine consort of Hesse-Darmstadt; 1687–1705	Vacant Title next held by Countess Palatine Caroline of Zweibrücken
