= Johanna Elisabeth Döbricht =

German soprano

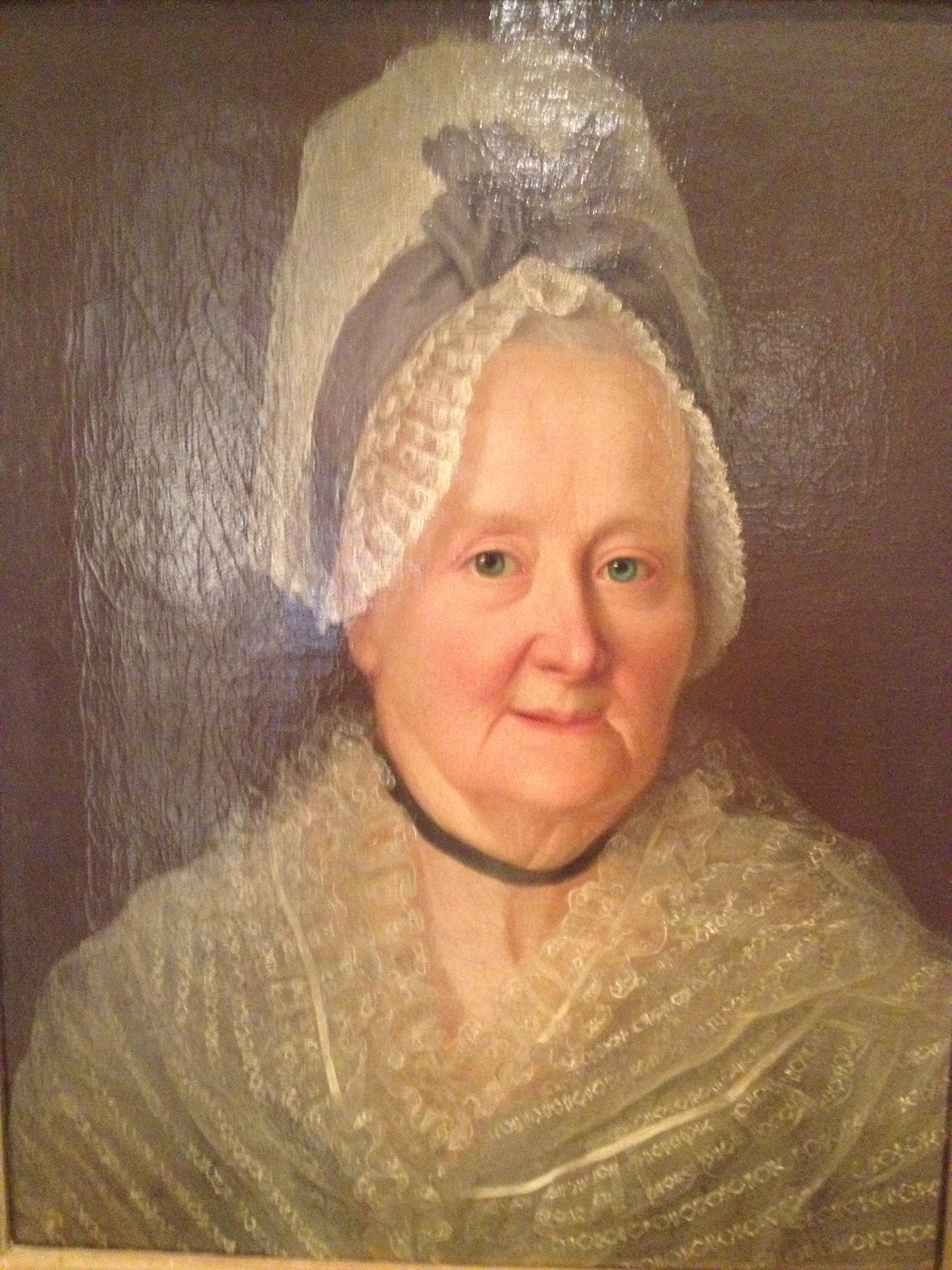
Johanna Elisabeth Döbricht by the painter Johann Christian Fiedler.

Johanna Elisabeth Döbricht, sometimes referred to by her married name Johanna Elisabeth Hesse, (16 September 1692 — 23 February 1786) was a German soprano active during the first half of the 18th century in concerts and operas. Considered by her contemporaries as the finest German female singer of her era, she was referred to as "Die Döbrichtin" by her admirers. Composer Johann Joachim Quantz, wrote that she had a "beautiful, euphonious high register".

== Life and career ==
Born in Weissenfels, Johanna was born into the Döbricht family of musicians. Her father Daniel Döbricht (1650–1694) was an opera singer in the court of the Duke of Saxe-Weissenfels, and the kapellmeister at the Weissenfels Capelle. Her mother, Katharina Elisabeth Grosse, was also a soprano. After initial music training from her parents, she studied with Christoph Alt in Weimar.

In 1708, at the age of 15, Johanna traveled with her sister, the opera singer and court musician Elisabeth Christiane Döbricht, to join the roster of court singers employed by the Duke of Brunswick-Wolfenbüttel. While Johanna only sang for a couple years in this position, her sister remained as a court singer at Brunswick-Wolfenbüttel for the next 29 years and married Brunswick-Wolfenbüttel court violinist Johann Wilhelm Simonetti.

Johanna left Brunswick-Wolfenbüttel to join the roster of resident singers at the Oper am Gänsemarkt in Hamburg, Germany where she had her initial success on the opera stage. She was also engaged as a singer by the Leipzig Opera. On 17 February 1711, she starred in the world premiere of Christoph Graupner's opera Telemach, which was first performed for the opening of newly built Staatstheater Darmstadt. She was hired as a court singer in Darmstadt the following July; remaining there for many years.

Döbricht married composer and gamba player Ernst Christian Hesse (1676–1762) on 6 September 1713. She continued to perform in Döbricht and in concert tours even after she was awarded a pension in 1740.

In her old age Döbricht was depicted on canvas by German portrait painter Johann Christian Fiedler. She died in Darmstadt on 23 February 1786.
