= Prince Charles William of Hesse-Darmstadt =

Prince Charles William
- Born: 17 June 1693; Nidda, Hesse-Darmstadt
- Died: 17 May 1707 (aged 13); Gießen, Hesse-Darmstadt
- House: House of Hesse-Darmstadt
- Father: Ernest Louis, Landgrave of Hesse-Darmstadt
- Mother: Dorothea Charlotte of Brandenburg-Ansbach

Karl Wilhelm of Hesse-Darmstadt (17 June 1693, Nidda - 17 May 1707, Gießen) was a Prince of Hesse-Darmstadt.

== Life ==
Charles William was the second son of Ernest Louis, Landgrave of Hesse-Darmstadt (1667–1739) from his marriage to Dorothea Charlotte (1661–1705), daughter of Albert II, Margrave of Brandenburg-Ansbach.

When Charles William was four years-old, his father appointed him Colonel of the newly created Hesse-Darmstadt Kreis Regiment. Two years later, the education of Charles William was handed over to Johann Konrad Dippel in Gießen, where the Landgrave's family had fled before the advancing French troops.

Karl Wilhelm died at the age of 13, during the War of Spanish Succession. His younger brother Prince Francis Ernest of Hessen-Darmstadt took his place in the Regiment.
