= Ernst Christian Hesse =

German composer

Ernst Christian Hesse (14 April 1676 – 16 May 1762) was a German gambist and composer.

== Biography ==
Born at Großengottern, which was then in the Electorate of Saxony, he attended school in Langensalza and Eisenach. He studied law at Giesen, then viola da gamba in Darmstadt. In 1692, aged 16, he performed for the Landgrave Ernst Ludwig of Hesse-Darmstadt, who engaged him for his court. The landgrave then sent him for further study in Paris, under the two leading composer-performers of the day, Marin Marais and Antoine Forqueray. But Marais and Forqueray were bitter rivals, and Hesse could not study under both – at least, not under the same name. So, he called himself by his real name Hesse for one of the teachers, and "Sachs" for the other. The plan foundered when the two rival teachers chose to show off their star pupils in a public competition, not realising they were the same pupil. Hesse was able to please both masters by playing in their styles in turn, and this led to a rapprochement between them.

Hesse then toured as a virtuoso throughout Europe, becoming friends with Johann Mattheson and George Frideric Handel, and possibly studied under Antonio Vivaldi in Mantua. On Easter Sunday, 8 April 1708, in Rome, it was most likely Hesse who played the demanding viola da gamba solo part at the premiere of Handel's oratorio La resurrezione (HWV 47) under Arcangelo Corelli. He returned to Darmstadt in 1708, where in 1713 he married the soprano Johanna Elisabeth Döbricht, his third wife. He became Kapellmeister in Vienna, staying there till 1719. He was also appointed a war commissar and war councillor ("Secretar der Kriegs- und französischen, auch anderer ausländischen Affairen": Minister of War, French and Foreign Affairs). He returned to Darmstadt, where he died in 1762, aged 86.

Most of his compositions (operas, sonatas, church music) are lost, but an opera and some gamba pieces are extant, and there are some recordings of his music.

== Family ==
His first two wives, Katharina Magdalena Merck and Anna Katharina Merck, half-sisters, were daughters of the royal court apothecary Georg Friedrich Merck (1647–1715). He had 18 (or 20) children by his latter two wives. His son Ludwig Christian Hesse (1716–1772) also became a prominent gambist who worked alongside Carl Philipp Emanuel Bach, who wrote pieces for him. His only other pupil was Johann Christian Hertel.
