= Hesse-Darmstadt Kreis Regiment =

The Hessen-Darmstadt Kreis Regiment ("Kreis" is a military district) was created on 1 April 1697 in Gießen by the Landgraviate of Hesse-Darmstadt. Two companies were transferred from the Schrautenbach Regiment and it later received the 2nd Battalion of the 117th (3rd Grand Ducal) Hessian Infantry Regiment. The Hesse-Darmstadt Kreis Regiment wore white insignia. It was reduced in strength to five companies after the Peace of Ryswick but expanded to eight companies on 1 April 1702 because of the War of Spanish Succession.

- 1701-1714: Participation in the War of Spanish Succession
- 1733-1735: Participation in the War of Polish Succession
- 1747-1749: in Dutch service
- 1756-1763: Participation in the Seven Years' War
- 1790 incorporated as the 2nd Battalion of the regiment "Landgrave"

== Colonels ==
1. 1697-1707: Prince Charles William of Hesse-Darmstadt
2. 1709-1716: Prince Francis Ernest of Hessen-Darmstadt
3. 1716-1735: Count Philip Charles of Erbach-Fürstenau
4. 1738-1782: Prince George William of Hesse-Darmstadt
