= Waltger =

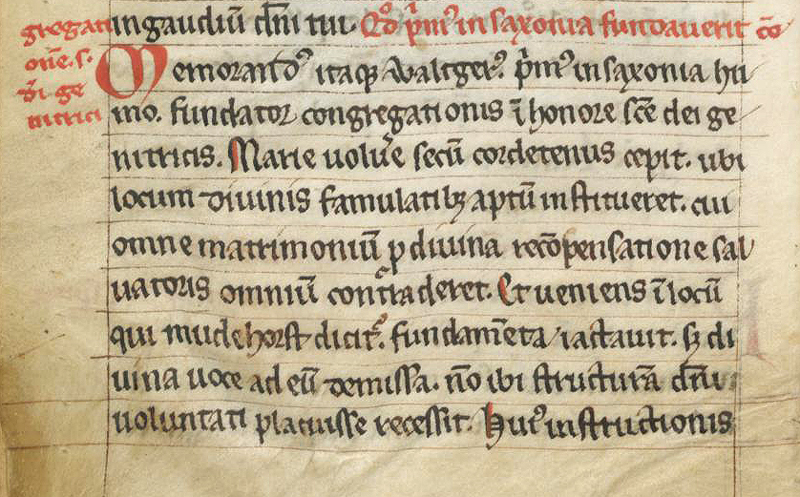
The Vita sancti Waltgeri

Waltger was a Saxon nobleman who founded Herford Abbey in the 830s. In 838, he gave the monastery to the Emperor Louis the Pious, who in turn placed it under the authority of the Benedictine nunnery of Notre-Dame de Soissons.

Waltger is not attested in any contemporary document, but is first mentioned in his hagiography, Vita sancti Waltgeri ("Life of Saint Waltger"), written in the 13th or 14th century by Wigand, a monk of Herford. Although the source is late, it is considered trustworthy in its basic outline. According to the Vita, Waltger's grandfather, Aldolf, converted to Christianity during the reign of Charlemagne. His father's name was Dedda. The Vita includes a letter supposedly written by Pope Gregory III to Saint Boniface, the relevance of which to the life of Waltger is unclear and the authenticity of which is disputed.
