= Sophie of Brandenburg-Ansbach (1614–1646) =

German noblewoman

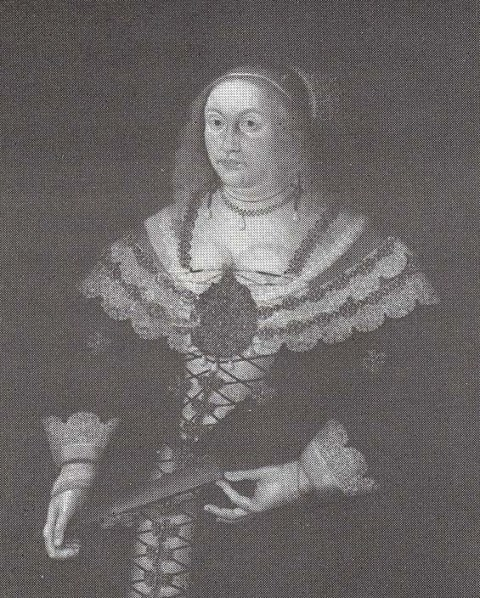
Sophia of Brandenburg-Ansbach

Sophie of Brandenburg-Ansbach (10 June 1614 – 3 December 1646) was a German noblewoman of the house of Brandenburg-Ansbach.

== Life ==
She was the eldest child of Sophie of Solms-Laubach and her husband Joachim Ernst, Margrave of Brandenburg-Ansbach. In Ansbach on 8 December 1641, she married Erdmann August, Hereditary Prince of Brandenburg-Bayreuth - since his father and her father were brothers, they were first cousins. Sophie and Erdmann August had only one child, Christian Ernst (b. Bayreuth, 6 August 1644 - d. Erlangen, 20 May 1712), who became Margrave of Brandenburg-Bayreuth.

== Sources ==
- Theodor Hirsch (1881). "Joachim Ernst, Margrave of Brandenburg-Ansbach" . Allgemeine Deutsche Biographie (in German). Vol. 14. Leipzig: Duncker & Humblot. p. 91.
