= Wilhelm, Duke of Oldenburg =

William I

Duke/Grand Duke of Oldenburg
- Reign: 6 July 1785 – 2 July 1823
- Predecessor: Frederick Augustus I
- Successor: Peter I
- Born: 3 January 1754; Eutin, Prince-bishopric of Lübeck
- Died: 2 July 1823 (aged 69); Schloss Plön, Plön, Duchy of Holstein
Names
- German: Peter Friedrich Wilhelm
- House: House of Holstein-Gottorp
- Father: Frederick August I, Duke of Oldenburg
- Mother: Princess Ulrike Friederike Wilhelmine of Hesse-Kassel

Peter Friedrich Wilhelm, Duke of Oldenburg (3 January 1754 – 2 July 1823) was a ruling Duke of Oldenburg from 1784 to his death.

== Life ==
Wilhelm was born at Eutin Castle, Eutin, the son of Frederick Augustus I, Duke of Oldenburg and Princess Ulrike Friederike Wilhelmine of Hesse-Kassel.

He succeeded his father, Frederick Augustus I, Duke of Oldenburg as the Duke of Oldenburg in 1785.

Due to mental illness, Wilhelm was duke in name only, with his cousin Peter, Prince-Bishop of Lübeck, acting as regent throughout his entire reign. He died at Schloss Plön, Plön.

In October 1799, his sister the Swedish Princess Charlotte, later Queen of Sweden, met him in Lübeck on her journey back to Sweden. She described the meeting between them in her famous journal:

"Here we had arranged for a meeting with my brother. It was a great joy for me to meet him but heart breaking to find him so saddened and in such a difficult position. [...] My cousin the Prince-Bishop of Lübeck visited and stayed for dinner. I do not know his intentions toward my brother but I hope for the best. He is sadly not in good hands and is treated quite badly by his courtiers. In this the Prince-Bishop cannot interfere, as the matter is in the hands of the Russian and Danish courts."

In a letter to her sister-in-law Sophia Albertina of Sweden, she described his condition:

"Sometimes he does appear to be distant and peculiar, but sometimes he speak as wise and sensible as any ordinary person and can even make witty remarks. He has a polite manner but he is entirely as a child, speaks of every subject but normally without any context to it and his sensible moments are temporary. He was very conformable with me and I could make him do anything, but his courtiers claims that he can be quite mean, particularly when he does not get what he wants. Between us, dear sister, I was dissatisfied with his courtiers and the prince bishop, whom I met in Lübeck, was not pleased either. If my brother had been treated differently to begin with, he might have been different than he is now. Now it is too late. The only thing left to us is to make his life as comfortable as possible and hope that he is content."

His title became Grand Duke in 1815, but Wilhelm never used the elevated style. It was not used until 1829 by the son of Wilhelm's cousin and successor, Peter I.

Wilhelm, Duke of Oldenburg House of Holstein-Gottorp Cadet branch of the House of Oldenburg Born: 3 January 1754 Died: 2 July 1823
Regnal titles
Preceded by Frederick Augustus I	Duke of Oldenburg; 6 July 1785 – 2 July 1823	Succeeded by Peter I
