= Johann Christian Fiedler =

German painter

Johann Fiedler
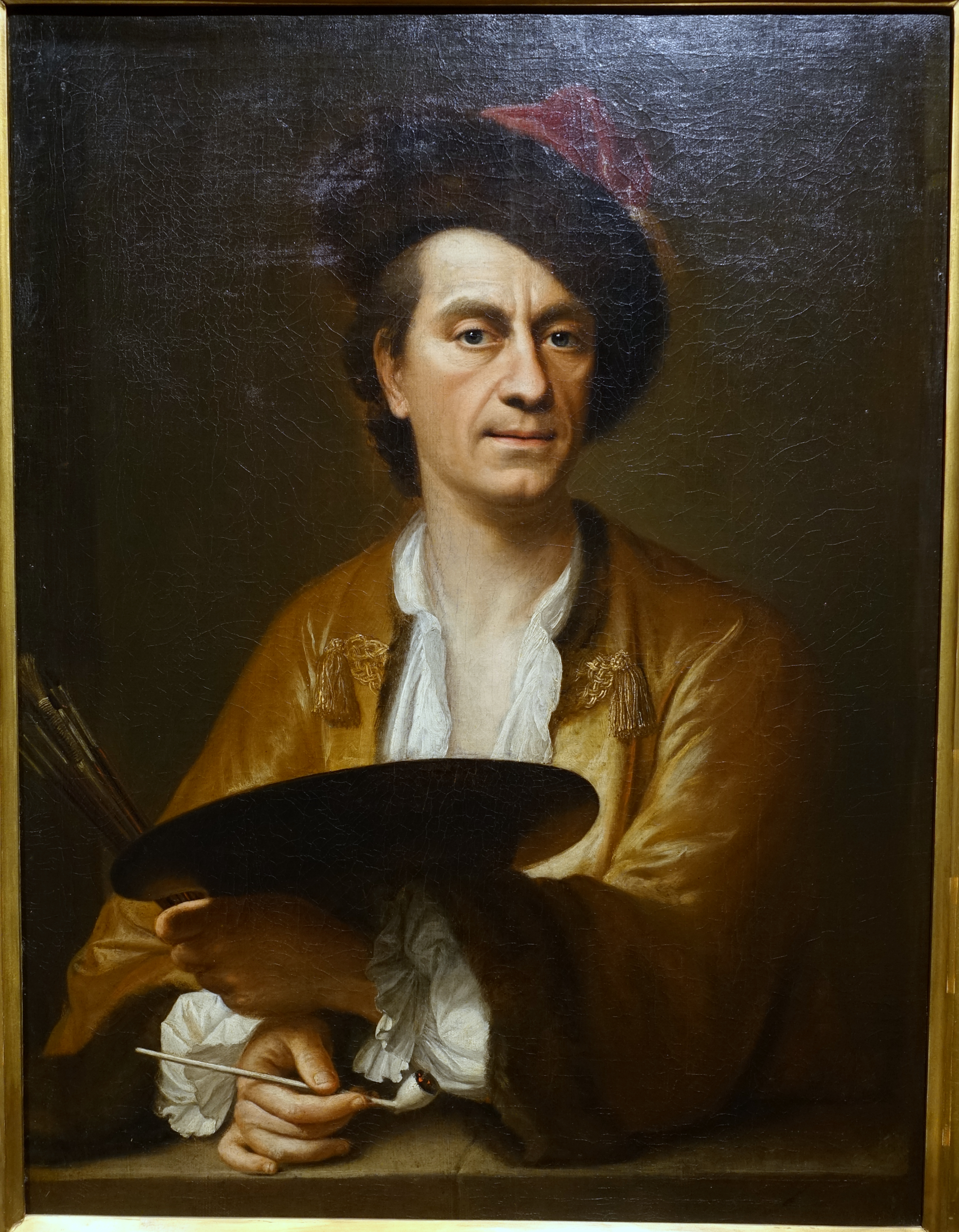
- Self-portrait, c. 1783
- Born: 31 October 1697; Pirna, Saxony
- Died: 5 September 1765 (aged 67); Darmstadt

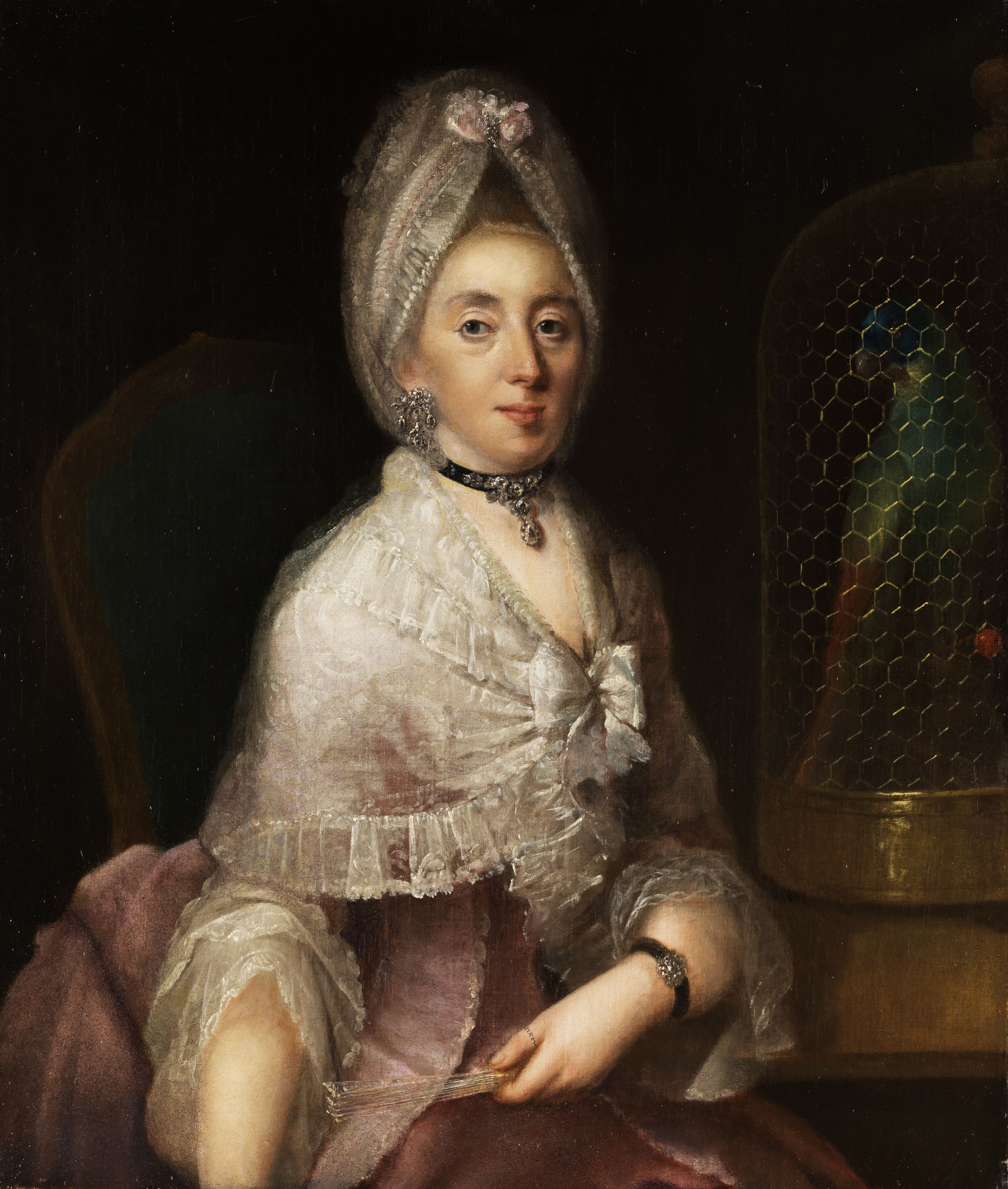
Portrait of a Lady with a Parrot Cage

Johann Christian Fiedler (31 October 1697 – 5 September 1765) was a German portrait painter. Some sources give his year of death as 1768.

== Biography ==
His father was a brewmaster and his mother's family had long served in the city government of Pirna. He graduated from the Lateinschule there then, around 1715, went to Leipzig to study law. As it turned out, he was more interested in art and began painting miniatures that he displayed in 1719 at a fair in Braunschweig. Upon returning to Leipzig, he attempted to teach himself oil painting.

In 1720, with the financial support of Augustus William, Duke of Brunswick-Luneburg, he went to Paris, where he studied with Hyacinthe Rigaud and Nicolas de Largillière. After that, he was supposed to become court painter to the Duke but, while passing through Darmstadt in 1724, Ernest Louis, Landgrave of Hesse-Darmstadt offered him 400 Florins per year if he would remain there.

He accepted the offer, working for Ernst-Louis and his son, Louis VIII until at least 1752 or 1754, although he may have remained until his death. Most of his works were portraits, but he also did still-lifes and some religious scenes.

Sometime during his forties, he began to suffer from lithiasis and gout. He probably died of cachexia and was buried next to the Stadtkirche Darmstadt, with a monument bearing a medallion and a poetic inscription.
