= Sophie of Solms-Laubach =

German regent

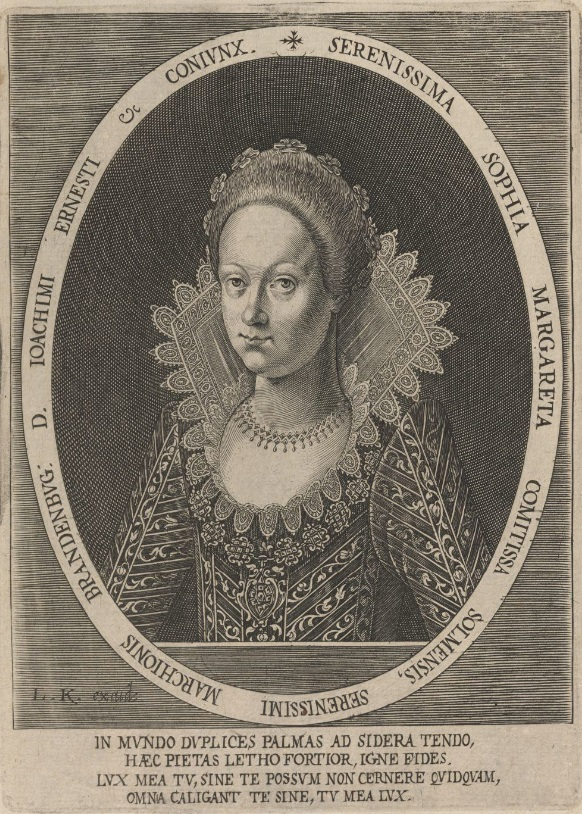
- Engraving by Lucas Kilian
- Born: 15 May 1594; Laubach
- Died: 16 May 1651 (aged 57); Plötzkau
- Noble family: Solms-Laubach
- Spouse: Joachim Ernst, Margrave of Brandenburg-Ansbach
- Issue Detail: Sophie; Frederick III; Albert II
- Father: John George I, Count of Solms-Laubach
- Mother: Margarethe of Schönburg-Glauchau

Sophie of Solms-Laubach (15 May 1594 – 16 May 1651), was a German regent, Margravine of Brandenburg-Ansbach by marriage to Joachim Ernst, and regent during the minority of her son from 1625 until 1639.

== Early life ==
Sophie's parents were Count Johann Georg I of Solms-Laubach (1547–1600) and his wife, Margarethe of Schönburg-Glauchau (1554–1606).

== Biography ==
She married Margrave Joachim Ernst of Brandenburg-Ansbach in 1612. After her husband's death in 1625, she took over the reign of the Margraviate of Brandenburg-Ansbach, as guardian and regent for her minor son Frederick. Frederick died in 1634 in the Battle of Nördlingen, shortly after he came of age. Sophie then continued reigning as regent for her son Albert, until he came of age in 1639. She was supported during her reign by her brother Count Frederick of Solms-Rödelheim, who served as an Imperial chamberlain.

== Offspring ==
Sophie of Solms-Laubach had a daughter and four sons:

- Sophie (1614–1646), married to Erdmann August of Brandenburg-Bayreuth
- Frederick (1616–1634), Margrave of Brandenburg-Ansbach
- Albert (1617-1617)
- Albert (1620–1667), Margrave of Brandenburg-Ansbach
- Christian (1623–1633)

Sophie of Solms-Laubach House of Solms-Laubach Born: 15 May 1594 Died: 16 May 1651
German nobility
Vacant Title last held by Sophie of Brunswick-Lüneburg	Margravine of Brandenburg-Ansbach; 14 October 1612 - 7 March 1625	Vacant Title next held by Henriette Louise of Württemberg-Mömpelgard
