= Frederick III of Brandenburg-Ansbach =

German nobleman

Frederick III
- Margrave of Brandenburg-Ansbach
- Born: 1 May 1616; Ansbach
- Died: 6 September 1634 (aged 18); Nördlingen
- House: Hohenzollern
- Father: Joachim Ernst, Margrave of Brandenburg-Ansbach
- Mother: Sophie of Solms-Laubach

Frederick III, Margrave of Brandenburg-Ansbach (1 May 1616, Ansbach – 6 September 1634, Nördlingen) was a German nobleman. He was the eldest son of Joachim Ernst, Margrave of Brandenburg-Ansbach, who he succeeded in 1625. He was killed at the Battle of Nördlingen in 1634 unmarried and without issue, meaning he was succeeded by his younger brother Albert II.

== Ancestors ==
Ancestors of Frederick III of Brandenburg-Ansbach

16. Joachim I Nestor, Elector of Brandenburg
8. Joachim II Hector, Elector of Brandenburg
17. Elizabeth of Denmark, Norway, and Sweden
4. John George, Elector of Brandenburg
18. George, Duke of Saxony
9. Magdalena of Saxony
19. Barbara Jagiellon
2. Joachim Ernst, Margrave of Brandenburg-Ansbach
20. John V, Prince of Anhalt-Zerbst
10. Joachim Ernest, Prince of Anhalt
21. Margaret of Brandenburg (1511–1577)
5. Elisabeth of Anhalt-Zerbst
22. Wolfgang I, Count of Barby-Mühlingen
11. Agnes of Barby-Mühlingen
23. Agnes of Mansfeld
1. Frederick III, Margrave of Brandenburg-Ansbach
24. Otto of Solms-Laubach
12. Frederick Magnus I, Count of Solms-Laubach
25. Anna of Mecklenburg-Schwerin
6. John George I of Solms-Laubach
26. John III, Count of Wied
13. Agnes of Wied
27. Elisabeth of Nassau-Dillenburg
3. Sophie of Solms-Laubach
28. Ernest III of Schönburg-Waldenburg
14. George II of Schönburg-Glauchau
29. Amalia of Leisnig
7. Margaret of Schönburg-Glauchau
30. Henry XIII of Reuss-Plauen-Greiz
15. Dorothea of Reuss-Plauen
31. Amalia of Mansfeld-Vorderort

Frederick III of Brandenburg-Ansbach House of Hohenzollern Born: 1 May 1616 Died: 6 September 1634
Regnal titles
Preceded by Joachim Ernst	Margrave of Brandenburg-Ansbach; 1625–1634	Succeeded by Albert II
