= Frederick Augustus, Prince of Anhalt-Zerbst =

Frederick Augustus
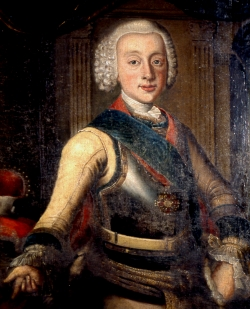

Prince of Anhalt-Zerbst
- Reign: 16 March 1747– 3 March 1793
- Predecessor: Christian August
- Born: 8 August 1734; Alt Stettin, Pomerania, Prussia (now Szczecin, Poland)
- Died: 3 March 1793 (aged 58); Luxembourg
- Spouse: Princess Caroline Wilhelmina Sophia of Hesse-Kassel; Friederike Auguste Sophie of Anhalt-Bernburg
- House: Ascania
- Father: Christian August, Prince of Anhalt-Zerbst
- Mother: Princess Johanna Elisabeth of Holstein-Gottorp
- Religion: Lutheran

Frederick Augustus, Prince of Anhalt-Zerbst (8 August 1734 in Alt Stettin – 3 March 1793 in Luxembourg), was a German prince of the House of Ascania and the last ruler of the Principality of Anhalt-Zerbst before the family line went extinct.

== Life ==
He was the second and sole surviving son of Christian Augustus, Prince of Anhalt-Zerbst (since 1742 of all Anhalt-Zerbst) by his wife Johanna Elisabeth of Holstein-Gottorp, daughter of Christian August of Schleswig-Holstein-Gottorp, Prince of Eutin (Prince-Bishop of Lubeck).

He was also the younger brother of Catherine The Great.

Frederick Augustus succeeded his father in Anhalt-Zerbst in 1747, at the age of thirteen. His mother, the Princess Johanna Elisabeth, acted as regent on his behalf until 1752.

He was one of the sovereigns who supported Britain in the American Revolutionary War with soldiers, sending 1,228 men. His actions were opposed to the policy of the Holy Roman Emperor and to the moral sense of the age, but he received a substantial monetary compensation.

In 1776 he granted religious tolerance in his lands.

Due to a quarrel with the Kingdom of Prussia, he was forced to flee into exile in Basel and later Luxembourg, where he died.

== Marriages and succession ==
Royal monogram.

In Zerbst on 17 November 1753 Frederick Augustus first married Caroline (b. Kassel, 10 May 1732 – d. Zerbst, 22 May 1759), daughter of Prince Maximilian of Hesse-Kassel and granddaughter of Charles I, Landgrave of Hesse-Kassel. The marriage was childless.

In Ballenstedt on 27 May 1764 Frederick Augustus married secondly Fredericka Auguste Sophie (b. Ballenstedt, 28 August 1744 – d. Coswig, 12 April 1827), daughter of Victor Frederick, Prince of Anhalt-Bernburg. Like the first marriage, this union was childless.

On his death the line of Anhalt-Zerbst became extinct and the succession to the principality was disputed between the other branches of Anhalt-Bernburg, Anhalt-Köthen and Anhalt-Dessau; finally, in 1796 Anhalt-Zerbst was divided and ceased to exist.

The dominion of Jever (which was annexed to Zerbst by the marriage of Prince Rudolph with Magdalene of Oldenburg, heiress of that land) was ruled under the Semi-Salic Law; for this, was given to the Empress Catherine II of Russia, born Princess Sophie Friederike Auguste of Anhalt-Zerbst and Frederick Augustus's only surviving sibling. Her sister-in-law Princess Friederike Auguste Sophie of Anhalt-Bernburg ruled the territory of Jever as regent-governor on Catherine the Great's behalf until Napoleon's invasion in 1806.

Preceded by Christian Augustus	Prince of Anhalt-Zerbst; 1747–1793	Succeeded by Principality divided between Anhalt-Bernburg, Anhalt-Köthen and Anhalt-Dessau
