= Princess Wilhelmina of Hesse-Kassel =

Prussian princess (1726–1808)

Princess Wilhelmina
- Princess Henry of Prussia
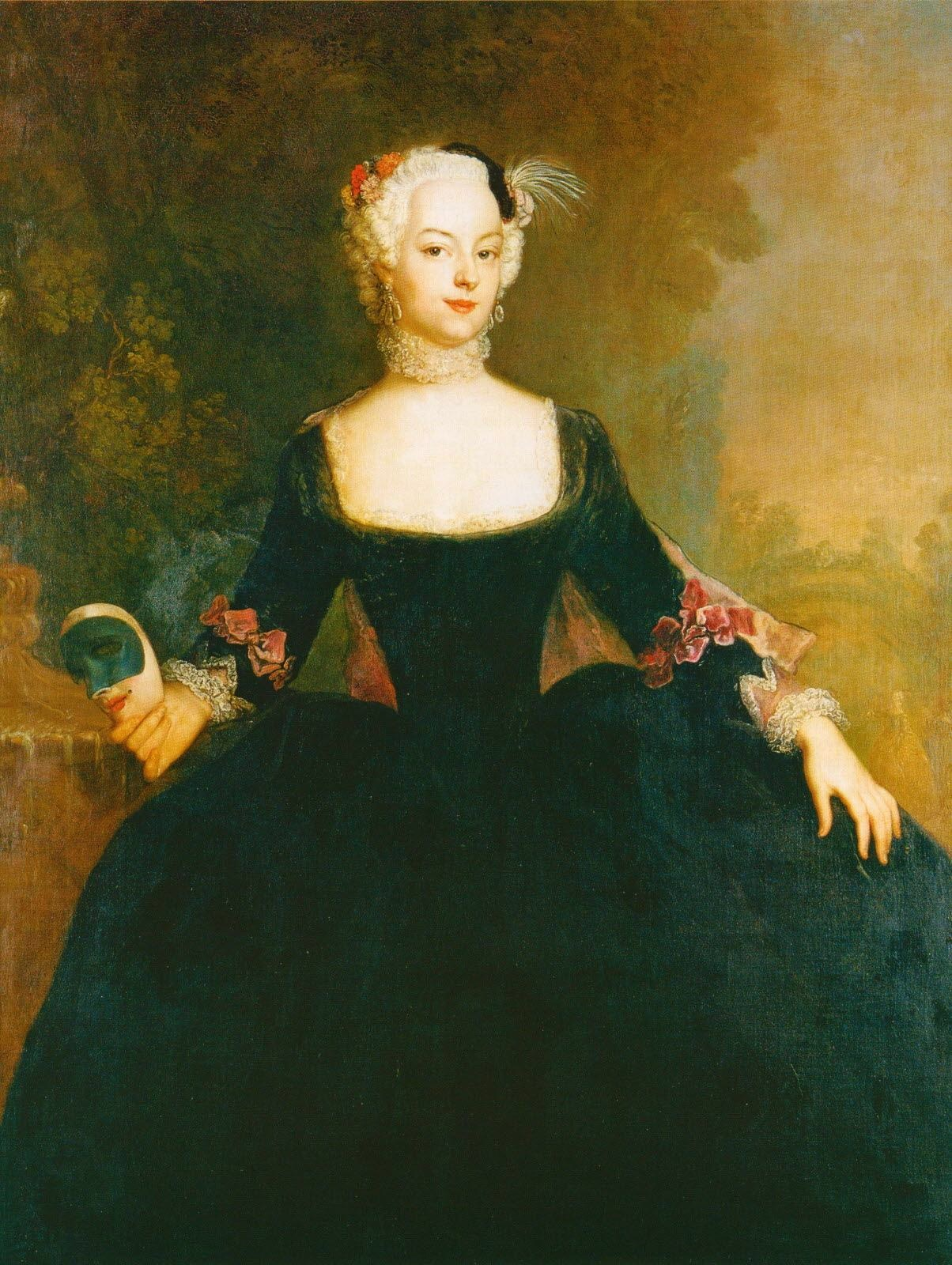
- Portrait by Antoine Pesne
- Born: 25 February 1726; Hesse-Kassel, Holy Roman Empire
- Died: 8 October 1808 (aged 82); Berlin, Kingdom of Prussia
- Burial: Berlin Cathedral
- Spouse: Prince Henry of Prussia (m. 1752; died 1802)
- House: Hesse-Kassel
- Father: Prince Maximilian of Hesse-Kassel
- Mother: Friederike Charlotte of Hesse-Darmstadt

Prince Henry's Palace, Berlin

Princess Wilhelmina of Hesse-Kassel (25 February 1726 – 8 October 1808) was a Prussian princess, married to Prince Henry of Prussia.

== Early life and ancestry ==
Born into the House of Hesse, Wilhelmina was the daughter of Prince Maximilian of Hesse-Kassel and his wife, Friederike Charlotte of Hesse-Darmstadt, and the niece of William VIII, Landgrave of Hesse-Kassel and King Frederick I of Sweden.

== Biography ==
She was introduced to Henry when he visited Kassel in 1751 and was married to him on 25 June 1752 at Charlottenburg Palace. Henry's eldest brother, King Frederick the Great, insisted that his brother marry, of course equally, just as their father had once arranged Frederick's marriage against his will. He only left him the choice of which of the sisters from the House of Hesse he wanted.

Wilhelmina was described as a charming beauty. Wilhelmina and Henry had their own court and lived at Schloss Rheinsberg and Berlin. Wilhelmina had no children with Henry, who was reported to pay more attention to his male friends than to her. At his marriage Henry described the situation to his siblings that he was "changing from the captivity of the king to the captivity of marriage". Although the whole court spied on her behavior, she always managed to appear in a good mood and not to offer court gossip a target thanks to her consistently friendly demeanor.

The couple separated in 1766 after an alleged affair on Wilhelmina's side. After the separation, she lived in the Prince Henry Palace in Berlin, on the grand boulevard Unter den Linden, which the king had built for his brother between 1748 and 1753 (today the main building of the Humboldt University of Berlin). She occupied one half of the building while her husband lived in the other.

She was popular with her husband's family, especially his brothers, while her husband was more distant towards her. Nevertheless, the Duke of Nevers wrote about Henry: "He shows more consideration for his wife than his brother." (What was meant was the behavior of the king to his wife Queen Elisabeth Christine.)

The Swedish princess Hedvig Elisabeth Charlotte of Holstein-Gottorp described her at the time of her visit in 1798:

She was a tall and handsome lady with a well kept figure, though very thin, and you can still see how remarkably beautiful she was in her youth. Her eyes are big and lively though somewhat protruding, and with a restless look. She is witty and literal, but as a consequence of her age, she sometimes talks of several subjects at the same time. Her manners are regal, and she represents perfectly, and was additionally very polite and toward me very pleasant.

She was one of the few members of the royal house to remain in Berlin during the French occupation in 1806. While most of the royal family left, reportedly because of the anti-Napoleonic criticisms they had expressed, and the members of the royal court either followed them or left the capital for their country estates, Wilhelmina remained with Prince Augustus Ferdinand of Prussia and his consort Margravine Elisabeth Louise of Brandenburg-Schwedt because of "their high age" as well as Princess Augusta of Prussia, who was pregnant at the time.
