= Joachim Ernest, Margrave of Brandenburg-Ansbach =

Joachim Ernst
- Margrave of Brandenburg-Ansbach
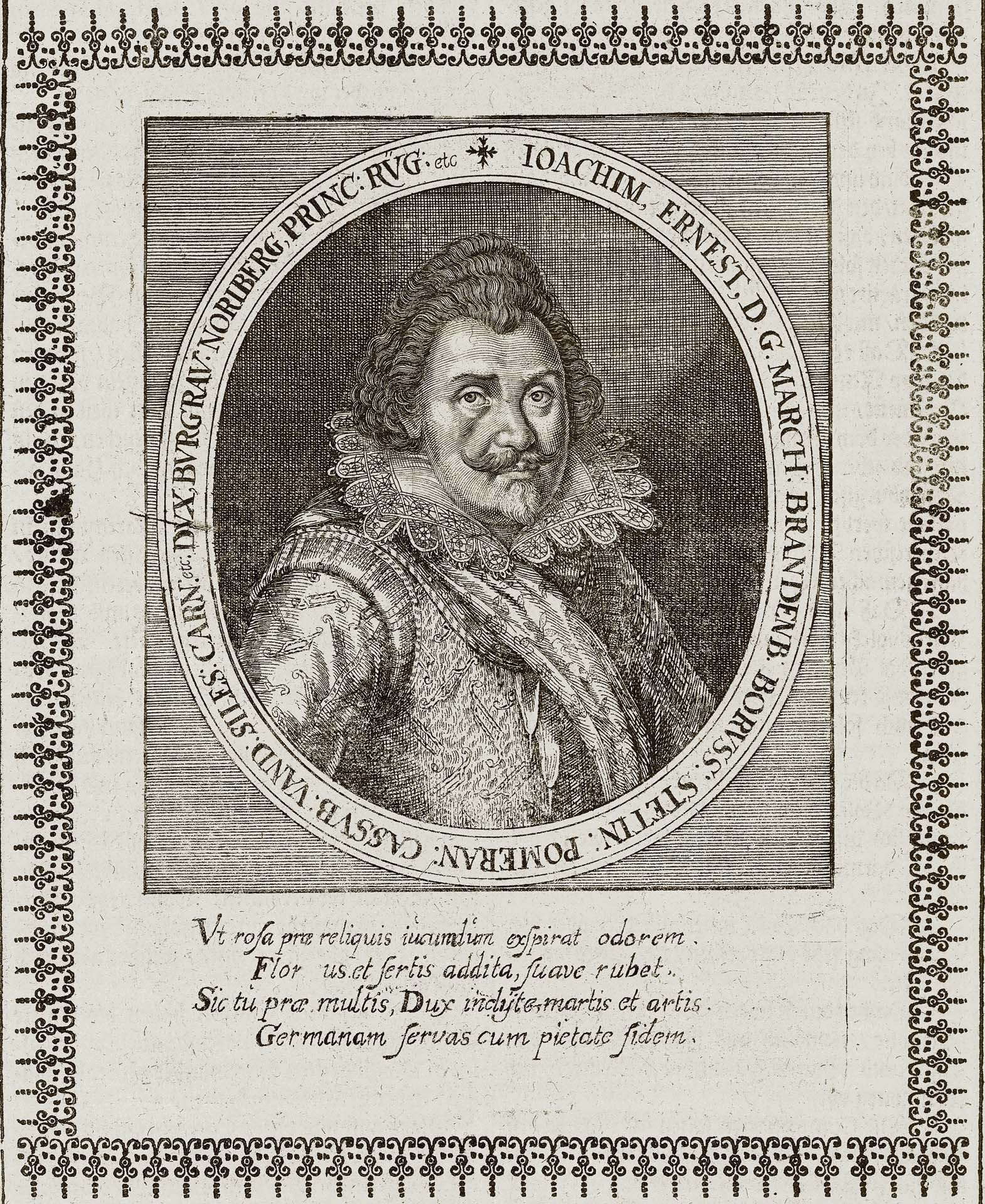
- Joachim Ernst - engraved portrait from Theatrum Europaeum, 1662
- Born: 22 June 1583; Cölln an der Spree
- Died: 7 March 1625 (aged 41); Ansbach
- Spouse: Sophie of Solms-Laubach
- Issue Detail: Sophie; Frederick III; Albert II
- House: Hohenzollern
- Father: John George, Elector of Brandenburg
- Mother: Elisabeth of Anhalt-Zerbst

Joachim Ernst, Margrave of Brandenburg-Ansbach (22 June 1583 in Cölln an der Spree – 7 March 1625 in Ansbach) was a German nobleman. He ruled as margrave of Brandenburg-Ansbach from 1603 to 1625, succeeding his cousin George Frederick and succeeded by his son Frederick III.

== Life ==
=== Youth ===
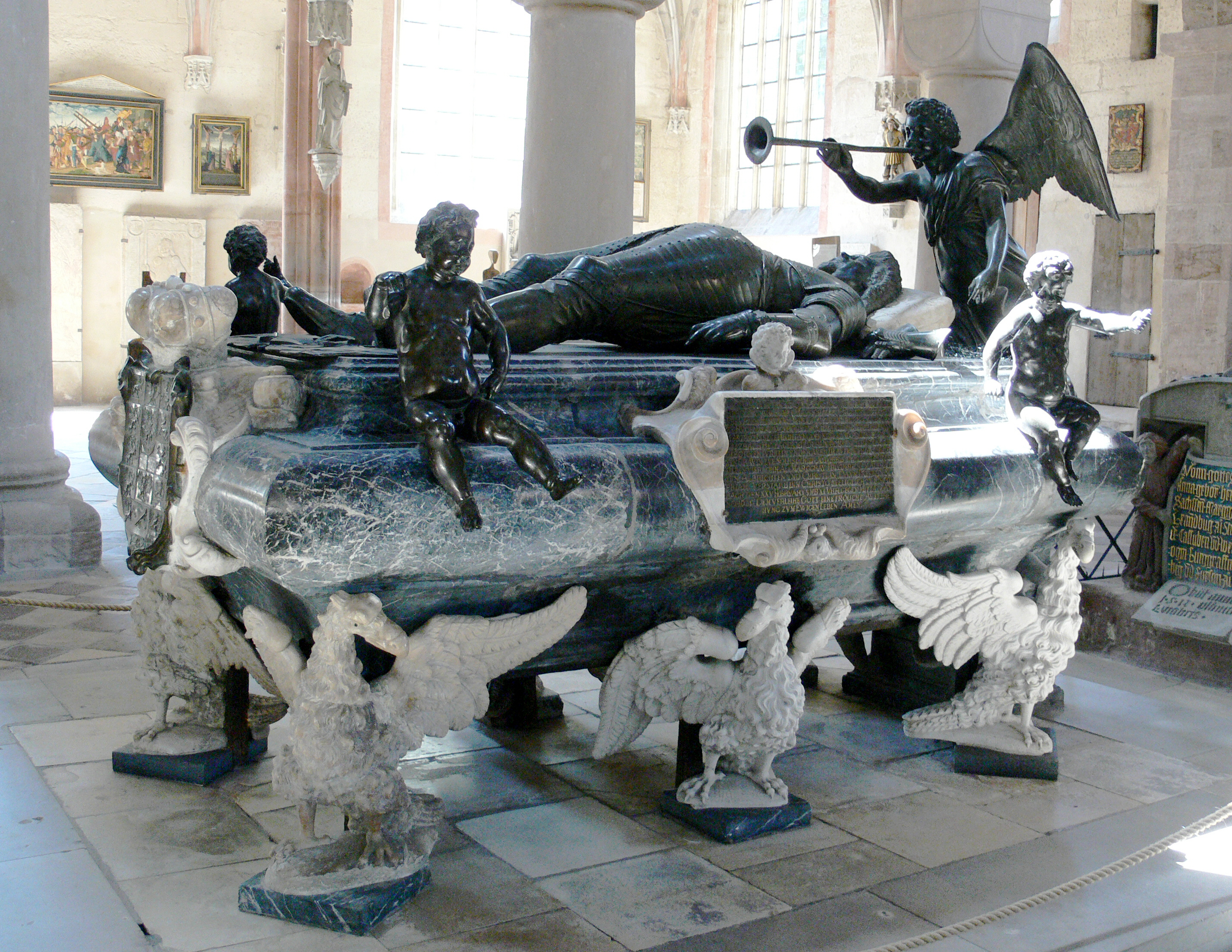
Tomb of the Margrave in the minster in Heilsbronn

Joachim Ernst was the son of the elector John George of Brandenburg and his third wife, Elisabeth of Anhalt-Zerbst. He travelled in England and Scotland in 1599.

He took over in 1603, the government of the Margraviate of Brandenburg-Ansbach, after the old line of Franconian Hohenzollerns died out with the death of George Fredrick the Elder of the Ansbach-Jägerndorf branch. Joachim Ernst founded the younger branch of Ansbach line of the Franconian Hohenzollerns.

=== Succession rules ===
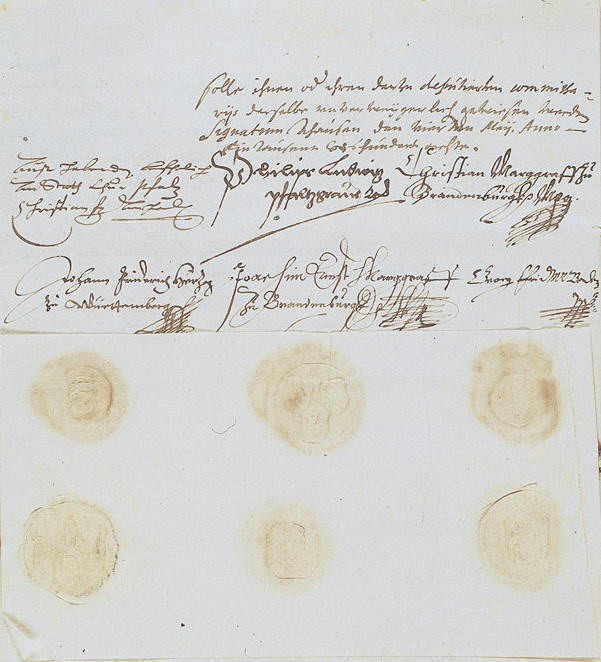
Charter of association of the Protestant Union in Auhausen on 14 May 1608 (now in the Bavarian State Archives): the signature of Margrave Joachim Ernst of Brandenburg is in the center

His predecessor, George Frederick had settled the succession of his two Franconian possessions (Brandenburg-Ansbach and Brandenburg-Kulmbach) in the House Treaty of Gera of 1598. In accordance with the provisions of this treaty, Margrave Joachim Ernst ruled Brandenburg-Ansbach and his brother Christian ruled neighboring Brandenburg-Kulmbach (Christian later moved his capital to Bayreuth, thereby changing its name to Brandenburg-Bayreuth).

=== Protestant Union ===
In the religious conflicts of the early 17th Century, Joachim Ernst tended to be in the Protestant-Calvinist camp and he also supported the Dutch struggle for independence. He took an active part in bringing about the Protestant Alliance of the Protestant Union, which was founded in 1608 on his territory, in the secularized monastery at Auhausen, near Nördlingen. He served Elector Johann Sigismund during the War of the Julich Succession, and negotiated the Treaty of Dortmund. He favored a militant approach to the conflict.

The Union was, however, dissolved again in 1621, after the outbreak of the Thirty Years' War, in view of the military superiority of the imperial camp. After the dissolution of the Union, Joachim Ernst was held responsible for the outbreak of war by his Catholic opponents and he then completely distanced himself from his former allies.

== Marriage and issue ==
In 1612, he married Sophie of Solms-Laubach (1594–1651). They had five children:

- Sophie (1614–1646)

married in 1641 Margrave Erdmann August of Brandenburg-Bayreuth (1615–1651)

- Frederick III (1616–1634), Margrave of Brandenburg-Ansbach
- Albert (26 March 1617) died at birth.
- Albert II (1620–1667), Margrave of Brandenburg-Ansbach

married firstly in 1642 Princess Henriette Louise of Württemberg-Mömpelgard (1623–1650)
married secondly in 1651 Countess Sophia Margaret of Oettingen-Oettingen (1634–1664)
married thirdly in 1665 Princess Christine of Baden-Durlach (1645–1705)

- Christian (10 September 1623 – 15 April 1633) died in childhood.

== Ancestors ==
Ancestors of Joachim Ernest, Margrave of Brandenburg-Ansbach

16. John Cicero, Elector of Brandenburg
8. Joachim I Nestor, Elector of Brandenburg
17. Margaret of Thuringia
4. Joachim II Hector, Elector of Brandenburg
18. John of Denmark
9. Elizabeth of Denmark
19. Christina of Saxony
2. John George, Elector of Brandenburg
20. Albert, Duke of Saxony
10. George, Duke of Saxony
21. Sidonie of Poděbrady
5. Magdalena of Saxony
22. Casimir IV Jagiellon
11. Barbara Jagiellon
23. Elisabeth of Austria
1. Joachim Ernst, Margrave of Brandenburg-Ansbach
24. Ernest I, Prince of Anhalt-Dessau
12. John V, Prince of Anhalt-Zerbst
25. Margaret of Münsterberg-Oels
6. Joachim Ernest, Prince of Anhalt
26. Joachim I Nestor, Elector of Brandenburg
13. Margaret of Brandenburg
27. Elizabeth of Denmark
3. Elisabeth of Anhalt-Zerbst
28. Burchard V, Count of Barby-Mühlingen
14. Wolfgang I, Count of Barby
29. Magdalena of Mecklenburg-Stargard
7. Agnes of Barby-Mühlingen
30. Gebhard VII, Count of Mansfeld-Mittelort
15. Agnes of Mansfeld-Mittelort
31. Margeret of Gleichen-Blankenheim

Joachim Ernest, Margrave of Brandenburg-Ansbach House of Hohenzollern Born: 22 June 1583 Died: 7 March 1625
Preceded by George Frederick	Margrave of Brandenburg-Ansbach; 1603–1625	Succeeded by Frederick III
