= Frederick August I of Oldenburg =

Duke of Oldenburg from 1774 to 1785

Frederick Augustus I
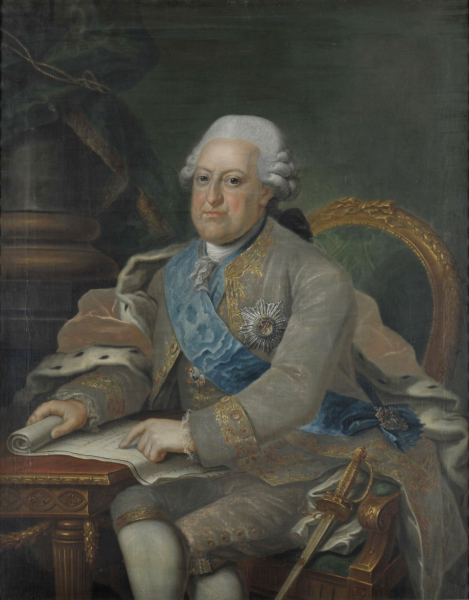
- Portrait by Theodor Friedrich Stein, 1781

Duke of Oldenburg
- Reign: 1774–1785
- Predecessor: Kings of Denmark as counts
- Successor: William I
- Born: 20 September 1711; Gottorp, Schleswig
- Died: 6 July 1785 (aged 73); Oldenburg
- Spouse: Princess Ulrike Friederike Wilhelmine of Hesse-Kassel (m. 1752)
- Issue: Wilhelm, Duke of Oldenburg; Princess Luise; Hedvig Elisabeth Charlotte, Queen of Sweden and Norway
Names
- German: Friedrich August
- House: Holstein-Gottorp
- Father: Christian August of Holstein-Gottorp, Prince of Eutin
- Mother: Margravine Albertina Frederica of Baden-Durlach
- Religion: Protestant

Frederick Augustus I (German: Friedrich August) (20 September 1711 – 6 July 1785) was Prince-Bishop of Lübeck from 1750 to 1785, and Count and later the first Duke of Oldenburg from 1773 to 1785.

== Early life ==
Frederick Augustus was the son of Christian August, regent of Holstein-Gottorp and his wife Margravine Albertine Friederike of Baden-Durlach. He was born in Gottorp, Schleswig.

== Marriage and issue ==
Frederick Augustus married on 21 November 1752 to Princess Ulrike Friederike Wilhelmine of Hesse-Kassel; the couple had three children:

- Peter Friedrich Wilhelm, Duke of Oldenburg (3 January 1754 – 2 July 1823)
- Luise of Holstein-Gottorp-Oldenburg (2 October 1756 – 31 July 1759), died in infancy
- Hedwig Elisabeth Charlotte (22 March 1759 – 20 June 1818), Queen of Sweden and Norway as wife of Charles XIII of Sweden.

== Later life ==
Empress Catherine the Great of Russia, on behalf of her son Paul of Russia, last of the Dukes of Holstein-Gottorp, ceded the lands of that duchy to Denmark. In exchange, Denmark ceded the Duchy of Oldenburg to the Prince Bishops of Lübeck, a cadet branch of the Dukes of Gottorp. Thus, Friederich August of Holstein-Gottorp, Prince Bishop of Lübeck, became Duke of Oldenburg.

Frederick Augustus died on 6 July 1785 in Oldenburg. His son and heir apparent, Peter Friedrich Wilhelm, succeeded him as Wilhelm I, Duke of Oldenburg.

== Ancestry ==
Ancestors of Frederick August I of Oldenburg

16. John Adolf, Duke of Holstein-Gottorp
8. Frederick III, Duke of Holstein-Gottorp
17. Augusta of Denmark
4. Christian Albert, Duke of Holstein-Gottorp
18. John George I, Elector of Saxony
9. Marie Elisabeth of Saxony
19. Magdalene Sibylle of Prussia
2. Christian August of Holstein-Gottorp, Prince of Eutin
20. Christian IV of Denmark
10. Frederick III of Denmark
21. Anne Catherine of Brandenburg
5. Frederikke Amalie of Denmark
22. George, Duke of Brunswick-Lüneburg
11. Sophie Amalie of Brunswick-Lüneburg
23. Anne Eleonore of Hesse-Darmstadt
1. Frederick Augustus I, Duke of Oldenburg
24. Frederick V, Margrave of Baden-Durlach
12. Frederick VI, Margrave of Baden-Durlach
25. Barbara of Württemberg
6. Frederick VII, Margrave of Baden-Durlach
26. John Casimir, Count Palatine of Kleeburg
13. Christina Magdalena of the Palatinate-Zweibrücken
27. Catharina of Sweden
3. Albertina Frederica of Baden-Durlach
28. John Adolf, Duke of Holstein-Gottorp (= 16)
14. Frederick III, Duke of Holstein-Gottorp (= 8)
29. Augusta of Denmark (= 17)
7. Augusta Marie of Holstein-Gottorp
30. John George I, Elector of Saxony (= 18)
15. Marie Elisabeth of Saxony (= 9)
31. Magdalene Sibylle of Prussia(= 19)

== See also ==
- Rulers of Oldenburg

== Bibliography ==
- Merzdorf, Theodor (1877). "Friedrich August (Herzog von Oldenburg)" . Allgemeine Deutsche Biographie (in German). Vol. 7. Leipzig: Duncker & Humblot. pp. 575–576.
- Müller, Bernd (2018). "Herzog und Fürstbischof Friedrich August von Holstein-Gottorp. Eine biografische Studie". Eutiner Forschungen (in German). 14. Eutin. ISBN 978-3-939 643-20-3.
- Rüdebusch, Dieter (1992). "Friedrich August, Herzog von Oldenburg, Fürstbischof von Lübeck". In Friedl, Hans; Günther, Wolfgang; Günther-Arndt, Hilke; Schmidt, Heinrich (eds.). Biographisches Handbuch zur Geschichte des Landes Oldenburg (in German). Oldenburg: Isensee Verlag. pp. 210–211. ISBN 3-89442-135-5.

Frederick August I of Oldenburg House of Holstein-Gottorp Cadet branch of the House of Oldenburg Born: 20 September 1711 Died: 6 July 1785
Regnal titles
Preceded by Adolf Frederick of Sweden	Lutheran; Prince-Bishop of Lübeck; 1750–1785	Succeeded by Peter I of Oldenburg
Preceded by Paul I	Count of Oldenburg; 1773	Elevated to duchy
New title	Duke of Oldenburg; 1774–1785	Succeeded by William
