= Herford Abbey =

Oldest women's religious house in the Duchy of Saxony

Coordinates: 52°06′47″N 8°40′13″E

Imperial Abbey of Herford Reichsfrauenstift Herford
- 1147–1802
- Coat of arms

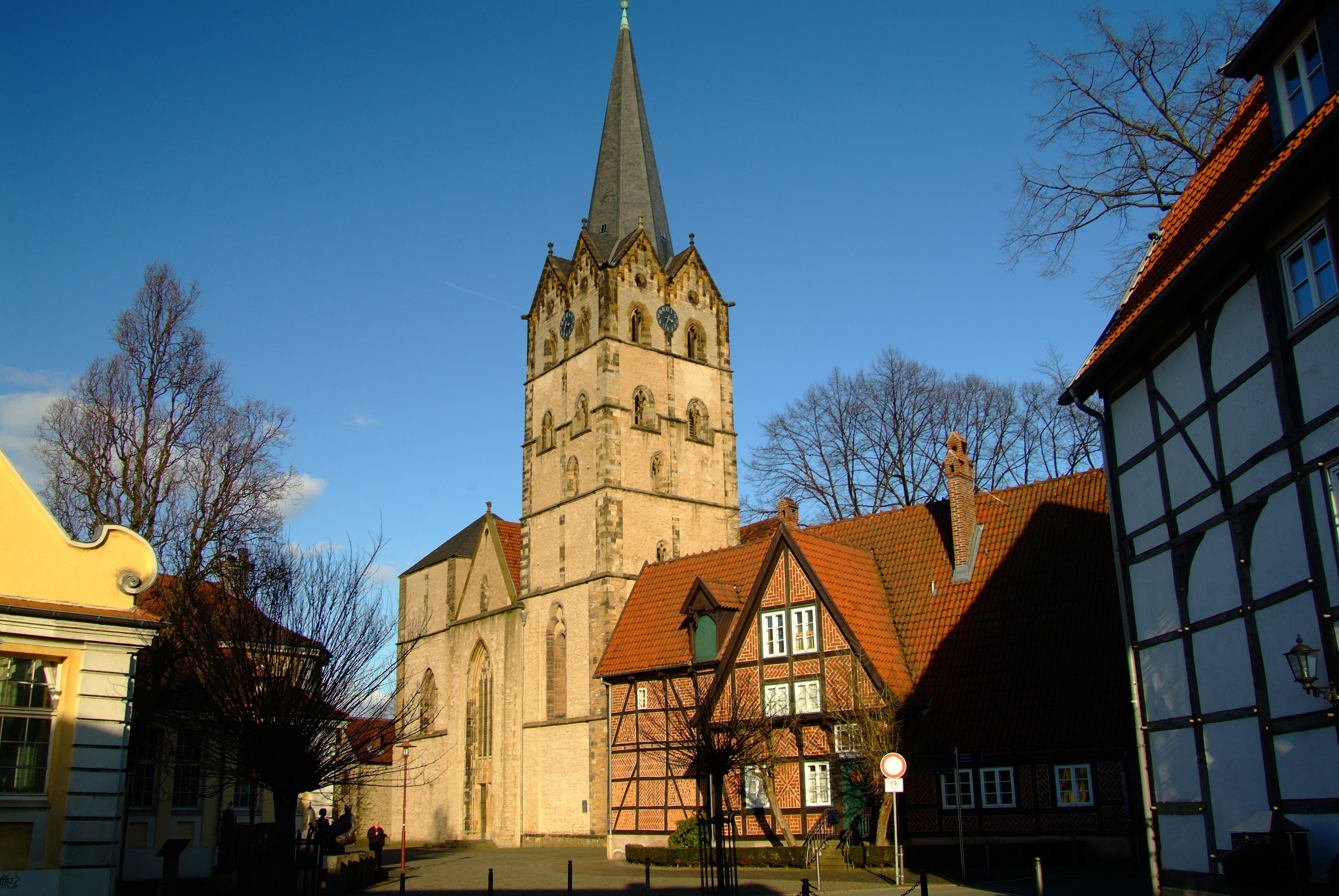
- Former Herford Abbey church, now Herford Minster
- Status: Imperial Abbey
- Common languages: West Low German
- Historical era: Middle Ages
  - Dedicated as Imperial abbey under Louis the Pious: 832
  - Herford gained city rights: 973 1147
  - Both abbey and city gained Imperial immediacy: 1147
  - City joined Hanseatic Lg.: 1342
  - City's immediacy confirmed: 1631
  - City annexed by Mgvt Brandenburg: 1652
  - Secularised: 1802
  - Annexed by Cty Ravensberg: 25 February 1803
Preceded by	Succeeded by
Duchy of Saxony	County of Ravensberg
- Today part of: Germany

Herford Abbey (German: Frauenstift Herford) was the oldest women's religious house in the Duchy of Saxony. It was founded as a house of secular canonesses in 789, initially in Müdehorst (near the modern Bielefeld) by a nobleman called Waltger, who moved it in about 800 onto the lands of his estate Herivurth (later Oldenhervorde) which stood at the crossing of a number of important roads and fords over the Aa and the Werre. The present city of Herford grew up on this site around the abbey.

== History ==
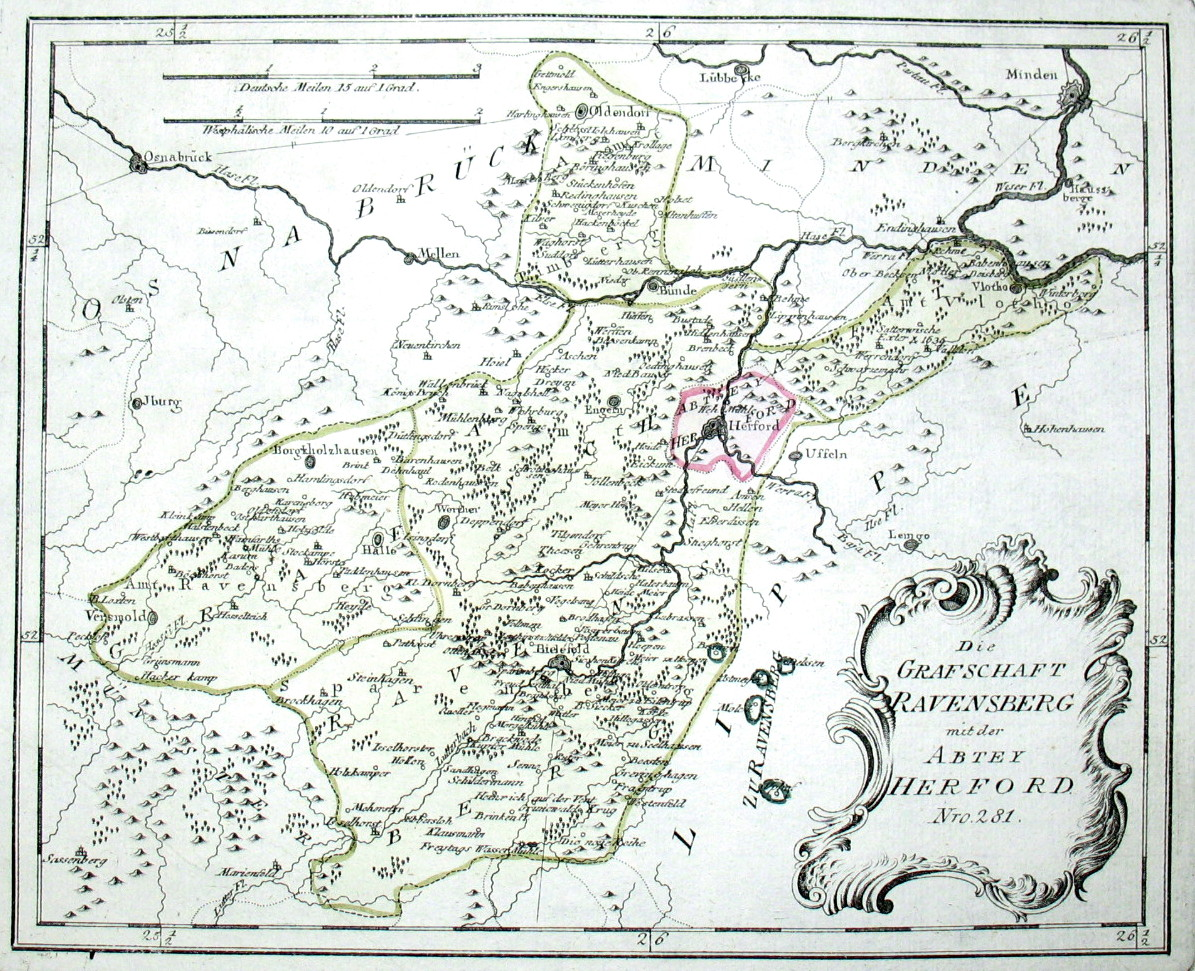
Territory of Herford Abbey (circled in purple) on a late 18th century map

=== 9th–12th centuries ===
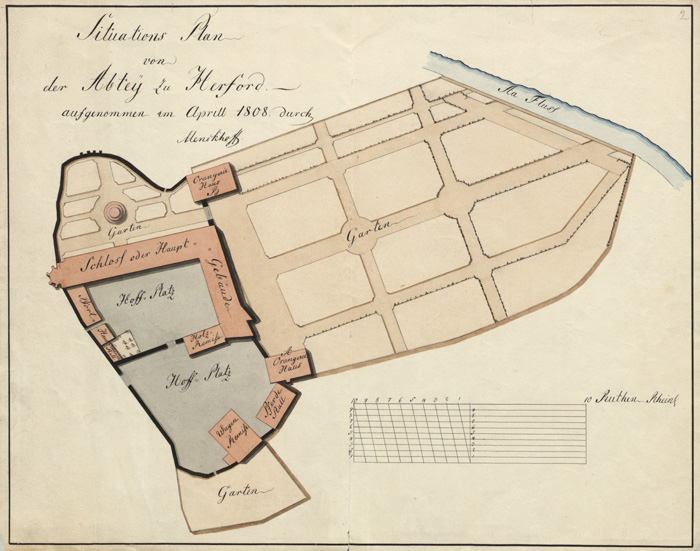
Plan of the Abbey (1808)

The abbey was dedicated in 832 and was elevated to the status of a Reichsabtei ("Imperial abbey") under Emperor Louis the Pious (d. 840). In ecclesiastical matters it was answerable directly to the Pope and was endowed with a third of the estates originally intended for Corvey Abbey.

In 860, at the instigation of the abbess Haduwy (Hedwig), the bones of Saint Pusinna, later the patron saint of Herford, were brought from her hermitage at Binson ("vicus bausionensis" near Châlons-en-Champagne, Corbie). The presence of these relics in the abbey increased its importance and its dedication was changed in due course to Saints Mary and Pusinna.

In the time of the abbess Matilda I her granddaughter Matilda, later Saint Matilda, was brought up here. In 909, through the negotiations of her grandmother, she was married to Henry, Duke of Saxony and later King Henry I of Germany.

Between 919 and 924 Herford was destroyed by Hungarians but was rebuilt by 927.

=== Reichsunmittelbarkeit ===
In 1147 the abbey, which by this time had almost 850 estates and farms, was granted Imperial immediacy (German: Reichsunmittelbarkeit). This made it an independent territory within the Holy Roman Empire (although admittedly a very small one, comprising part of the area of the present city of Herford) which lasted until 1803. The abbesses became Imperial princesses (German: Reichsfürstinnen) and sat in the Reichstag in the College of Prelates of the Rhine. The territory belonged to the Lower Rhenish-Westphalian Circle.

The first Vögte seem to have been the Billunger, and after they died out, Henry the Lion, who appointed the Counts of Schwalenberg as under-Vögte. From 1180, after the fall of Henry the Lion, they exercised the same function for the Archbishopric of Cologne and the Duchy of Westphalia. By 1261 the office seems to have passed to the Counts of Sternberg and in 1382 to the Counts of Jülich-Berg.

In the vicinity of the abbey there grew up the town of Herford, which had acquired municipal rights by 1170/1180 and later, as the Reichsstadt Herford, acquired Reichsunmittelbarkeit in its own right.

By the end of the 15th century, "Sancta Herfordia" ("Holy Herford"), as it became known, had some 37 churches, chapels, monasteries and other religious houses, and hospitals. Its spiritual life was thus comparable to that of a great centre such as Cologne.

=== Reformation ===
In 1533, during the Reformation, Herford Abbey became Lutheran, under the Electors of Brandenburg. From 1649 for over a century the abbesses were all Calvinist but that did not alter the Lutheran character of the principality.

=== Dissolution ===
In 1802 the abbey was dissolved in the course of secularisation under the terms of the Reichsdeputationshauptschluss and on 25 February 1803 was annexed to the County of Ravensberg, which belonged to the Kingdom of Prussia. In 1804 it was turned into a collegiate foundation for men, and in 1810 finally suppressed.

The former abbey church remains in use as Herford Minster (Herforder Münster).

== Abbesses ==
Name	Image	Reign	Notes	House
Theodrata, Tetta		383 - after 840		
Adilla		before 844 - 853		
Hedwig		before 858 - after 888		Esikonen
Matilda I		before 908 - after 911		Immedingian
Imma		before 973 - after 995	Rebuilt the abbey after the Hungarian invasion of 926	Billunger
Godesdiu		before 1002 - after 140		Billunger
Swanhild		before 1051 - 1076		
Gertrud I		before 1138 - after 1139		
Jutta		berfore 1146 - after 1162		Arnsberg
Ludgard I		before 1163 - after 1170		
Eilika		c. 1212		
Gertrude II		before 1217 - after 1233		Lippe
Ida		before 1283 - after 1264		
Pinnosa		before 1263 - after 1276		
Mechthild II		before 1277 - after 1288		Waldeck
Irmgard		before 1290 - 1323		Wittgenstein
Lutgard II		1324 - 1360		Nicken
Heilwig		1361		Bentheim
Elisabeth I		1361 - 1374		Berg
Hillegund		1374 - 1409		Oetgenbach
Mechthild III		1409 - 1422		Waldeck
Margaret		1442 - 1443	Rival abbess to Mechthild III	Brunswick-Grubenhagen
Margaret I		1443 - 1475		Gleichen
Jakobe		1476 - 1479	Rival abbess to Margaret I	Neuenahr
Anna I		1476 - 1494		Hunolstein
Bonizet		1494 - 1524		Limburg-Stirum
Anna II		1524 - 1565		Limburg
Margaret II		1565 - 1578		Lippe
Felicitas I		1578 - 1621		Eberstein
Magdalene I		1586 - 1640		Lippe
Felicitas II		1578 - 1621		Eberstein
Magdalene II		1621 - 1640		Lippe
Sidonia		1640 - 1648	Became Princess-Abbess in 1648	Oldenburg

=== Princess-Abbesses ===
Name	Image	Reign	Notes	House
Sidonia		1648 - 1649		Oldenburg
Maria Clara Theresa		1629 - 1631	Rival abbess of Sidonia	Wartenberg
Elisabeth II		1649 - 1667		Palatine Zweibrücken
Elisabeth III		1667 - 1680		Palatinate-Simmern
Elisabeth IV		1680 - 1686		Anhalt-Dessau
Elisabeth V		1686 - 1688		Hesse-Kassel
Charlotte Sophie		1688 - 1728		Ketteler
Johanna Charlotte		1729 - 1750		Ascania
Hedwig Sophie				Holstein-Gottorp
Friederike Charlotte		1764 - 1802		Hohenzollern
Christine Charlotte		1766 - 1779	As coadjutor of Friederike Charlotte	Hesse-Kassel
