= Ernest Louis, Landgrave of Hesse-Darmstadt =

Ernest Louis
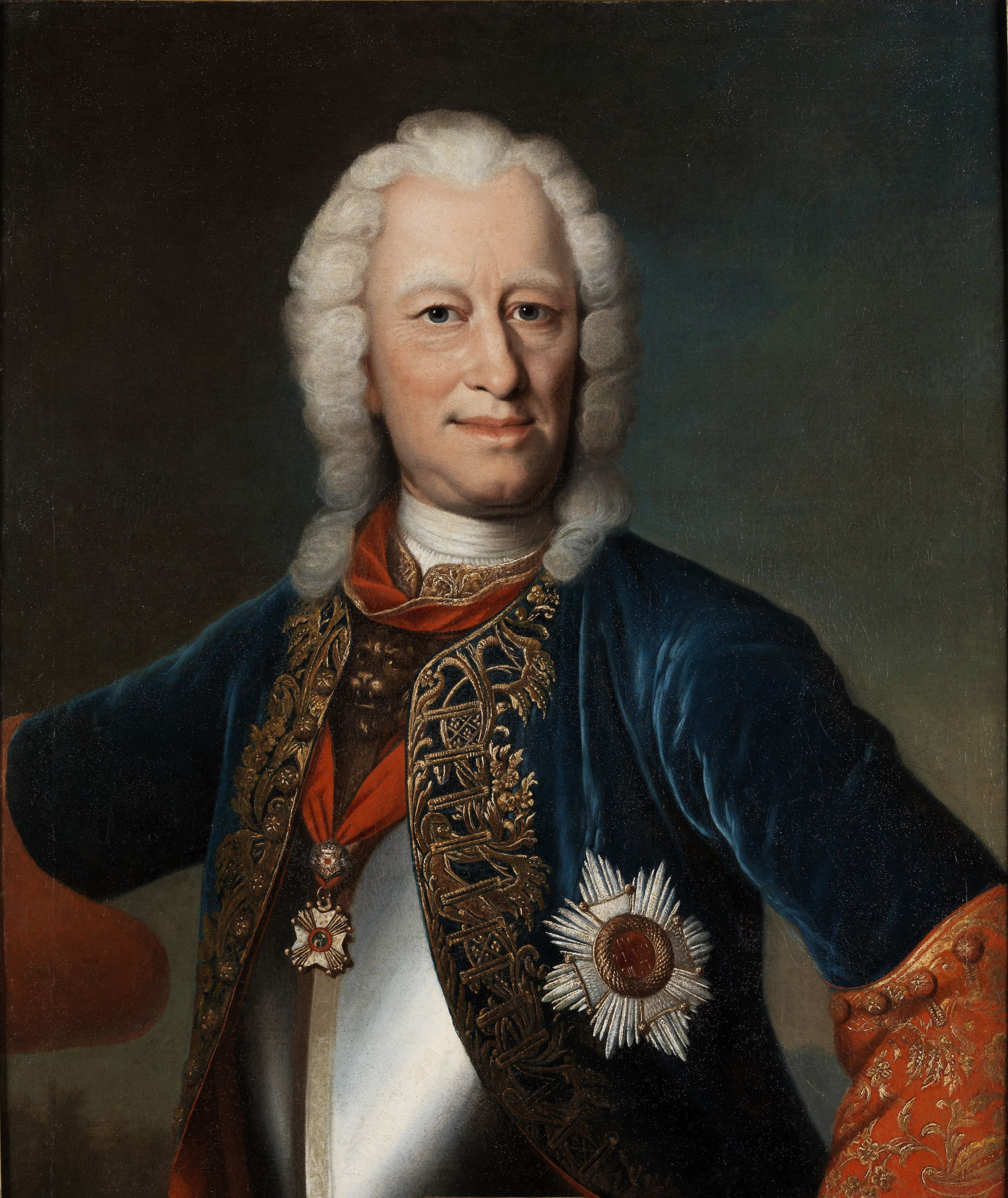
- Portrait of Ernst Ludwig by Johann Christian Fiedler

Landgrave of Hesse-Darmstadt
- Reign: 31 August 1678 – 12 September 1739
- Predecessor: Louis VII
- Successor: Louis VIII
- Born: 15 December 1667; Gotha
- Died: 12 September 1739 (aged 71); Jägersburg Castle, Einhausen
- Spouse: Dorothea Charlotte of Brandenburg-Ansbach (m. 1687; died 1705) Luise Sophie von Spiegel zum Desenberg (m. 1727)
- Issue: Dorothea Sophie, Countess of Hohenlohe-Öhringen; Louis VIII, Landgrave of Hesse-Darmstadt; Prince Charles William; Prince Francis Ernest; Friederike Charlotte, Princess Maximilian of Hesse-Kassel; Louisa Charlotte, Countess of Eppstein; Friederika Sophia, Countess von Eppstein and Baroness Johann Carl Ludwig Christian von Pretlack; Friedrich Carl Ludwig von Hohenstein zu Fürstenfeld (ill.)
- House: Hesse-Darmstadt
- Father: Louis VI, Landgrave of Hesse-Darmstadt
- Mother: Elisabeth Dorothea of Saxe-Gotha-Altenburg

Ernest Louis of Hesse-Darmstadt (German: Ernst Ludwig) (15 December 1667 – 12 September 1739) was Landgrave of Hesse-Darmstadt from 1678 to 1739. His parents were Landgrave Louis VI of Hesse-Darmstadt and Elisabeth Dorothea of Saxe-Gotha-Altenburg (1640–1709).

Ernest Louis's desire to emulate the French court under Louis XIV ran his country into debt. Among those patronized in this cultural milieu were the Baroque composer Christoph Graupner and the gambist Ernst Christian Hesse; also bringing into his service architect Louis Remy de la Fosse for his extensive building program. Upon his death in 1739, his country's debt was 4 million gulden, ten times the annual revenue.

== Family ==
Ernest Louis married Dorothea Charlotte of Brandenburg-Ansbach (1661–1705), daughter of Albert II, Margrave of Brandenburg-Ansbach (1620–1667) on 1 December 1687. Before her death in 1705, they were the parents of the following children:

- Dorothea Sophie (1689–1723), who married Count John Frederick of Hohenlohe-Öhringen (1683–1765) in 1710.
- Louis VIII, Landgrave of Hesse-Darmstadt (1691–1768), who married Countess Charlotte of Hanau-Lichtenberg (1700–1726) in 1717.
- Charles William (1693–1707), who died at the age of 13, during the War of Spanish Succession.
- Francis Ernest (1695–1716), who died at the age of 20 in Darmstadt.
- Friederike Charlotte (1698–1777), who married Landgrave Maximilian of Hesse-Kassel (1689–1753) in 1720.

Ernest Louis married his second wife Luise Sophie von Spiegel zum Desenberg (1690–1751), daughter of Hermann Wilhelm von Spiegel zu Desenberg and Claire Anna Helena von Hornberg, on 20 January 1727, who was thereafter raised to the rank of Countess of Eppstein. He had two daughters with her:

- Louisa Charlotte (1727–1753), Countess von Eppstein; she never married nor had children.
- Friederika Sophia (1730–1770), Countess von Eppstein; who married Baron Johann Carl Ludwig Christian von Pretlack (1716–1781) in 1764.

Ernest Louis had one additional illegitimate child with Charlotte von Forstner (1686–1727):

- Friedrich Carl Ludwig von Hohenstein zu Fürstenfeld (1711–1715)

== Ancestors ==
Ancestors of Ernest Louis, Landgrave of Hesse-Darmstadt

8. Louis V, Landgrave of Hesse-Darmstadt
4. George II, Landgrave of Hesse-Darmstadt
9. Magdalene of Brandenburg
2. Louis VI, Landgrave of Hesse-Darmstadt
10. John George I, Elector of Saxony
5. Sophia Eleonore of Saxony
11. Duchess Magdalene Sibylle of Prussia
1.Ernest Louis, Landgrave of Hesse-Darmstadt
12. John II, Duke of Saxe-Weimar
6. Ernest I, Duke of Saxe-Gotha
13. Dorothea Maria of Anhalt
3. Elisabeth Dorothea of Saxe-Gotha-Altenburg
14. John Philip, Duke of Saxe-Altenburg
7. Princess Elisabeth Sophie of Saxe-Altenburg
15. Elisabeth of Brunswick-Wolfenbüttel

Ernest Louis, Landgrave of Hesse-Darmstadt House of Hesse Born: 15 December 1667 Died: 12 September 1739
Regnal titles
Preceded by Louis VII	Landgrave of Hesse-Darmstadt; 1678–1739	Succeeded by Louis VIII
