= Albert II of Brandenburg-Ansbach =

German prince

Albert II
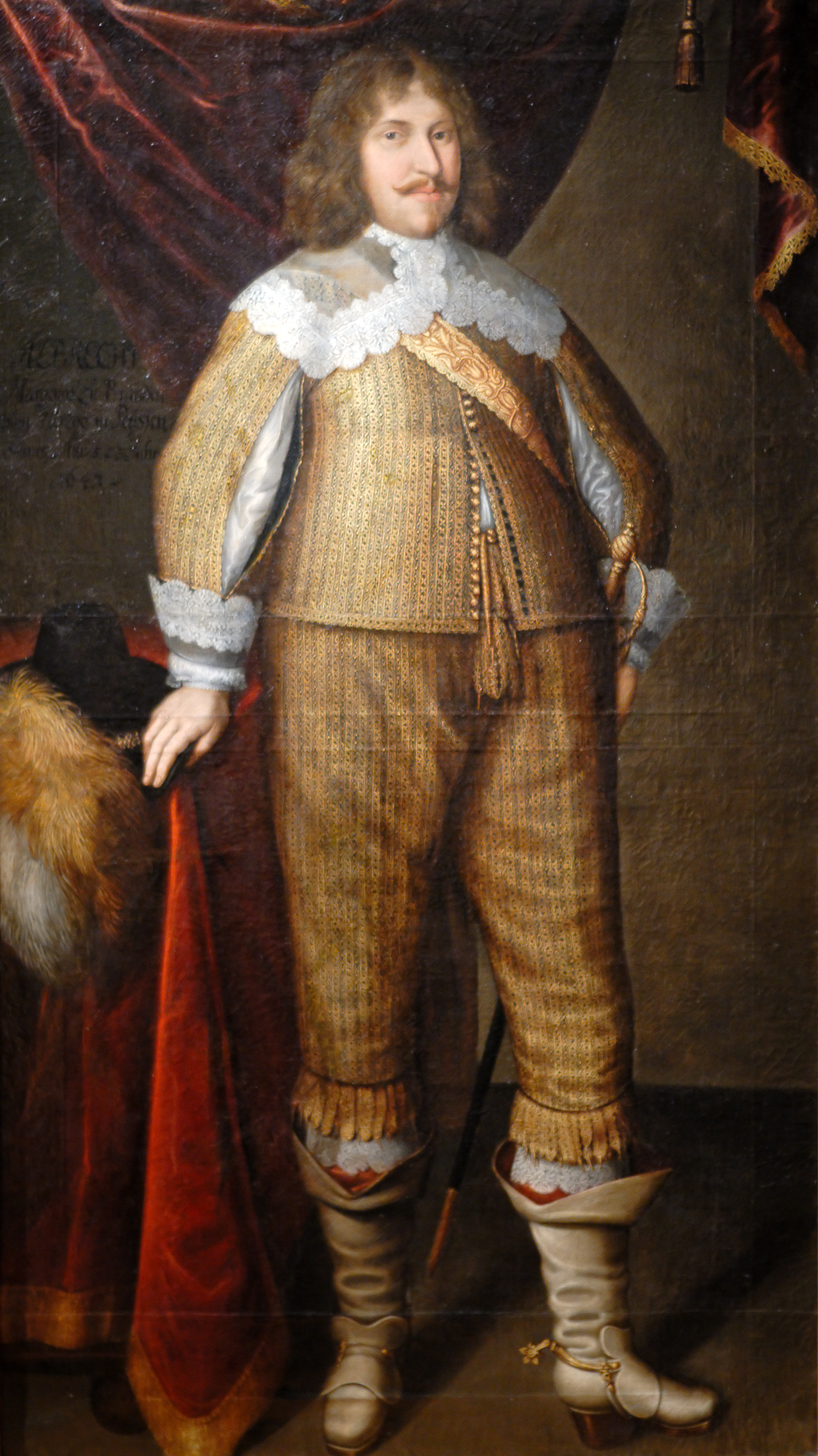
- 1643 portrait

Margrave of Brandenburg-Ansbach
- Reign: 6 September 1634 — 22 October 1667
- Predecessor: Frederick III
- Successor: John Frederick
- Born: 18 September 1620; Ansbach
- Died: 22 October 1667 (aged 47); Ansbach
- Burial: Johanniskirche in Ansbach
- Spouse: Henriette Louise of Württemberg-Mömpelgard; Sophie Margarete of Oettingen-Oettingen; Christine of Baden-Durlach
- Issue: Margravine Sophie Elisabeth; Margravine Albertine Luise; Margravine Sophie Amalie; Margravine Luise Sophie; John Frederick, Margrave of Brandenburg-Ansbach; Margrave Albrecht Ernst; Dorothea Charlotte, Landgravine of Hesse-Darmstadt; Eleonore Juliane, Duchess of Württemberg-Winnental
- House: Hohenzollern
- Father: Joachim Ernst, Margrave of Brandenburg-Ansbach
- Mother: Countess Sophie of Solms-Laubach

Albert II or V of Brandenburg-Ansbach (18 September 1620 – 22 October 1667) was a German prince, who was Margrave of Ansbach from 1634 until his death.

== Life ==
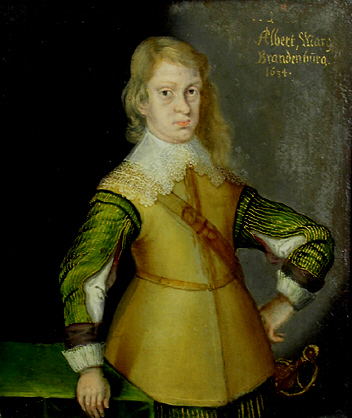
Albert in a miniature of 1634

Born in Ansbach, Albert was the second son of Joachim Ernst, Margrave of Brandenburg-Ansbach and his wife Sophie, daughter of John George, Count of Solms-Laubach. On Joachim Ernst's death Albert's elder brother Frederick III succeeded him in Ansbach from 1625 onwards, initially under their mother's guardianship, but he was killed without issue in the Thirty Years' War in 1634. Albert thus succeeded him, though again the early years of his rule were under his mother's guardianship, only taking up full government responsibilities when his minority ended in 1639.

With much diplomatic skill, he manoeuvred Brandenburg-Ansbach through the last ten years of the war and through administrative reforms, support for the guilds and cultural life and a good credit policy he promoted the beginnings of post-war reconstruction. He offered refuge to religious refugees from Austria and in 1647 or 1662 granted them lands in Treuchtlingen and Berolzheim. Albert's main advisor on this was his former teacher Johannes Limnäus. Active in the politics of the Holy Roman Empire, he sent troops to back the war against the Ottoman Empire.

A typical Baroque absolute ruler, he died at Ansbach in 1667. He was buried in the Johanniskirche in that city.

== Marriage and issue ==
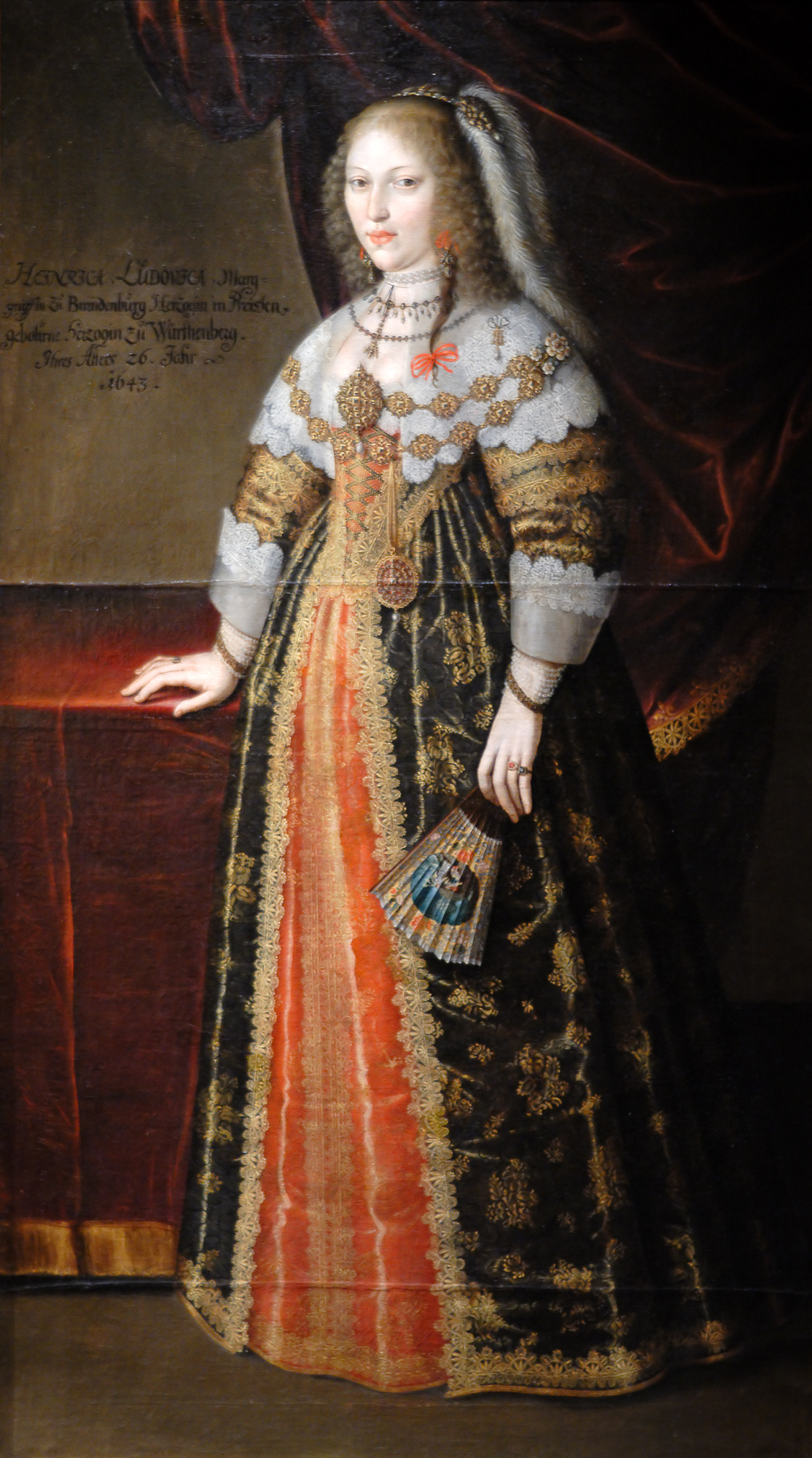
Albert's first wife, Henriette Louise of Württemberg-Mömpelgard, in a painting by Benjamin Block, 1643

In Stuttgart on 31 August 1642 he married Henriette Louise (1623–1650), daughter of Louis Frederick, Duke of Württemberg-Montbéliard, with the following children:

- Sophie Elisabeth (*/†1643)
- Albertine Luise (1646–1670)
- Sophie Amalie (*/† 1649)

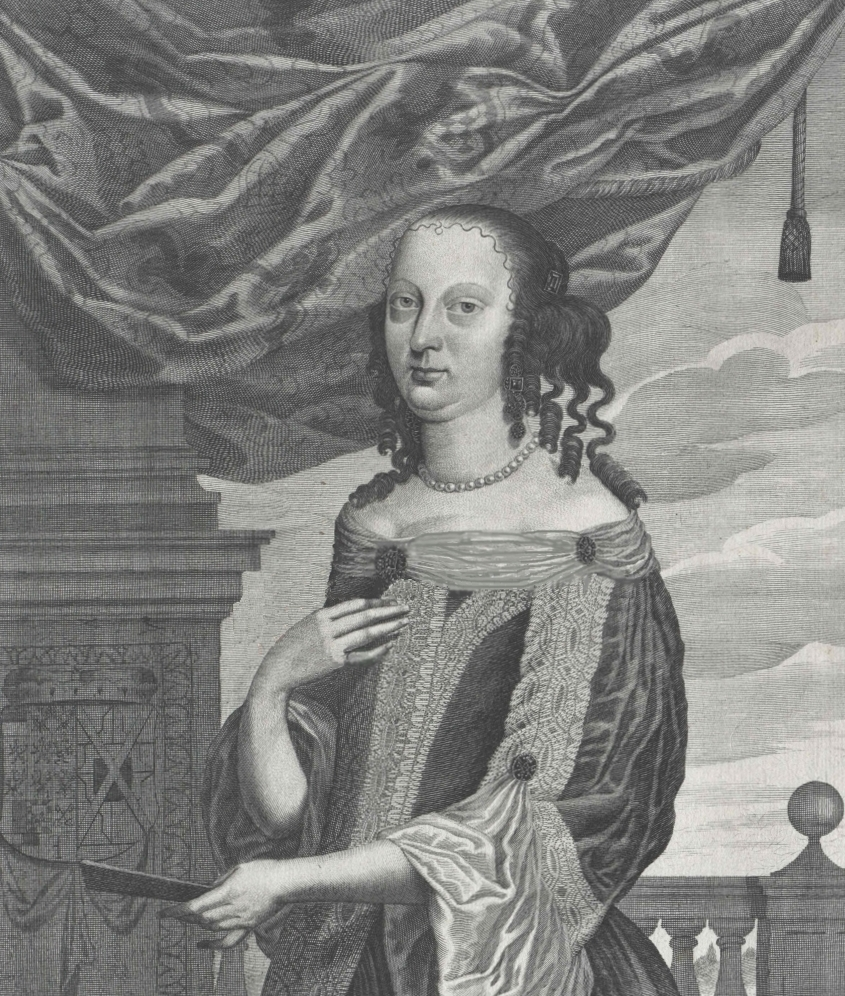
Albert's second wife, Sophie Margarete of Oettingen-Oettingen

He married for a second time on 15 October 1651 at Oettingen, to Sophie Margarete (1634–1664), daughter of Joachim Ernst, Count of Oettingen-Oettingen, with the following children:

- Luise Sophie (1652–1668)
- John Frederick, Margrave of Brandenburg-Ansbach (1654–1686)

∞ 1. 1673 Princess Johanna Elisabeth of Baden-Durlach (1651–1680)
∞ 2. 1681 Princess Eleonore of Sachsen-Eisenach (1662–1696)

- Albrecht Ernst (1659–1674)
- Dorothea Charlotte (1661–1705)

∞ 1687 Ernest Louis, Landgrave of Hesse-Darmstadt (1667–1739)

- Eleonore Juliane (1663–1724)

∞ 1682 Frederick Charles, Duke of Württemberg-Winnental (1652–1698)

He married for a third time on 6 August 1665 in Durlach, to Christine (1645–1705), daughter of Frederick VI, Margrave of Baden-Durlach. This marriage was childless.

== Ancestors ==
Ancestors of Albert II of Brandenburg-Ansbach

16. Joachim I Nestor, Elector of Brandenburg
8. Joachim II Hector, Elector of Brandenburg
17. Elizabeth of Denmark, Norway, and Sweden
4. John George, Elector of Brandenburg
18. George, Duke of Saxony
9. Magdalena of Saxony
19. Barbara Jagiellon
2. Joachim Ernst, Margrave of Brandenburg-Ansbach
20. John V, Prince of Anhalt-Zerbst
10. Joachim Ernest, Prince of Anhalt
21. Margaret of Brandenburg (1511–1577)
5. Elisabeth of Anhalt-Zerbst
22. Wolfgang I, Count of Barby-Mühlingen
11. Agnes of Barby-Mühlingen
23. Agnes of Mansfeld
1. Albert II, Margrave of Brandenburg-Ansbach
24. Otto of Solms-Laubach
12. Frederick Magnus I, Count of Solms-Laubach
25. Anna of Mecklenburg-Schwerin
6. John George I of Solms-Laubach
26. John III, Count of Wied
13. Agnes of Wied
27. Elisabeth of Nassau-Dillenburg
3. Sophie of Solms-Laubach
28. Ernest III of Schönburg-Waldenburg
14. George II of Schönburg-Glauchau
29. Amalia of Leisnig
7. Margaret of Schönburg-Glauchau
30. Henry XIII of Reuss-Plauen-Greiz
15. Dorothea of Reuss-Plauen
31. Amalia of Mansfeld-Vorderort

== Sources ==
- (in German) Hanns Hubert Hofmann: Albrecht V.. In: Neue Deutsche Biographie (NDB). Band 1, Duncker & Humblot, Berlin 1953, S. 163 f. (Onlinefassung)
- (in German) M. Spindler, A. Kraus: Geschichte Frankens bis zum Ausgang des 18. Jahrhunderts, München 1997. ISBN 3-406-39451-5

Albert II of Brandenburg-Ansbach House of Hohenzollern Born: 18 September 1620 Died: 22 October 1667
Preceded by Frederick III	Margrave of Brandenburg-Ansbach; 1634–1667	Succeeded by John Frederick
