= Alexander, Margrave of Brandenburg-Ansbach =

Margrave of Brandenburg-Ansbach and Brandenburg-Bayreuth

Christian Friedrich Carl Alexander
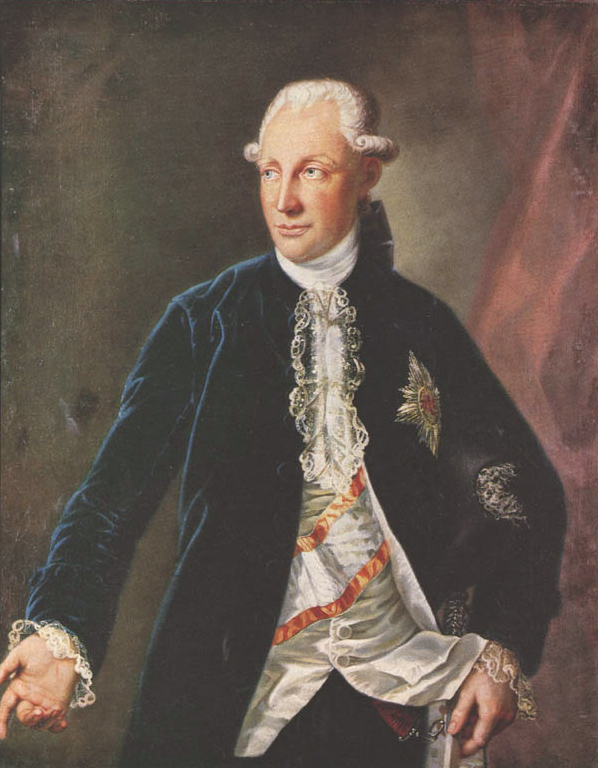
- Born: 24 February 1736; Ansbach
- Died: 5 January 1806 (aged 69); Benham Park, Speen, Berkshire, England
- Spouse: Princess Frederica Caroline of Saxe-Coburg-Saalfeld (m. 1754; died 1791) Elizabeth Craven, Baroness Craven (m. 1791)
- House: Hohenzollern
- Father: Charles William Frederick, Margrave of Brandenburg-Ansbach
- Mother: Princess Friederike Luise of Prussia

Christian Frederick Charles Alexander (German: Christian Friedrich Carl Alexander; 24 February 1736 – 5 January 1806) was the last margrave of the two Franconian principalities, Bayreuth and Ansbach, (Note: He was Margrave in name only, as Ansbach and Bayreuth were Markgraftümer rather than Markgrafschäfte proper (i.e., titles rather than sovereign realms within the Holy Roman Empire).) which he sold to the King of Prussia, a fellow member of the House of Hohenzollern.

== Life ==
His parents were Charles William Frederick, Margrave of Brandenburg-Ansbach, and Friederike Luise of Prussia, daughter of King Frederick William I of Prussia, sister of Frederick II of Prussia, a granddaughter of the British King George I and niece of the reigning British King George II (who would die aged 76 and leave his grandson, Charles's second cousin, as King George III, when Charles was 24).

After the sudden death of his elder brother Carl Frederick August on 9 May 1737, "Alexander", as he later called himself, became Crown Prince of the principality. From 1748 to 1759, he studied at Utrecht. As the young "Count of Sayn" (the county of Sayn-Altenkirchen in the Westerwald having been absorbed into the Principality of Ansbach in 1741) he travelled to Turin and Savoy. (Note: It has been speculated that he became infected with syphilis on this journey, given that he remained childless despite two marriages and several other relationships.)

On 22 November 1754, in Coburg, Alexander married Princess Frederica Caroline of Saxe-Coburg-Saalfeld (1735–1791), daughter of Franz Josias, Duke of Saxe-Coburg-Saalfeld, and Anne Sophia, Princess of Schwarzburg-Rudolstadt.

On 3 August 1757, Alexander became the Margrave of Brandenburg-Ansbach. The Residenz of the principality was at Ansbach, but Alexander preferred his hunting estate and country seat in Triesdorf. Here, he renovated the "White Castle" for his mistress Hippolyte Clairon, the "Red Castle" for himself, and built the Villa Sandrina for another mistress, "Fräulein Kurz", and the "Round Villa" (Villa Rotunda) for his mistress (and later wife) Elizabeth, Baroness Craven.

In 1758, Alexander founded the porcelain factory in Ansbach and made ventures into agriculture by importing sheep. In 1769, he acquired the principality of Bayreuth pursuant to the Haus- und Reichsgesetze laws of the House of Hohenzollern.

In 1780, Alexander founded his own bank, the Hochfürstlich-Brandenburg-Anspach-Bayreuthische Hofbanco, out of which later came the Bayerische Hypotheken- und Wechselbank ("Bavarian Mortgage and Change Bank", today absorbed into the HypoVereinsbank). He evidently wanted to avoid supporting the Jewish banking houses that were then overseeing his financial affairs, and to keep as much of his revenue as possible in his own hands by setting himself up as a private banker.

=== American Revolutionary War ===
One of Alexander's enterprises earned income from hiring auxiliary troops to King George III of Great Britain for the American Revolutionary War. He had nominal command over the "Frankish Army" of 1,644 mercenaries, of whom only some 1,183 returned to their homeland in 1783. The Margrave leased further troops to Holland. With these incomes, he paid down the principality's debts, which amounted to 5,000,000 guilders at the time he inherited the throne (1757). By the time of his abdication 34 years later, the principality's debt stood at only 1,500,000 guilders.

=== End of the Margraviate ===
	Ansbach	Bayreuth
1792	Prussia	Prussia
1805	France	↓
1806	Bavaria	↓
1807	↓	France
1810	↓	Bavaria
...	↓	↓
1871	Germany	Germany

On 16 January 1791, Alexander sold his Margraviate to Prussia. The contract was arranged by Karl August von Hardenberg, who had been Acting Minister in Ansbach since 1790. Under the terms of the contract, Prussia paid the Margrave as compensation an annual stipend of 300,000 guilders. On 2 December, in Bordeaux he signed his formal abdication as margrave.

=== After abdication ===
Alexander's first wife, Frederica Caroline, died on 18 February 1791 in Unterschwaningen, where she had lived since separating from her husband. On 19 May of the same year, Alexander left Triesdorf for England. On 13 October or 30 October 1791, in Lisbon, Alexander married Elizabeth Craven, Baroness Craven (1750–1828), the daughter of the Earl of Berkeley and the widow of the William Craven, 6th Baron Craven, who had died shortly before.

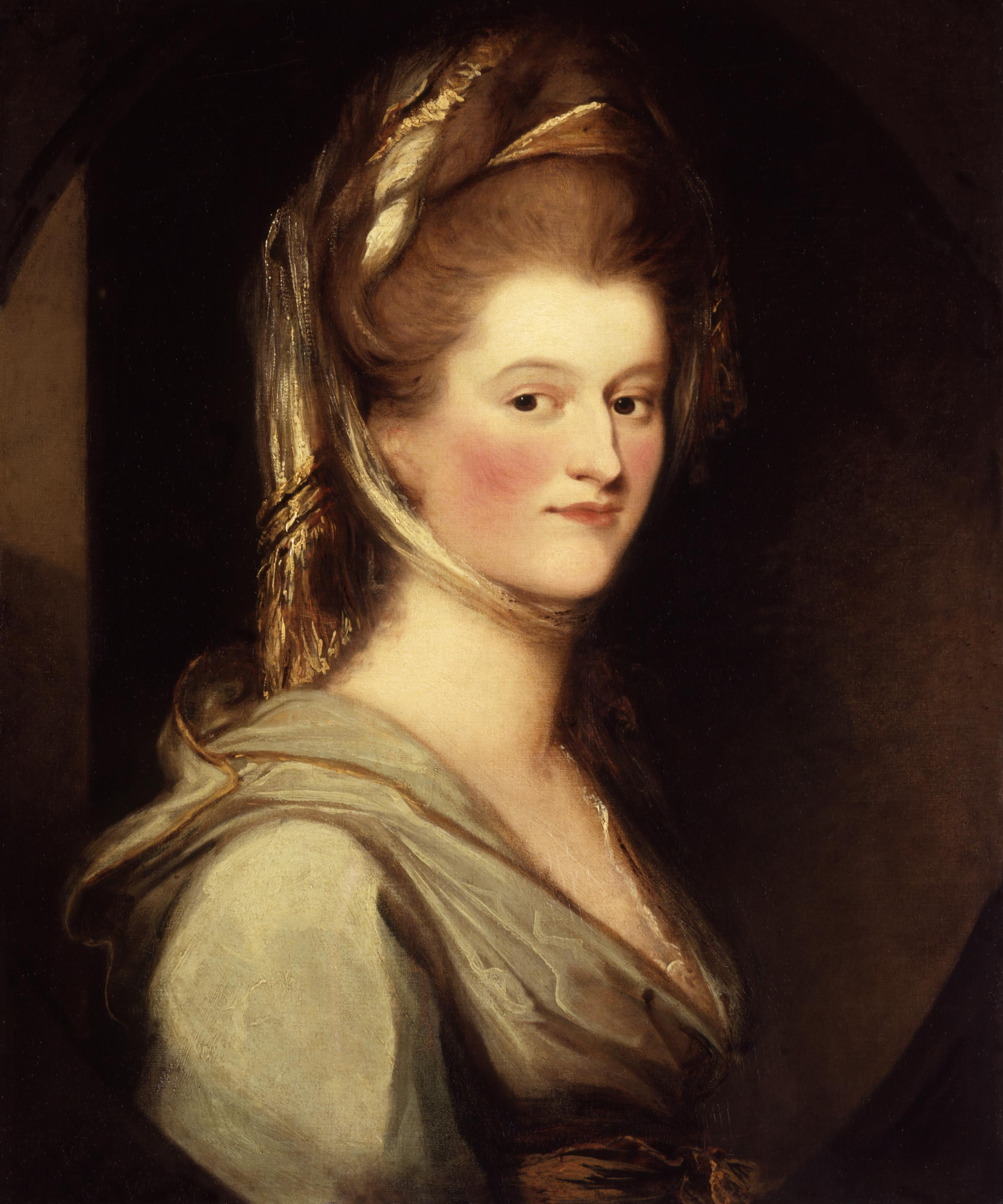
Alexander's second wife Elizabeth, Lady Craven

Alexander sailed to England as a private citizen with his new wife, and there the couple dedicated themselves to breeding horses. By December 1791, he had found a property near the River Thames, Brandenburgh House at Fulham, and in 1798, he acquired the Benham Park estate at Speen near Newbury in Berkshire. On 5 January 1806, aged 69, Alexander died after a short illness caused by lung disease. Today, a memorial in St Mary's Church in Speen, simply records "In Memory of the Margrave of Anspach, who died at Benham 5th January 1806".

The Franconian region over which Alexander had ruled changed hands many times. On 15 December 1805, in the first Treaty of Schönbrunn, Prussia ceded the Principality of Ansbach to France in exchange for the Electorate of Hanover; in 1806, Ansbach was acquired by the Kingdom of Bavaria in exchange for the Duchy of Berg, and soon afterwards the Prussian defeat at Jena on 14 October 1806 resulted in the Principality of Bayreuth also being ceded to the French in the Treaty of Tilsit of July 1807. In 1810, Bayreuth was acquired by Bavaria. In 1871, Bavaria became part of the new German Empire under the King of Prussia, but retained its internal independence, and it continues as a Land of the present-day Germany.

=== Arms ===
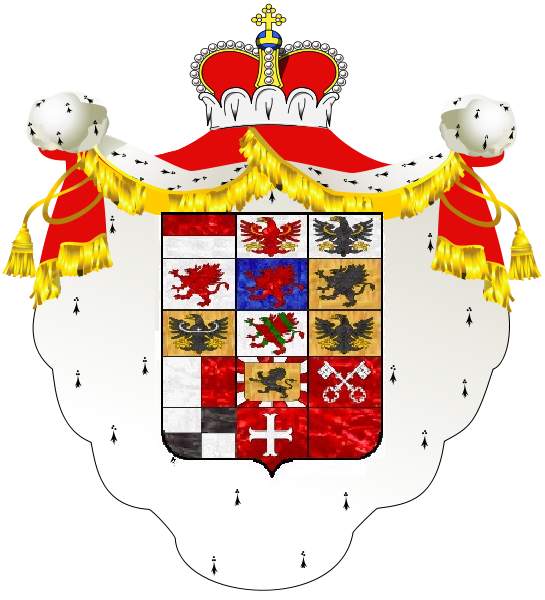
Coat of arms

== Ancestors ==
Ancestors of Alexander, Margrave of Brandenburg-Ansbach

John Frederick, Margrave of Brandenburg-Ansbach
William Frederick, Margrave of Brandenburg-Ansbach
Princess Eleonore Erdmuthe of Saxe-Eisenach
Charles William Frederick, Margrave of Brandenburg-Ansbach
Frederick Charles, Duke of Württemberg-Winnental
Duchess Christiane Charlotte of Württemberg
Princess Eleonore Juliane of Brandenburg-Ansbach
Alexander, Margrave of Brandenburg-Ansbach
Frederick I of Prussia
Frederick William I of Prussia
Princess Sophia Charlotte of Hanover
Princess Friederike Luise of Prussia
George I of Great Britain
Sophia Dorothea of Hanover
Duchess Sophia Dorothea of Brunswick-Celle

== See also ==
- Ansbach-Bayreuth in the American Revolution

== Bibliography ==
- McNaughton, C. Arnold (1973). The Book of Kings: A Royal Genealogy. Vol. 1. London: Garnstone Press. p. 79.
- Taddey, Gerhard (1998). Lexikon der deutschen Geschichte. Stuttgart. ISBN 3-520-81303-3.
- Spindler, M.; Kraus, A. (1997). Geschichte Frankens bis zum Ausgang des 18. Jahrhunderts. München. ISBN 3-406-39451-5.
- Störkel, Arno (1995). Christian Friedrich Carl Alexander: Der letzte Markgraf von Ansbach-Bayreuth. Ansbach. ISBN 3-925649-02-6.

Alexander, Margrave of Brandenburg-Ansbach House of Hohenzollern Born: 24 February 1736 Died: 5 January 1806
Regnal titles
Preceded by Carl William Frederick	Margrave of Brandenburg-Ansbach; 1757–1791	Succeeded by none
Preceded by Frederick Christian	Margrave of Brandenburg-Bayreuth; 1769–1791	Succeeded by none
