= Charles William Frederick, Margrave of Brandenburg-Ansbach =

Charles William Frederick
- Margrave of Brandenburg-Ansbach
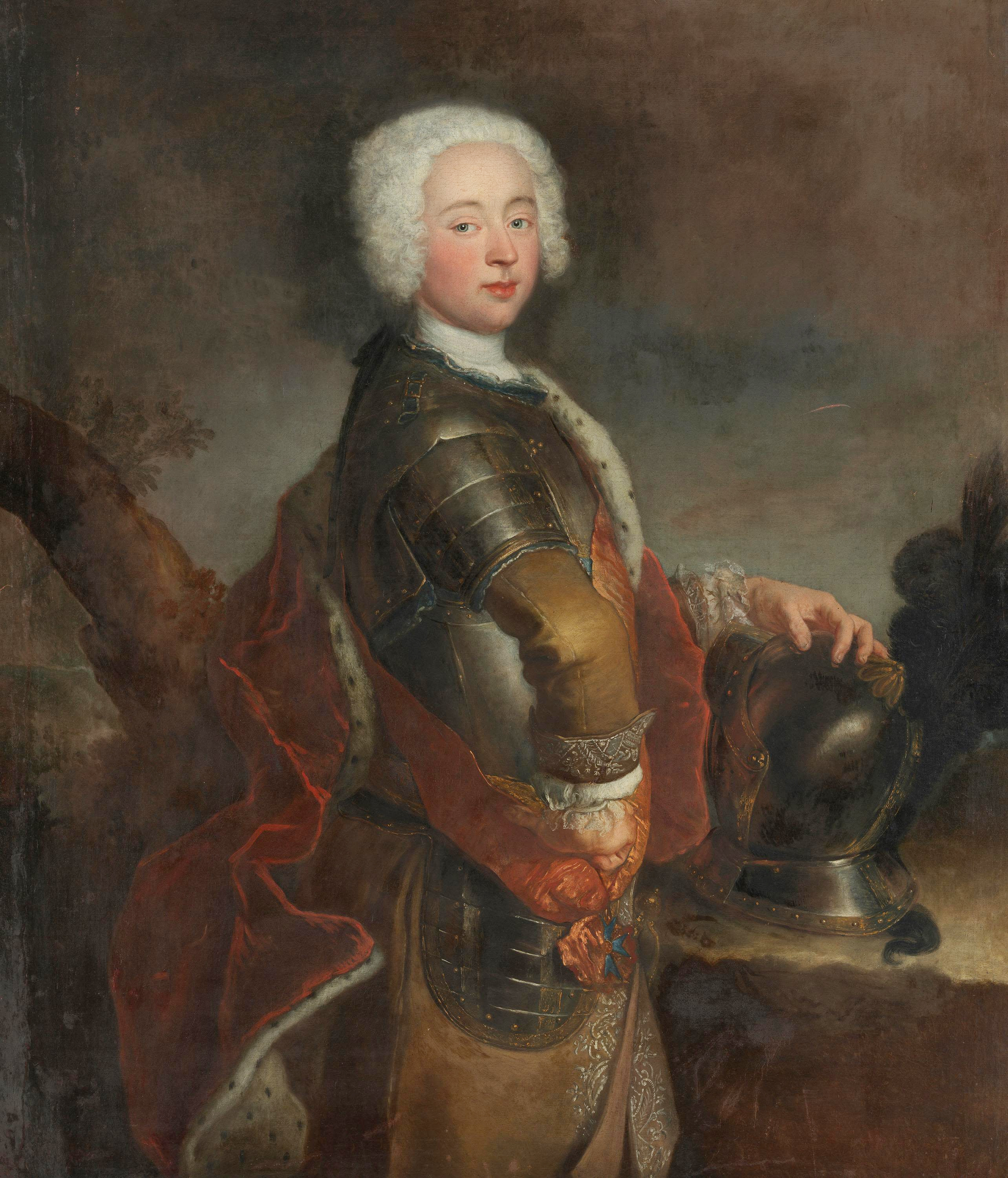
- Portrat of Charles William Frederick by Antoine Pesne, c. 1731
- Born: 12 May 1712; Ansbach
- Died: 3 August 1757 (aged 45); Gunzenhausen
- Spouse: Princess Friederike Luise of Prussia (m. 1729)
- Issue: Charles, Hereditary Prince of Brandenburg-Ansbach; Charles Alexander, Margrave of Brandenburg-Ansbach
- House: Hohenzollern
- Father: William Frederick, Margrave of Brandenburg-Ansbach
- Mother: Duchess Christiane Charlotte of Württemberg

Charles William Frederick (German: Karl Wilhelm Friedrich; 12 May 1712 – 3 August 1757), nicknamed der Wilde Markgraf (the Wild Margrave), was the margrave of the Principality of Ansbach from 1723 to his death.

== Early life ==
Charles William Frederick was the son of William Frederick, Margrave of Brandenburg-Ansbach (1686–1723) and his wife Duchess Christiane Charlotte of Württemberg (1694–1729). During his youth, his mother ruled as regent.

== Biography ==
When he came to power, Charles William Frederick ruled as a typical absolute monarch with a luxurious court life. He left his heir Charles Alexander a total debt of 2.3 million Reichsthaler, and he spent 10% of the state budget on hunting. He had 56 churches and many palaces built, among them a building in Triesdorf for his falcons, his greatest passion, on which he spent more than a half million guilders between 1730 and 1748. His love of hunting, particularly with his falcons, is what earned him his nickname, the Wild Margrave.

Charles William Frederick died of a stroke on 3 August 1757.

== Marriage and children ==
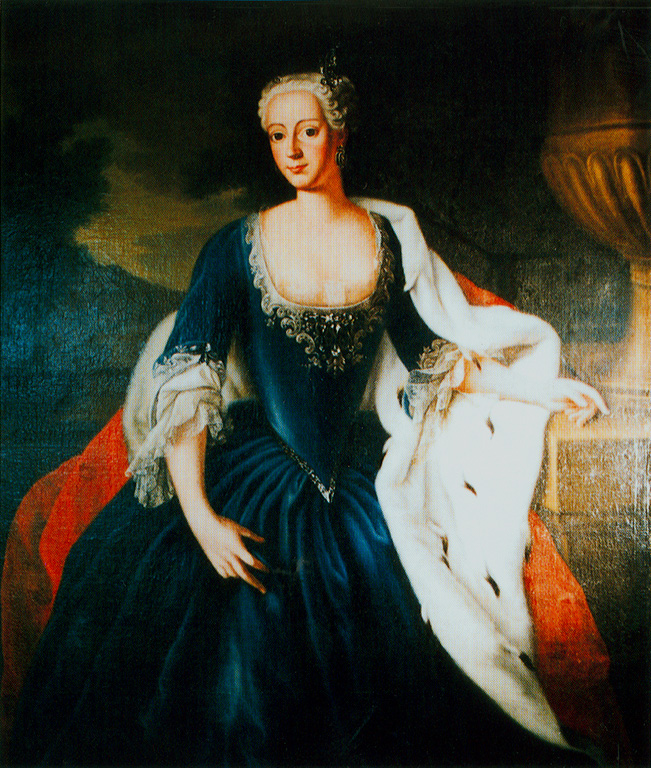
Friederike Luise of Prussia

Charles William Frederick married Princess Friederike Luise of Prussia (1714–1784), sixth child and second surviving daughter of King Frederick William I of Prussia and his wife, Princess Sophia Dorothea of Hanover.

They had two children:

- Charles Frederick Augustus (7 April 1733 – 9 May 1737)
- Charles Alexander, Margrave of Brandenburg-Ansbach (24 February 1736 – 5 January 1806)

He also had four children with his mistress Elisabeth Wünsch (1710-1757), a falconer's daughter. Both illegitimate sons, Friedrich Karl (1734–1796) and Friedrich Ferdinand Ludwig (1748–1811), and daughters Wilhelmine Eleonore (1743–1768) and Louise Charlotte (1746–1747) all married into the German nobility and received palaces and the hereditary titles Freiherren and Freiinen von Falkenhausen.

== Ancestors ==
Ancestors of Charles William Frederick, Margrave of Brandenburg-Ansbach

16. Joachim Ernst, Margrave of Brandenburg-Ansbach (1583–1625)
8. Albert II, Margrave of Brandenburg-Ansbach (1620–1667)
17. Sophie of Solms-Laubach (1594–1651)
4. John Frederick, Margrave of Brandenburg-Ansbach (1654–1686)
18. Joachim Ernest, Count of Oettingen-Oettingen (1612–1659)
9. Sophie Margarete of Oettingen-Oettingen (1634–1664)
19. Anna Sophie of Palatinate-Sulzbach (1621–1675)
2. William Frederick, Margrave of Brandenburg-Ansbach (1686–1723)
20. Wilhelm, Duke of Saxe-Weimar (1598–1662)
10. John George I, Duke of Saxe-Eisenach (1634–1686)
21. Eleonore Dorothea of Anhalt-Dessau (1602–1664)
5. Princess Eleonore Erdmuthe of Saxe-Eisenach (1662–1696)
22. Ernest of Sayn-Wittgenstein (1594–1632)
11. Johannetta, Countess of Sayn-Altenkirchen (1626–1701)
23. Louise Juliane of Erbach (1603–1670)
1. Charles William Frederick, Margrave of Brandenburg-Ansbach
24. John Frederick, Duke of Württemberg (1582–1628)
12. Eberhard III, Duke of Württemberg (1614–1674)
25. Barbara Sophie of Brandenburg (1584–1636)
6. Frederick Charles, Duke of Württemberg-Winnental (1652–1697)
26. John Casimir of Salm-Kyrburg (1577–1651)
13. Anna Catharina of Salm-Kyrburg (1614–1655)
27. Dorothea of Solms-Laubach (1579–1631)
3. Christiane Charlotte of Württemberg-Winnental (1694–1729)
28. Joachim Ernst, Margrave of Brandenburg-Ansbach (1583–1625) (= 16)
14. Albert II, Margrave of Brandenburg-Ansbach (1620–1667) (= 8)
29. Sophie of Solms-Laubach (1594–1651) (= 17)
7. Margravine Eleonore Juliane of Brandenburg-Ansbach (1663–1724)
30. Joachim Ernest, Count of Oettingen-Oettingen (1612–1659) (= 18)
15. Sophie Margarete of Oettingen-Oettingen (1634–1664) (= 9)
31. Anna Sophie of Palatinate-Sulzbach (1621–1675) (= 19)

Charles William Frederick, Margrave of Brandenburg-Ansbach House of Hohenzollern Born: 12 May 1712 Died: 3 August 1757
Preceded by William Frederick	Margrave of Brandenburg-Ansbach; 1723–1757	Succeeded by Charles Alexander
