= Caroline of Ansbach =

Queen of Great Britain and Ireland from 1727 to 1737

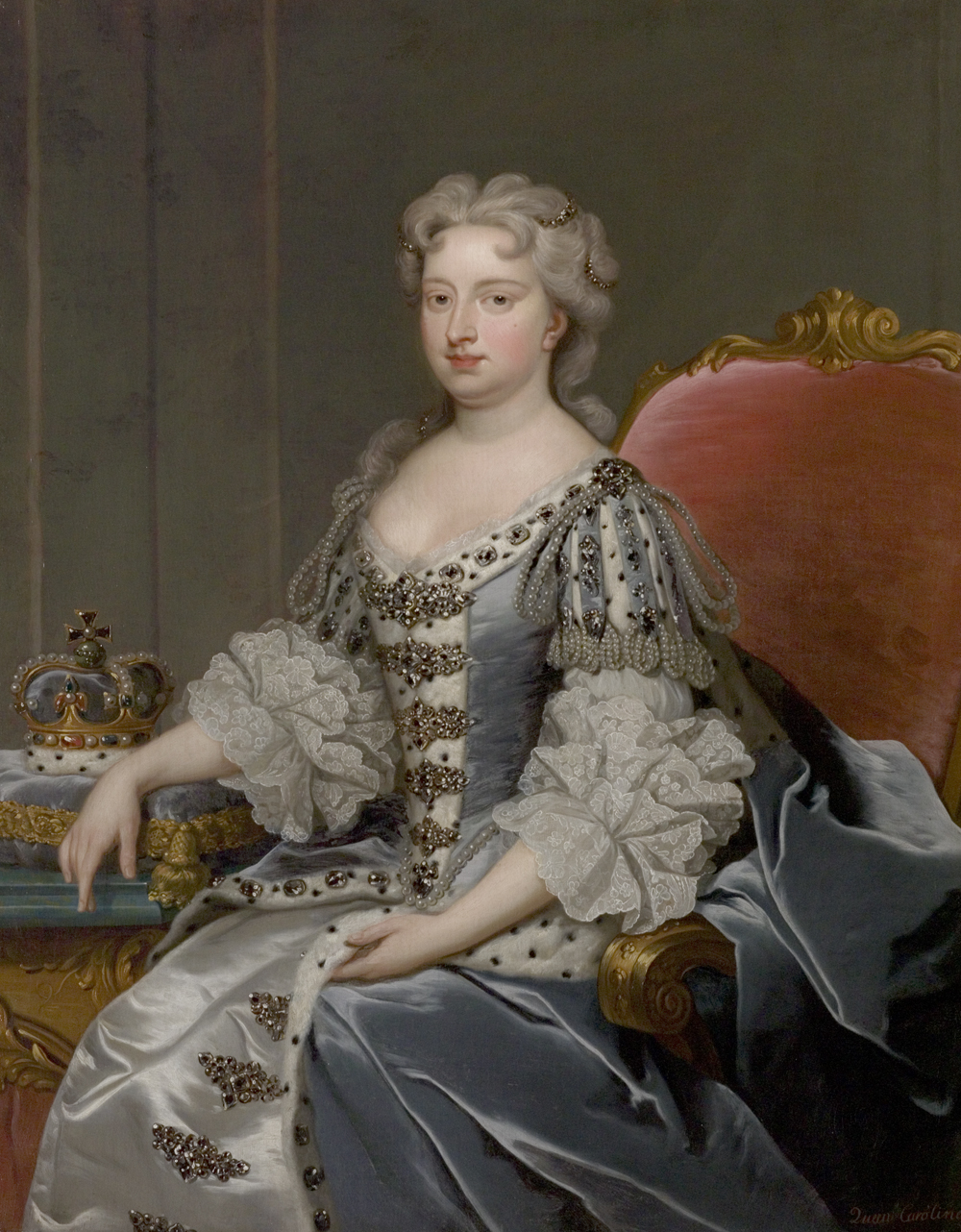
- Portrait c. 1730

Queen consort of Great Britain and Ireland; Electress consort of Hanover
- Tenure: 11 June 1727 – 20 November 1737 (Note: Over the course of Caroline's life, two date systems were used: Old Style and New Style. Hanover switched from the Julian to the Gregorian calendar on 19 February (Old Style) / 1 March (New Style) 1700. Great Britain switched on 3/14 September 1752, after Caroline's death. Unless otherwise indicated, dates before September 1752 are Old Style. All dates after September 1752 are New Style. All years are assumed to start from 1 January and not 25 March, which was the English New Year.)
- Coronation: 11 October 1727
- Born: 1 March 1683; Ansbach Residence, Principality of Ansbach, Holy Roman Empire
- Died: 20 November 1737 (aged 54); St James's Palace, London, Great Britain
- Burial: 17 December 1737; Westminster Abbey, London
- Spouse: George II of Great Britain (m. 1705)
- Issue: Frederick, Prince of Wales; Anne, Princess Royal and Princess of Orange; Princess Amelia; Princess Caroline; Prince George William; Prince William, Duke of Cumberland; Mary, Landgravine of Hesse-Kassel; Louisa, Queen of Denmark and Norway
Names
- Wilhelmina Charlotte Caroline; German: Wilhelmine Charlotte Karoline
- House: Hohenzollern
- Father: John Frederick, Margrave of Brandenburg-Ansbach
- Mother: Princess Eleonore Erdmuthe of Saxe-Eisenach

Caroline of Brandenburg-Ansbach (Wilhelmina Charlotte Caroline; 1 March 1683 – 20 November 1737) was Queen of Great Britain and Ireland and Electress of Hanover from 11 June 1727 (O.S.) until her death in 1737 as the wife of King George II.

Caroline's father, Margrave John Frederick of Brandenburg-Ansbach, belonged to a branch of the House of Hohenzollern and was the ruler of a small German state, the Principality of Ansbach. After Caroline was orphaned at a young age, she moved to the enlightened court of her guardians, King Frederick I and Queen Sophia Charlotte of Prussia. At the Prussian court, her previously limited education was widened and she adopted the liberal outlook possessed by Sophia Charlotte, who became her good friend and whose views influenced Caroline all her life.

When she was a young woman, Caroline was much sought after as a bride. After rejecting the suit of Archduke Charles of Austria, a claimant to the Spanish throne, she married George Augustus, who was third in line to the English throne (and subsequently the British throne) and heir apparent to the Electorate of Hanover. They had eight children, seven of whom reached adulthood. Caroline moved to Britain permanently in 1714 when her husband became Prince of Wales. As Princess of Wales, she joined George Augustus in rallying political opposition to his father, King George I. In 1717, after a family row, George Augustus was expelled from court. Caroline came to be associated with Robert Walpole, an opposition politician who was a former government minister. Walpole rejoined the government in 1720, and George Augustus reconciled publicly with his father on Walpole's advice. Over the next few years, Walpole rose to become the leading minister.

Upon her husband's accession in 1727, Caroline became queen and electress, and her eldest son, Frederick, became Prince of Wales. He was a focus for the opposition, like his father before him, and Caroline's relationship with him was strained. As princess and as queen, Caroline was known for her political influence, which she exercised both through and for Walpole. Her tenure included four regencies, which occurred during George II's stays in Hanover; she is credited with strengthening the House of Hanover's place in Britain during a period of political instability. After her death in 1737, Caroline was widely mourned by her political allies as well as by the King, who refused to remarry.

== Early life ==
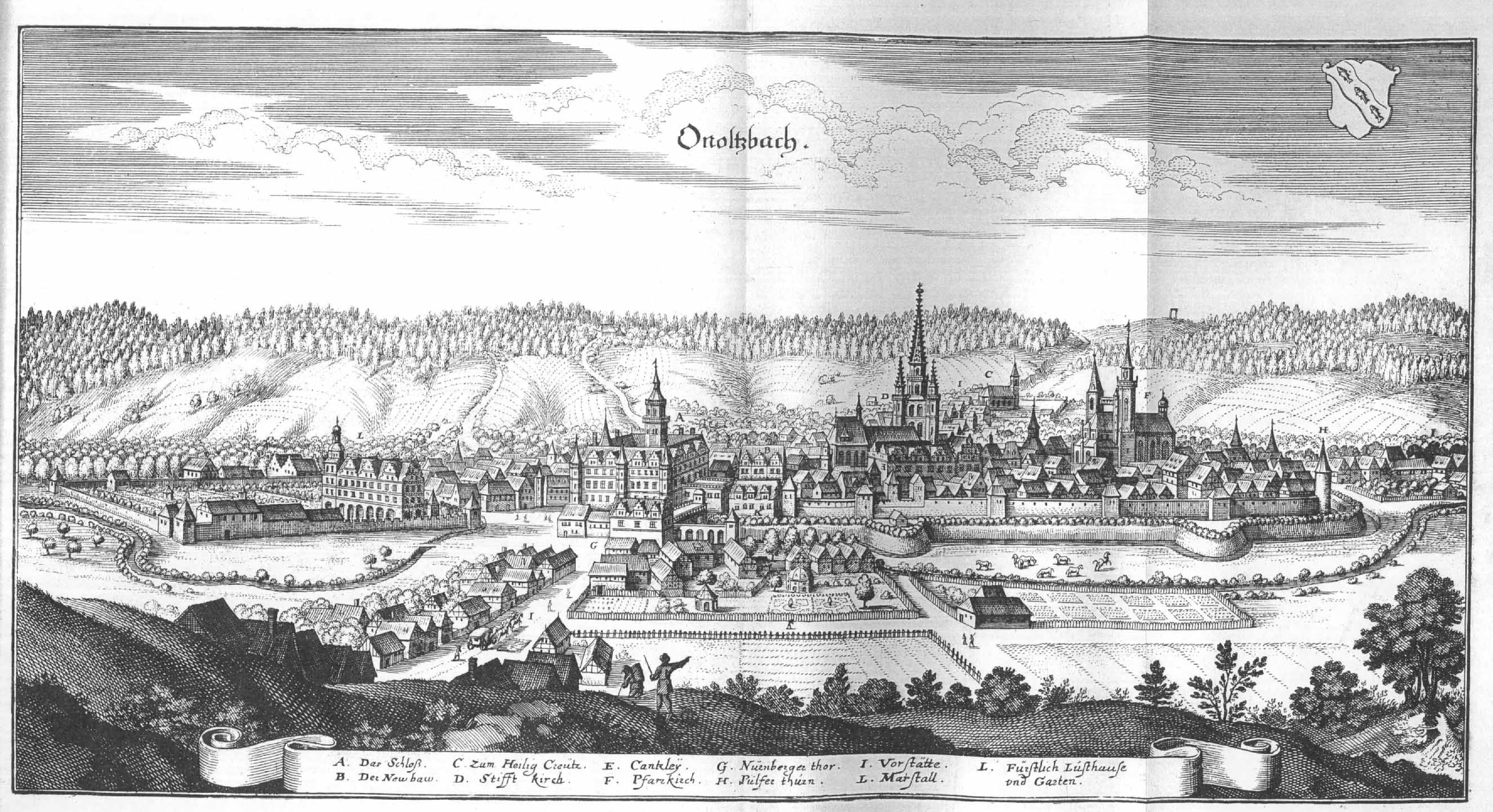
Ansbach in the 17th century

Caroline was born on 1 March 1683 in Ansbach, the daughter of John Frederick, Margrave of Brandenburg-Ansbach, and his second wife, Princess Eleonore Erdmuthe of Saxe-Eisenach. Her father was the ruler of one of the smallest German states; he died of smallpox at the age of 31, when Caroline was three years old. Caroline and her only full sibling, her younger brother Margrave William Frederick, left Ansbach with their mother, who returned to her native Eisenach. In 1692, Caroline's widowed mother was pushed into an unhappy marriage with John George IV, Elector of Saxony, and she and her two children moved to the Saxon court at Dresden. Eleonore Erdmuthe was widowed again two years later, after her unfaithful husband contracted smallpox from his mistress. Eleonore remained in Saxony for another two years, until her death in 1696. The orphaned Caroline and William Frederick returned to Ansbach to stay with their elder half-brother, Margrave George Frederick II. George Frederick was a youth with little interest in parenting a girl, and so Caroline soon moved to Lützenburg outside Berlin, where she entered into the care of her new guardians, Frederick III, Elector of Brandenburg, and his wife, Sophia Charlotte, who had been a friend of Eleonore Erdmuthe.

=== Education ===
Frederick and Sophia Charlotte became king and queen of Prussia in 1701. The Queen was the daughter of Sophia, Dowager Electress of Hanover, and the sister of George, Elector of Hanover. She was renowned for her intelligence and strong character, and her uncensored and liberal court attracted a great many scholars, including philosopher Gottfried Leibniz. Caroline was exposed to a lively intellectual environment quite different from anything she had experienced previously. Before she began her education under Sophia Charlotte's care, Caroline had received little formal education; her handwriting remained poor throughout her life. With her lively mind, Caroline developed into a scholar of considerable ability. She and Sophia Charlotte developed a strong relationship in which Caroline was treated as a surrogate daughter; the Queen once declared Berlin was "a desert" without Caroline whenever she left temporarily for Ansbach.

== Marriage ==
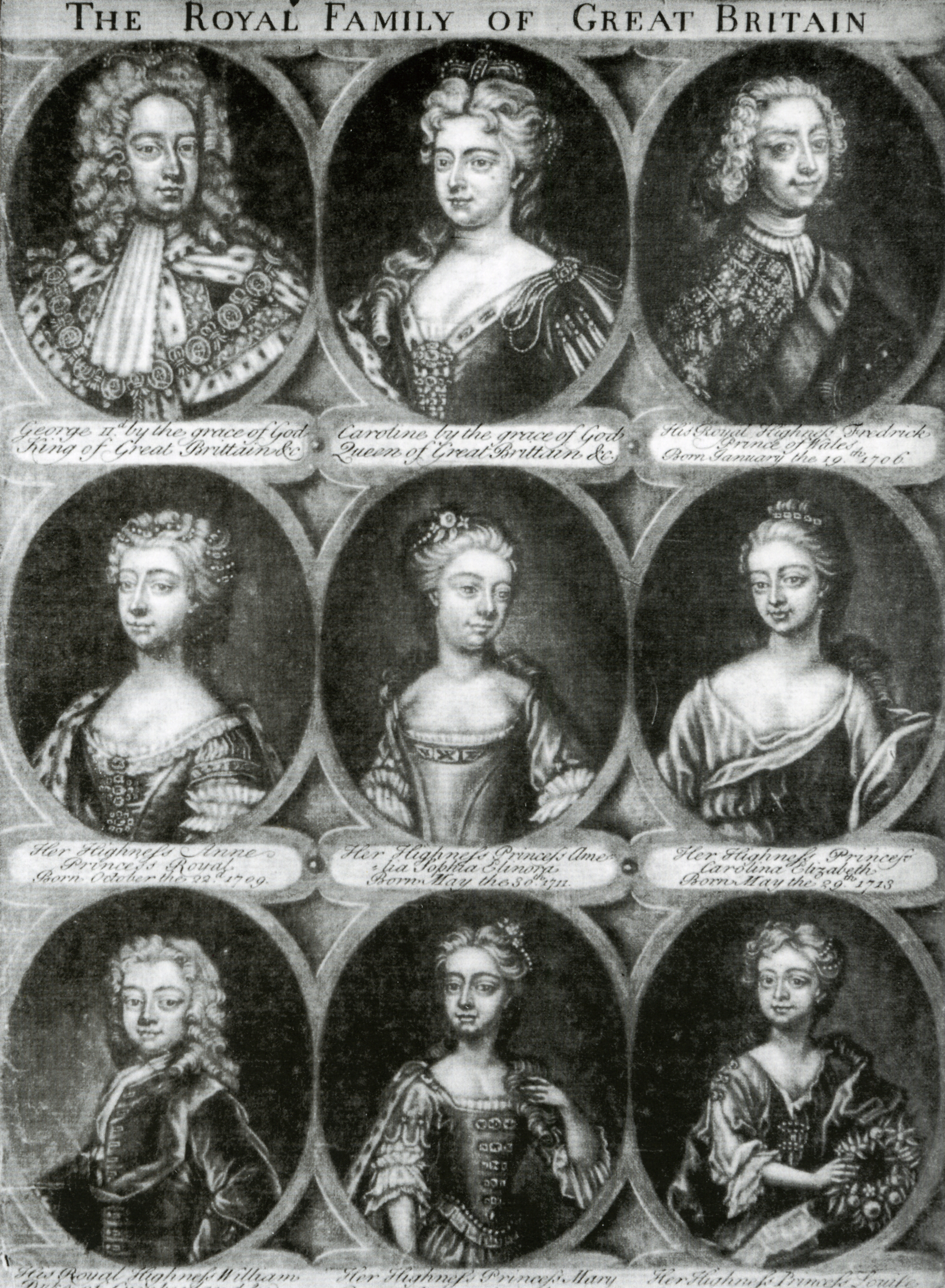
Engraving of the royal couple and their seven children who survived infancy

An intelligent and attractive woman, Caroline was much sought after as a bride. Dowager Electress Sophia and British diplomat Edmund Poley both called her "the most agreeable Princess in Germany". She was considered for the hand of Archduke Charles of Austria, who was a candidate for the throne of Spain and later became Holy Roman Emperor. Charles made official overtures to her in 1703, and the match was encouraged by the Prussian king. After some consideration, Caroline refused in 1704, as she would not convert from Lutheranism to Catholicism. Early in the following year, Queen Sophia Charlotte died on a visit to her native Hanover. Caroline was devastated, writing to Leibniz, "The calamity has overwhelmed me with grief and sickness, and it is only the hope that I may soon follow her that consoles me."

In June 1705, Sophia Charlotte's nephew Prince George Augustus of Hanover visited the Ansbach court, supposedly incognito, to inspect Caroline, as his father the Elector did not want his son to enter into a loveless arranged marriage as he himself had. The nephew of three childless uncles, George Augustus was under pressure to marry and father an heir to prevent endangering the Hanoverian succession. He had heard reports of Caroline's "incomparable beauty and mental attributes". He immediately took a liking to her "good character" and the British envoy reported that George Augustus "would not think of anybody else after her". For her part, Caroline was not fooled by the prince's disguise, and found her suitor attractive. He was the heir apparent of his father's Electorate of Hanover and third-in-line to the English throne, then held by his distant cousin Queen Anne, after his grandmother Dowager Electress Sophia and his father the Elector.

On 22 August 1705, Caroline arrived in Hanover for her wedding to George Augustus; they were married that evening in the chapel at Herrenhausen Palace. By May of the following year, Caroline was pregnant, and her first child Prince Frederick was born on 20 January 1707. A few months after the birth, in July, Caroline fell seriously ill with smallpox followed by pneumonia. Her baby was kept away from her, but George Augustus remained devotedly at her side, catching the infection himself. They both survived. Over the next seven years, Caroline had three more children, Anne, Amelia, and Caroline, all of whom were born in Hanover.

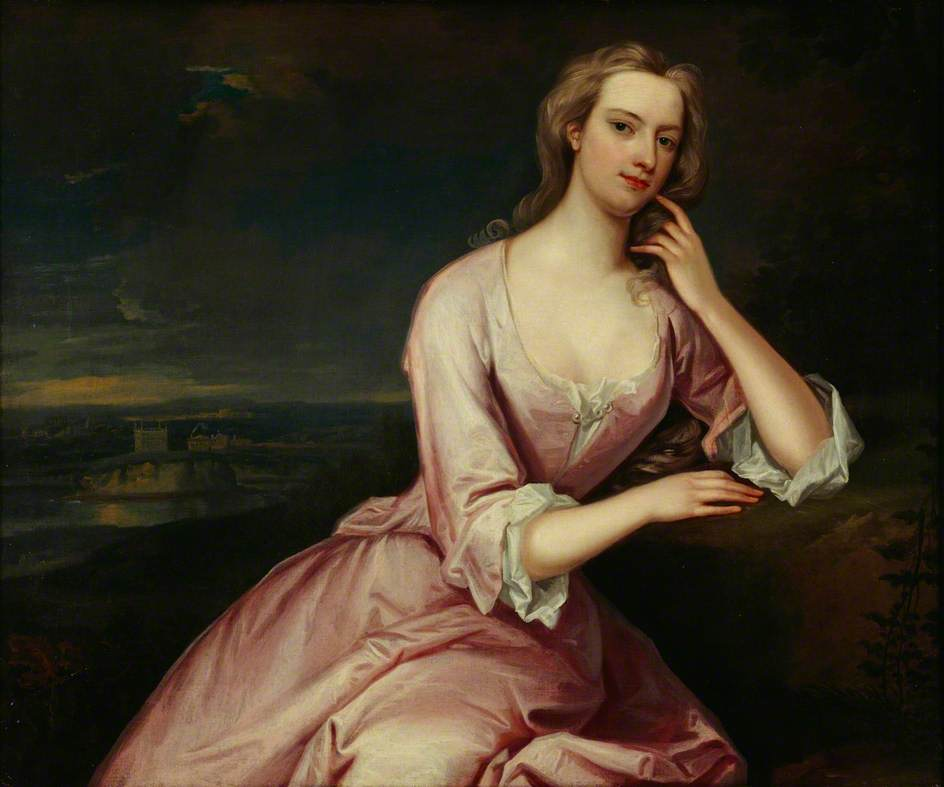
Henrietta Howard, Countess of Suffolk (pictured), was one of Caroline's Women of the Bedchamber in addition to being one of Caroline's husband's mistresses.

George Augustus and Caroline had a successful and loving marriage, though he continued to keep mistresses, as was customary for the time. Caroline was aware of his infidelities; they were well known and he told her about them himself. His two best-known mistresses were Henrietta Howard, later Countess of Suffolk, and, beginning in 1735, Amalie von Wallmoden, Countess of Yarmouth. Howard was one of Caroline's Women of the Bedchamber and became Mistress of the Robes when her husband inherited a peerage in 1731; she retired in 1734. In contrast with George Augustus and his mother, Sophia Dorothea, Caroline was known for her marital fidelity; she never made any embarrassing scenes nor did she take lovers. She preferred her husband's mistresses to be her ladies-in-waiting so that she could keep a closer eye on them.

After the union of England and Scotland in 1707, the succession of George Augustus's family to the united British throne was confirmed but insecure, since Queen Anne's half-brother James Stuart contested the Hanoverian claim, and Anne had fallen out with Dowager Electress Sophia. The Queen refused permission for any of the Hanoverians to visit Britain in her lifetime. Caroline wrote to Leibniz, "I accept the comparison which you draw, though all too flattering, between me and Queen Elizabeth as a good omen. Like Elizabeth, the Electress's rights are denied her by a jealous sister [Queen Anne], and she will never be sure of the English crown until her accession to the throne." In June 1714, Sophia died in Caroline's arms at the age of 83, and Caroline's father-in-law became Queen Anne's heir presumptive. Just weeks later, Anne died, and the Elector of Hanover was proclaimed her successor, becoming George I of Great Britain.

== Princess of Wales ==
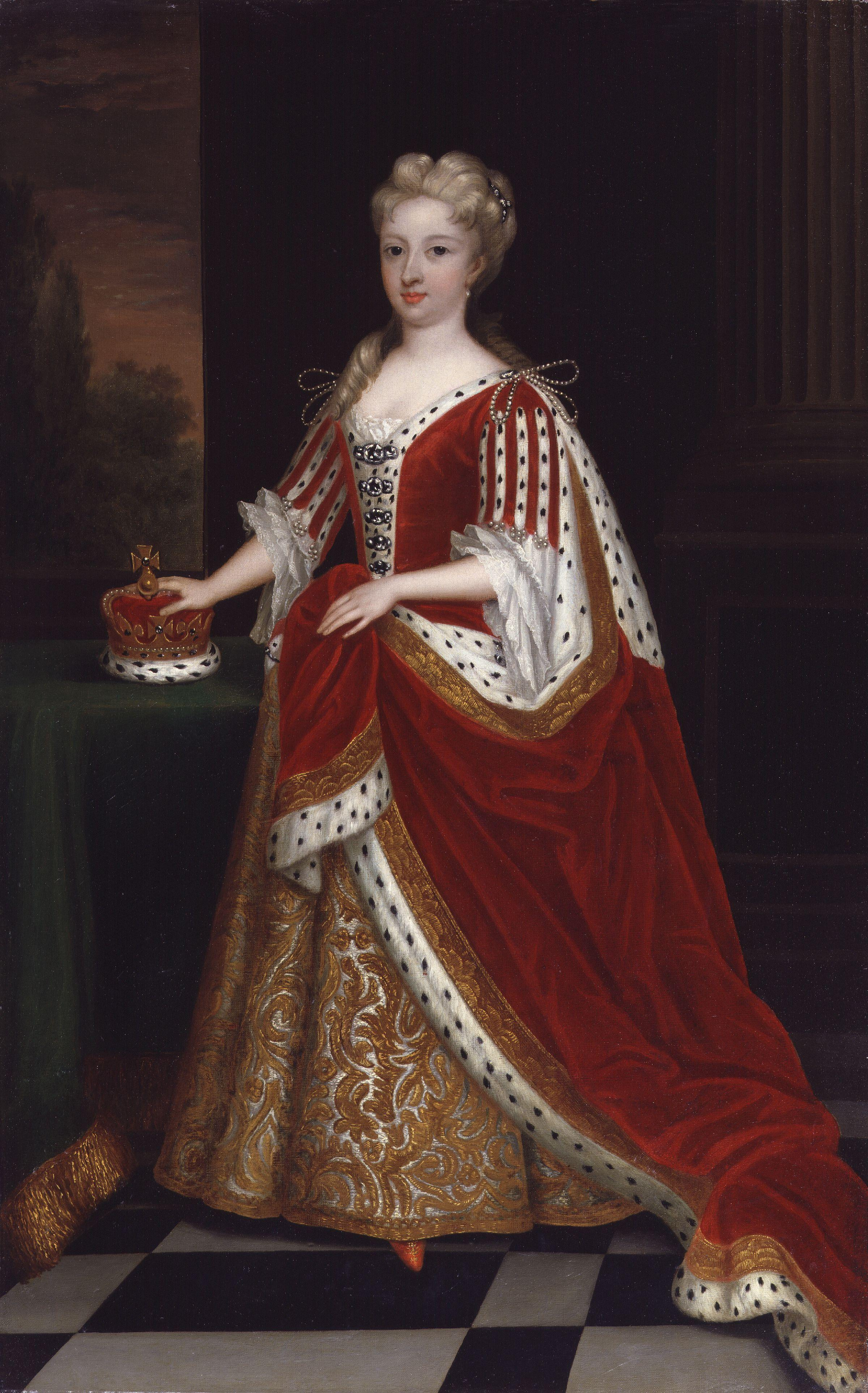
The Princess of Wales, painted by Sir Godfrey Kneller in 1716

George Augustus sailed to England in September 1714, and Caroline and two of her daughters followed in October. Her journey across the North Sea from The Hague to Margate was the only sea voyage she took in her life. Their young son, Prince Frederick, remained in Hanover for the rest of George I's reign, and was brought up by private tutors.

On the accession of George I in 1714, George Augustus automatically became Duke of Cornwall and Duke of Rothesay. Shortly afterwards, he was invested as Prince of Wales, whereupon Caroline became Princess of Wales. She was the first woman to receive the title at the same time as her husband received his. She was also the first Princess of Wales in over two hundred years, the previous one being Catherine of Aragon in the 16th century. Since George I had repudiated his wife, Sophia Dorothea of Celle, in 1694 before he became King of Great Britain, there was no queen consort, and Caroline was therefore the highest-ranking woman in the kingdom. George Augustus and Caroline made a concerted effort to "anglicise" by getting to know England's language, people, politics and customs. Two separate and very different courts developed: the old king's court had German courtiers and government ministers, while the Wales's court attracted English nobles who were out of favour with the King, and was considerably more popular with the British people. George Augustus and Caroline gradually became centres of the political opposition to the King.

Two years after their arrival in England, Caroline suffered a stillbirth, which her friend the Countess of Bückeburg blamed on the incompetence of English doctors, but the following year she had another son, Prince George William, in November. At the baptism, George Augustus fell out with his father over the choice of godparents, leading to the couple's placement under house arrest at St James's Palace prior to their banishment from court. Caroline was originally allowed to stay with their children, but refused as she believed her place was with George Augustus. The couple moved into Leicester House, while their children remained in the care of the King. Caroline fell sick with worry, and fainted during a secret visit to her children made without the King's approval. By January, the King had relented and allowed Caroline unrestricted access. In February, Prince George William fell ill, and the King allowed both George Augustus and Caroline to see him at Kensington Palace without any conditions. When the baby died, a post-mortem was conducted to prove that the cause of death was disease (a polyp on the heart) rather than the separation from his mother. Further tragedy occurred in 1718, when she miscarried at Richmond Lodge, her country residence, after being startled by a violent storm. Over the next few years, Caroline had three more children: William, Mary and Louise. In July 1725, her 11th and final pregnancy ended in a second miscarriage.

Leicester House became a frequent meeting place for the ministry's political opponents. Caroline struck up a friendship with politician Sir Robert Walpole, a former minister in the Whig government who led a disgruntled faction of the party. In April 1720, Walpole's wing of the Whig party reconciled with the governing wing, and Walpole and Caroline helped to effect a reconciliation between the King and George Augustus for the sake of public unity. Caroline wanted to regain her three eldest daughters, who remained in the care of the King, and thought the reconciliation would lead to their return, but negotiations came to nothing. George Augustus came to believe that Walpole had tricked him into the reconciliation as part of a scheme to gain power. The prince was isolated politically when Walpole's Whigs joined the government, and Leicester House played host to literary figures and wits, such as John Arbuthnot and Jonathan Swift, rather than politicians. Arbuthnot told Swift that Caroline had enjoyed his Gulliver's Travels, particularly the tale of the crown prince who wore one high-heel and one low-heel in a country where the King and his party wore low heels, and the opposition wore high ones: a barely veiled reference to the political leanings of the Prince of Wales.

Caroline's intellect far outstripped her husband's, and she read avidly. She established an extensive library at St James's Palace. As a young woman, she corresponded with Gottfried Leibniz, the intellectual colossus who was courtier and factotum to the House of Hanover. She later facilitated the Leibniz-Clarke correspondence, arguably the most important philosophy of physics discussion of the 18th century. She helped to popularise the practice of variolation (an early type of immunisation), which had been witnessed by Lady Mary Wortley Montagu and Charles Maitland in Constantinople. With Caroline's support, six condemned prisoners from Newgate Prison were offered the chance to undergo variolation instead of execution: they all survived the procedure, as did six orphan children given the same treatment as a further test. Convinced of its medical value, Caroline had her children Amelia, Caroline and Frederick inoculated against smallpox in the same manner. In praising her support for smallpox inoculation, Voltaire wrote of her, "I must say that despite all her titles and crowns, this princess was born to encourage the arts and the well-being of mankind; even on the throne she is a benevolent philosopher; and she has never lost an opportunity to learn or to manifest her generosity."

== Queen consort and regent ==
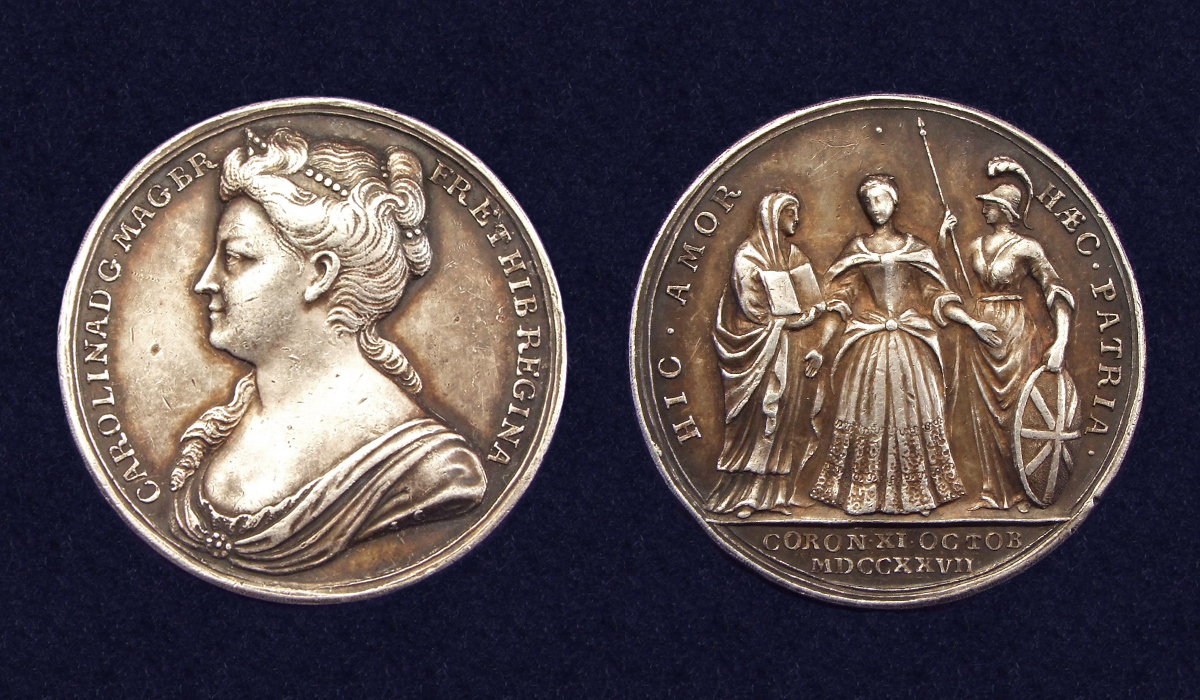
Official coronation medal of Queen Caroline in 1727 by J. Croker

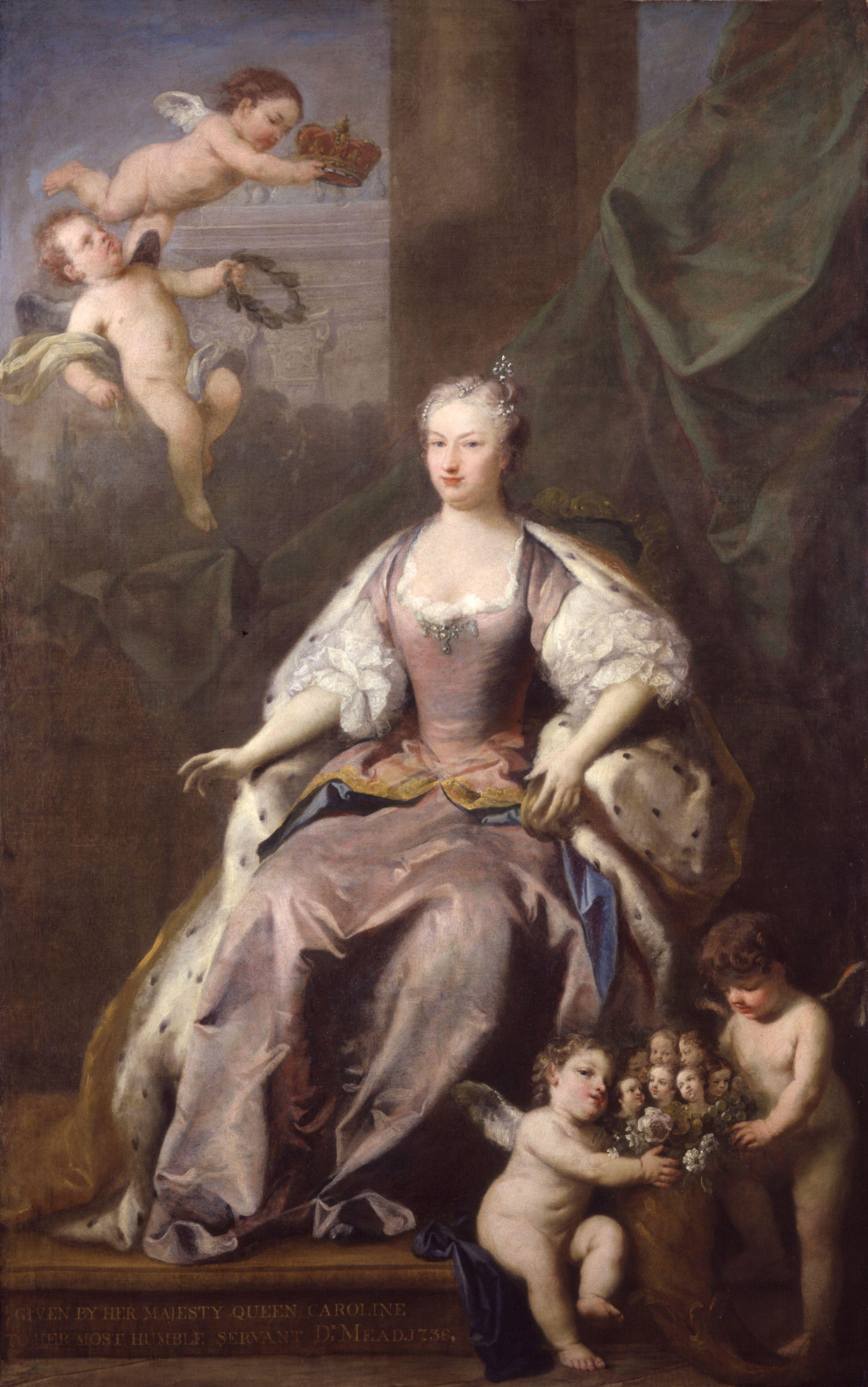
Portrait by Jacopo Amigoni, 1735

On George I's death in 1727, George Augustus ascended as George II and Caroline became queen consort. George II and Caroline's coronation was held at Westminster Abbey on 11 October that year. Though George II denounced Walpole as a "rogue and rascal" over the terms of the reconciliation with his father, Caroline advised her husband to retain Walpole as the leading minister. Walpole commanded a substantial majority in Parliament and George II had little choice but to accept him or risk ministerial instability. Walpole secured a civil list payment of £100,000 a year for Caroline, and she was given both Somerset House and Richmond Lodge. Courtier Lord Hervey called Walpole "the Queen's minister" in recognition of their close relationship. For the next ten years, Caroline had immense influence. She persuaded the King to adopt policies at the behest of Walpole, and persuaded Walpole against taking inflammatory actions. Caroline had absorbed the liberal opinions of her mentor, Queen Sophia Charlotte of Prussia, and supported clemency for the Jacobites (supporters of the rival Stuart claim to the throne), freedom of the press, and freedom of speech in Parliament.

Over the next few years, the King and Queen fought a constant battle against their eldest son, Frederick, Prince of Wales, who had been left behind in Germany when they came to England. He joined the family in 1728, by which time he was an adult, had mistresses and debts, and was fond of gambling and practical jokes. He opposed his father's political beliefs, and complained of his lack of influence in government. The Regency Act 1728 made Caroline rather than Frederick regent when her husband was in Hanover for five months from May 1729. During her regency, a diplomatic incident with Portugal (where a British ship had been seized on the Tagus) was defused, and the negotiation of the Treaty of Seville between Britain and Spain was concluded. From May 1732, she was regent for four months while George II was again away in Hanover. An investigation into the penal system uncovered widespread abuses, including cruel treatment and conspiracy in the escape of wealthy convicts. Caroline pressed Walpole for reform, largely unsuccessfully. In March 1733, Walpole introduced an unpopular Excise Bill to parliament, which the Queen supported, but it gathered such strong opposition that it was eventually dropped.

Caroline's entire life in Britain was spent in southeast England in or around London. As queen, she continued to surround herself with artists, writers and intellectuals. She collected jewellery, especially cameos and intaglios, acquired important portraits and miniatures, and enjoyed the visual arts. She commissioned works such as terracotta busts of the kings and queens of England from Michael Rysbrack, and supervised a more naturalistic design of the royal gardens by William Kent and Charles Bridgeman. In 1728, she rediscovered sets of sketches by Leonardo da Vinci and Hans Holbein that had been hidden in a drawer since the reign of William III.

Caroline's eldest daughter, Anne, married William IV, Prince of Orange in 1734 and moved with her husband to the Netherlands. Caroline wrote to her daughter of her "indescribable" sadness at the parting. Anne soon felt homesick and travelled back to England when her husband went on campaign. Eventually her husband and father commanded her to return to Holland.

== Final years ==
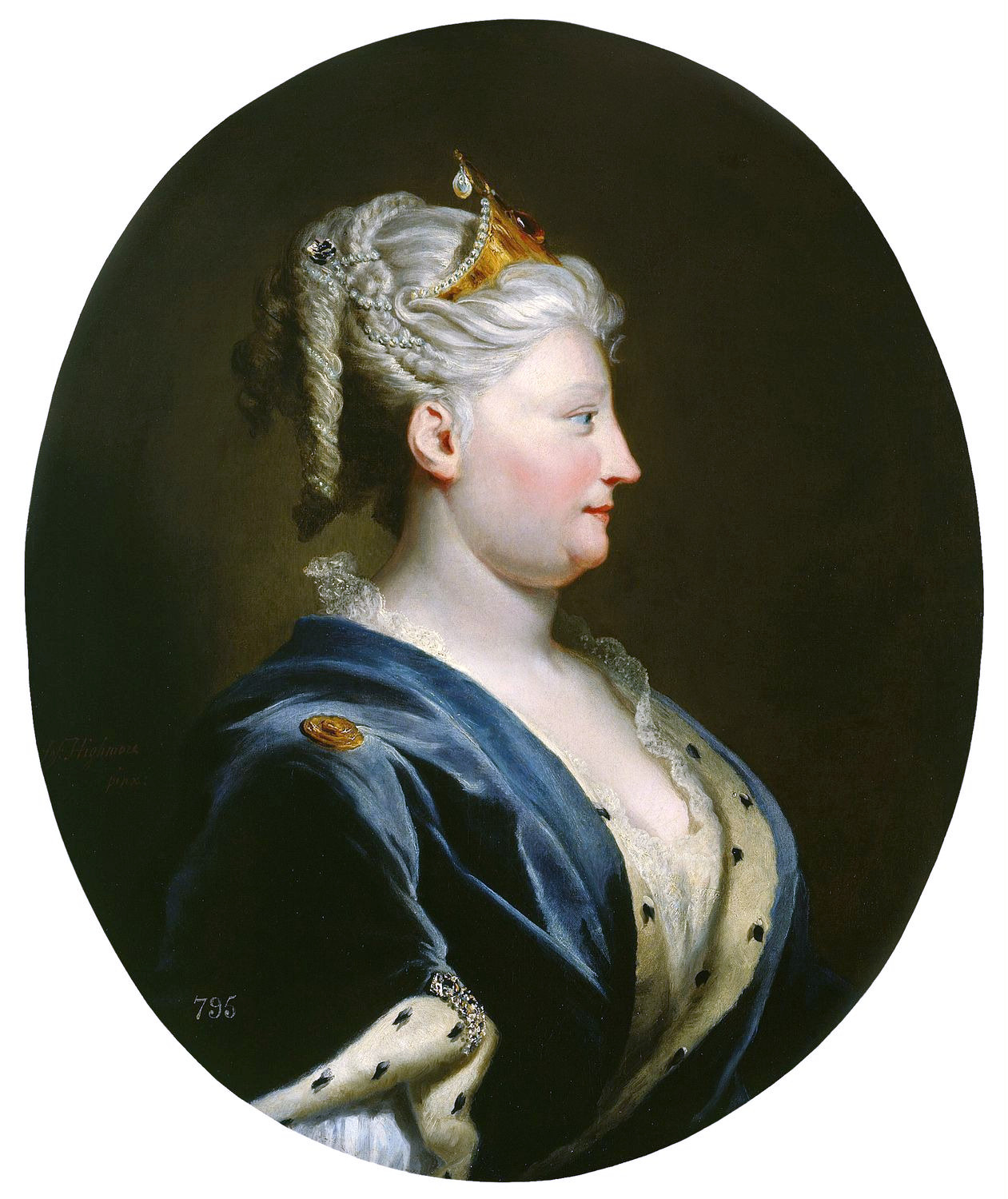
Portrait by Joseph Highmore, 1735

In mid-1735, Prince Frederick was further dismayed when Caroline, rather than himself, again acted as regent while the King was absent in Hanover. The King and Queen arranged Frederick's marriage, in 1736, to Princess Augusta of Saxe-Gotha. Shortly after the wedding, George went to Hanover, and Caroline resumed her role as "Protector of the Realm". As regent, Caroline considered the reprieve of Captain John Porteous, who had been convicted of murder in Edinburgh. Before she could act, a mob stormed the jail where he was held and killed him. Caroline was appalled. George's absences abroad were leading to unpopularity, and in late 1736 he made plans to return, but his ship was caught in poor weather, and it was rumoured that he had been lost at sea. Caroline was devastated, and disgusted by the insensitivity of her son, who hosted a grand dinner while the gale was blowing. During her regency, Frederick attempted to start a number of quarrels with his mother, whom he saw as a useful proxy to irritate the King. George eventually returned in January 1737.

Frederick applied to Parliament unsuccessfully for an increased financial allowance that had hitherto been denied him by the King, and public disagreement over the money drove a further wedge between parents and son. On the advice of Walpole, Frederick's allowance was raised in an attempt to mitigate further conflict, but by less than he had asked. In June 1737, Frederick informed his parents that Augusta was pregnant, and due to give birth in October. In fact, Augusta's due date was earlier and a peculiar episode followed in July in which the prince, on discovering that his wife had gone into labour, sneaked her out of Hampton Court Palace in the middle of the night, to ensure that the King and Queen could not be present at the birth. George and Caroline were horrified. Traditionally, royal births were witnessed by members of the family and senior courtiers to guard against supposititious children, and Augusta had been forced by her husband to ride in a rattling carriage for an hour and a half while heavily pregnant and in pain. With a party including her daughters Amelia and Caroline and Lord Hervey, the Queen raced over to St James's Palace, where Frederick had taken Augusta. Caroline was relieved to discover that Augusta had given birth to a "poor, ugly little she-mouse", also called Augusta, rather than a "large, fat, healthy boy" as the pitiful nature of the baby made a supposititious child unlikely. The circumstances of the birth deepened the estrangement between mother and son. According to Lord Hervey, she once remarked after seeing Frederick, "Look, there he goes—that wretch!—that villain!—I wish the ground would open this moment and sink the monster to the lowest hole in hell!"

In the final years of her life, Caroline was troubled by gout in her feet, but more seriously she had suffered an umbilical hernia at the birth of her final child in 1724. On 9 November 1737, she felt an intense pain and, after struggling through a formal reception, took to her bed. Part of her small intestine had poked through the hernia opening. Over the next few days she was bled, purged, and operated on, without anaesthetic, but there was no improvement in her condition. George refused Frederick permission to see his mother, a decision with which she complied; she sent her son a message of forgiveness through Walpole. She asked her husband to remarry after her death, which he rejected saying he would take only mistresses; she replied "Ah, mon Dieu, cela n'empêche pas" ("My God, that doesn't prevent it"). On 17 November, her strangulated bowel burst. (Note: The circumstances of Caroline's death led Alexander Pope, an opponent of the court and Walpole, to write the epigram: "Here lies, wrapt up in forty thousand towels; the only proof that Caroline had bowels." (Warton, p. 308).) She died on 20 November 1737 at St James's Palace.

Caroline was buried in Westminster Abbey on 17 December. Frederick was not invited to the funeral. George Frideric Handel composed an anthem for the occasion, The Ways of Zion Do Mourn / Funeral Anthem for Queen Caroline. George arranged for a pair of matching coffins with removable sides, so that when he followed her to the grave (23 years later), they could lie together again.

== Legacy ==
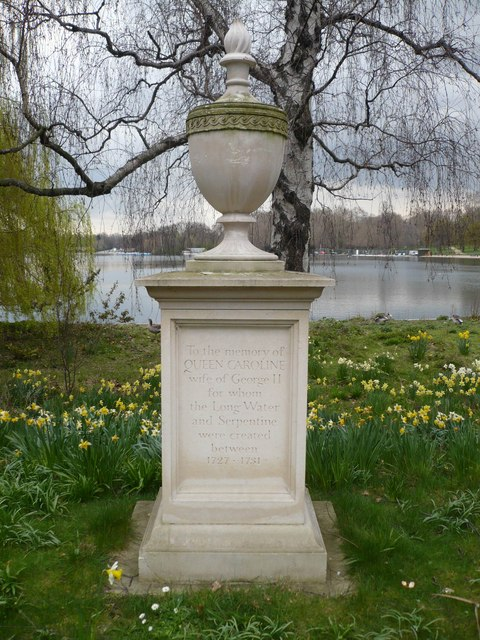
Memorial to Caroline on the bank of the Serpentine, a picturesque lake in London created at her request

Caroline was widely mourned. The Protestants lauded her moral example, and even the Jacobites acknowledged her compassion, and her intervention on the side of mercy for their compatriots. During her lifetime her refusal to convert when offered the hand of Archduke Charles was used to portray her as a strong adherent to Protestantism. For example, John Gay wrote of Caroline in A Letter to A Lady (1714):

The pomp of titles easy faith might shake,
She scorn'd an empire for religion's sake:
For this, on earth, the British crown is giv'n,
And an immortal crown decreed in heav'n.

Caroline was widely seen by both the public and the court as having great influence over her husband. A satirical verse of the period went:

You may strut, dapper George, but 'twill all be in vain,
We all know 'tis Queen Caroline, not you, that reign –
You govern no more than Don Philip of Spain.
Then if you would have us fall down and adore you,
Lock up your fat spouse, as your dad did before you.

The memoirs of the 18th century, particularly those of John, Lord Hervey, fed perceptions that Caroline and Walpole governed her husband. Peter Quennell wrote that Hervey was the "chronicler of this remarkable coalition" and that she was Hervey's "heroine". Using such sources, biographers of the 19th and 20th centuries credit her with aiding the establishment of the House of Hanover in Britain, in the face of Jacobite opposition. R. L. Arkell wrote "by her acumen and geniality, [Caroline] ensured the dynasty's rooting itself in England", and William Henry Wilkins said her "gracious and dignified personality, her lofty ideals and pure life did much to counteract the unpopularity of her husband and father-in-law, and redeem the early Georgian era from utter grossness." Although modern historians tend to believe that Hervey, Wilkins and Arkell have overestimated her importance, it is nevertheless probable that Caroline of Ansbach was one of the most influential consorts in British history.

== Titles, styles, honours and arms ==
=== Titles and styles ===
- 1 March 1683 – 22 August 1705: Her Serene Highness Princess Caroline of Brandenburg-Ansbach
- 22 August 1705 – 1 August 1714: Her Serene Highness The Electoral Princess of Hanover
- 1 August 1714 – 11 June 1727: Her Royal Highness The Princess of Wales
- 11 June 1727– 20 November 1737: Her Majesty The Queen

=== Honours ===
Caroline County in the British Colony of Virginia was named in the Queen's honour when it was formed in 1727.

=== Arms ===
The royal coat of arms of the United Kingdom are impaled with those of Caroline's father. The arms of her father were quarterly of fifteen, 1st, per fess gules and argent, within a bordure counter-changed of the same (for Magdeburg); 2nd, argent, an eagle displayed sable, crowned or; 3rd, or, a griffin segreant gules, crowned; 4th and 5th, argent, a griffin segreant gules; 6th, or, a griffin segreant sable; 7th, argent, an eagle displayed sable (for Crossen); 8th, per pale argent and gules within a bordure counter-changed of the same (for Halberstadt); 9th, argent, an eagle displayed sable; 10th, or, a lion rampant sable, crowned, within a bordure goboné argent and gules (for Nuremberg); 11th, gules, two keys in saltire or (for Minden); 12th, quarterly argent and sable (for Hohenzollern); 13th, the field gules, the figure argent; (Note: The symbol or charge of "the figure" is depicted but not defined by Thomas Willement.) 14th, per fess gules and argent; 15th, plain field of gules (for right of regalia); overall an inescutcheon, argent, an eagle displayed gules (for Brandenburg).

Queen Caroline's coat of arms: the royal arms of the United Kingdom (dexter) impaling her father's arms

== Issue ==
Caroline's ten or eleven pregnancies resulted in eight live births, of whom one died in infancy, and seven lived to adulthood.

Name	Birth	Death	Notes
Frederick, Prince of Wales	31 January 1707	31 March 1751	married 1736, Princess Augusta of Saxe-Gotha; had issue, including the future George III
Anne, Princess Royal	2 November 1709	12 January 1759	married 1734, William IV, Prince of Orange; had issue
Princess Amelia	10 June 1711	31 October 1786	
Princess Caroline	10 June 1713	28 December 1757	
Stillborn son	20 November 1716		
Prince George William	13 November 1717	17 February 1718	died in infancy
Miscarriage	May 1718		
Prince William, Duke of Cumberland	26 April 1721	31 October 1765	
Princess Mary	5 March 1723	14 January 1772	married 1740, Frederick II, Landgrave of Hesse-Kassel; had issue
Princess Louisa	18 December 1724	19 December 1751	married 1743, Frederick V, King of Denmark and Norway; had issue
Miscarriage	July 1725		
Dates in this table are New Style

== Genealogical table ==
Caroline's relationship with the previous kings and queens of Britain

James VI and I	Anne of Denmark
Henrietta Maria of France	Charles I of England	Elizabeth of Bohemia	Frederick V of the Palatinate
Catherine of Braganza	Charles II of England	William II of Orange	Mary, Princess Royal	Anne Hyde	James II of England	Mary of Modena	Sophia of Hanover	Ernest Augustus of Brunswick-Lüneburg
William III of England	Mary II of England	Anne, Queen of Great Britain	George of Denmark	James Francis Edward	Clementina Sobieska	George I of Great Britain	Sophia Dorothea of Celle
Charles Edward Stuart	Louise of Stolberg	George II of Great Britain	Caroline of Ansbach

== Notes ==
Caroline of Ansbach House of Hohenzollern Born: 1 March 1683 Died: 20 November 1737
Royal titles
Vacant Title last held by George of Denmark as consort	Queen consort of Great Britain and Ireland; 1727–1737	Vacant Title next held by Charlotte of Mecklenburg-Strelitz
Vacant Title last held by Sophia of the Palatinate	Electress consort of Hanover; 1727–1737	Vacant Title next held by Charlotte of Mecklenburg-Strelitz
