= Prince George William of Great Britain =

British prince (1717–1718)

Prince George William
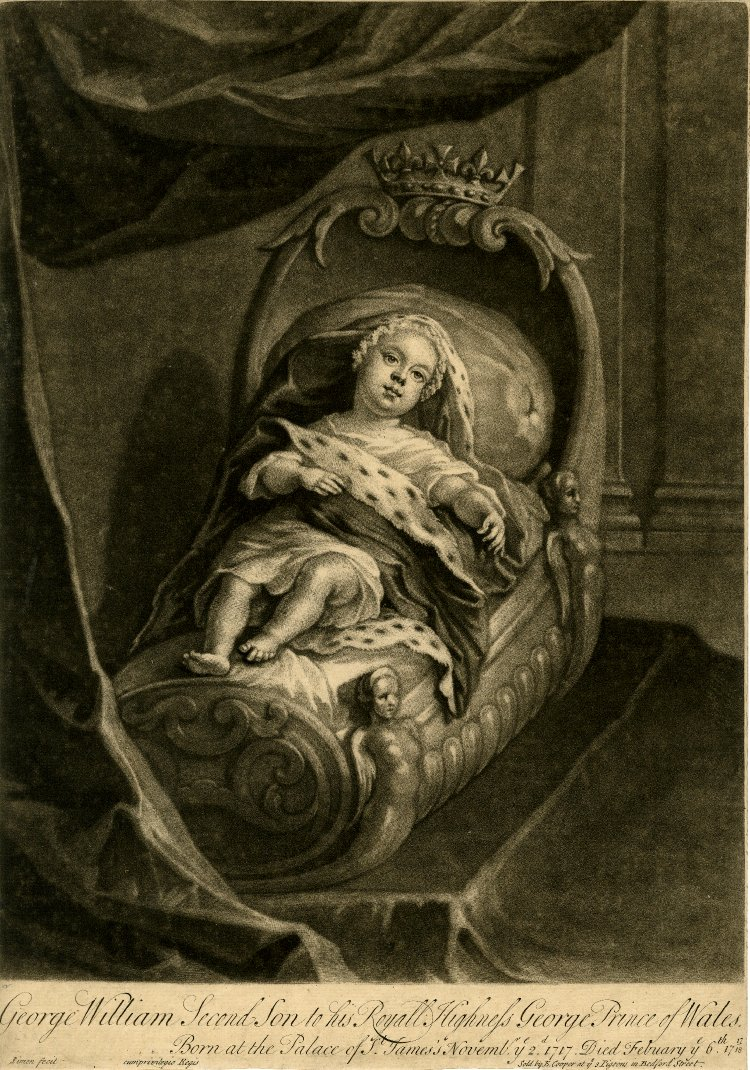
- Born: 13 November 1717; St James's Palace, London, England
- Died: 17 February 1718 (aged 3 months 4 days); Kensington Palace, London, England
- Burial: 23 February 1718; Westminster Abbey, London
- House: Hanover
- Father: George II of Great Britain
- Mother: Caroline of Ansbach

Prince George William of Great Britain (13 November 1717 – 17 February 1718) was a member of the British royal family, second son of the Prince and Princess of Wales (later King George II and Queen Caroline). He died aged 3 months, 4 days. A post-mortem was conducted to prove that he died from disease and not separation from his mother. He was buried at Westminster Abbey.

== Biography ==
Prince George William was born at St James's Palace in London on 13 November 1717 (2 November 1717 on the Julian calendar in use at the time). His father, The Prince of Wales, was the son of George I. His mother was Caroline of Ansbach, daughter of Johann Friedrich, Margrave of Brandenburg-Ansbach. Twenty-six days after his birth, he was baptised at St James's Palace by Bishop of London John Robinson. His godparents were his grandfather the King, the Duke of Newcastle (Lord Chamberlain of the King's Household) and the Duchess of St Albans (First Lady of the Bedchamber to his mother).

The baptism was the catalyst for a family quarrel. The infant's parents wanted to call the baby Louis, and suggested the Queen in Prussia and the Duke of York as sponsors. The King chose the names George William, and, supposedly following custom, appointed the Lord Chamberlain, the Duke of Newcastle, as one of the baptismal sponsors of the child. The King was angered when the Prince of Wales, who disliked Newcastle, verbally insulted the Duke at the christening, which the Duke misunderstood as a challenge to a duel; the Prince shook his fist at Newcastle and said "You are a rascal, but I shall find you out!", which the Duke apparently misheard as "I shall fight you!" The Prince of Wales was banished from court, and he and the Princess of Wales moved into Leicester House, while their children remained in the care of the King. Caroline fell sick with worry, and fainted during a secret visit to her children made without the King's approval. By January, the King had relented and allowed Caroline unrestricted access. In February, Prince George William fell ill, and the King allowed both the Prince and Princess of Wales to see him at Kensington Palace without any conditions. When George William died at three months of age, a post-mortem was conducted to prove that the cause of death was disease (a polyp on the heart) rather than the separation from his mother.

== Ancestors ==
Ancestors of Prince George William of Great Britain

8. Ernest Augustus, Elector of Hanover
4. George I of Great Britain
9. Princess Sophia of the Palatinate
2. George II of Great Britain
10. George William, Duke of Brunswick-Lüneburg
5. Duchess Sophia Dorothea of Brunswick-Celle
11. Éléonore Desmier d'Olbreuse
1. Prince George William
12. Albert II, Margrave of Brandenburg-Ansbach
6. John Frederick, Margrave of Brandenburg-Ansbach
13. Countess Sophie Margarete of Oettingen-Oettingen
3. Princess Caroline of Brandenburg-Ansbach
14. John George I, Duke of Saxe-Eisenach
7. Princess Eleonore Erdmuthe of Saxe-Eisenach
15. Johannetta, Countess of Sayn-Altenkirchen
