= William Frederick =

William Frederick may refer to:

- Prince William Frederick, Duke of Gloucester and Edinburgh
- William Frederick, Prince of Nassau-Dietz
- William Frederick, Margrave of Brandenburg-Ansbach
