= Princess Friederike Luise of Prussia =

Princess Friederike Luise
- Margravine of Brandenburg-Ansbach
- Portrait c. 1725–39
- Born: 29 August 1714; Berlin
- Died: 4 February 1784 (aged 69); Unterschwaningen
- Spouse: Karl Wilhelm Friedrich, Margrave of Brandenburg-Ansbach (m. 1729; died 1757)
- Issue: Charles, Hereditary Prince of Brandenburg-Ansbach; Charles Alexander, Margrave of Brandenburg-Ansbach
- House: Hohenzollern
- Father: Frederick William I of Prussia
- Mother: Sophia Dorothea of Hanover

Princess Friederike Luise of Prussia (German: Friederike Luise von Preußen; 29 August 1714 – 4 February 1784) was the daughter of Frederick William I of Prussia and Sophia Dorothea of Hanover, and Margravine of Brandenburg-Ansbach.

== Family ==
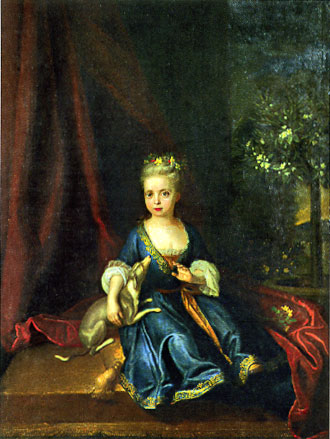
Friederike Luise as a child, 1716

As the sixth child and third daughter of Frederick William I, Friederike Luise was a sister of Frederick II of Prussia, Queen Louisa Ulrika of Sweden, and Philippine Charlotte, Duchess of Brunswick-Wolfenbüttel.

Through her mother, she was a granddaughter of George I of Great Britain. This thus made her a niece of George II of Great Britain, and a cousin of Frederick, Prince of Wales, Anne, Princess of Orange, and Queen Louise of Denmark and Norway.

== Marriage and children ==
On 30 May 1729 in Berlin, Friederike Luise married her Hohenzollern kinsman Karl Wilhelm Friedrich, Margrave of Brandenburg-Ansbach (12 May 1712 – 3 August 1757). They had two sons:

- Charles Frederick Augustus (7 April 1733 – 9 May 1737)
- Charles Alexander, Margrave of Brandenburg-Ansbach (24 February 1736 – 5 January 1806). Married firstly Princess Frederica Caroline of Saxe-Coburg-Saalfeld, and after her death, Lady Elizabeth Craven.

== Biography ==
After the death of her older sister Charlotte Albertine, she was given special consideration and was allowed to grow up as she pleased. Her sister Wilhelmine of Bayreuth described her in her memoirs as possessing a "capricious and petty nature". However, she also praised her talent and beauty.

Her mother-in-law, the regent of Ansbach, and her father, who wished to gain influence in Ansbach arranged her marriage, . Her brother, King Frederick II, extended her appanage and received in return a regiment of soldiers from Ansbach.

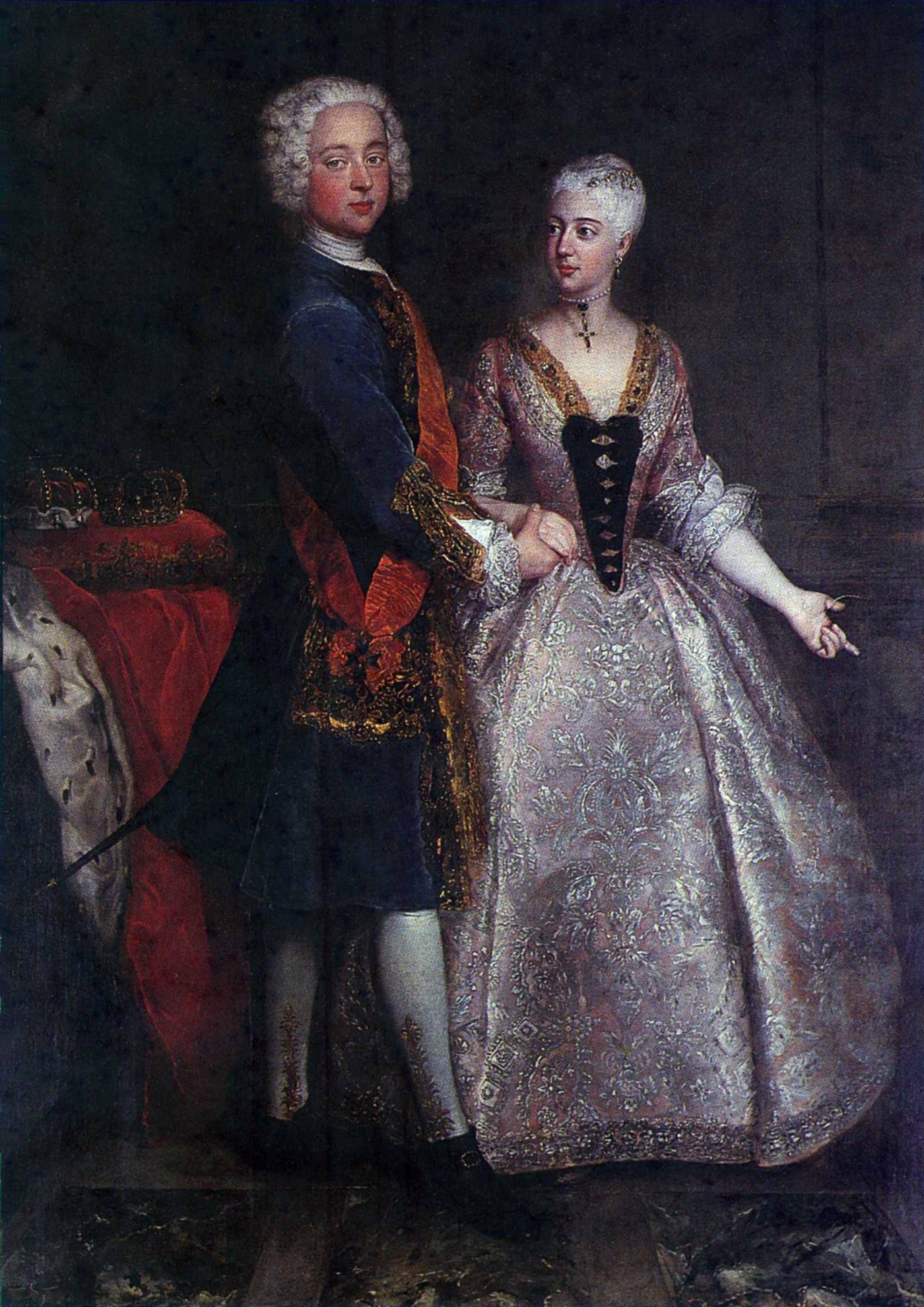
Wedding portrait of Friederike Luise and Karl Wilhelm Friedrich (Antoine Pesne, 1729)

The marriage was unhappy; her spouse Karl Wilhelm Friedrich was known as "The wild margrave". He even remarked to King Friedrich Wilhelm I of Prussia that he had cheated by the marriage. Even on the trip to Ansbach in June 1729 for her wedding, Luise Friederike was suffering from symptoms of the metabolic disease porphyria. She suffered from nausea, vomiting, and fainting during which she was "dead as it seemed". Her spouse claimed she was lame and had bad teeth. Initially, he would not sleep with her. Crown Prince Frederick of Prussia commented on the marriage in February 1732 in these terms: "My sister and her husband, the Ansbacher hate each other like fire." («... ma soeur et son mari d'Anspach se haïssent comme le feu. ») At a window in the family room of the Ansbacher Residenz, she scratched this plea with a diamond in the glass: « Je souffre sans oser le dire. » (I suffer without daring to say it.)

At the birth of her son, Friederike Louise was given Hofmark Unterschwaningen as a residence. However, the Hereditary Prince Carl Friedrich August died on 9 May 1737. The Margrave and the whole court blamed Friederike Louise for his death. She separated from her spouse and lived increasingly in the seclusion of Unterschwaningen, which she expanded artistically. Friederike Louise did not return to Ansbach until she became a widow in 1757. Her unhappiness was further compounded by the refusal of her surviving son to see or acknowledge her.

== Ancestry ==
Ancestors of Princess Friederike Luise of Prussia

16. George William, Elector of Brandenburg
8. Frederick William, Elector of Brandenburg
17. Elizabeth Charlotte of the Palatinate
4. Frederick I of Prussia
18. Frederick Henry, Prince of Orange
9. Louise Henriette of Orange-Nassau
19. Amalia of Solms-Braunfels
2. Frederick William I of Prussia
20. George, Duke of Brunswick-Lüneburg (=24, 28)
10. Ernest Augustus, Elector of Hanover (=12)
21. Anne Eleonore of Hesse-Darmstadt (=25, 29)
5. Sophia Charlotte of Hanover
22. Frederick V, Elector Palatine (=26)
11. Sophia of the Palatinate (=13)
23. Elizabeth Stuart (=27)
1. Princess Friederike Luise of Prussia
24. George, Duke of Brunswick-Lüneburg (=20, 28)
12. Ernest Augustus, Elector of Hanover (=10)
25. Anne Eleonore of Hesse-Darmstadt (=21, 29)
6. George I of Great Britain
26. Frederick V, Elector Palatine (=22)
13. Sophia of the Palatinate (=11)
27. Elizabeth Stuart (=23)
3. Sophia Dorothea of Hanover
28. George, Duke of Brunswick-Lüneburg (=20, 24)
14. George William, Duke of Brunswick-Lüneburg
29. Anne Eleonore of Hesse-Darmstadt (=21, 25)
7. Sophia Dorothea of Celle
30. Alexandre Desmier, Seigneur d'Olbreuse
15. Éléonore Desmier d'Olbreuse
31. Jacquette Poussard du Bas-Vandré

Princess Friederike Luise of Prussia House of Hohenzollern Born: 19 August 1714 Died: 4 February 1784
German nobility
Vacant Title last held by Christiane Charlotte of Württemberg-Winnental	Margravine of Brandenburg-Ansbach; 30 May 1729 – 3 August 1757	Vacant Title next held by Frederica Caroline of Saxe-Coburg-Saalfeld
