= George, Prince of Wales =

George, Prince of Wales may refer to:

- George II of Great Britain (1683–1760), from his creation as Prince of Wales in 1714 to his accession to the throne in 1727
- George III of the United Kingdom (1738–1820), from his creation as Prince of Wales in 1751 until his accession to the throne in 1760
- George IV of the United Kingdom (1762–1830), from his creation as Prince of Wales in 1762 until his accession to the throne in 1820
- George V of the United Kingdom (1865–1936), from his creation as Prince of Wales in 1901 until his accession to the throne in 1910, also known as Prince George of Wales from birth in 1865 to ennoblement as Duke of York in 1892

Prince George of Wales may refer to:

- Prince George William of Great Britain (1717–1718)
- Prince George, Duke of Kent (1902–1942), between 1902 and 1910
- Prince George Alexander Louis (born 2013), since 2022
- George V (see above), from his birth in 1865 until his father's accession in 1901.

== See also ==
- George Wales (disambiguation)
