= George Wales =

George Wales may refer to:

- George Edward Wales (1792–1860), American politician
- George Wales (businessman) (1885–1962), Australian businessman and politician

== See also ==
- George, Prince of Wales (disambiguation)
