= Princess Eleonore Erdmuthe of Saxe-Eisenach =

Princess Eleonore Erdmuthe
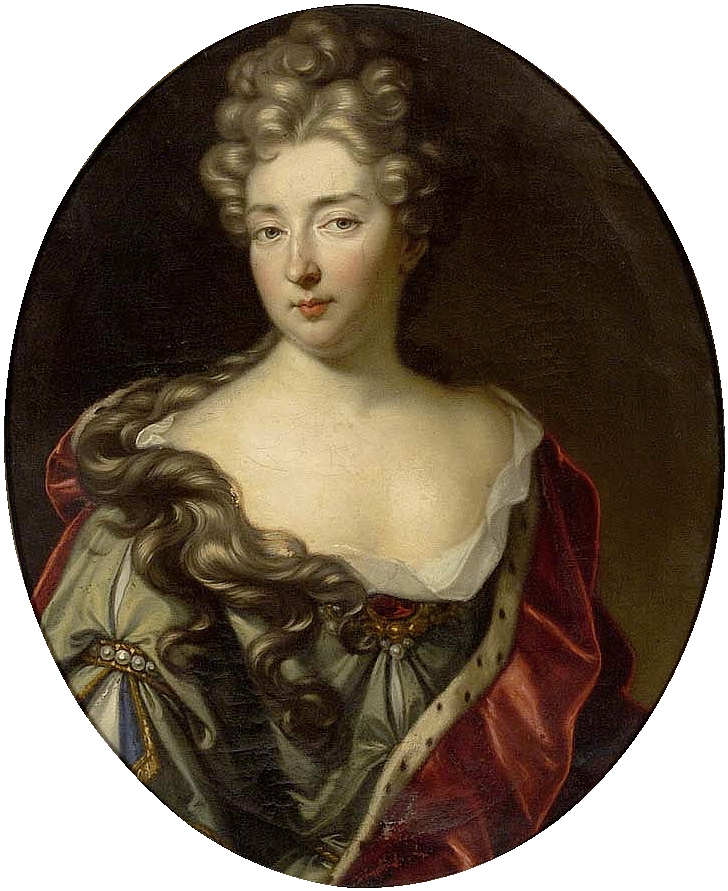
- Portrait by unknown, c. 1690s

Margravine consort of Brandenburg-Ansbach
- Tenure: 4 November 1681 – 22 March 1686

Electress consort of Saxony
- Tenure: 17 April 1692 – 27 April 1694
- Born: 13 April 1662; Friedewald, County of Sayn-Altenkirchen, Holy Roman Empire
- Died: 9 September 1696 (aged 34); Pretzsch, Electorate of Saxony, Holy Roman Empire
- Burial: Freiberg Cathedral
- Spouse: John Frederick, Margrave of Brandenburg-Ansbach (m. 1681; died 1686) John George IV, Elector of Saxony (m. 1692; died 1694)
- Issue: Caroline, Queen of Great Britain and Ireland; Margrave Frederick Augustus; William Frederick, Margrave of Brandenburg-Ansbach
Names
- Eleonore Erdmuthe Louise
- House: Wettin
- Father: John George I, Duke of Saxe-Eisenach
- Mother: Countess Johanna of Sayn-Wittgenstein

Princess Eleonore Erdmuthe Louise of Saxe-Eisenach (13 April 1662 – 9 September 1696) was a member of the House of Wettin and through her two marriages became Margravine of Brandenburg-Ansbach (from 1681 to 1686) and Electress of Saxony (from 1692 to 1694).

== Biography ==
Eleonore Erdmuthe Louise was the eldest child of John George I, Duke of Saxe-Eisenach, and Countess Johannetta of Sayn-Wittgenstein. Of her seven younger siblings, only four survived to adulthood: Frederick August, Hereditary Prince of Saxe-Eisenach, John George II, Duke of Saxe-Eisenach, John William III, Duke of Saxe-Eisenach and Fredericka Elisabeth (by marriage Duchess of Saxe-Weisselfels).

In Eisenach on 4 November 1681, Eleonore married firstly John Frederick, Margrave of Brandenburg-Ansbach as his second wife.

After the death of her husband (22 March 1686), the government of Brandenburg-Ansbach passed to her stepson Christian Albert (eldest surviving son of her husband's first marriage), who being a minor ruled under a regency. Because her relationship with her stepchildren was not good since the beginning, Eleonore and her children moved to Crailsheim, where they lived in poverty; shortly after, she returned alone to her homeland Eisenach, while her children were sent to Berlin, where they became companions of Frederick William, Electoral Prince of Brandenburg. In November 1691 Eleonore also arrived in Berlin to actively participate in the negotiations of her second marriage.

=== Electress of Saxony ===
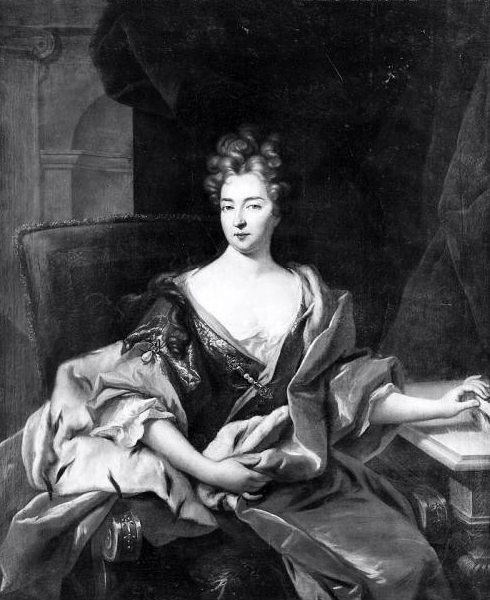
Portrait of Eleonore by the workshop of Louis de Silvestre, 1692

In Leipzig on 17 April 1692, Eleonore married secondly John George IV, Elector of Saxony and moved with her children to Dresden, where the Saxon court was established. The wedding was concluded at the insistence of Frederick III, Elector of Brandenburg (who wanted to secure an alliance with Saxony) (Note: The Electorate of Saxony was heavily influenced by Austria. Saxon field marshal Hans Adam von Schöning longed for liberation of the Electorate from Austrian influence. To this end, he made sure that John George IV made an offer to Eleonore, who by her first marriage now belonged to the House of Hohenzollern. This option is most suited and Frederick III, as the marriage of Eleonore and John George IV marked the actual transition of the Electorate to the side of the future King of Prussia.) and the Dowager Electress of Saxony, Anna Sophie of Denmark, ostensibly to produce legitimate heirs to the Electorate of Saxony but truly to end the liaison between her son and his mistress, Magdalene Sibylle "Billa" of Neidschutz.

The union proved to be unsuccessful; John George IV lived openly with Billa, and she became the first ever Official Mistress (Favoritin) of an Elector of Saxony; while Eleonore was relegated to the Hofe (the official residence of the Elector). In addition, the Electress suffered two miscarriages during their marriage, in August 1692 and February 1693, and a phantom pregnancy in December 1693. In March 1693 began rumors at the Saxon court that Eleonore was not the lawful wife of John George IV, because at the time of their marriage, he was already married with Billa; There was even found a document confirming the conclusion of a marriage contract between the Elector of Saxony and his mistress, but John George IV (probably fearing the anger of the Hohenzollerns) said that he did not consider this contract as a formal marriage, and that it was only made for the purpose of legitimizing his offspring with Billa. Nevertheless, throughout his marriage, John George IV desperately wanted to legitimize the relationship with his mistress and tried to get rid of his wife and her children; fearing for her and her children's lives, Eleonore left the Hofe and settled in Pretzsch. During this time, Eleonore confided in the English diplomat George Stepney, who wrote extensively about her and the Saxon court.

=== Later life ===
John George IV died on 27 April 1694 from smallpox after being infected by the dying Billa. The new Elector, Frederick Augustus I allowed the Dowager Electress and her children to remain in Pretzsch, where they lived until Eleonore's death two years later, on 9 September 1696. She was buried at Freiberg Cathedral.

After her death, Eleonore's children were sent back to Ansbach to the court of their older half-brother George Frederick II, who became in the new Margrave of Brandenburg-Ansbach after Christian Albert's death in 1692. George Frederick II, as well as his predecessor, was a minor and ruled under a regency, who had little interest in the education of the children. William Frederick stayed in Ansbach and in 1703 after the death of his brother inherited the Margraviate; Caroline went to Berlin at Charlottenburg Palace under the care of Frederick III, Elector of Brandenburg, and his wife, Sophia Charlotte of Hanover, who was a friend of Eleonore.

== Issue ==
She had three children:

- Wilhelmina Charlotte Caroline of Brandenburg-Ansbach (1 March 1683 – 20 November 1737), married George II of Great Britain and had issue.
- Margrave Frederick Augustus of Brandenburg-Ansbach (3 January 1685 – 30 January 1685), died in infancy.
- William Frederick, Margrave of Brandenburg-Ansbach (8 January 1686 – 7 January 1723) married Duchess Christiane Charlotte of Württemberg, daughter of Frederick Charles, Duke of Württemberg-Winnental and had issue.

== Sources ==
- Arkell, Ruby Lillian Percival. Caroline of Ansbach. Oxford University Press, 1939. 338 p. google.books.com
- Beatty, Michael A. The English Royal Family of America, from Jamestown to the American Revolution. McFarland, 2003 pp. 133–138. 261 p. ISBN 0786415584, ISBN 9780786415588. google.books.com
- Böttcher, Hans-Joachim. Johann Georg IV. von Sachsen und Magdalena Sibylla von Neitschütz - Eine tödliche Liaison. Dresden 2014. ISBN 978-3-941757-43-1.
- Hichens, Mark. Wives of the Kings of England: From Hanover to Windsor. Peter Owen, 2006. 182 p. ISBN 0720612713, ISBN 9780720612714. google.books.com
- Sharp, Tony. Pleasure and Ambition: The Life, Loves and Wars of Augustus the Strong, 1670-1707. London: I.B. Tauris, 2001. ISBN 0857715712, ISBN 9780857715715 google.books.com
- Van der Kiste, John. George II and Queen Caroline. Stroud, Gloucestershire: The History Press, 2013. 240 p. ISBN 0750954485, ISBN 9780750954488. google.books.com
- Weir, Alison. Britain's Royal Families: The Complete Genealogy. Random House, 2011 pp. 277–278. 400 p. ISBN 1446449114, ISBN 9781446449110. google.books.com

Princess Eleonore Erdmuthe of Saxe-Eisenach House of Wettin Born: 13 April 1662 Died: 9 September 1696
German nobility
Vacant Title last held by Johanna Elisabeth of Baden-Durlach	Margravine consort of Brandenburg-Ansbach; 4 November 1681 – 22 March 1686	Vacant Title next held by Christiane Charlotte of Württemberg-Winnental
Vacant Title last held by Anna Sophie of Denmark	Electress consort of Saxony; 17 April 1692 – 27 April 1694	Succeeded by Christiane Eberhardine of Brandenburg-Bayreuth
