= William Frederick, Margrave of Brandenburg-Ansbach =

Margrave of Brandenburg-Ansbach

William Frederick
- Margrave of Brandenburg-Ansbach
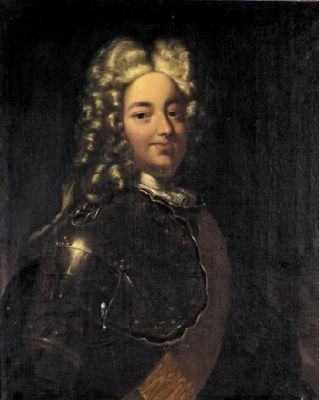
- Portrait by Johann Peter Feuerlein
- Born: 8 January 1686; Ansbach
- Died: 7 January 1723 (aged 36); Unterreichenbach
- Spouse: Christiane Charlotte of Württemberg-Winnental (m. 1709)
- Issue: Karl Wilhelm Friedrich, Margrave of Brandenburg-Ansbach; Margravine Eleonore; Margrave Frederick Charles
- House: Hohenzollern
- Father: John Frederick, Margrave of Brandenburg-Ansbach
- Mother: Princess Eleonore Erdmuthe of Saxe-Eisenach

William Frederick, Margrave of Brandenburg-Ansbach (8 January 1686 – 7 January 1723), was Margrave of the Principality of Brandenburg-Ansbach from 1703 until his death in 1723. He was the younger brother of Caroline of Ansbach and thus brother-in-law of George II of Great Britain.

== Early life ==
William Frederick was born in Ansbach in 1686 to John Frederick, Margrave of Brandenburg-Ansbach, and his father's second wife; Eleonore Erdmuthe of Saxe-Eisenach. His two surviving half-brothers, Margraves Christian Albert and George Frederick II, both died unmarried and without legitimate issue.

== Personal life ==
He married his first cousin, Christiane Charlotte of Württemberg-Winnental in 1709. He died in Unterreichenbach and was succeeded by his son Charles William Frederick, called "The Wild Margrave".

== Ancestry ==
Ancestors of William Frederick, Margrave of Brandenburg-Ansbach

16. John George, Elector of Brandenburg
8. Joachim Ernst, Margrave of Brandenburg-Ansbach
17. Princess Elizabeth of Anhalt
4. Albert II, Margrave of Brandenburg-Ansbach
18. John George I, Count of Solms-Laubach
9. Countess Sophie of Solms-Laubach
19. Countess Margaret of Schönburg-Glauchau
2. John Frederick, Margrave of Brandenburg-Ansbach
20. Ludwig Eberhard, Count of Oettingen-Oettingen
10. Joachim Ernest, Count of Oettingen-Oettingen
21. Countess Margaret of Erbach
5. Countess Sophie Margarete of Oettingen-Oettingen
22. Henry William I, Count of Solms-Sonnenwalde
11. Countess Anna Sibylle of Solms-Sonnenwald
23. Countess Sophia Dorothea of Mansfeld-Arnstein
1. William Frederick, Margrave of Brandenburg-Ansbach
24. John II, Duke of Saxe-Weimar
12. William, Duke of Saxe-Weimar
25. Princess Dorothea Maria of Anhalt
6. John George I, Duke of Saxe-Eisenach
26. John George I, Prince of Anhalt-Dessau
13. Princess Eleonore Dorothea of Anhalt-Dessau
27. Countess Palatine Dorothea of Simmern
3. Princess Eleonore Erdmuthe of Saxe-Eisenach
28. William III, Count of Sayn-Wittgenstein
14. Ernest, Count of Sayn-Wittgenstein-Sayn
29. Countess Anna Elizabeth of Sayn-Sayn
7. Johannetta, Countess of Sayn-Altenkirchen
30. George III, Count of Erbach-Breuberg
15. Countess Louise Juliane of Erbach
31. Countess Maria of Barby-Mühlingen

William Frederick, Margrave of Brandenburg-Ansbach House of Hohenzollern Born: 8 January 1686 Died: 7 January 1723
Preceded by George Frederick II	Margrave of Brandenburg-Ansbach; 1703–1723	Succeeded by Charles William Frederick
