= Christiane Charlotte of Württemberg-Winnental =

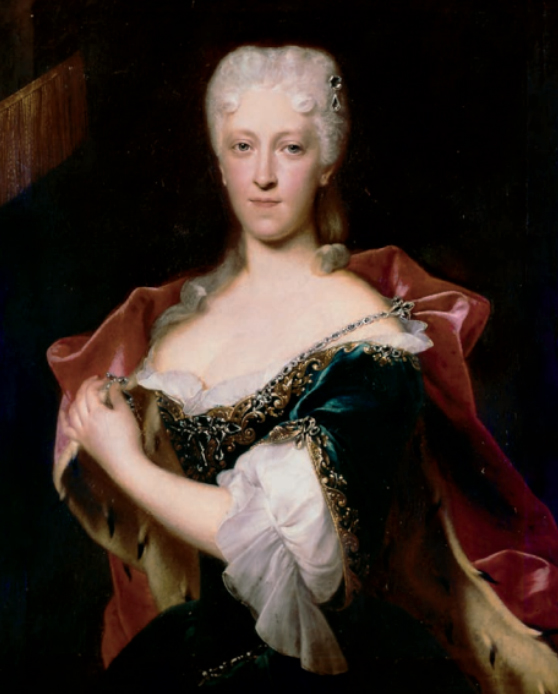
- Portrait by Jan Kupecký, c. 1725

Margravine of Brandenburg-Ansbach
- Tenure: 28 August 1709 – 7 January 1723
- Born: 20 August 1694; Stuttgart
- Died: 25 December 1729 (aged 35); Ludwigsburg
- Spouse: William Frederick, Margrave of Brandenburg-Ansbach
- Issue: Karl Wilhelm Friedrich, Margrave of Brandenburg-Ansbach; Margravine Eleonore; Margrave Frederick Charles
- House: Württemberg
- Father: Frederick Charles, Duke of Württemberg-Winnental
- Mother: Margravine Eleonore Juliane of Brandenburg-Ansbach

Christiane Charlotte of Württemberg-Winnental (20 August 1694 – 25 December 1729) was a German princess and regent. She was regent of Brandenburg-Ansbach in 1723-1729.

== Biography ==
Born in Kirchheim unter Teck, her parents were Frederick Charles, Duke of Württemberg-Winnental, and his wife Margravine Eleonore Juliane of Brandenburg-Ansbach, a daughter of Albert II, Margrave of Brandenburg-Ansbach.

Christine Charlotte was also margravine of Brandenburg-Ansbach through her marriage to her cousin William Frederick, Margrave of Brandenburg-Ansbach, of the House of Hohenzollern. She became regent of Ansbach from her husband's death in 1723 until the end of the minority of their eldest son, Charles William Frederick, in 1729. Christiane and William Frederick's other children were Eleonore (1713–1714) and Frederick Charles (1715–1716). Schloss Bruckberg was used as her sons' "educational establishment". She died in Ansbach in 1729 and is now buried in the margraves' vault in St Gumbertus's Church in Ansbach.

== Ancestors ==
Ancestors of Christiane Charlotte of Württemberg-Winnental

16. Frederick I, Duke of Württemberg
8. John Frederick, Duke of Württemberg
17. Princess Sibylla of Anhalt-Zerbst
4. Eberhard III, Duke of Württemberg
18. Joachim Frederick, Elector of Brandenburg
9. Princess Barbara Sophie of Brandenburg
19. Princess Catherine of Brandenburg-Küstrin
2. Frederick Charles, Duke of Württemberg-Winnental
20. Otto I, Wild- and Rhinegrave of Salm-Kyrburg-Mörchingen
10. Johannes Casimir, Wild- and Rhinegrave of Salm-Kyrburg
21. Countess Otillie of Nassau-Weilburg
5. Wild- and Rhinegravine Anna Katharina of Salm-Kyrburg
22. John George I, Count of Solms-Laubach
11. Countess Dorothea von Solms-Laubach
23. Margarete von Schönburg-Glauchau
1. Christiane Charlotte of Württemberg-Winnental
24. John George, Elector of Brandenburg
12. Joachim Ernst, Margrave of Brandenburg-Ansbach
25. Princess Elisabeth of Anhalt-Zerbst
6. Albert II, Margrave of Brandenburg-Ansbach
26. John George I, Count of Solms-Laubach (= 22)
13. Countess Sophie of Solms-Laubach
27. Margarete von Schönburg-Glauchau (= 23)
3. Margravine Eleonore Juliane of Brandenburg-Ansbach
28. Ludwig Eberhard, Count of Oettingen-Oettingen
14. Joachim Ernst, Count of Oettingen-Oettingen
29. Countess Margareta von Erbach
7. Countess Sophie Margarete of Oettingen-Oettingen
30. Heinrich Wilhelm, Count of Solms-Sonnenwalde-Pouch
25. Countess Anna Sibylla of Solms-Sonnenwalde-Pouch
31. Countess Sophie Dorothea of Mansfeld-Arnstein

== Bibliography ==
- M. Spindler, A. Kraus: Geschichte Frankens bis zum Ausgang des 18. Jahrhunderts, München 1997. ISBN 3-406-39451-5
- A. Schödl: Frauen und dynastische Politik, 1703-1723. Die Markgräfinnen Elisabeth Sophie von Brandenburg und Christiane Charlotte von Ansbach, Plassenburg 2007. ISBN 978-3-925162-24-4
- A. Schödl: Christiane Charlotte. Fürstin, Mutter und Frau, Sonderdruck Nr. 7. Verein der Freunde von Triesdorf 2009

Christiane Charlotte of Württemberg-Winnental House of Württemberg Born: 20 August 1694 Died: 25 December 1729
German nobility
Vacant Title last held by Eleonore Erdmuthe of Saxe-Eisenach	Margravine of Brandenburg-Ansbach; 28 August 1709 – 7 January 1723	Vacant Title next held by Friederike Luise of Prussia
