= Christian Albert, Margrave of Brandenburg-Ansbach =

Christian Albert

Margrave of Brandenburg-Ansbach
- Reign: 22 March 1686 – 16 October 1692
- Predecessor: John Frederick
- Successor: George Frederick II
- Born: 18 September 1675; Ansbach
- Died: 16 October 1692 (aged 17); Ansbach
- House: House of Hohenzollern
- Father: John Frederick, Margrave of Brandenburg-Ansbach
- Mother: Johanna Elisabeth of Baden-Durlach

Christian Albert (Albrecht), Margrave of Brandenburg-Ansbach, born 18 September 1675 in the city of Ansbach, was German gentry, holding the position of Margrave within the Fraconian Principality of Ansbach from the year 1686 until 16 October 1692 when he died.

== Rule ==
Albert was the second son of Margrave John Frederick and his first wife, Johanna Elisabeth of Baden-Durlach. Due to the untimely death of his older brother, Leopold Frederick at the age of two, Christian Albert was designated as heir apparent in 1676, succeeding his father as Margrave of Brandenburg-Ansbach upon his death in 1686. Due to his status as a minor upon the death of his father, Albrecht entered a guardianship arrangement and a regent was appointed to him.

Chrisitan Albrecht did not reach adulthood and died on the 16th of October 1692. Due to his lack of progeny, he was succeeded by his younger brother George Frederick the Elder.

== Ancestry ==
Ancestors of Christian Albert, Margrave of Brandenburg-Ansbach

8. Joachim Ernst, Margrave of Brandenburg-Ansbach
4. Albert II, Margrave of Brandenburg-Ansbach
9. Sophie of Solms-Laubach
2. John Frederick, Margrave of Brandenburg-Ansbach
10. Joachim Ernst, Count of Oettingen-Oettingen
5. Sophie Margarete of Oettingen-Oettingen
11. Anna Sibylla of Solms-Sonnenwalde
1. Christian Albert, Margrave of Brandenburg-Ansbach
12. Frederick V, Margrave of Baden-Durlach
6. Frederick VI, Margrave of Baden-Durlach
13. Barbara of Württemberg
3. Johanna Elisabeth of Baden-Durlach
14. John Casimir, Count Palatine of Kleeburg
7. Christina Magdalena of the Palatinate-Zweibrücken
15. Catherine of Sweden

Christian Albert, Margrave of Brandenburg-Ansbach House of Hohenzollern Born: 18 September 1675 Died: 16 October 1692
Preceded by John Frederick	Margrave of Brandenburg-Ansbach; 1686–1692	Succeeded by George Frederick II
