= George Frederick II =

Margrave of Brandenburg-Ansbach from 1692 to 1703

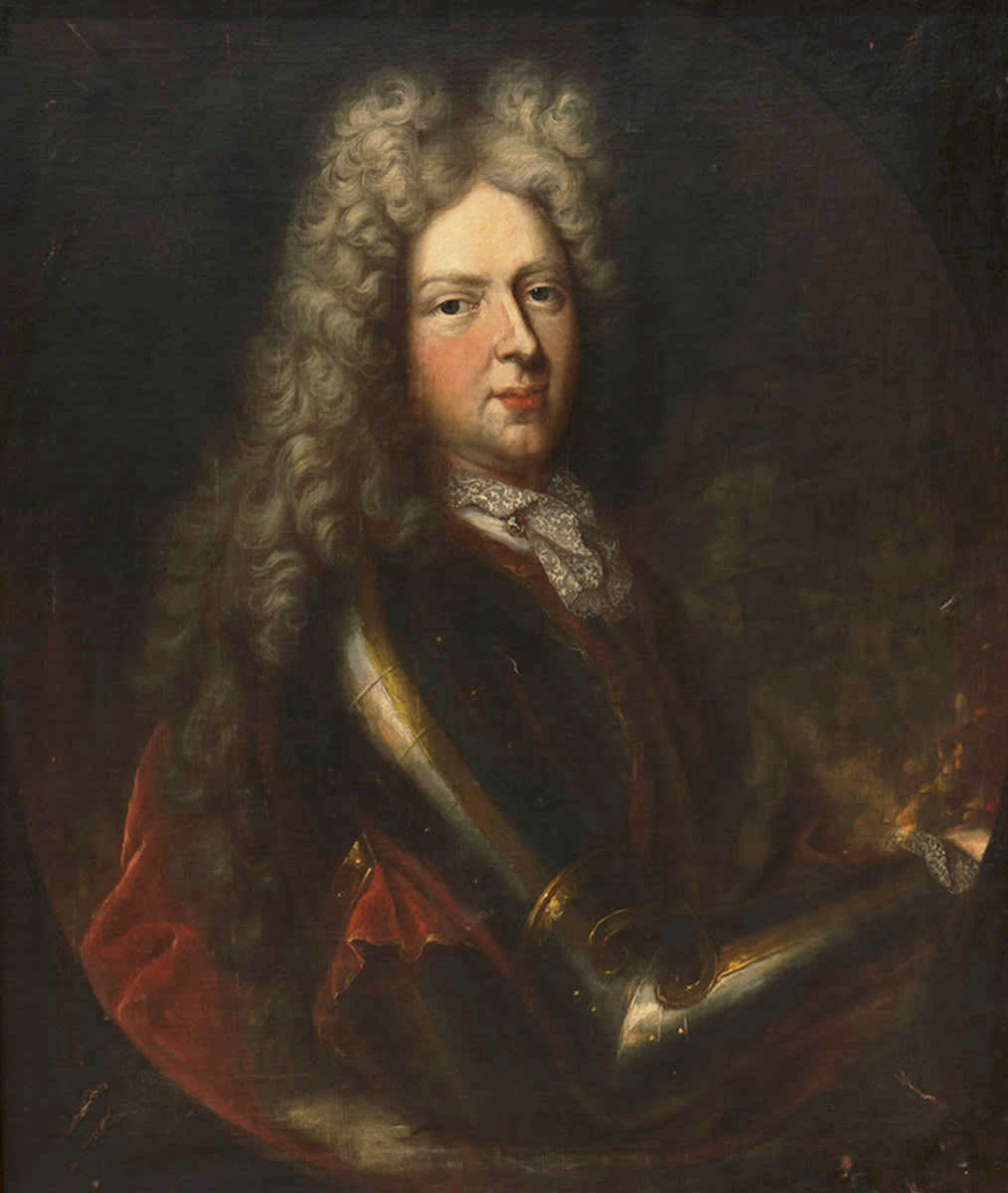
- Portrait by Johann Carl Zierl

Margrave of Brandenburg-Ansbach
- Reign: 16 October 1692 – 29 March 1703
- Predecessor: Christian Albert
- Successor: William Frederick
- Born: 3 May 1678; Ansbach, Margraviate of Brandenburg-Ansbach
- Died: 29 March 1703 (aged 24); Schmidmühlen
- House: Hohenzollern
- Father: John Frederick, Margrave of Brandenburg-Ansbach
- Mother: Johanna Elisabeth of Baden-Durlach

George Frederick II (German: Georg Friedrich II.;3 May 1678 – 29 March 1703), also called George Frederick the Younger (German: der Jüngere), was Margrave of Brandenburg-Ansbach from 6 October 1692 until his death in 1703. He was the third son of John Frederick, Margrave of Brandenburg-Ansbach by his first wife Joanna Elisabeth of Baden-Durlach. George Frederick succeeded his elder brother Christian Albert as Margrave in 1692.

In the War of the Palatinian Succession he fought from 1695 to 1697 as a volunteer in the Imperial Army. During the Spanish War of Succession in 1702 he succeeded in taking the fortress Bersello Modena. He was killed at the Battle of Schmidmühlen in 1703, and as he was unmarried, Ansbach passed to his younger half-brother William Frederick.

== Ancestry ==
Ancestors of George Frederick II

8. Joachim Ernst, Margrave of Brandenburg-Ansbach
4. Albert II, Margrave of Brandenburg-Ansbach
9. Sophie of Solms-Laubach
2. John Frederick, Margrave of Brandenburg-Ansbach
10. Joachim Ernst, Count of Oettingen-Oettingen
5. Sophie Margarete of Oettingen-Oettingen
11. Anna Sibylla of Solms-Sonnenwalde
1. George Frederick II, Margrave of Brandenburg-Ansbach
12. Frederick V, Margrave of Baden-Durlach
6. Frederick VI, Margrave of Baden-Durlach
13. Barbara of Württemberg
3. Johanna Elisabeth of Baden-Durlach
14. John Casimir, Count Palatine of Kleeburg
7. Christina Magdalena of the Palatinate-Zweibrücken
15. Catherine of Sweden

George Frederick II House of Hohenzollern Born: 3 May 1678 Died: 29 March 1703
Preceded by Christian Albert	Margrave of Brandenburg-Ansbach; 1692–1703	Succeeded by William Frederick
