= John Frederick, Margrave of Brandenburg-Ansbach =

John Frederick
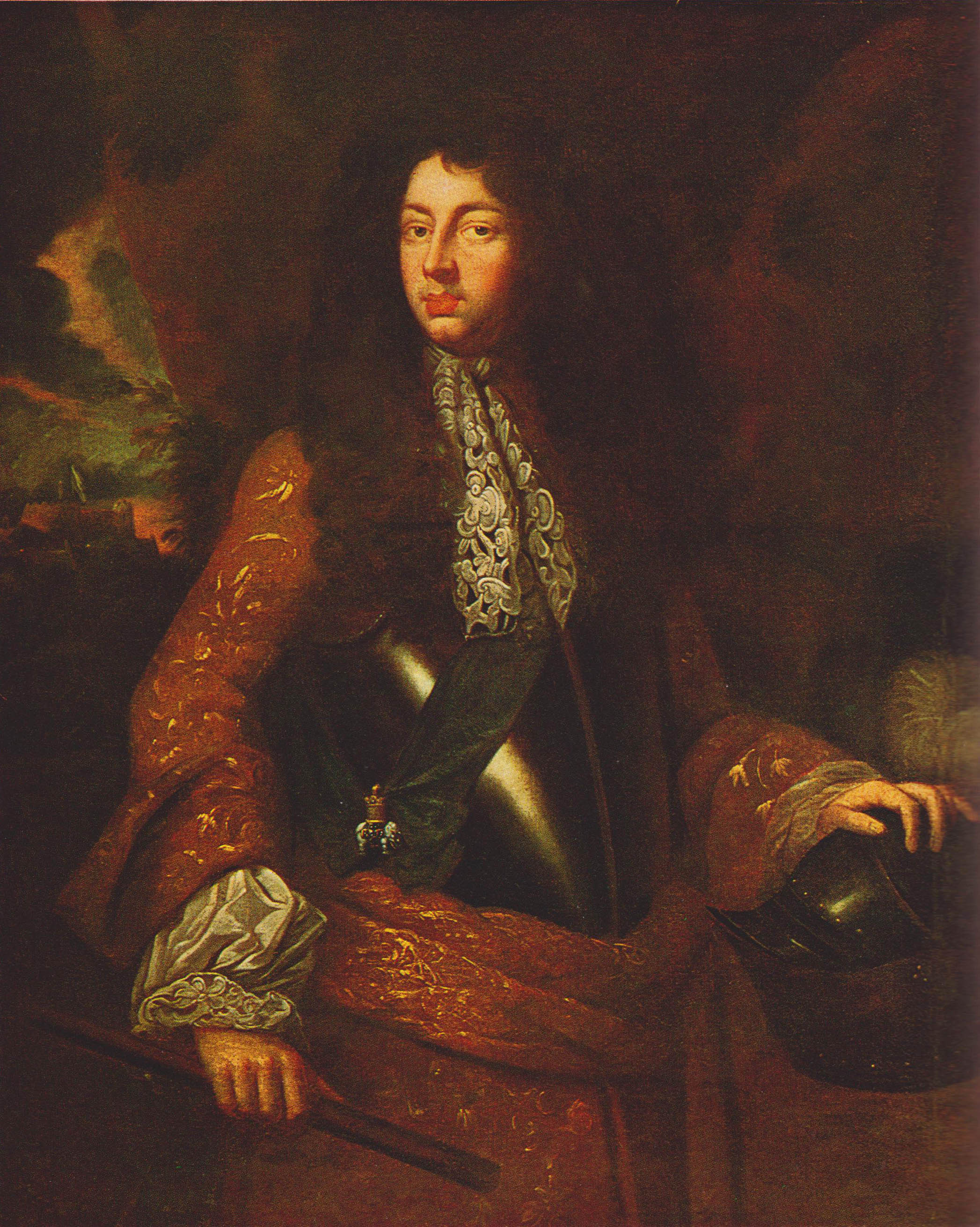
- Portrait c. 1670–80

Margrave of Brandenburg-Ansbach
- Reign: 22 October 1667 – 22 March 1686
- Predecessor: Albert II
- Successor: Christian Albert
- Born: 18 October 1654; Ansbach, Margraviate of Brandenburg-Ansbach
- Died: 22 March 1686 (aged 31); Ansbach, Margraviate of Brandenburg-Ansbach
- Burial: St. Gumbertus
- Spouse: Margravine Johanna Elisabeth of Baden-Durlach (m. 1672; died 1680) Princess Eleonore Erdmuthe of Saxe-Eisenach (m. 1681)
- Issue: Margrave Leopold Frederick; Christian Albert, Margrave of Brandenburg-Ansbach; Dorothea Friederike, Countess of Hanau-Lichtenberg; George Frederick II, Margrave of Brandenburg-Ansbach; Margravine Charlotte Sophie; Caroline, Queen of Great Britain and Ireland; Margrave Frederick Augustus; William Frederick, Margrave of Brandenburg-Ansbach
- House: Hohenzollern
- Father: Albert II, Margrave of Brandenburg-Ansbach
- Mother: Countess Sophie Margarete of Oettingen-Oettingen

John Frederick, Margrave of Brandenburg-Ansbach (18 October 1654 – 22 March 1686) succeeded his father Albert II as margrave of Ansbach in 1667. He married his second wife Princess Eleonore Erdmuthe of Saxe-Eisenach on 4 November 1681. Their daughter Wilhelmine Charlotte Caroline, Margravine of Brandenburg-Ansbach (Caroline of Ansbach) married George II of Great Britain before he became king.

== Issue ==
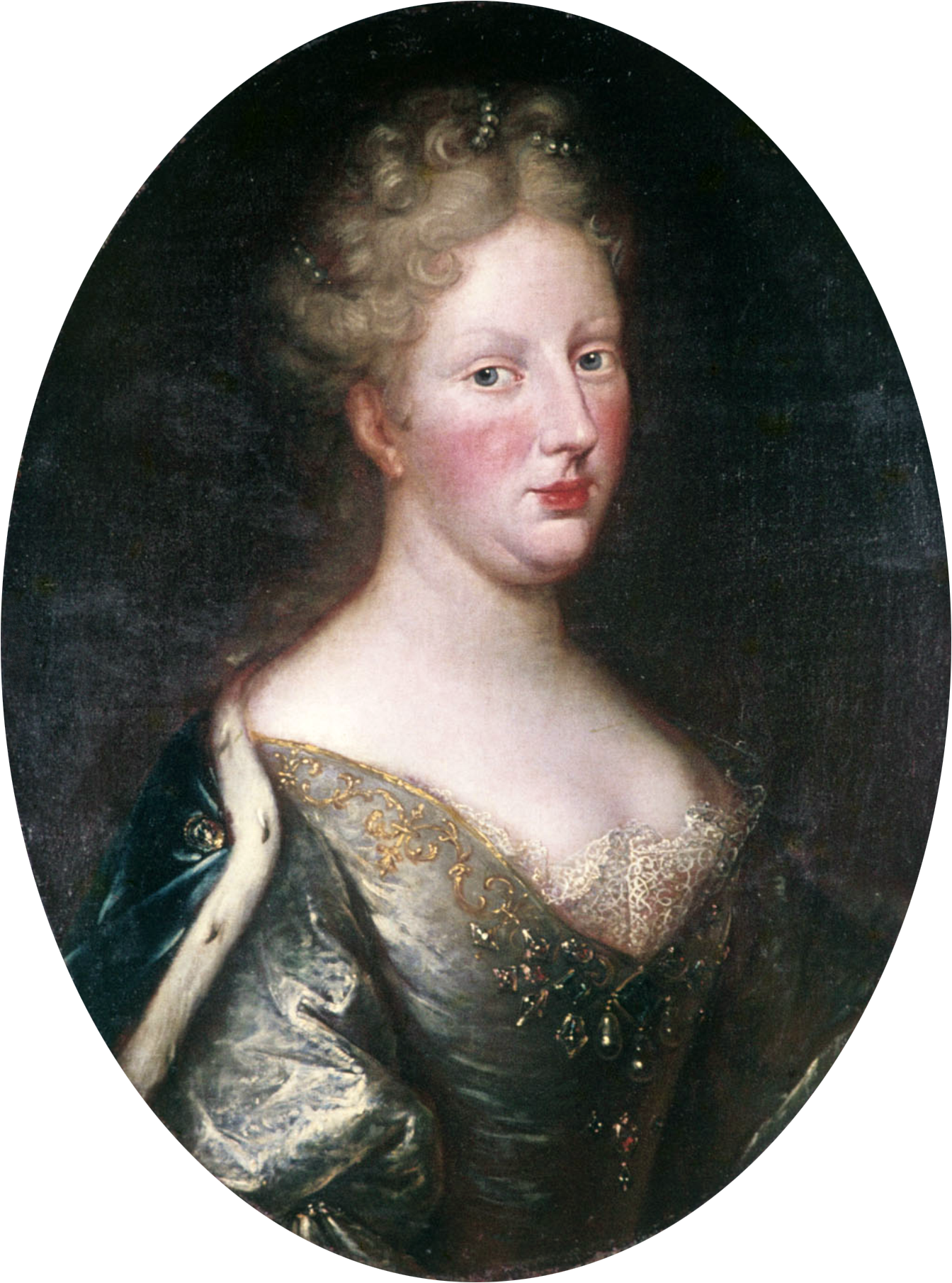
His first wife, Margravine Johanna Elisabeth of Baden-Durlach

By Margravine Johanna Elisabeth of Baden-Durlach, daughter of Frederick VI, Margrave of Baden-Durlach, and his wife Christina Magdalena of the Palatinate-Zweibrücken:

1. Margrave Leopold Frederick of Brandenburg-Ansbach (29 May 1674 – 21 August 1676) died in infancy.
2. Margrave Christian Albert of Brandenburg-Ansbach (18 September 1675 – 16 October 1692) died unmarried.
3. Margravine Dorothea Friederike of Brandenburg-Ansbach (12 August 1676 – 13 March 1731) married Johann Reinhard III of Hanau-Lichtenberg and had issue, including Charlotte of Hanau, wife of Louis VIII, Landgrave of Hesse-Darmstadt
4. Margrave George Frederick of Brandenburg-Ansbach (3 May 1678 – 29 March 1703) died unmarried.
5. Margravine Charlotte Sophie of Brandenburg-Ansbach (29 June 1679 – 24 January 1680) died in infancy.

By Princess Eleonore Erdmuthe of Saxe-Eisenach:

1. Margravine Caroline of Brandenburg-Ansbach (1 March 1683 – 20 November 1737) married George II of Great Britain and had issue.
2. Margrave Frederick Augustus of Brandenburg-Ansbach (3 January 1685 – 30 January 1685) died in infancy.
3. Margrave William Frederick of Brandenburg-Ansbach (8 January 1686 – 7 January 1723) married Duchess Christiane Charlotte of Württemberg, daughter of Frederick Charles, Duke of Württemberg-Winnental and had issue.

== Ancestors ==
Ancestors of John Frederick, Margrave of Brandenburg-Ansbach

8. John George, Elector of Brandenburg
4. Joachim Ernst, Margrave of Brandenburg-Ansbach
9. Elisabeth of Anhalt-Zerbst
2. Albert II, Margrave of Brandenburg-Ansbach
10. John George I of Solms-Laubach
5. Sophie of Solms-Laubach
11. Margaret of Schönburg-Glauchau
1.John Frederick, Margrave of Brandenburg-Ansbach
12. Louis Eberhard, Count of Oettingen-Oettingen
6. Joachim Ernst, Count of Oettingen-Oettingen
13. Margaret of Erbach
3. Sophie Margarete of Oettingen-Oettingen
14. Henry William I, Count of Solms-Sonnenwalde
7. Anna Sibylla of Solms-Sonnenwalde
15. Sophia Dorothea of Mansfeld-Arnstein

== Notes and sources ==
John Frederick, Margrave of Brandenburg-Ansbach House of Hohenzollern Born: 18 October 1654 Died: 22 March 1686
Preceded by Albert V	Margrave of Brandenburg-Ansbach; 1667–1686	Succeeded by Christian Albert
