= Principality of Ansbach =

Free Imperial principality in the Holy Roman Empire (1398–1791)

Principality of Ansbach / Margraviate of Brandenburg-Ansbach Fürstentum Ansbach / Markgrafschaft Brandenburg-Ansbach (German)
- 1398–1791
- Coat of arms

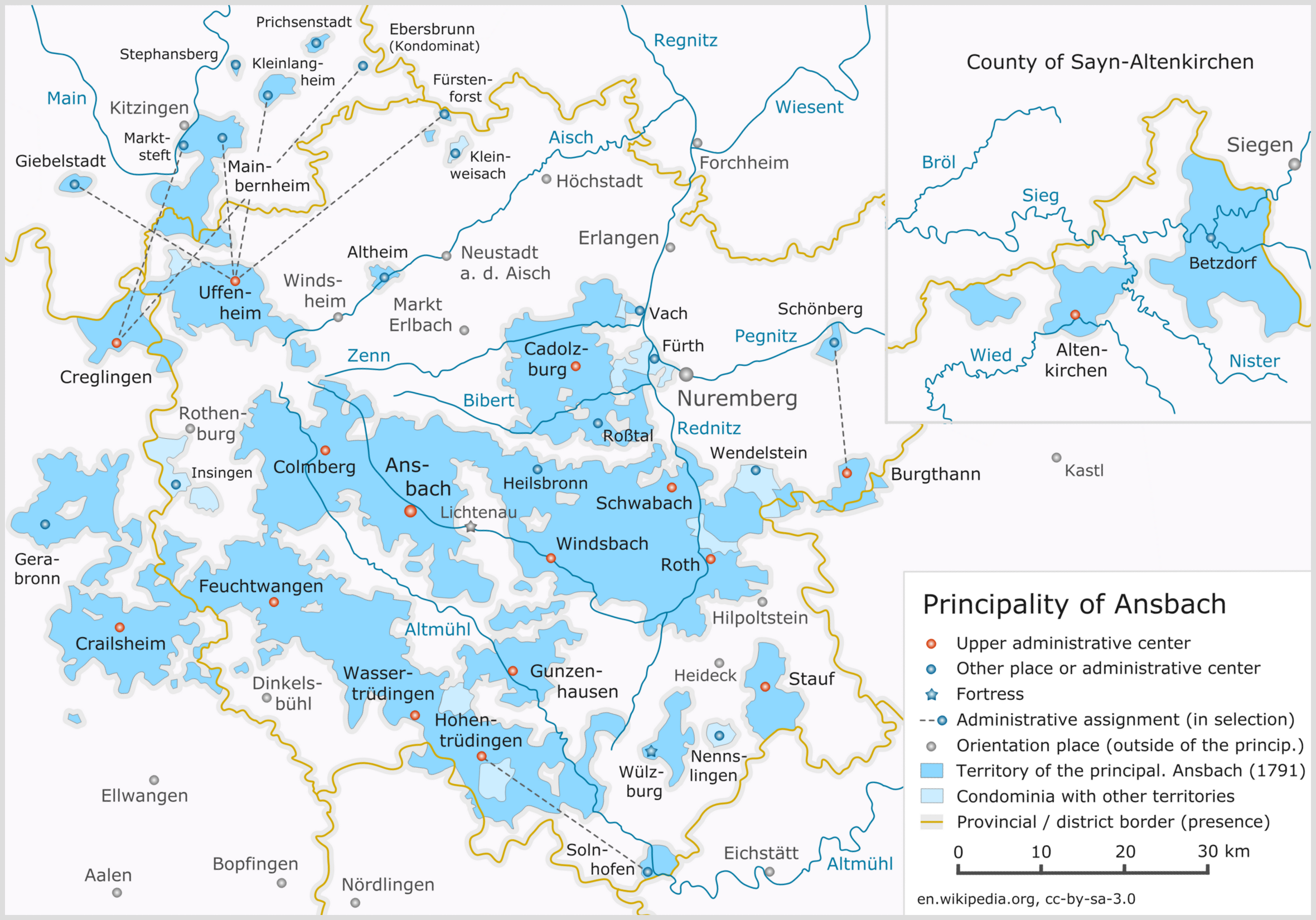
- The Principality of Brandenburg-Ansbach as of 1791, superimposed over modern borders.
- Status: Principality
- Capital: Ansbach
- Common languages: East Franconian
- Religion: Roman Catholic
- Historical era: Early modern period
  - Nuremberg became imperial city: 1219
  - Partition of burgraviate: 21 January 1398
  - Personal union with Brandenburg: 1415–40
  - Reunion with Bayreuth: 11 June 1420
  - Repartition: 21 September 1440
  - Restoration of personal union: 1470–86
  - Margraviate sold to Prussia: 2 December 1791
  - Formal annexation: 28 January 1792
Preceded by	Succeeded by
Burgraviate of Nuremberg	Kingdom of Prussia
- Today part of: Germany

The Principality of Ansbach or Margraviate of Brandenburg-Ansbach (German: Fürstentum Ansbach or Markgrafschaft Brandenburg-Ansbach) was a free imperial principality in the Holy Roman Empire centered on the Franconian city of Ansbach. The ruling Hohenzollern princes of the land were known as margraves, as their ancestors were margraves (so the principality was a margraviate but not a march).

== History ==
The principality was established following the death of Frederick V, Burgrave of Nuremberg, on 21 January 1398. By agreement, his lands were partitioned between his two sons, a process that took more than two years. The younger son, Frederick VI, received Ansbach and the elder, John III, received Bayreuth. After John III's death on 11 June 1420, the two principalities were reunited under Frederick VI, who had become Elector Frederick I of Brandenburg in 1415.

On 21 September 1440, almost three years after Frederick's death his territories were divided between his sons; John received the principality of Bayreuth (Brandenburg-Kulmbach), Frederick received Brandenburg, and Albert received Ansbach. Thereafter Ansbach was held by cadet branches of the House of Hohenzollern, and its rulers were commonly called Margraves of Brandenburg-Ansbach.

On 2 December 1791, the reigning Prince and Margrave of Ansbach, Charles Alexander, who had also succeeded to Bayreuth, sold the sovereignty of his principalities to King Frederick William II of Prussia. The Margrave was middle-aged and childless, and Frederick William was his kinsman as the head of the House of Hohenzollern. The Margrave moved to England with his English second wife. Ansbach was formally annexed on 28 January 1792.

== Princes and Margraves of Ansbach ==
- 1398: Frederick VI, Burgrave of Nuremberg (from 1415 also Elector of Brandenburg)
- 1440: Albert Achilles (from 1470 also Elector of Brandenburg)
- 1486: Frederick I
- 1515: George the Pious
- 1543: George Frederick I
- 1603: Joachim Ernst
- 1625: Frederick III, Margrave of Brandenburg-Ansbach
- 1634: Albert II
- 1667: John Frederick
- 1686: Christian Albrecht
- 1692: George Frederick II the Younger
- 1703: William Frederick (before 1686–1723)
- 1723: Charles William Frederick (1712–1757)
- 1757: Charles Alexander (to 1791)

== See also ==
- Germans in the American Revolution § Ansbach-Bayreuth
- Wolf of Ansbach
