= Princess Amelia's Battery =

18th century artillery battery in Gibraltar

- Part of Fortifications of Gibraltar
- Upper Rock Nature Reserve, Gibraltar
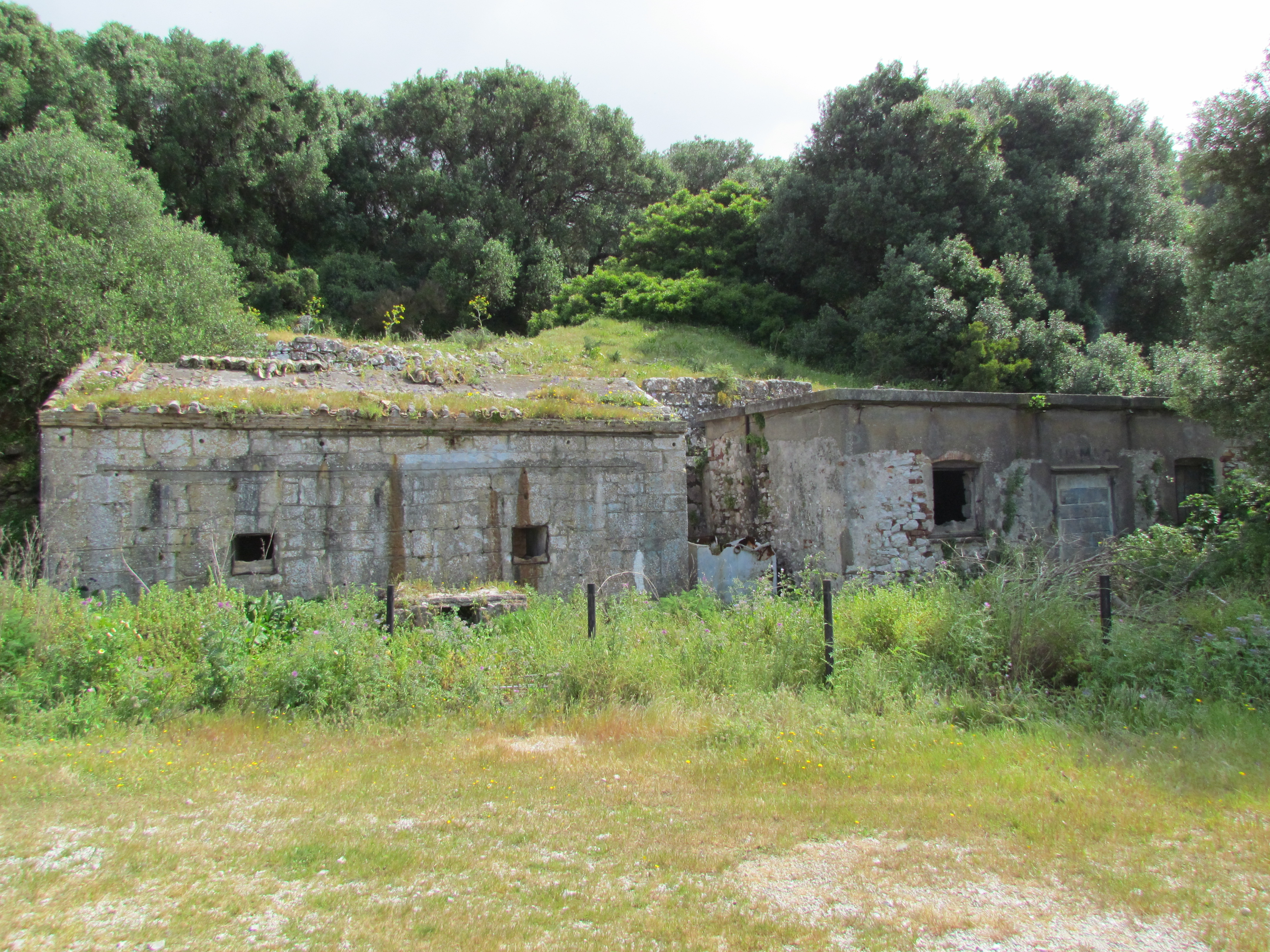
- Two remaining buildings at Princess Amelia's Battery

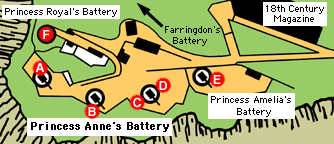
- Diagram of Princess Amelia's and Princess Anne's Batteries with north to the left. E - Gun No. 4 of Princess Anne's Battery

Site information
- Owner: Government of Gibraltar
- Condition: Poor

Location
- Location of Princess Amelia's Battery in Gibraltar
- Coordinates: 36.145334°N 5.347271°W

Site history
- Built: 1732

Princess Amelia's Battery is an artillery battery in the British Overseas Territory of Gibraltar. It is located on Willis's Plateau at the northern end of the Upper Rock Nature Reserve, adjacent to Gun No. 4 of Princess Anne's Battery. It was named after Princess Amelia of Great Britain, the second daughter of George II. It was formerly referred to as the 2nd Willis's Battery. The plateau and its batteries had previously been named after an artillery officer by the name of Willis who was outstanding during the capture of Gibraltar in 1704. Princess Amelia's Battery saw action during the Great Siege of Gibraltar, during which it sustained substantial damage. Little remains of the original site, aside from two derelict buildings. The battery is listed with the Gibraltar Heritage Trust.

== Early history ==
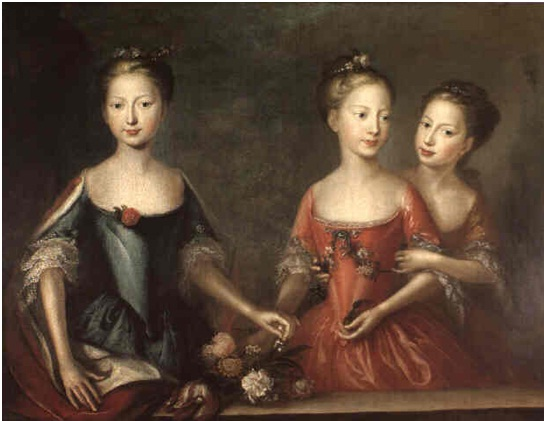
The daughters of King George II (Anne, Amelia, and Caroline), after whom three batteries in Gibraltar were named

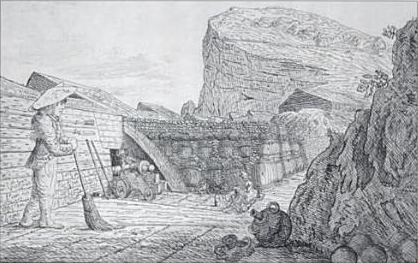
Princess Amelia's Battery, c. 1780 by gun depression carriage designer George Koehler.

Princess Amelia's Battery is in Gibraltar, the British Overseas Territory at the southern end of the Iberian Peninsula. The artillery battery is located on Willis's Plateau at the northern end of the Upper Rock Nature Reserve, above Princess Caroline's Battery and adjacent to the fourth gun of Princess Anne's Battery. Both Princess Amelia's Battery and the adjacent Gun No. 4 are on higher ground than that of Guns No. 1 through 3 of Princess Anne's Battery.

The site was initially known as the 2nd Willis's Battery. The Willis's Batteries were constructed at the area of the former Reduto (English: Redoubt) de San Joachim, at an elevation of 440 feet above the isthmus. During the capture of Gibraltar in 1704, an artillery officer by the name of Willis was outstanding in his manning of the guns. To honor the officer, the Batteries of San Joachim and the Bastion of San Jose were renamed Willis's. The site was renamed again after Princess Amelia (1711 – 1786), the second daughter of King George II. The proximity of the battery to Princess Anne's Battery is such that the latter is sometimes mistakenly referred to as Princess Amelia's Battery. Princess Amelia's Battery was one of several on Willis's Plateau that also included Princess Anne's Battery and Princess Royal's Battery.

Princess Amelia's Battery was first armed in 1732. Three decades later, during the Spanish War of 1762, there were six cannons at the battery, four 6-pounders and two 9-pounders. By 1771, Princess Amelia's Battery had five embrasures directed in front and three additional cannons. There were half a dozen guns behind embrasures by 1773. Several years later, during the Great Siege of Gibraltar, many of the emplacements on Willis's Plateau, including those of Princess Amelia's Battery, sustained severe damage. Of the fortifications of Gibraltar, the batteries on Willis's Plateau received the brunt of the attack from the Spanish during the siege. Gilbard and Drinkwater Bethune, among others, related the story of a shot which found its way through an embrasure in Princess Amelia's Battery, hitting four of the soldiers, and amputating between three and seven lower extremities in the process, depending on the source.

== Recent history ==
Two derelict buildings remain at the site of Princess Amelia's Battery, which is listed with the Gibraltar Heritage Trust.
