= Princess Caroline's Battery =

Gun battery on the Rock of Gibraltar

- Part of Fortifications of Gibraltar
- Upper Rock Nature Reserve, Gibraltar
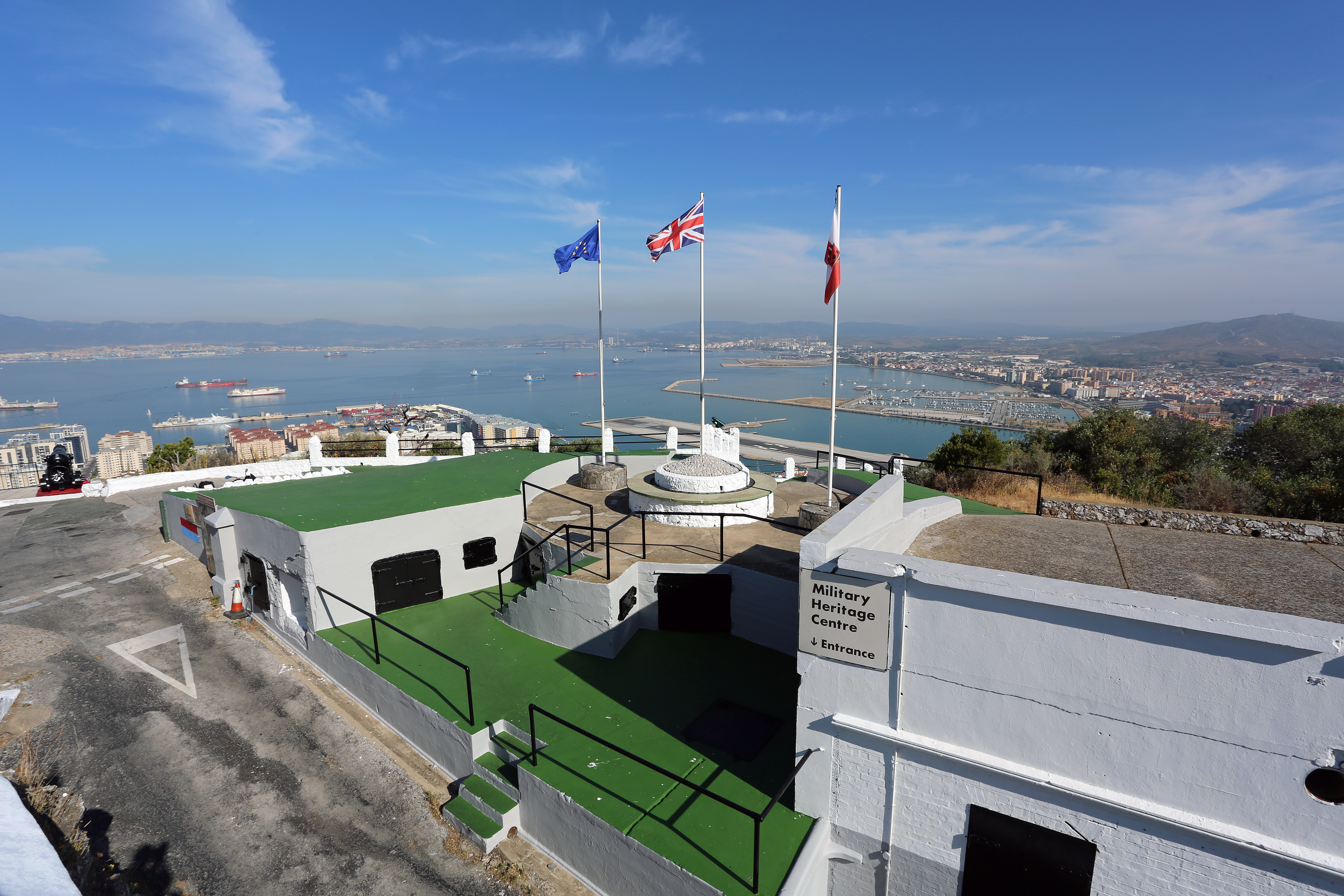
- Princess Caroline's Battery at the Upper Rock Nature Reserve

Site information
- Type: Artillery battery
- Owner: Government of Gibraltar
- Open to the public: Yes
- Condition: Good

Location
- Location of Princess Caroline's Battery in Gibraltar
- Coordinates: 36.144802°N 5.347934°W

Site history
- Built: 1732
- In use: Decommissioned; Houses the Military Heritage Centre

Princess Caroline's Battery is an artillery battery in the British Overseas Territory of Gibraltar. It is located at the northern end of the Upper Rock Nature Reserve, at the junction of Willis's Road and Queen's Road. The nearby Princess Anne's Battery is often mistakenly referred to as Princess Caroline's Battery. The latter was built in 1732 and named after Princess Caroline, the daughter of King George II. Princess Caroline's Battery was updated in 1905, and a 6 inch Mark VII gun was mounted above the magazine. Later, the battery was decommissioned and the gun removed. The underground magazine is now home to the Military Heritage Centre, which includes the Memorial Chamber.

== History ==
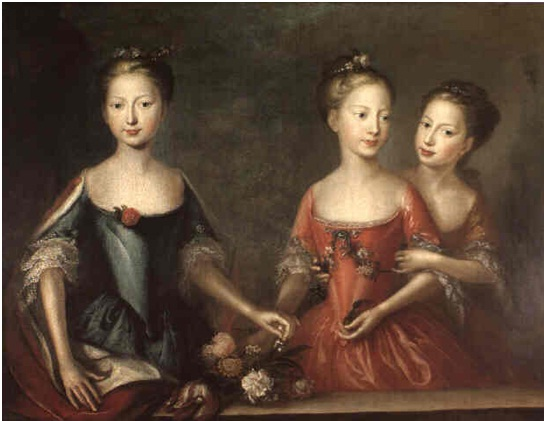
The daughters of King George II (Anne, Amelia, and Caroline), after whom three batteries in Gibraltar were named

Princess Caroline's Battery (pictured at right) is in Gibraltar, the British Overseas Territory at the southern end of the Iberian Peninsula. The artillery battery is located at the northern end of the Upper Rock Nature Reserve, above the Moorish Castle and below Princess Anne's Battery. The site is at the junction of Willis's Road and Queen's Road, and is accessed from town via the former. It was constructed in 1732 and named after Princess Caroline of Great Britain (pictured at left), the third daughter of King George II. Princess Anne's Battery is often mistakenly referred to as Princess Caroline's Battery, because access to the former is through the junction with Willis's Road, adjacent to the latter battery.

The battery saw action during the Great Siege of Gibraltar and required repairs. In 1871, the battery featured a 9-inch rifled muzzle loading gun, with an Elswick Ordnance Company carriage and platform. In 1905, the battery was refurbished to accommodate the 6 inch Mark VII gun (pictured below) that was installed on top of the magazine. While the battery has been decommissioned and the gun removed, the same hoists (pictured below) that were utilised to arm the weapon are still present. The explosive charges that propelled the 6 inch gun's shells were housed in a room with three small interior windows. Lanterns in the windows illuminated the cartridge storage chamber without the risks inherent with an open flame. The explosive charges were passed through the dispensing hatch (pictured below) at the floor level and were then raised by a hoist to those manning the gun. In order to avoid the danger of an inadvertent explosion caused by a spark, soldiers changed their clothes in an adjacent annex, and even wore special footwear.

== Military Heritage Centre ==
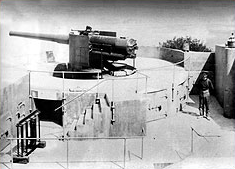
The 6 inch gun on top of the magazine at Princess Caroline's Battery in Gibraltar

The Military Heritage Centre at Princess Caroline's Battery is a small underground exhibition centre. In addition to relics from the battery, the facility is home to the Memorial Chamber. The relics exhibited date from the eighteenth century to the present, and include weapons, shells, and other artefacts. The Memorial Chamber features the roll call of those regiments deployed to Gibraltar since the early eighteenth century. In addition, the ensigns of the Royal Air Force and the Royal Navy are displayed in the Memorial Chamber (pictured below). There is also a monument which commemorates British Regiments. While no names are listed on the monument, the dedication is inscribed on its face: "Dedicated To The Memory Of All Those Who Have Made The Supreme Sacrifice In Defence Of Gibraltar."

== Twenty-first century ==
Princess Caroline's Battery is listed with the Gibraltar Heritage Trust. The site is under the supervision of the Gibraltar Tourist Board, although its day-to-day operation is licensed to a private company. The arrangement is similar to that for O'Hara's Battery, although the latter was opened more recently to the public, in 2010.

In May 2011, Princess Caroline's Battery and Princess Anne's Battery were the themes of the 22nd annual painting contest sponsored by the Gibraltar Heritage Trust. Prizes were awarded to the winners of the competition by the Governor of Gibraltar Sir Adrian Johns.

== Gallery ==
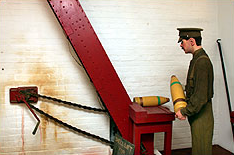
Military Heritage Centre, with an original hoist used to arm the gun above the magazine

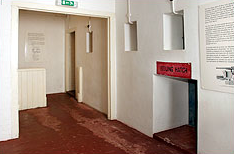
Military Heritage Centre, with annex to the left and cartridge storage room to the right

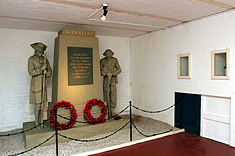
Memorial Chamber in the Military Heritage Centre, formerly the cartridge storage room
