= Princess Anne's Battery =

Artillery battery in the British Overseas Territory of Gibraltar

- Part of Fortifications of Gibraltar
- Upper Rock Nature Reserve, Gibraltar
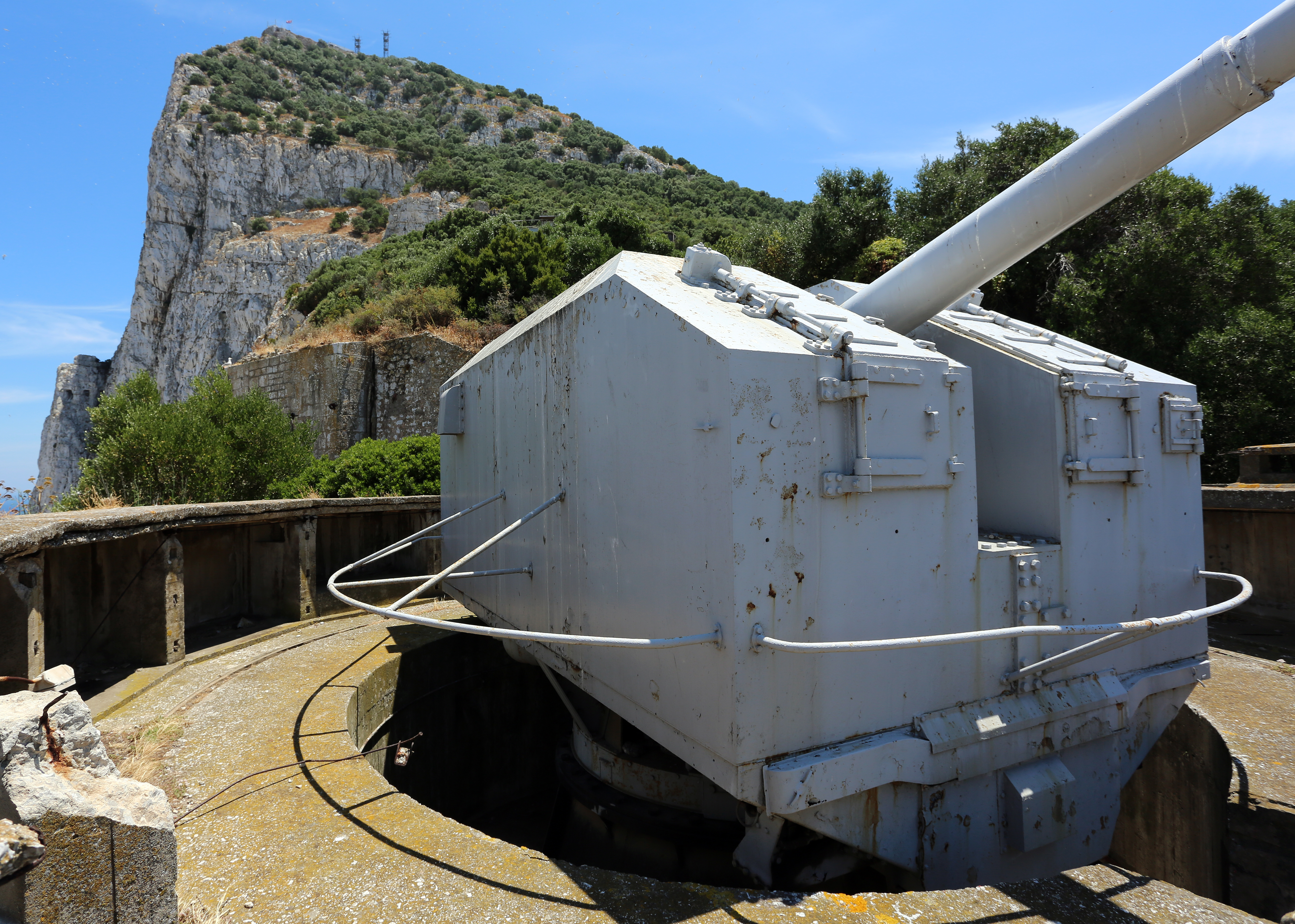
- One of four guns at Princess Anne's Battery, with the Rock in background

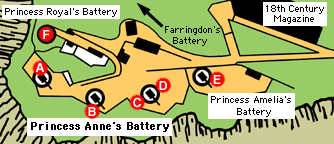
- Diagram of Princess Anne's Battery with north to the left A-Gun 1, B-Gun 2, C and D-Gun 3, E-Gun 4

Site information
- Type: Artillery battery
- Condition: Good

Location
- Location of Princess Anne's Battery in Gibraltar
- Coordinates: 36.145982°N 5.346789°W

Site history
- Built: 1732
- In use: Decommissioned late 20th Century

Princess Anne's Battery is an artillery battery in the British Overseas Territory of Gibraltar. It is located on Willis's Plateau at the northern end of the Upper Rock Nature Reserve, below Princess Caroline's Battery. It was named after Anne, Princess Royal and Princess of Orange, the eldest daughter of George II. However, its name is often confused with those of other batteries in the area. In 1732, guns were first mounted on the battery, which also saw action during the Great Siege of Gibraltar. Princess Anne's Battery was updated in the nineteenth and twentieth centuries, with the latter modernisation entailing the installation of four QF 5.25 inch guns with both anti-aircraft and coastal defence capabilities. The battery was manned into the early 1980s, after which it was decommissioned. The guns were refurbished in the early twenty-first century, and represent the world's only intact battery of 5.25 inch anti-aircraft guns. Princess Anne's and Amelia’s Battery are listed with the Gibraltar Heritage Trust.

== Early history ==
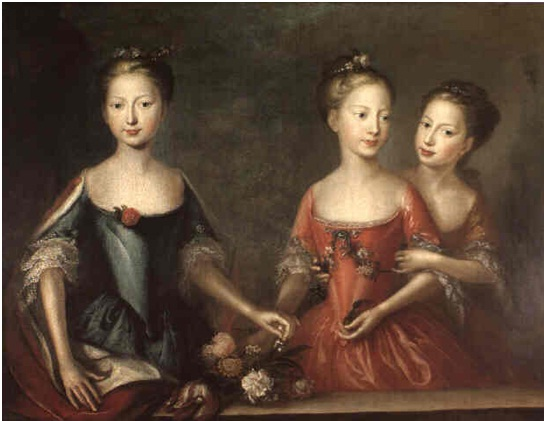
The daughters of King George II (Anne, Amelia, and Caroline), after whom three batteries in Gibraltar were named

Princess Anne's Battery is in Gibraltar, the British Overseas Territory at the southern end of the Iberian Peninsula. The artillery battery is located on Willis's Plateau at the northern end of the Upper Rock Nature Reserve, below the Great Siege Tunnels and above Princess Caroline's Battery. It overlooks Spain, Gibraltar International Airport, and the Bay of Gibraltar. The site was initially known as the 3rd Willis's Battery. It was renamed after Anne, Princess Royal (1709 – 1759), the eldest daughter of King George II, also known as Princess Anne of Orange following her marriage to William IV, Prince of Orange. The battery's position off Willis's Road near Princess Caroline's Battery is thought to be responsible for it frequently being mistaken for that battery. It is also sometimes referred to as St. Anne's Battery, or confused with Princess Amelia's Battery or Princess Royal's Battery, with the first a misnomer and the latter two in close proximity to the Princess Anne's Battery site.

The battery was built in 1732, with the guns mounted at that time consisting of five 12 pounders. In 1771, it was reported that Princess Anne's Battery had five cannons directed toward the isthmus, and another four to address "the rear of the enemy approaches." It was in use at the time of the Great Siege of Gibraltar, and an explosion of the magazine at Princess Anne's Battery on 11 June 1782 took the lives of fourteen men. The following August, the flank of the battery was rebuilt. Later, in the nineteenth century, the battery was updated with four 3 inch guns and three 13 inch mortars. During the mid twentieth century, Princess Anne's Battery was refurbished. While the decision was made in 1942 to arm it with new guns, it wasn't until 1956 that four new QF 5.25 inch guns serving a dual role had been installed on the battery. They performed both anti-aircraft and coastal defense functions and featured completely enclosed turrets, with a 1 B mounting. The four guns are partially surrounded by concrete rings which contain ammunition lockers. Three of the emplacements feature concrete bunkers with partially sunken magazines and engine rooms off to the side, while the fourth's magazine and engine room are completely subterranean. Gun No. 4 is on somewhat higher ground than the first three guns. It is also immediately adjacent to the site of Princess Amelia's Battery.

== Recent history ==
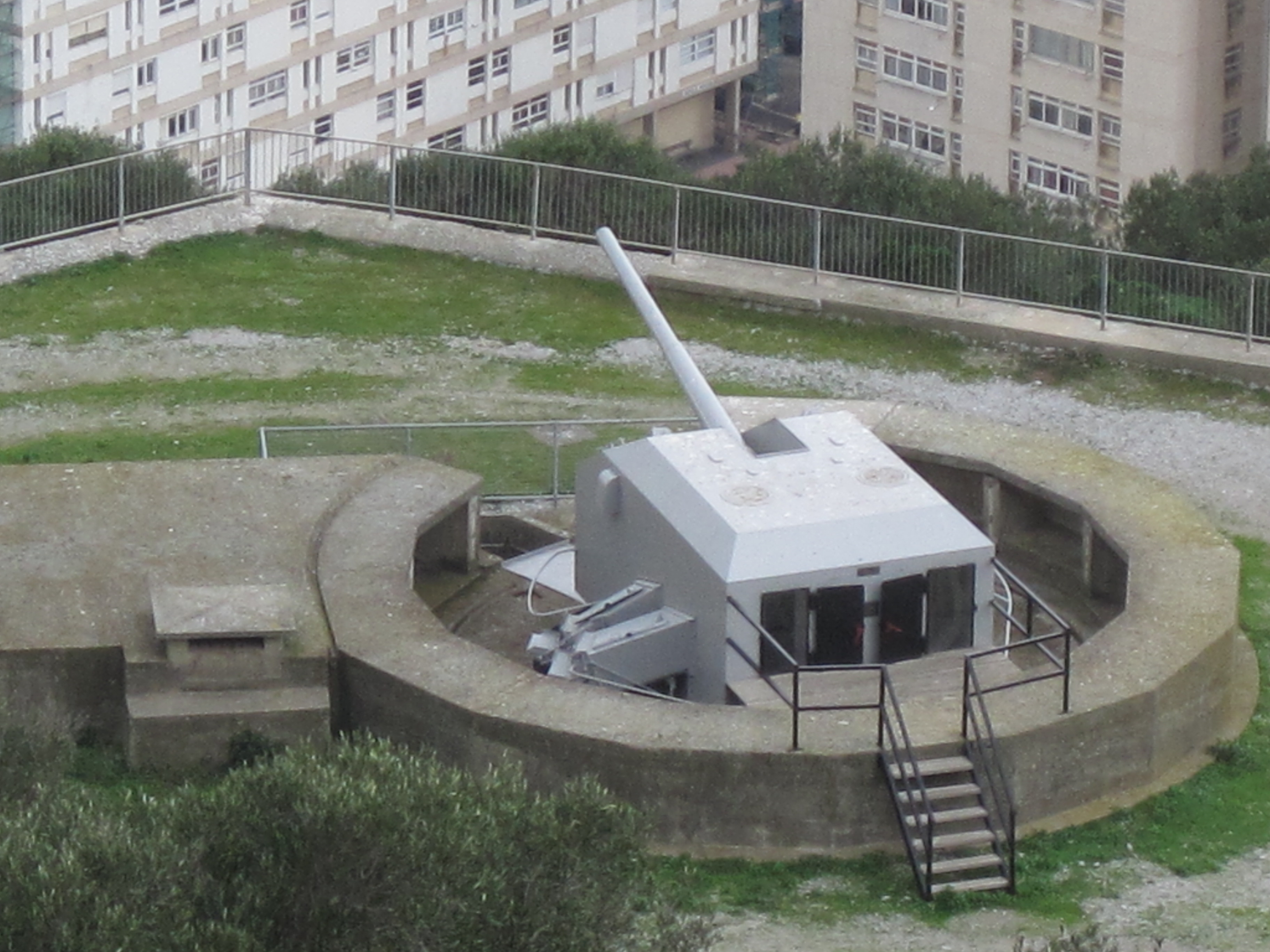
One of the emplacements at Princess Anne's Battery on Willis's Plateau

Princess Anne's Battery was staffed and operational into the early 1980s. Since then, the guns have been decommissioned and have sustained the effects of weather and vandalism. Accordingly, security measures now prevent easy access to the site, which is not routinely open to the public. Rather, access is arranged through the Gibraltar Tourist Board. At the turn of the twenty-first century, it was proposed that the area be developed as a tourist attraction. While improvements were made to the area, ultimately opposition to the suggestion put the plans on hold. The guns have been repainted since. The restoration of gun No. 3 at Princess Anne's Battery was performed in two phases, in July 2006 and September 2007. The 2006 refurbishment was undertaken by members of the 106 (Yeomanry) Regiment of the Royal Artillery during exercise Marble Tor 5. The 2007 restoration was performed by the 101 Battalion of the Corps of Royal Electrical and Mechanical Engineers (Volunteers) during exercise Marble Tor 6.

In 2008, retired Major David Seed received a special commendation during the presentation of Heritage Awards by the Gibraltar Heritage Trust. His award acknowledged the role he played in arranging the annual Marble Tor exercises that involved refurbishment of heritage sites, including not only Princess Anne's Battery, but also Flat Bastion Magazine, Parson's Lodge Battery, Witham's Cemetery, and the 100 ton gun. In May 2011, the Gibraltar Heritage Trust sponsored the 22nd annual painting contest. Princess Anne's Battery and Princess Caroline's Battery were the themes of the competition, whose winners were awarded prizes by the Governor of Gibraltar, Sir Adrian Johns. Princess Anne's Battery is listed with the Gibraltar Heritage Trust, and represents the world's only complete battery of 5.25 inch anti-aircraft guns.

== Gallery ==
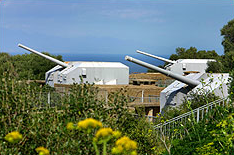
Princess Anne's Battery, Upper Rock Nature Reserve

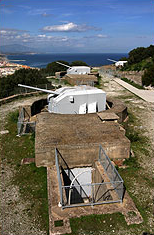
Gun No. 3 at Princess Anne's Battery in Gibraltar, partially sunken magazine

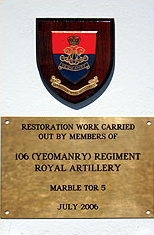
Plaque on Gun No. 3 at Princess Anne's Battery for 2006 Restoration

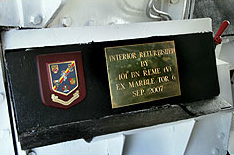
Plaque on Gun No. 3 at Princess Anne's Battery for 2007 Restoration

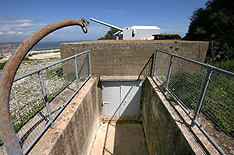
Gun No. 1 at Princess Anne's Battery with a davit for lowering ammunition
