= Princess Royal's Battery =

Artillery battery in Gibraltar

- Part of Fortifications of Gibraltar
- Upper Rock Nature Reserve, Gibraltar
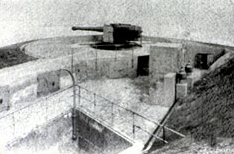
- Princess Royal's Battery in 1903 with 6 inch BL Mark VII gun

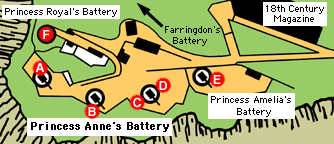
- Map of a portion of Willis's Plateau, including Princess Anne's Battery, Princess Amelia's Battery, Willis' Magazine and Princess Royal's Battery

Site information
- Type: Artillery battery
- Owner: Government of Gibraltar

Location
- Location of Princess Royal's Battery in Gibraltar
- Coordinates: 36.146180°N 5.346166°W

Site history
- Built: c. 1705
- In use: Decommissioned

Princess Royal's Battery is an artillery battery in the British Overseas Territory of Gibraltar. It is located on Willis's Plateau at the northern end of the Upper Rock Nature Reserve, just southeast of Princess Anne's Battery. Formerly known as Willis' Battery, and later, Queen Anne's Battery or Queen's Battery, it was renamed in the late 18th century after Charlotte, Princess Royal, the eldest daughter of George III. The battery was active from the early 18th century until at least the mid-20th century. However, it has been decommissioned and guns are no longer present. Princess Royal's Battery is listed with the Gibraltar Heritage Trust.

== Early history ==
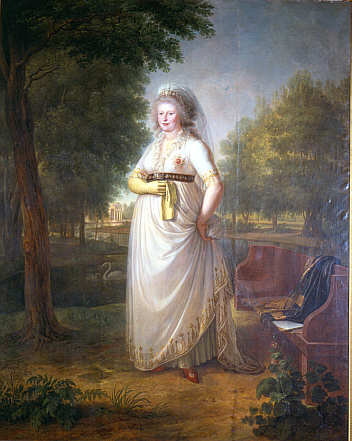
Charlotte, Princess Royal

Princess Royal's Battery is in Gibraltar, the British Overseas Territory at the southern end of the Iberian Peninsula. The artillery battery is one of several located on Willis's Plateau, named after a British artillery officer commended for his actions during the capture of Gibraltar in 1704. During the early 18th century, the batteries on that plateau were referred to as the Willis's Batteries. Princess Royal's Battery is positioned at the northern end of the Upper Rock Nature Reserve, southeast of Princess Anne's Battery, and in proximity to the entrance to the Middle Galleries, the 18th century tunnels.

While referred to in the early 18th century as Willis's Battery, it was later known as Queen Anne's Battery or Queen's Battery. After the Great Siege of Gibraltar (1779–1783), it was again renamed after Charlotte, Princess Royal (1766–1828), the eldest daughter of King George III (1738–1820) and Queen Charlotte (1744–1818). In 1797, at age 30, the Princess Royal married Frederick, the Crown Prince of Wurttemberg (1754–1816).

The battery was constructed about 1705, "upon the second declivity" at the north end of the Rock of Gibraltar. It had a fan-like plan and, in 1727, featured twelve guns. At that time, "nearly all the guns in Willis's were six-pounders, and in the journal of the siege it is mentioned that a three-pounder in Queen Anne's battery did great execution in the enemy's works." That year, the guns at Queen's Anne's Battery were sufficiently effective during the thirteenth siege of Gibraltar that the Spanish officers were prompted to devise a plan to silence them. They started a mine in a cave below the battery, the intent being to excavate a chamber directly below the battery, load it with explosives, and blow it up. However, the undertaking required a great deal of labour. Not only was the rock hard, but the mine was started at a considerable height, close to the battery, not at the base of the Rock. The effort was ultimately unsuccessful.

In February 1782, Princess Royal Battery was the site of the first use of Lieutenant George Koehler's depressing gun-carriage. This allowed the angle of the gun to be aimed down at an angle of seventy degrees. This enabled the defending soldiers to take advantage of the height of the Rock of Gibraltar. It was ingenious because the sliding carriage allowed the gun to recoil without sending the gun carriage into the air. This idea was later built into more conventional gun carriages. Colonel John Drinkwater in his accounts claimed that the gun hit its target 28 times out of 30 when aimed at the Spaniard's San Carlos Battery.

In August 1782, during the Great Siege of Gibraltar, the Garrison strengthened the works at Willis's Plateau, and orders went out for the Princess Royal's Battery "to be caissoned with ship-timber."

In the period from 1834 to 1859, Princess Royal's Battery had nine 24-pounders. However, four years later, by 1863, the guns had been switched out for two 7-inch (180 mm) rifled breech loaders and seven 32-pounders. There were further changes later that century. The battery mounted five 64-pounder rifled muzzle loading guns in 1885 and three of the same in 1889. About that time, a proposal was made to mount a 6-inch breech loading Mark IV gun. A drawing (pictured below) made of Princess Royal's Battery in 1895 includes not only the 6-inch emplacement, but also Gun No. 1 of Princess Anne's Battery.

== Recent history ==
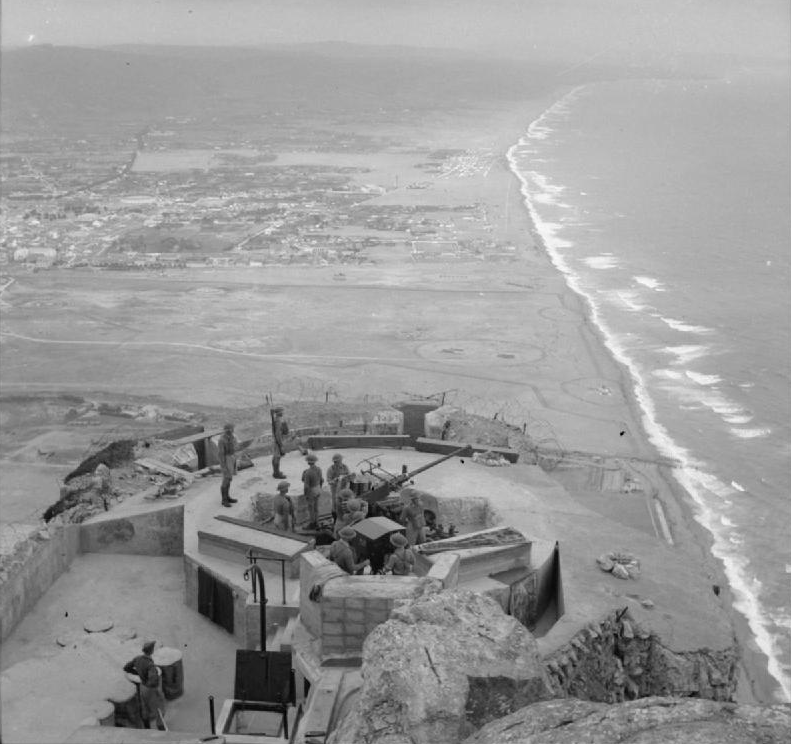
Princess Royal's Battery with Bofors 40 mm L/60 gun AA gun, 17 Nov 1941

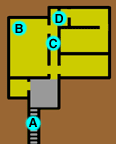
Underground layout of Princess Royal's Battery

In 1901, approval had been given for two 6-inch (152 mm) guns at Princess Royal's Battery. One emplacement was to have a range of 6,000 yards (5,500 m), to bear on the enemy's land batteries. The other was to feature double the range, 12,000 yards (11,000 m), to target vessels on the Mediterranean. On 21 July 1902, work began on a 6-inch breech loading Mark VII gun with barbette armour. By November 1903, that 6-inch BL Mark VII gun had been mounted, as documented in a photograph (pictured above) of that date, with the installation finished by 24 May 1904. In December 1915, the second 6-inch breech loading Mark VII gun was mounted on the battery. It is believed to have stayed there until about 1924–1925. By World War II, at least one gun was still present, a Bofors 40 mm L/60 gun anti-aircraft gun, as documented in an Imperial War Museum photograph (pictured at left).

The battery features subterranean, bombproof storage areas for shells and cartridges. Underground, there are also shell hoists and a room for the gun crew. The largest room inside the entrance to the left has sustained heavy vandalism (B in diagram). A central hallway runs the length of the underground complex (C). Interior windows, lighting holes, along that corridor helped to avoid the risk of interaction of flame and gunpowder (D). Wooden doors at the entrance of the shell storage room are extant, but their condition was poor as of 2005 (E).

Princess Royal's Battery is protected as a listed building under the Gibraltar Heritage Trust Act 1989.

== Gallery ==
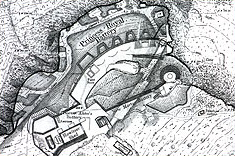
1895 drawing of battery incl. Gun No.1 of Princess Anne's Battery

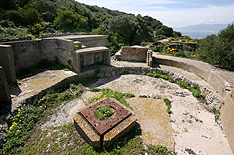
2005 exterior view of Princess Royal's Battery upper level

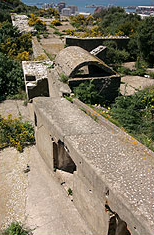
2005 exterior view of Princess Royal's Battery upper level

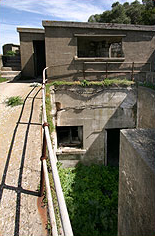
2005 exterior view of Princess Royal's Battery upper and lower levels

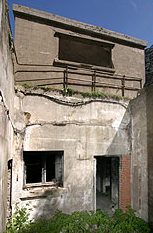
2005 exterior view of battery's underground complex, (A) in diagram
