= Willis' Magazine =

- Part of Fortifications of Gibraltar
- Willis' Plateau, Gibraltar
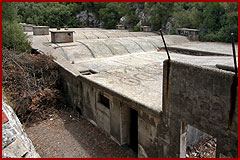
- The outside

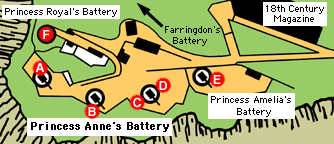
- Map of a portion of Willis's Plateau, including Princess Royal's Battery, Princess Anne's Battery, Princess Amelia's Battery and Willis' Magazine

Site information
- Type: Magazine
- Owner: Government of Gibraltar

Location
- Coordinates: 36.145054°N 5.346867°W

Willis' Magazine is an 18th-century large magazine in the British Overseas Territory of Gibraltar. The magazine sits on a plateau with several artillery batteries.

== Description ==
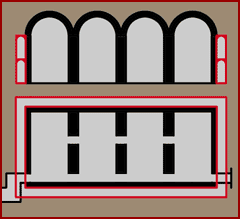
cross section of the magazine

This magazine is said to be the "largest of its type" remaining anywhere in the world. It has been in a derelict state for decades although work has taken place to clear debris. The general layout consisting of four large magazine chambers surrounded by a two level lighting corridor. This would have provided light through windows along the walls while preventing any naked flame from oil lamps from getting near to the magazine's gunpowder.

The magazine sits on Willis's Plateau which is a historic place for the placement of Gibraltar's northern defences. The batteries include Princess Anne's Battery, Princess Amelia's Battery and Princess Royal's Battery and behinds these are the start of the World War II Tunnels of Gibraltar.

The magazine is named for Captain Willis who made such a contribution in the Twelfth Siege of Gibraltar in 1704-5 that this magazine was named for him. He also gave his name to Willis' Road, Willis' Battery (now Princess Royal's Battery), Willis' Cave and Guard.
