= List of museums in Gibraltar =

This is a list of museums in the Gibraltar.

- Gibraltar Museum
- Military Heritage Center
  - Willis' Magazine
  - Lathbury Barracks
- Gibraltar Nature Reserve
  - Moorish Castle
  - Great Siege Tunnels
  - St. Michael's Cave
  - Pillars of Hercules

== See also ==
- Gibraltar Heritage Trust
- History of Gibraltar
- Rock of Gibraltar
