= Charlotte, Princess Royal =

Royal consort of Württemberg from 1797 to 1816

Charlotte
- Princess Royal
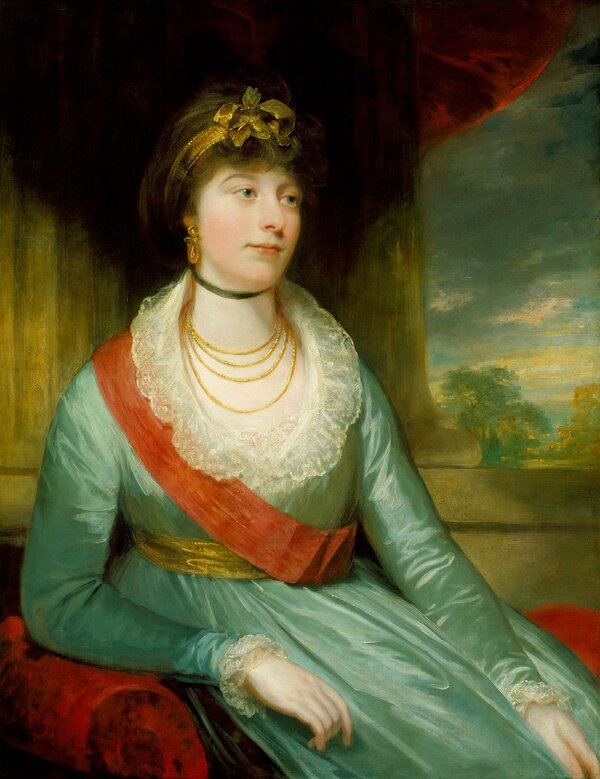
- Portrait by Sir William Beechey

Queen consort of Württemberg
- Tenure: 1 January 1806 – 30 October 1816
- Coronation: 1 January 1806

Electress consort of Württemberg
- Tenure: 25 February 1803 – 6 August 1806

Duchess consort of Württemberg
- Tenure: 23 December 1797 – 30 October 1816
- Born: 29 September 1766; Buckingham House, London, England
- Died: 6 October 1828 (aged 62); Schloss Ludwigsburg, Ludwigsburg, Kingdom of Württemberg
- Burial: 12 October 1828; Schlosskirche, Ludwigsburg, Germany
- Spouse: Frederick I of Württemberg (m. 1797; died 1816)
Names
- Charlotte Augusta Matilda
- House: Hanover (by birth); Württemberg (by marriage)
- Father: George III
- Mother: Charlotte of Mecklenburg-Strelitz

Charlotte, Princess Royal (Charlotte Augusta Matilda; 29 September 1766 – 6 October 1828), was Queen of Württemberg as the wife of King Frederick I. She was the eldest daughter and fourth child of George III of the United Kingdom and his wife, Charlotte of Mecklenburg-Strelitz.

== Early life ==
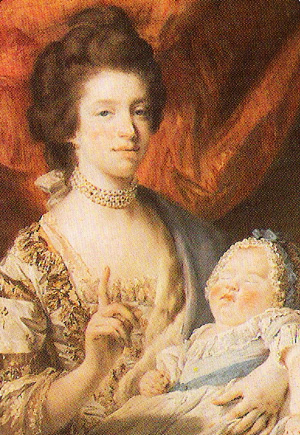
The infant Princess Royal with her mother, Queen Charlotte. Painting by Francis Cotes, 1767.

Charlotte was born on 29 September 1766 at Buckingham House, London, to King George III and Queen Charlotte. She was christened on 27 October 1766 at St James's Palace by the Archbishop of Canterbury, Thomas Secker, and her godparents were her paternal aunt and uncle, Queen Caroline Matilda and King Christian VII of Denmark, and her paternal aunt Louisa. The Duke of Portland, Lord Chamberlain, and the Dowager Countess of Effingham, stood proxy for the King and Queen of Denmark.

Charlotte was officially designated as Princess Royal on 22 June 1789. After the birth of three sons in a row, her parents were delighted to have a daughter in the nursery. Like all of her siblings, Charlotte was inoculated, in her case, in December 1768 along with her brother William. As the eldest daughter of the monarch, Charlotte was assumed to be destined for an important marriage on the continent, and her education was considered to be of the utmost importance, beginning when she was only eighteen months old.

Though she was the eldest daughter, Charlotte was constantly compared to her sister Augusta Sophia, only two years younger than she. When Augusta was a month old, Lady Mary Coke called her "the most beautiful baby I have ever seen" while Charlotte was "very plain". Passing judgement once again three years later, Charlotte was now "the most sensible agreeable child I ever saw, but in my opinion far from pretty" while Augusta was still "rather pretty". Although the Princess Royal was never considered as beautiful as her younger sister, she did not have what was considered her sister's flaw: shyness. Charlotte also had a stammer that her attendant Mary Dacres tried to help her young charge manage.

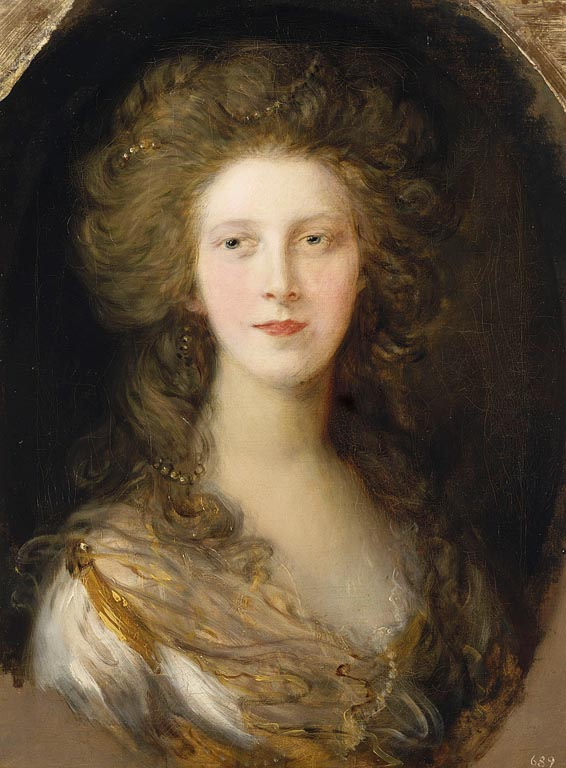
Princess Charlotte, Princess Royal, in 1782, around the age of 16, by Thomas Gainsborough

In 1770, the cluster of the three eldest princesses was completed with the birth of Princess Elizabeth, the seventh child. For the time being, the family remained comparatively small (there were fifteen royal children in all), and Charlotte had parents who preferred spending time with their numerous children to spending all their time at court and took her education seriously. However, given the frequency with which children were being produced and the troubles that plagued George III's reign, Charlotte's childhood was not as utopian as her parents planned it to be.

Like her siblings, the Princess Royal was educated by tutors and spent most of her childhood at Buckingham House, Kew Palace and Windsor Castle, where her wet nurse was Frances, wife of James Muttlebury.

== Marriage ==
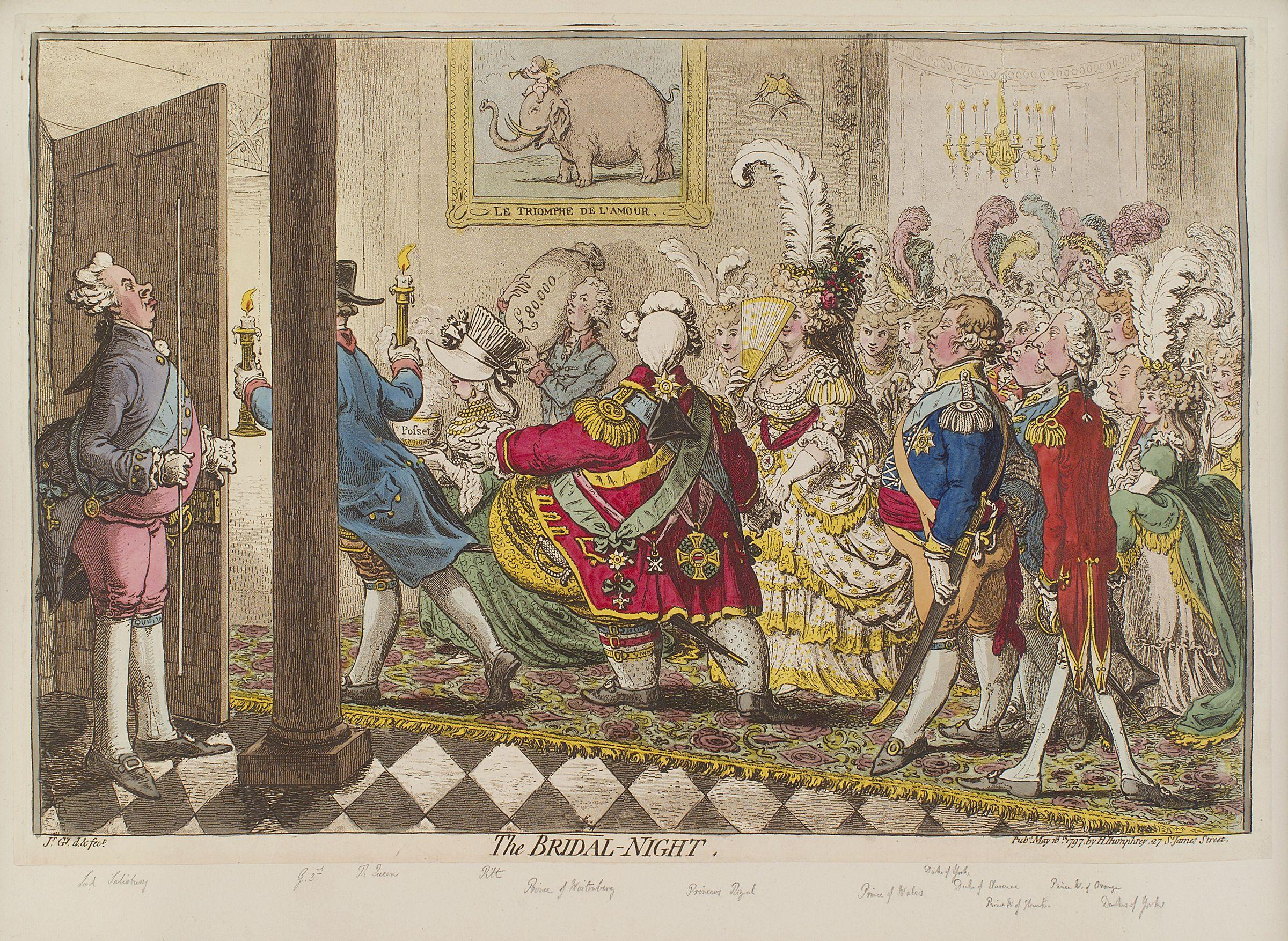
The Bridal Night by James Gilray, satirising Frederick's marriage to Charlotte

On 18 May 1797, the Princess Royal was married at the Chapel Royal, St James's Palace, London, to Frederick, Hereditary Prince of Württemberg, the eldest son and heir apparent of Frederick II Eugene, Duke of Württemberg and his wife, Margravine Sophia Dorothea of Brandenburg-Schwedt.

The younger Frederick succeeded his father as the reigning Duke of Württemberg on 23 December 1797. Duke Frederick III had two sons and two daughters by his first marriage to Augusta of Brunswick-Wolfenbüttel, the daughter of Duke Karl II of Brunswick-Wolfenbüttel and Princess Augusta of Great Britain (the elder sister of George III) and thus Charlotte's first cousin; Augusta of Brunswick was also the sister of Caroline of Brunswick, the estranged wife of the future George IV (then Prince of Wales). The marriage between Duke Frederick and the Princess Royal produced one child: a stillborn daughter on 27 April 1798.

== Württemberg ==
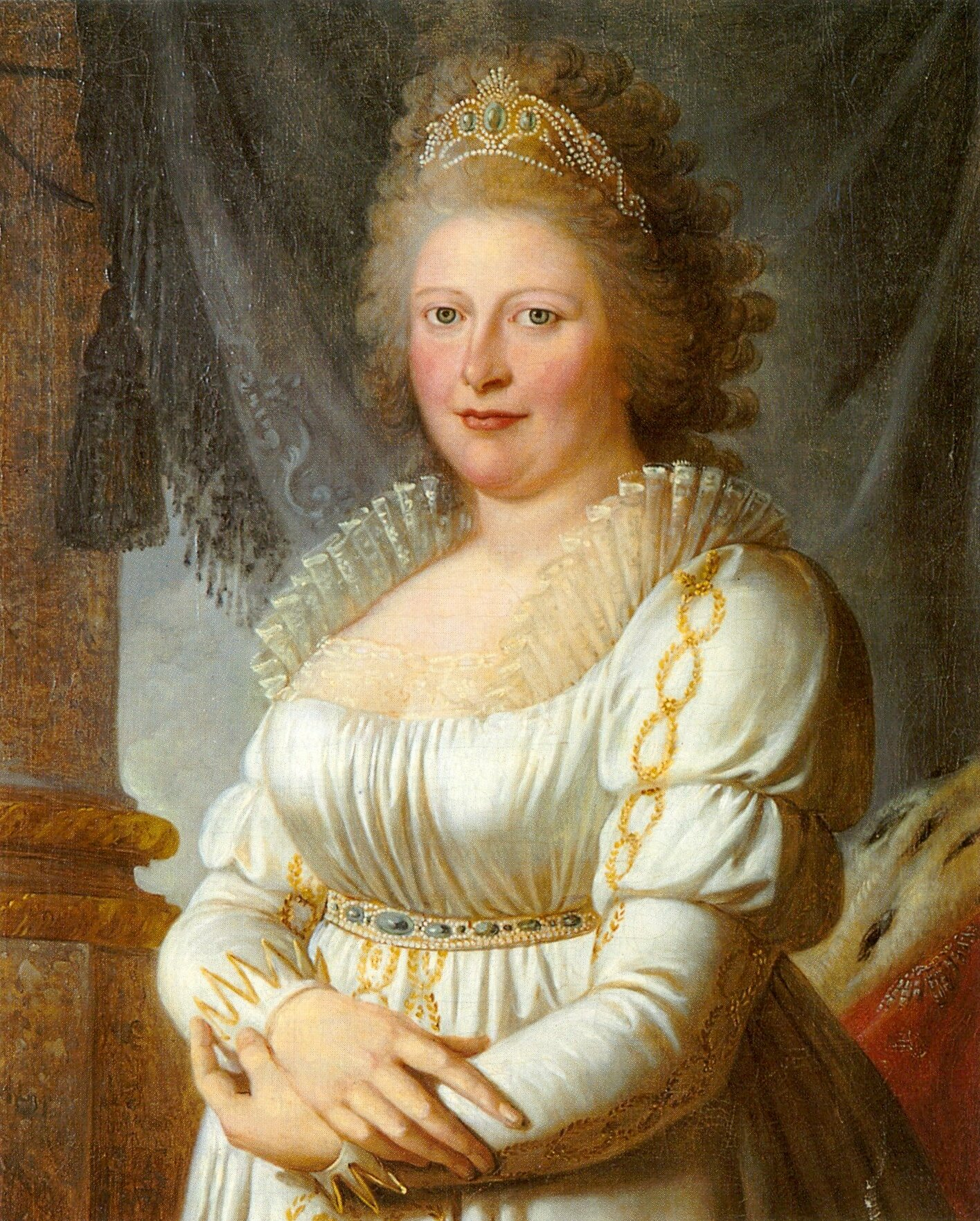
Charlotte as Queen of Württemberg

In 1800, the French army occupied Württemberg, and the Duke and the Duchess fled to Vienna. The following year, Duke Frederick concluded a private treaty that ceded Montbéliard to France and brought him Ellwangen in exchange two years later. He assumed the title Elector of Württemberg on 25 February 1803. In exchange for providing France with a large auxiliary force, Napoleon recognised the Elector as King of Württemberg on 26 December 1805. Electress Charlotte became queen when her husband formally ascended the throne on 1 January 1806 and was crowned as such on the same day at Stuttgart, Germany.

Württemberg seceded from the Holy Roman Empire and joined Napoleon's Confederation of the Rhine. However, the newly elevated king's alliance with France technically made him the enemy of his father-in-law, George III. Incensed by his son-in-law's assumption of the title and his role as one of Napoleon's most devoted vassals, George III accordingly refused to address his daughter as "Queen of Württemberg" in correspondence. In 1813, King Frederick changed sides and went over to the Allies, where his status as the brother-in-law of the Prince Regent (later George IV) helped his standing. After the fall of Napoleon, he attended the Congress of Vienna and was confirmed as king. He died in October 1816.

== Dowager Queen ==
The Dowager Queen of Württemberg continued to live at the Ludwigsburg Palace, near Stuttgart, and received visits from her younger siblings: the Duke of Kent, the Duke of Sussex, the Duke of Cambridge, the Landgravine of Hesse-Homburg and Princess Augusta Sophia. She was a godmother (by proxy) at the christening of her niece, Princess Victoria of Kent (the future Queen Victoria), in 1819.

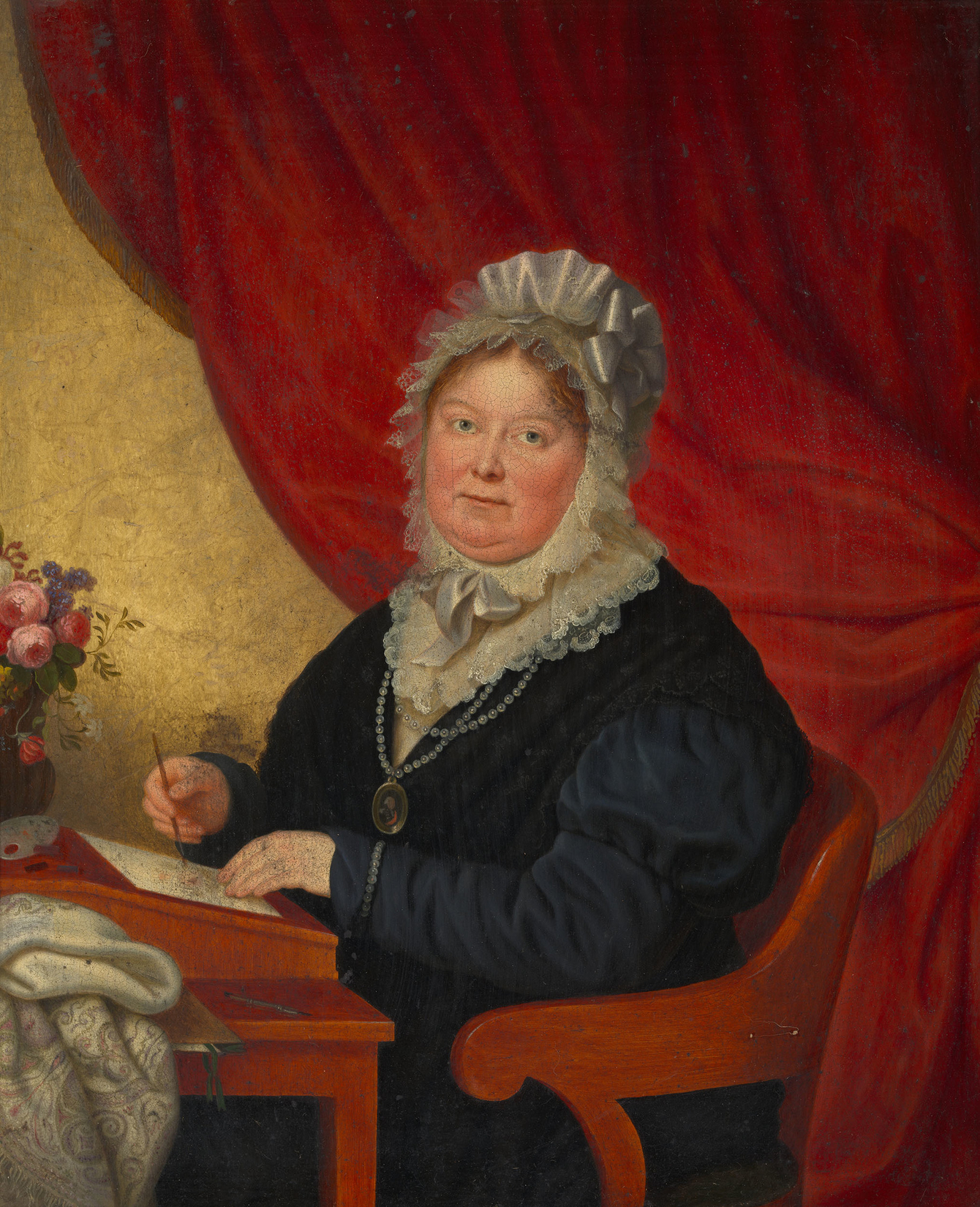
Charlotte as Dowager Queen of Württemberg, by Franz Seraph Stirnbrand, c. 1826

In 1827, Charlotte returned to Britain for the first time since her wedding in 1797. By that time, the 60-year-old princess was very heavy and wanted to have surgery for dropsy in England. Steam propulsion had just been introduced on the Rhine, and ensured that the voyage back home would be convenient. On 31 May, she embarked on the new steamboat Friedrich Wilhelm. After descending the Rhine the steamboat arrived at Bath on the Western Scheldt. Given her weight, Charlotte had to be lifted aboard Royal Sovereign on a chair that was hoisted. Owing to bad weather, Royal Sovereign then had to leave Bath and anchor near Vlissingen. On 5 June Charlotte was in Greenwich.

In London, she resided at St James's Palace, where she received many visits from her family. The king made a final visit from Windsor Castle on 6 October. On Tuesday 9 October Charlotte left England on board Royal Sovereign, but a storm forced her back into Harwich. On the 14th, Royal Sovereign anchored before Klundert on the Hollands Diep. After spending the night on board, Charlotte embarked on the steamboat Stad Nijmegen. On 19 October she arrived in Frankfurt, where she met the king and queen of Württemberg and the Duke of Cambridge. On 24 October she was back at Ludwigsburg Palace.

Charlotte died at Ludwigsburg Palace on 6 October 1828 and is buried in its royal vault.

== Honours and arms ==
Coat of arms of Princess Charlotte

=== Honours ===
- Royal Family Order of King George IV
- Dame Grand Cross of the Order of Saint Catherine, 5 April 1797

=== Arms ===
As a daughter of the sovereign, Charlotte had use of the arms of the kingdom, differenced by a label argent of three points, the centre point bearing a rose gules, the outer points each bearing a cross gules.

== Ancestry ==
Ancestors of Charlotte, Princess Royal

8. George II of Great Britain
4. Frederick, Prince of Wales
9. Princess Caroline of Brandenburg-Ansbach
2. George III of the United Kingdom
10. Frederick II, Duke of Saxe-Gotha-Altenburg
5. Princess Augusta of Saxe-Gotha
11. Princess Magdalena Augusta of Anhalt-Zerbst
1. Charlotte, Princess Royal
12. Adolphus Frederick II, Duke of Mecklenburg-Strelitz
6. Duke Charles Louis Frederick of Mecklenburg-Strelitz
13. Princess Christiane Emilie of Schwarzburg-Sondershausen
3. Princess Charlotte of Mecklenburg-Strelitz
14. Ernest Frederick I, Duke of Saxe-Hildburghausen
7. Princess Elisabeth Albertine of Saxe-Hildburghausen
15. Countess Sophia Albertine of Erbach-Erbach

Charlotte, Princess Royal House of Hanover Cadet branch of the House of Welf Born: 29 September 1766 Died: 6 October 1828
British royalty
Vacant Title last held by Anne, Princess of Orange	Princess Royal; 1766–1828	Vacant Title next held by Victoria, German Empress
German royalty
New title	Queen consort of Württemberg; 1805–1816	Succeeded by Catherine Pavlovna of Russia
