= Willis' Battery =

Artillery battery in Gibraltar

- Part of Fortifications of Gibraltar
- Willis' Plateau in Gibraltar

Site information
- Type: Artillery battery
- Owner: Government of Gibraltar

Willis' Battery is a former artillery battery (now known as Princess Royal's Battery) on the north side of the British Overseas Territory of Gibraltar. It overlooks the isthmus between Spain and Gibraltar.

The battery was originally built during the period of Spanish rule over Gibraltar and was known as Batería de San Joaquín. It was renamed, as was the adjoining plateau, after a British artillery officer called Willis who distinguished himself during the 1704 Capture of Gibraltar. The battery was the first British battery on Willis' Plateau, mounting two guns, and saw active service during the Thirteenth Siege of Gibraltar in 1727. Although it was 440 feet (130 m) above sea level, it proved vulnerable to Spanish bombardment and its guns were dismounted by enemy fire. They were positioned very close to the cliff edge with little protection other than a thin wall to prevent their carriages from rolling over the precipice.

The battery underwent major changes following the siege. Merlons made of casks filled with stones were installed to provide protection from bombardment and the number of cannon was increased to nine. More improvements were made between 1730 and 1745 when two magazines were constructed. During the Anglo-Spanish War of 1762–63 Willis' Battery was equipped with six 8-inch mortars and twenty-two 4.66-inch Coehorn mortars.

Intensive Spanish bombardment during the Great Siege of Gibraltar (1779–83) caused heavy damage to Willis' Battery, which had to be repaired by the summer of 1781. The British defenders constructed caissons – wooden frames filled with rammed clay and topped with pieces of old rope – which were placed on the ramparts of the battery. This proved to be a very effective means of capping the ramparts and improving the guns' protection from enemy fire.

The battery was expanded to mount 34 guns by 1859. In May 1906, a proposal was advanced to mount two 12-pdr. quick-firing guns at Willis' Magazine.
