= James Muttlebury =

Scottish physician (1775–1832)

Dr James Muttlebury FRSE (1775–1832) was a Scottish physician who practised in Jamaica and England. He was a noted amateur botanist.

== Life ==
He was born in 1775, either in Scotland or in Northern Ireland. He studied medicine at St Andrews University.

In 1804 he was working as a military physician in Athlone in Ireland, and was transferred to Marlborough.

In 1814 he was living in Jamaica and practising there.

In 1819 he was elected a Fellow of the Royal Society of Edinburgh. His proposers were fellow-botanists Robert Jameson, William Wright, and Hugh Murray.

In 1822 he moved to Bath as a GP. In 1826 he became a Physician at the United Hospital in Bath. In 1824 he was living at the Edgar Buildings in Bath.

== Family ==
He married Elizabeth Margaret Rutherford of Kingston, Jamaica (1788–1869). She died in Canada.

They had eleven children including Captain James William Muttlebury of Bath who was father to Stanley Muttlebury.
