= Princess Caroline of Great Britain =

British princess (1713–1757)

Princess Caroline
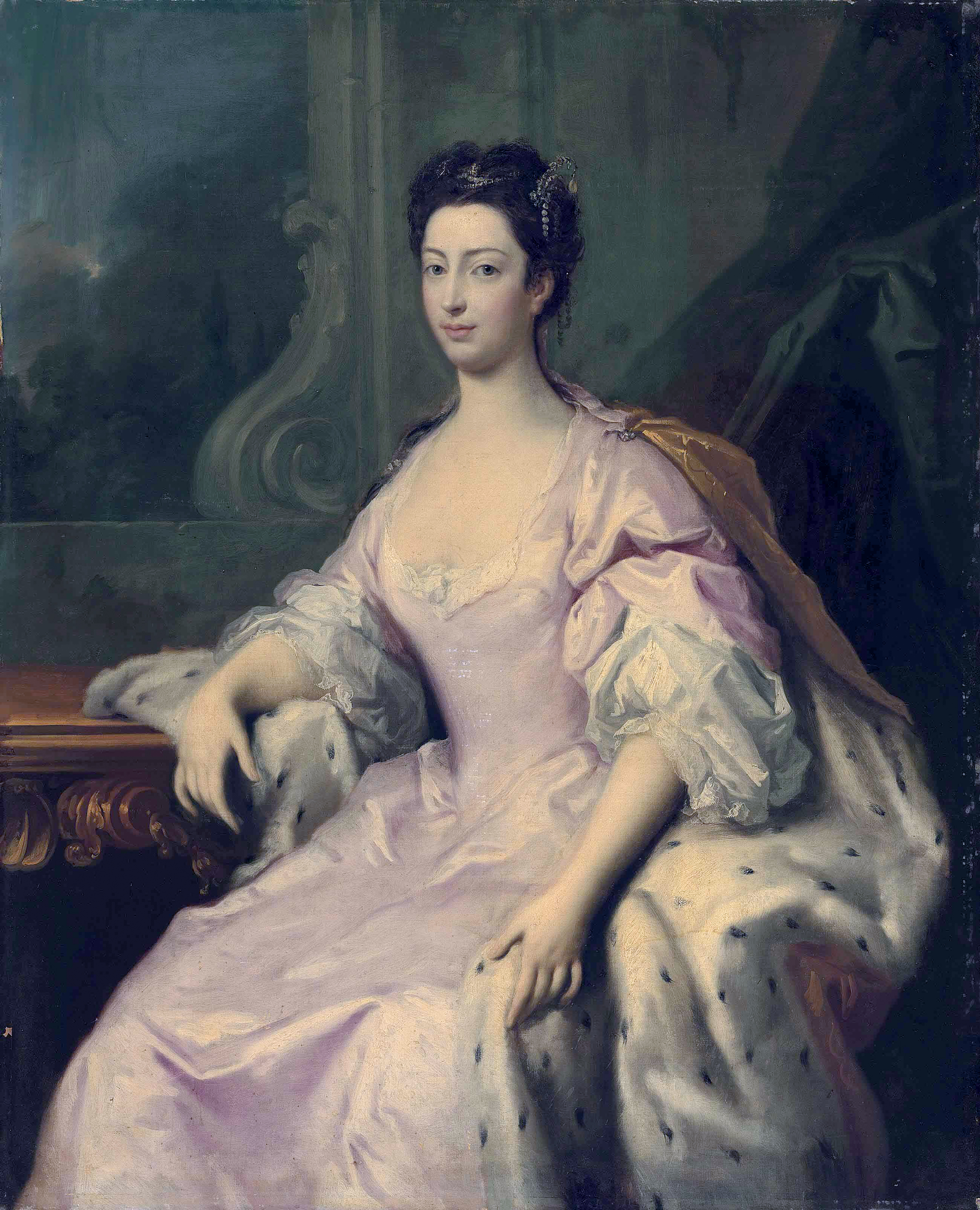
- Portrait by Jacopo Amigoni, c. 1730s
- Born: 10 June 1713 (New Style); Herrenhausen Palace, Hanover, Holy Roman Empire
- Died: 28 December 1757 (aged 44); St James's Palace, London, England
- Burial: 5 January 1758; Westminster Abbey, London
- House: Hanover
- Father: George II of Great Britain
- Mother: Caroline of Ansbach

Princess Caroline of Great Britain (Caroline Elizabeth; 10 June 1713 – 28 December 1757) was the fourth child and third daughter of King George II of Great Britain and his wife Caroline of Ansbach.

== Early life ==
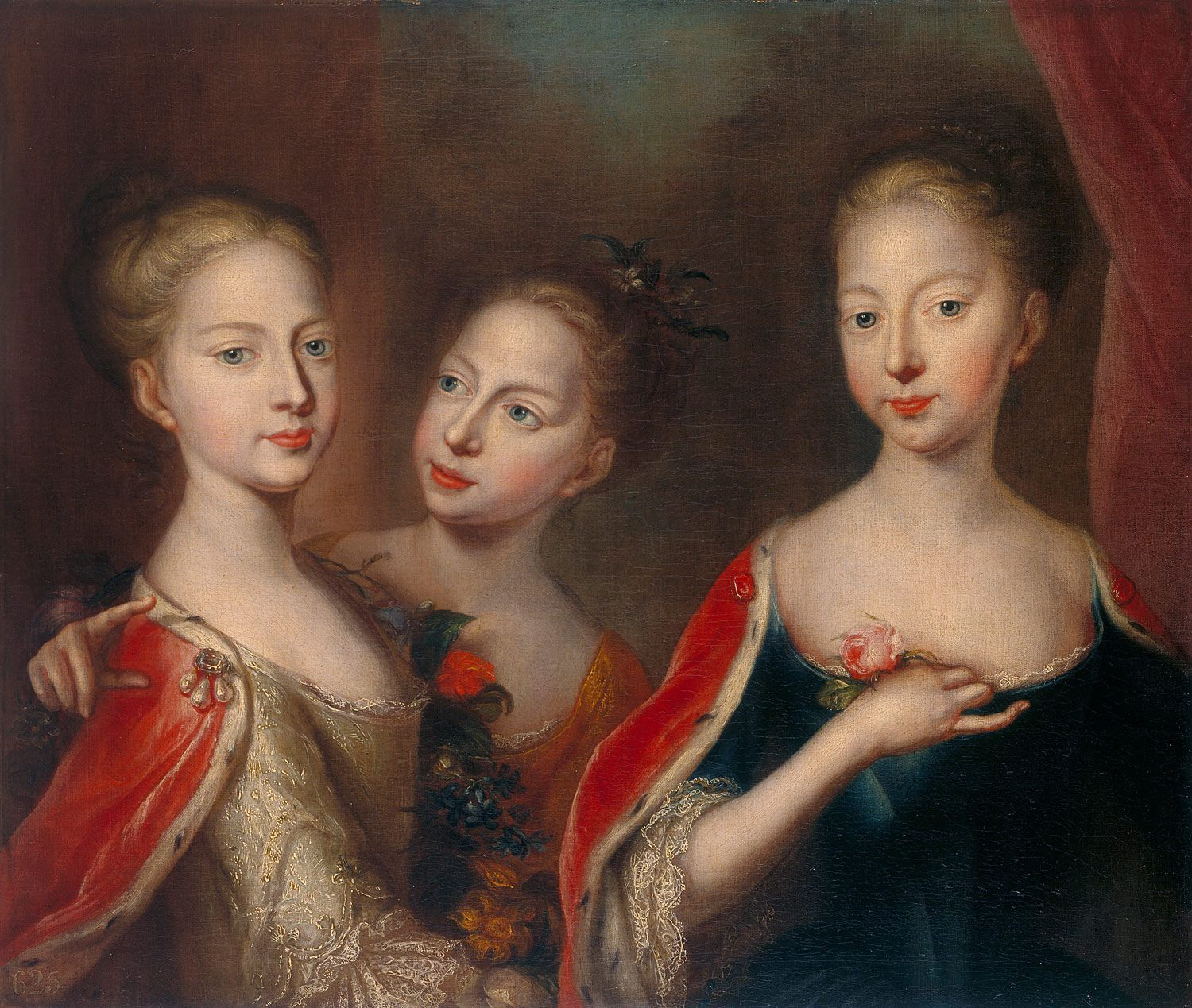
Sisters Anne, Amelia and Caroline, by Martin Maingaud, 1721

Princess Caroline (Note: The London Gazette (i.e. those on and after her death) refers to her as only Princess Caroline) was born at Herrenhausen Palace in Hanover, Germany, on 10 June 1713 (New Style Gregorian calendar). Her father was George Augustus, Hereditary Prince of Hanover, the eldest son of George Louis, Elector of Hanover. Her mother was Caroline of Ansbach, daughter of Johann Friedrich, Margrave of Brandenburg-Ansbach. As a granddaughter of the Elector of Hanover, she was styled Princess Caroline of Hanover at birth. Under the Act of Settlement 1701, she was seventh in the line of succession to the British throne. She was baptised the day after her birth at Herrenhausen Palace.

== Great Britain ==
In 1714, Queen Anne died and Caroline's grandfather became George I and her father Prince of Wales. At the age of one year, Caroline accompanied her mother and elder sisters, the Princesses Anne and Amelia, to Great Britain, and the family resided at St James's Palace, London. She was then styled as a Princess of Great Britain.

In 1722, at the direction of her mother, she was inoculated against smallpox by variolation, an early type of immunisation popularised by Lady Mary Wortley Montagu and Charles Maitland.

A newly attributed list from January–February 1728 documents her personal expenses, including charitable contributions to several Protestant groups in London.

Princess Caroline was her mother's favourite, and became known as "the truth-telling Caroline Elizabeth" (or "the truth-loving"). When any disagreement took place among the royal children, her parents would say, "Send for Caroline, and then we shall know the truth!"

== Later life ==
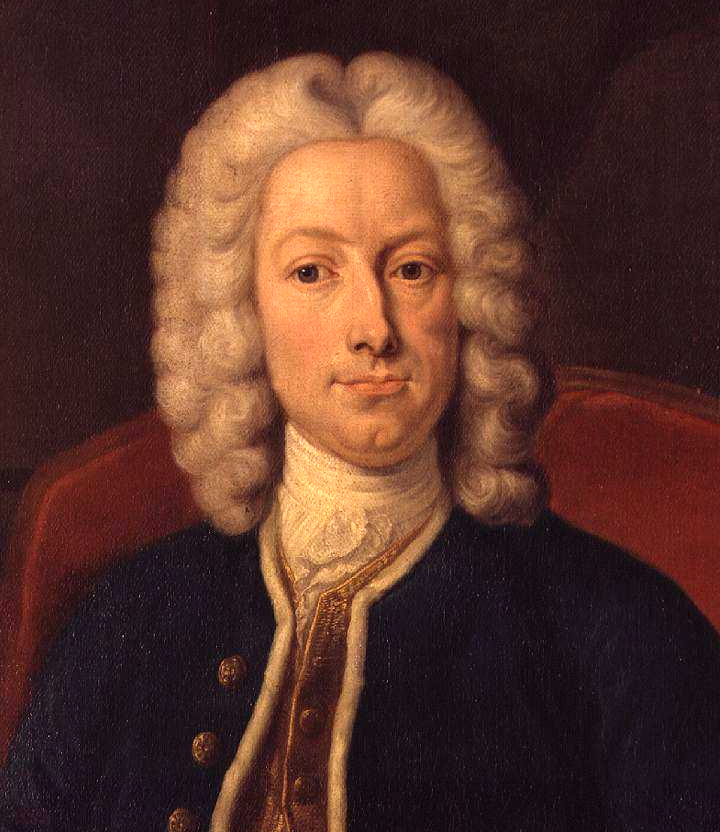
Lord Hervey

According to popular belief, Caroline's unhappiness was due to her love for the married courtier Lord Hervey. Hervey, who was bisexual, may have had an affair with Caroline's elder brother, Prince Frederick, and was romantically linked with several ladies of the court, including Frederick's then mistress Anne Vane, as well. When Hervey died in 1743, Caroline retired to St. James's Palace for many years prior to her own death, accessible to only her family and closest friends. She gave generously to charity.

Princess Caroline died, unmarried and childless, on 28 December 1757, aged 44, at St James's Palace. She was buried at Westminster Abbey.

Horace Walpole, of the death of Princess Caroline, wrote: "Though her state of health had been so dangerous for years, and her absolute confinement for many of them, her disorder was, in a manner, new and sudden, and her death unexpected by herself, though earnestly her wish. Her goodness was constant and uniform, her generosity immense, her charities most extensive; in short, I, no royalist, could be lavish in her praise."

== Arms ==
On 31 January 1719, as a grandchild of the sovereign, Caroline was granted use of the arms of the realm, differenced by a label argent of five points, each bearing three roses gules. On 30 August 1727, as a child of the sovereign, Caroline's difference changed to a label argent of three points, each bearing three roses gules.

Coat of Arms from 30 August 1727

== Ancestors ==
Ancestors of Princess Caroline of Great Britain

8. Ernest Augustus, Elector of Hanover
4. George I of Great Britain
9. Princess Sophia of the Palatinate
2. George II of Great Britain
10. George William, Duke of Brunswick-Lüneburg
5. Duchess Sophia Dorothea of Brunswick-Celle
11. Eleonore d'Esmier d'Olbreuse
1. Princess Caroline of Great Britain
12. Albert II, Margrave of Brandenburg-Ansbach
6. John Frederick, Margrave of Brandenburg-Ansbach
13. Countess Sophie Margarete of Oettingen-Oettingen
3. Princess Caroline of Brandenburg-Ansbach
14. John George I, Duke of Saxe-Eisenach
7. Princess Eleonore Erdmuthe of Saxe-Eisenach
15. Johannetta, Countess of Sayn-Altenkirchen

== See also ==
- List of British princesses
- House of Hanover
