= Anne, Princess Royal and Princess of Orange =

Princess of Orange from 1734 to 1751

Anne
- Princess Royal
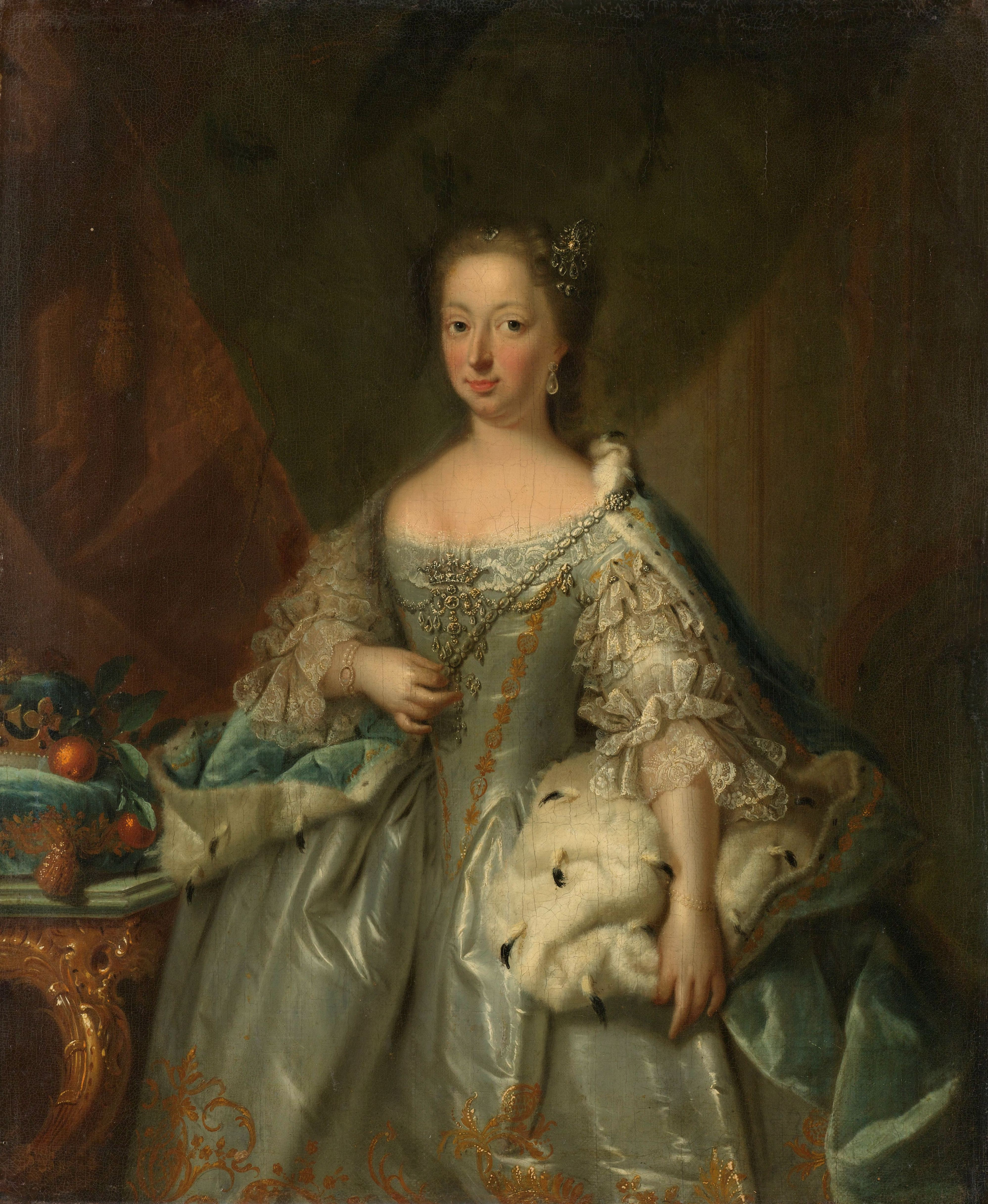
- Portrait by Johann Valentin Tischbein, c. 1753

Princess consort of Orange
- Tenure: 25 March 1734 – 22 October 1751
- Born: 2 November 1709 (O.S.: 22 October 1709); Herrenhausen Palace, Hanover, Electorate of Hanover, Holy Roman Empire
- Died: 12 January 1759 (aged 49); The Hague, Dutch Republic
- Burial: 23 February 1759; Nieuwe Kerk, Delft
- Spouse: William IV, Prince of Orange (m. 1734; died 1751)
- Issue: Carolina, Princess of Nassau-Weilburg; Princess Anna; William V, Prince of Orange
- House: Hanover
- Father: George II of Great Britain
- Mother: Caroline of Ansbach

Anne, Princess Royal (2 November [O.S. 22 October] 1709 – 12 January 1759) was the second child and eldest daughter of King George II of Great Britain and his consort Caroline of Ansbach. She was the wife of William IV, Prince of Orange, the first hereditary stadtholder of all seven provinces of the Dutch Republic. She was Regent of the Netherlands from 1751 until her death in 1759, exercising extensive powers on behalf of her son William V. She was known as an Anglophile, due to her English upbringing and family connections, but was unable to convince the Dutch Republic to enter the Seven Years' War on the side of the British. Princess Anne was the second daughter of a British sovereign to hold the title Princess Royal. (Note: Princess Mary (born 1631), the daughter of Henrietta Maria and Charles, became the first Princess Royal in 1642.) In the Netherlands she was styled Anna van Hannover.

== Early life ==
Anne was born at Herrenhausen Palace, Hanover, five years before her paternal grandfather, Elector George Louis, succeeded to the thrones of Great Britain and Ireland as George I. She was named after her paternal grandfather's second cousin Anne, Queen of Great Britain.

She learned German, French and English, and was taught music (including singing, harpsichord, and composition) by Georg Friedrich Händel. Händel did not like teaching, but said he would "make the only exception for Anne, flower of princesses". She remained a lifelong supporter, attending his operas and subscribing to his music. She also studied dance with Anthony L'Abbé who choreographed the dance The Princess Royal (1715) in her honour.

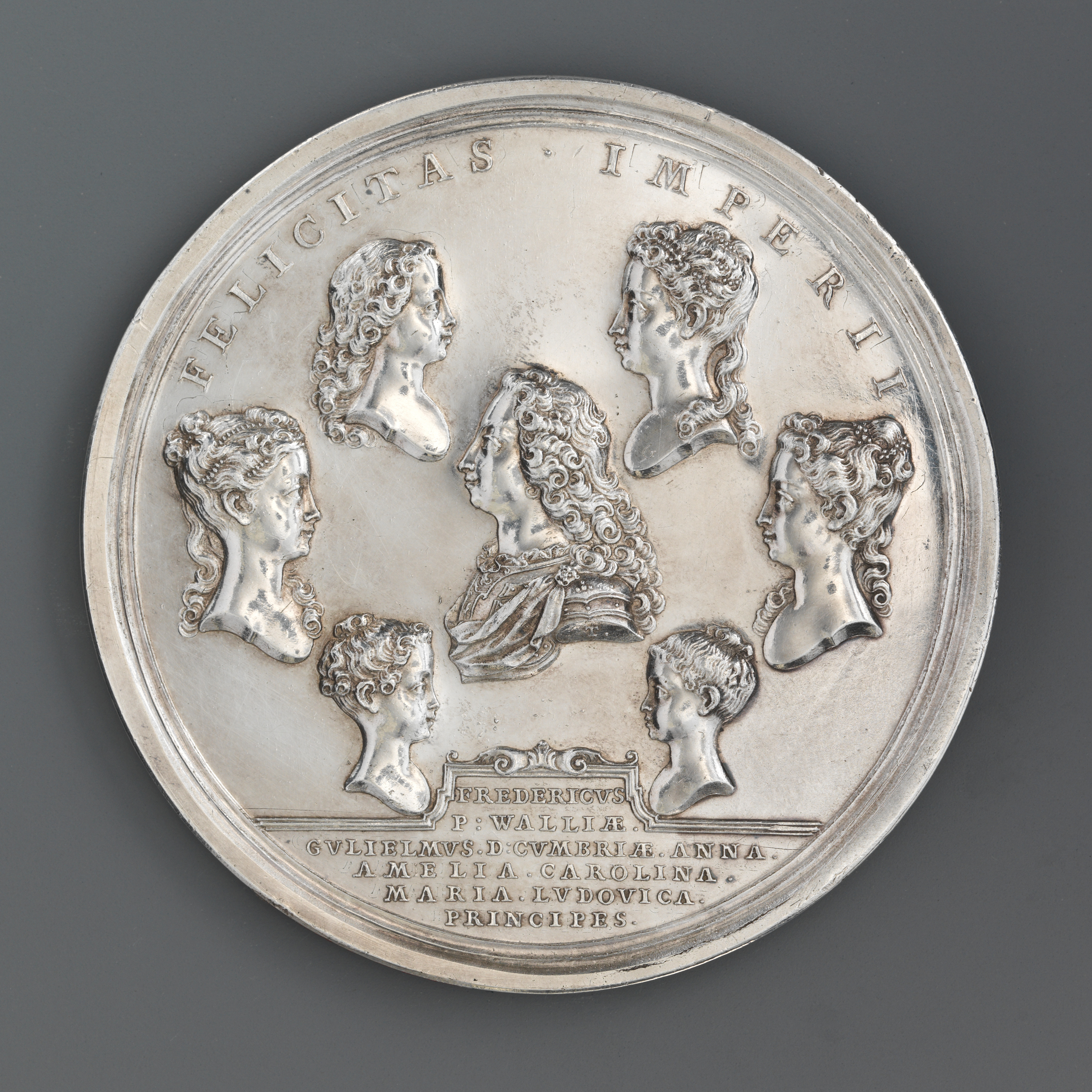
John Croker's medal of 1732 showing the surviving children of King George II, Frederick, William, Anne, Amelia, Caroline, Mary, and Louisa

Anne contracted and survived smallpox in 1720, and two years later her mother helped to popularise the practice of variolation (an early type of immunisation against smallpox), which had been witnessed by Lady Mary Wortley Montagu and Charles Maitland in Constantinople. At the direction of Caroline, six prisoners condemned to death were offered the chance to undergo variolation instead of execution: they all survived, as did six orphan children given the same treatment as a further test. Convinced of its medical value, the Queen had her two younger daughters, Amelia and Caroline, inoculated successfully. Anne's face was scarred by the disease, and she was not considered as pretty as her two younger sisters.

== Marriage ==
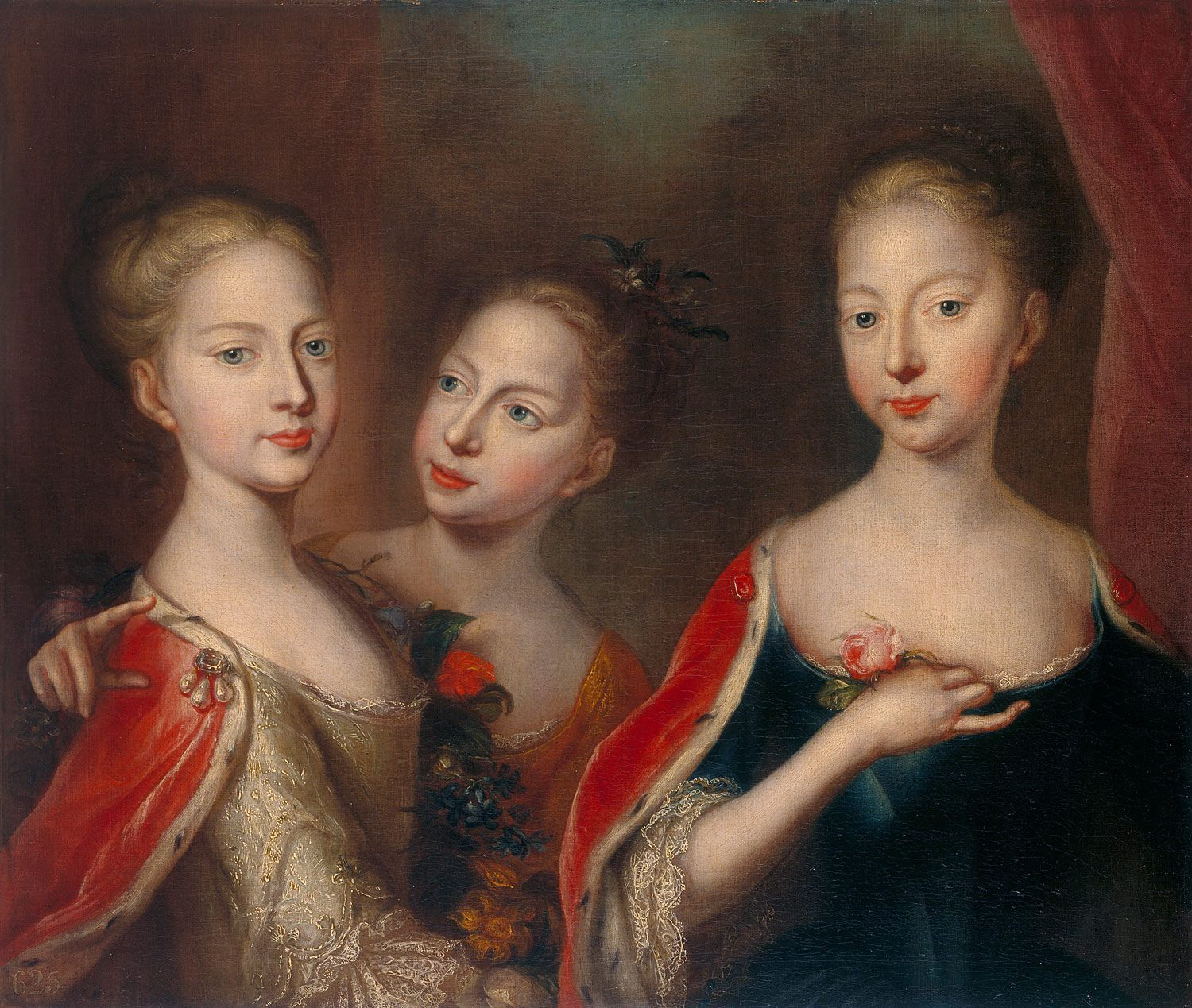
Sisters Anne, Amelia and Caroline, by Martin Maingaud, c. 1721

In 1725, a marriage between Anne and King Louis XV of France was considered. From a French viewpoint, such a marriage could give France valuable neutrality from The Netherlands and Prussia, as well as protection against Spain. However, the religious issues caused problems. While it was taken for granted that Anne would have to convert to Catholicism, there were concerns that this would still not be enough for the Pope, whose support was needed, particularly regarding the broken betrothal between Louis XV and a Spanish princess, and the prospect of Anne becoming Regent of France in case of a minor regency was feared because of her presumed religious inclinations toward the Huguenots in France. The plans was eventually discarded when the French insisted that Anne must convert to Roman Catholicism.

On 25 March 1734 [O.S. 14 March 1733] in the Chapel Royal at St. James's Palace, she married Prince William IV of Orange. She then ceased to use her British title in favour of the new one she gained by marriage. The music played at her wedding, This is the day was set by Handel to the princess's own words based on Psalms 45 and 118. Handel also composed an operatic entertainment, Parnasso in Festa, in honour of her wedding which was performed for the first time at the King's Theatre, London, on 13 March 1734, with great success. Nassau Street, Soho, London (renamed Gerrard Place in 1910) was named in honour of the marriage.

William suffered from a spinal deformity, which affected his appearance, but Anne said she would marry him even "if he were a baboon". Her reason for being so insistent upon this marriage was reported to be simply that she wished to be married, to avoid a life as a spinster at the court of her father and her brother, with whom she did not get along; and as the only match considered suitable for her was with a monarch or heir to a throne, William was essentially her only remaining Protestant choice, and when questioned by her father, she stated that it was not a matter of whether she should marry William, the question was rather whether she should marry at all.

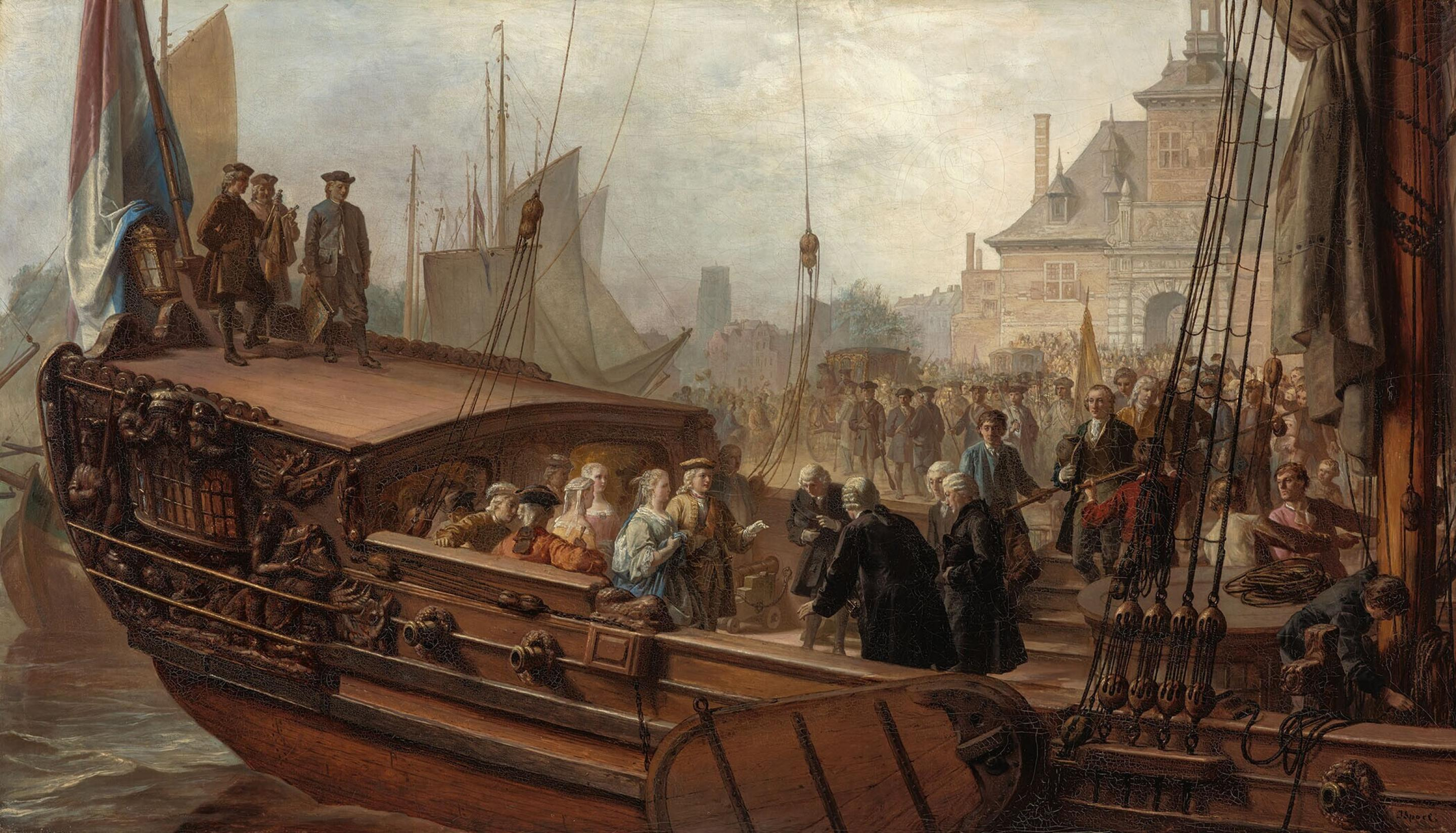
The Welcome by the Mayor of Rotterdam of William IV, Prince of Orange and his Consort Anna of Great Britain, 1734. By Jacob Spoel

William and Anne sailed to Holland after a honeymoon at Kew. In the Netherlands, they resided at Leeuwarden. Anne soon felt homesick when William went on campaign in the Rhineland, and she travelled back to England, believing herself to be pregnant, Anne thought she should give birth to the child in her homeland as the child would be in the line of succession to the British throne. However, this decision was not well received with her husband and her father, who both commanded her to return to Holland after a brief stay. By April 1735, it was clear that Anne was not with child after all. In 1736, she did become pregnant, but the child (a daughter) was stillborn.

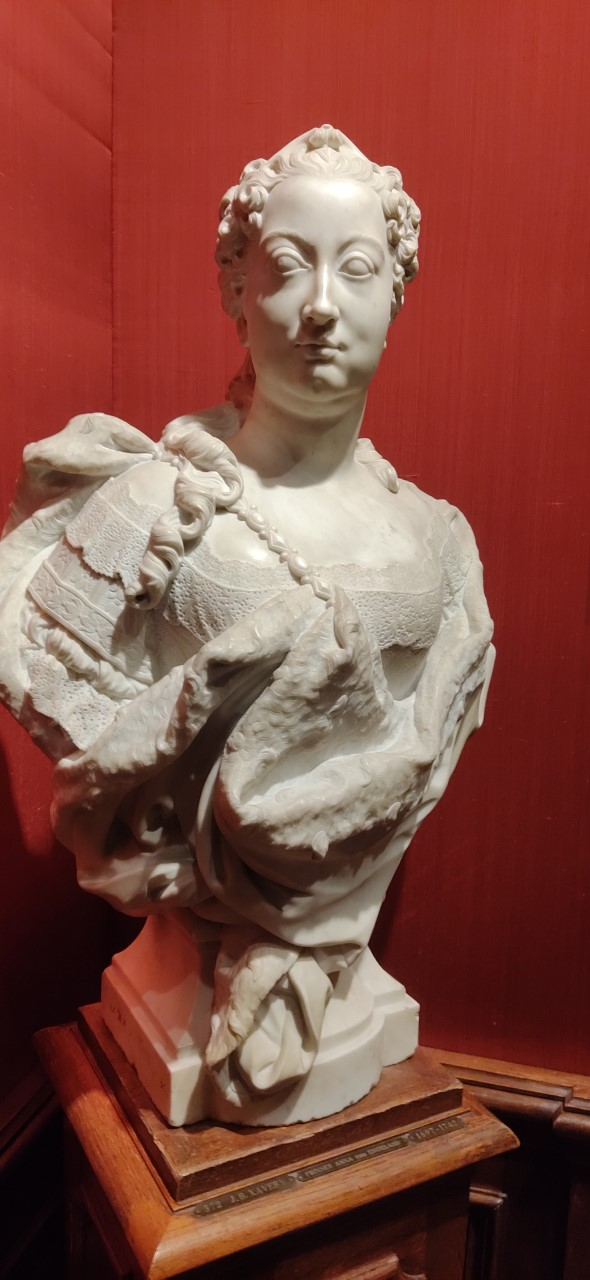
Portrait of Princess Anne by Jan Baptist Xavery, 1736

Anne was not well liked by the Dutch people and did not get on well with her mother-in-law Marie Louise of Hesse-Kassel. However, Anne was considered to have a regal essence but seemed to have a belief in British superiority over the Dutch; she was also thought to be neglectful of her duties and seemed to isolate herself in her interests in music and literature; and she was accused of displaying little consideration for her courtiers, for example by forcing her ladies-in-waiting to read for her for hours, ignoring their fatigue. Her relationship with William, however, which was at first distant, eventually developed into harmony and intimacy, which is displayed in their correspondence. In 1747, William became stadtholder of all the Seven United Provinces, and this was followed by a constitutional reform which made his new wider authority hereditary. William and Anne moved to the Hague, where Anne introduced Händel to the Netherlands: he accepted her invitation to her music life at the Hague in 1750.

== Regency ==
William IV died on 22 October 1751, and Anne was appointed as regent for her three-year-old son, William V. She gained all the prerogatives normally held by a hereditary stadtholder of the Netherlands, with the exception of the military duties of the office, which were entrusted to Duke Louis Ernest of Brunswick-Lüneburg. She was hard-working, but arrogant and imperious, which made her unpopular. The 1750s were years of increasing tension and commercial rivalry between Holland and Great Britain, which placed her in a difficult position.

Anne's interior policy focused on defending the authority of the central hereditary stadtholder government over the traditional rights of the Dutch states. The reform of the hereditary post of stadtholder had been introduced during the reign of her late husband; it was new and controversial and was questioned after his death, but Anne effectively defended the centralized government. In the conflict with the city of Haarlem, for example, she prevented the city from holding its election by refusing the release of its list of candidates. Her harsh rule was resented, but her consolidation policy effectively secured the new hereditary Stadtholder rule in the Netherlands.

In her foreign policy, Anne favoured the British alliance with the Emperor before the French, a policy which was not popular in the Netherlands, and her fortification of the southern provinces against the French Netherlands was met with great opposition.

Anne continued to act as regent until her death from dropsy in 1759, at The Hague, when she was replaced by her mother-in-law, Marie Louise of Hesse-Kassel, who was assisted by Duke Louis Ernest of Brunswick-Lüneburg. When she too died in 1765, Anne's daughter, Carolina, was made regent until William V reached the age of eighteen in 1766.

== Works ==
The princess took drawing and painting lessons from Herman van der Mijn and made a self-portrait in 1740 that is in the collection of the House of Orange-Nassau Historic Collections Trust. She also made a portrait of van der Mijn himself while he was at work making portraits of other family members.

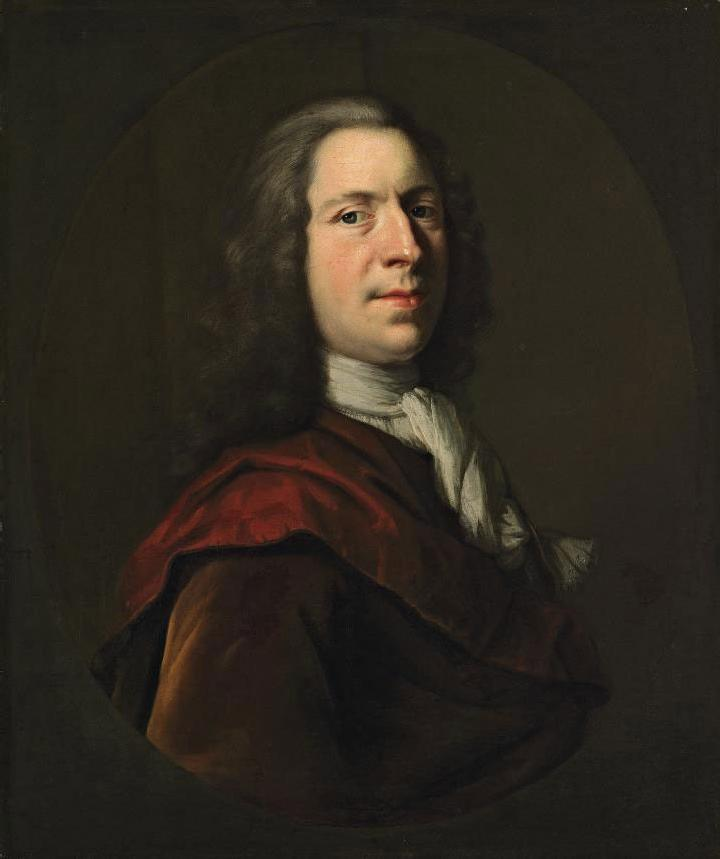
Portrait of Herman van der Mijn by Anna van Hannover

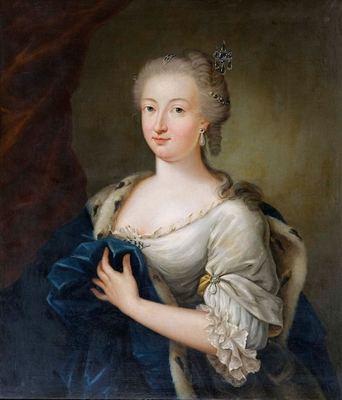
Self-portrait, c. 1740

== Legacy ==
Princess Anne, Maryland, is named after her.

== Arms ==
On 31 January 1719, as a grandchild of the sovereign, Anne was granted use of the arms of the realm, differenced by a label argent of five points, each bearing a cross gules. On 30 August 1727, as a child of the sovereign, Anne's difference changed to a label argent of three points, each bearing a cross gules.

Coat of arms from 30 August 1727

== Issue ==
Name	Birth	Death	Notes
Princess Carolina	28 February 1743	6 May 1787	married 5 March 1760, Charles Christian, Prince of Nassau-Weilburg; had issue
Princess Anna	15 November 1746	29 December 1746	
William V, Prince of Orange	8 March 1748	9 April 1806	married 4 October 1767, Princess Wilhelmina of Prussia; had issue

== Ancestors ==
Ancestors of Anne, Princess Royal and Princess of Orange

8. Ernest Augustus, Elector of Hanover
4. George I of Great Britain
9. Princess Sophia of the Palatinate
2. George II of Great Britain
10. George William, Duke of Brunswick-Lüneburg
5. Duchess Sophia Dorothea of Brunswick-Celle
11. Éléonore Desmier d'Olbreuse
1. Anne, Princess Royal
12. Albert II, Margrave of Brandenburg-Ansbach
6. John Frederick, Margrave of Brandenburg-Ansbach
13. Countess Sophie Margarete of Oettingen-Oettingen
3. Princess Caroline of Brandenburg-Ansbach
14. John George I, Duke of Saxe-Eisenach
7. Princess Eleonore Erdmuthe of Saxe-Eisenach
15. Johannetta, Countess of Sayn-Altenkirchen

== Notes ==
Anne, Princess Royal and Princess of Orange House of Hanover Cadet branch of the House of Welf Born: 2 November 1709 Died: 12 January 1759
Dutch royalty
Vacant Title last held by Marie Louise of Hesse-Kassel	Princess consort of Orange; 1734–1751	Vacant Title next held by Wilhelmina of Prussia
British royalty
Vacant Title last held by Mary, Princess of Orange	Princess Royal; 1727–1759	Vacant Title next held by Charlotte, Queen of Württemberg
