= Martin Maingaud =

French painter

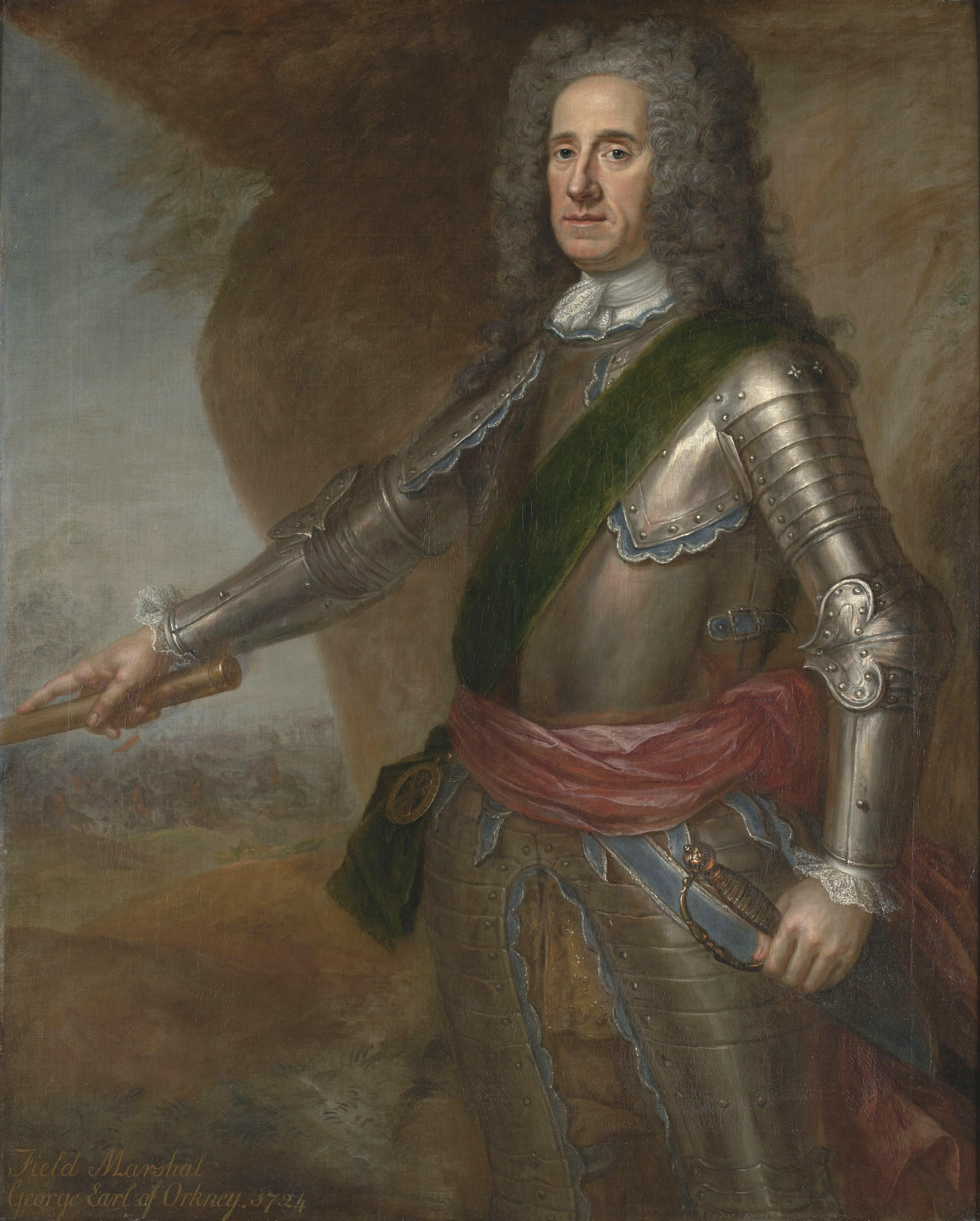
1724 portrait of George Hamilton, 1st Earl of Orkney by Maingaud

Martin Maingaud (died 1725; fl.1692-c.1725) was a French portraitist.
