= Princess Amelia of Great Britain =

British princess (1711–1786)

Princess Amelia
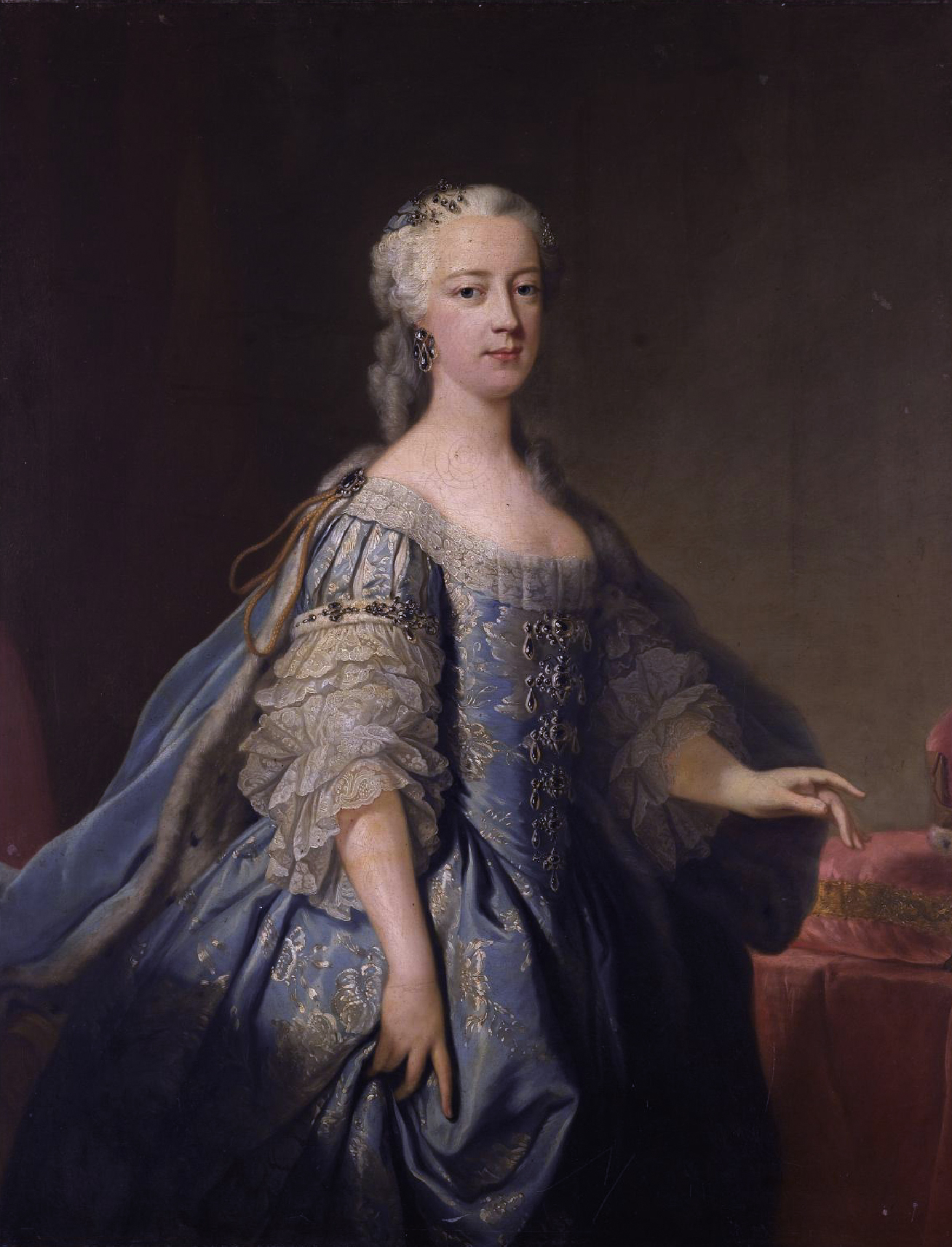
- Portrait by Jean-Baptiste van Loo, c. 1738
- Born: 10 June 1711 (New Style); Herrenhausen Palace, Hanover, Electorate of Hanover, Holy Roman Empire
- Died: 31 October 1786 (aged 75); Cavendish Square, London, England
- Burial: 11 November 1786; Westminster Abbey, London
Names
- Amelia Sophia Eleonore
- House: Hanover
- Father: George II of Great Britain
- Mother: Caroline of Ansbach

Princess Amelia of Great Britain (Amelia Sophia Eleonore; 10 June 1711 (New Style) – 31 October 1786) was the second daughter of King George II of Great Britain and Queen Caroline. Born in Hanover, she moved to England when her grandfather George I became king. Amelia lived a solitary existence and died in 1786, the last surviving child of her parents.

== Early life ==
Princess Amelia was born at Herrenhausen Palace, Hanover, Germany, on 30 May 1711 (Old Style). At the time of her birth, her father was Hereditary Prince of Brunswick-Lüneburg, son and heir of the Elector of Hanover. Her mother was Caroline of Ansbach, daughter of Johann Friedrich, Margrave of Brandenburg-Ansbach. She was known to her family as Emily.

== Great Britain ==
On 1 August 1714, Queen Anne of Great Britain and Ireland died. Princess Amelia's grandfather succeeded her to become George I of Great Britain, in accordance with the provisions of the Act of Settlement 1701. Amelia's father, now heir apparent to the throne of Great Britain, was made Duke of Cornwall and created Prince of Wales on 27 September 1714. She moved to Great Britain with her family and they took up residence at St James's Palace in London.

Though comparatively healthy as an adult, Amelia was a sickly child and her mother employed Johann Georg Steigerthal and Hans Sloane to treat her, as well as secretly asking the physician John Freind for advice. In 1722 her mother, who had progressive ideas, had Amelia and her sister Caroline inoculated against smallpox by an early type of immunisation known as variolation, which had been brought to England from Constantinople by Lady Mary Wortley Montagu and Charles Maitland. On 11 June 1727, George I died and her father succeeded him as George II. She lived with her father until his death in 1760.

Amelia's aunt Sophia Dorothea, Queen of Prussia, suggested Amelia as a suitable wife for her son Frederick (later known as Frederick the Great). Correspondence, planning and negotiations dragged on for years from 1723, accompanied by numerous intrigues and diplomatic interventions by Austria, but his father Frederick William I of Prussia finally backed away from the plan in 1732 and forced his son to marry Elisabeth Christine of Brunswick-Bevern instead. In 1724 Amelia and her sister the Princess Royal were among the final four candidates for marriage to Louis XV of France. However, as this required her to convert to Catholicism, her father prevented the match.

Amelia greatly enjoyed riding and hunting. She was disliked by artistic fops such as Lord Hervey, and Lady Pomfret considered her "one of the oddest princesses that ever was known; she has ears shut to flattery and her heart open to honesty."

Lady Isabella Finch became her Lady of the Bedchamber in 1738 or thereabouts.

Amelia may have been the mother of the composer Samuel Arnold (1740–1802) through an affair with a commoner of the name Thomas Arnold.

== Later life ==
In 1751, Princess Amelia became ranger of Richmond Park after the death of Robert Walpole, 2nd Earl of Orford. Immediately afterwards, the Princess caused major public uproar by closing the park to the public, only allowing few close friends and those with special permits to enter.

This continued until 1758, when a local brewer, John Lewis, took the gatekeeper, who stopped him from entering the park, to court. The court ruled in favour of Lewis, citing the fact that, when Charles I enclosed the park in the 17th century, he allowed the public right of way in the park. Princess Amelia was forced to lift the restrictions.

The Princess was generous in her gifts to charitable organisations. In 1760 she donated £100 to the society for educating poor orphans of clergymen (later the Clergy Orphan Corporation) to help pay for a school for 21 orphan daughters of clergymen of the Church of England. In 1783 she agreed to become an annual subscriber of £25 to the new County Infirmary in Northampton.

In 1761, Princess Amelia became the owner of Gunnersbury Estate, Middlesex, purchased from the estate of Henry Furnese. Princess Amelia used Gunnersbury as her summer residence. She added a chapel and at some time between 1777 and 1784 she commissioned a bath house, extended as a folly by a subsequent owner of the land in the 19th century, which still stands today with a Grade II English Heritage listing and is known as Princess Amelia's Bathhouse.

She also owned a property in Cavendish Square, Soho, London, where she died unmarried on 31 October 1786, at which time she was the last surviving child of King George II and Queen Caroline. A miniature of her first cousin, Frederick the Great, was found on her body. The great king originally intended for her had died two months earlier. She was buried in the Henry VII Lady Chapel in Westminster Abbey.

== Legacy ==
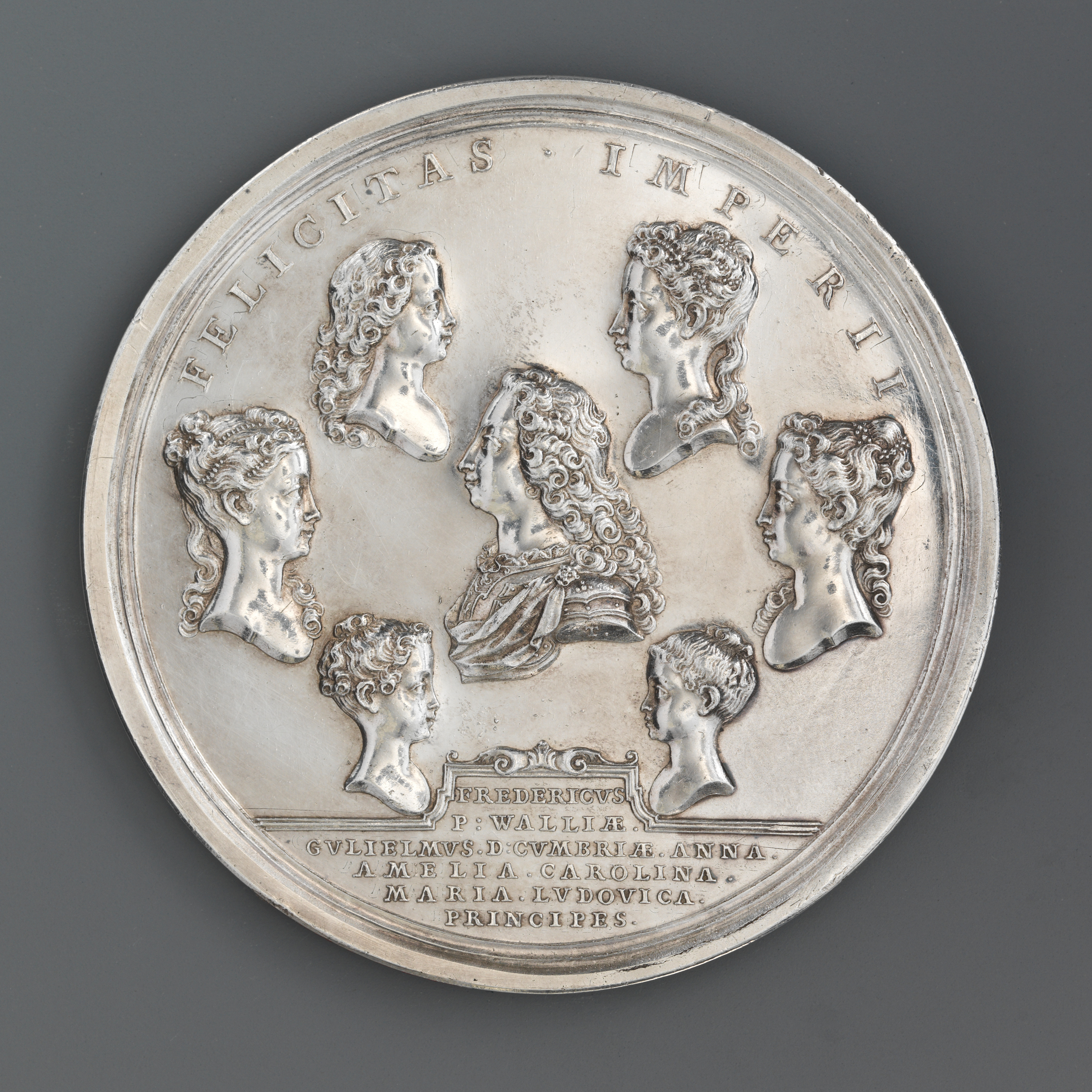
John Croker's medal of 1732 showing the surviving children of King George II: Frederick, William, Anne, Amelia, Caroline, Mary, and Louisa

Amelia Island in Florida, in the United States, is named for her, as is Amelia County in Virginia.

== Arms ==
On 31 January 1719, as a grandchild of the sovereign, Amelia was granted use of the arms of the realm, differenced by a label argent of five points ermine. On 30 August 1727, as a child of the sovereign, Amelia's difference changed to a label argent of three points ermine.

Coat of arms from 30 August 1727

== Ancestors ==
Ancestors of Princess Amelia of Great Britain

8. Ernest Augustus, Elector of Hanover
4. George I of Great Britain
9. Princess Sophia of the Palatinate
2. George II of Great Britain
10. George William, Duke of Brunswick-Lüneburg
5. Duchess Sophia Dorothea of Brunswick-Celle
11. Éléonore Desmier d'Olbreuse
1. Princess Amelia of Great Britain
12. Albert II, Margrave of Brandenburg-Ansbach
6. John Frederick, Margrave of Brandenburg-Ansbach
13. Countess Sophie Margarete of Oettingen-Oettingen
3. Princess Caroline of Brandenburg-Ansbach
14. John George I, Duke of Saxe-Eisenach
7. Princess Eleonore Erdmuthe of Saxe-Eisenach
15. Johannetta, Countess of Sayn-Altenkirchen

== Bibliography ==
- Panton, Kenneth J. (2011). Historical Dictionary of the British Monarchy. Scarebrow Press, Inc. ISBN 978-0-8108-5779-7.
- Van der Kiste, John (1997) George II and Queen Caroline. Stroud, Gloucestershire: Sutton Publishing. ISBN 0-7509-1321-5.
