= Charles Maitland (physician) =

Scottish surgeon (c. 1668–1748)

- Born: c. 1668
- Died: 1748 (aged 79–80); Aberdeen, Scotland
- Years active: 1718–1723
- Medical career
- Profession: Surgeon
- Research: Inoculation

Charles Maitland (c. 1668 – 1748) was a Scottish surgeon who inoculated people against smallpox.

== Career ==
In March 1718, Lady Mary Wortley Montagu had Maitland, who was then serving in the British embassy in Constantinople, Turkey, inoculate her five-year-old son Edward. The process was done by an elderly Greek woman from Pera under Maitland's direction. Montague did not tell her husband until a week after when it proved to be successful.

They returned to London in April 1721, when Montagu requested that her daughter Mary, who was four, be inoculated. Maitland reluctantly agreed if there were other witnesses present, so three physicians from the Royal College of Physicians were there for the procedure, the first professional inoculation in England. One of the witnesses, James Keith, was so pleased by the success that he had Maitland inoculate his six-year-old son; Keith's other children had all died of smallpox. The Montague family promoted inoculation in England, calling it a "useful invention".

On 9 August 1721, Maitland received a Royal Licence that allowed him to test variolation on six prisoners from Newgate Prison. The experiment took place in August 1722, under the direction of Sir Hans Sloane. All prisoners survived, and they were pardoned later that year. One prisoner who was exposed to the disease proved to be immune.

In late 1722, Caroline of Ansbach ordered the inoculation of five orphans of St. James's Parish in London. Following their success, Caroline had Maitland inoculate her eldest son, Frederick and one other child.

The surgeon died in Aberdeen, Scotland, in 1748.

== See also ==
- List of surgeons
