= Martin Schöffel =

German politician (born 1977)

Member of the Landtag of Bavaria
- Incumbent
- Assumed office 20 October 2008
- Constituency: Wunsiedel im Fichtelgebirge (2008–2013); Wunsiedel, Kulmbach (2013–present)

Personal details
- Born: 21 April 1977 (age 49) Bayreuth, West Germany
- Party: Christian Social Union
- Education: Weihenstephan-Triesdorf University of Applied Science

Martin Schöffel (born 21 April 1977 in Bayreuth) is a German politician of the Christian Social Union who has been serving as a member of the State Parliament of Bavaria since 2008.

== Political career ==
Schöffel has been serving as State Secretary of Finance of Bavaria since 2023.

== Other activities ==
- KfW, Member of the Board of Supervisory Directors (since 2025)
- Messe München, Member of the Supervisory Board (since 2023)
