= Bayreuth Medical Center =

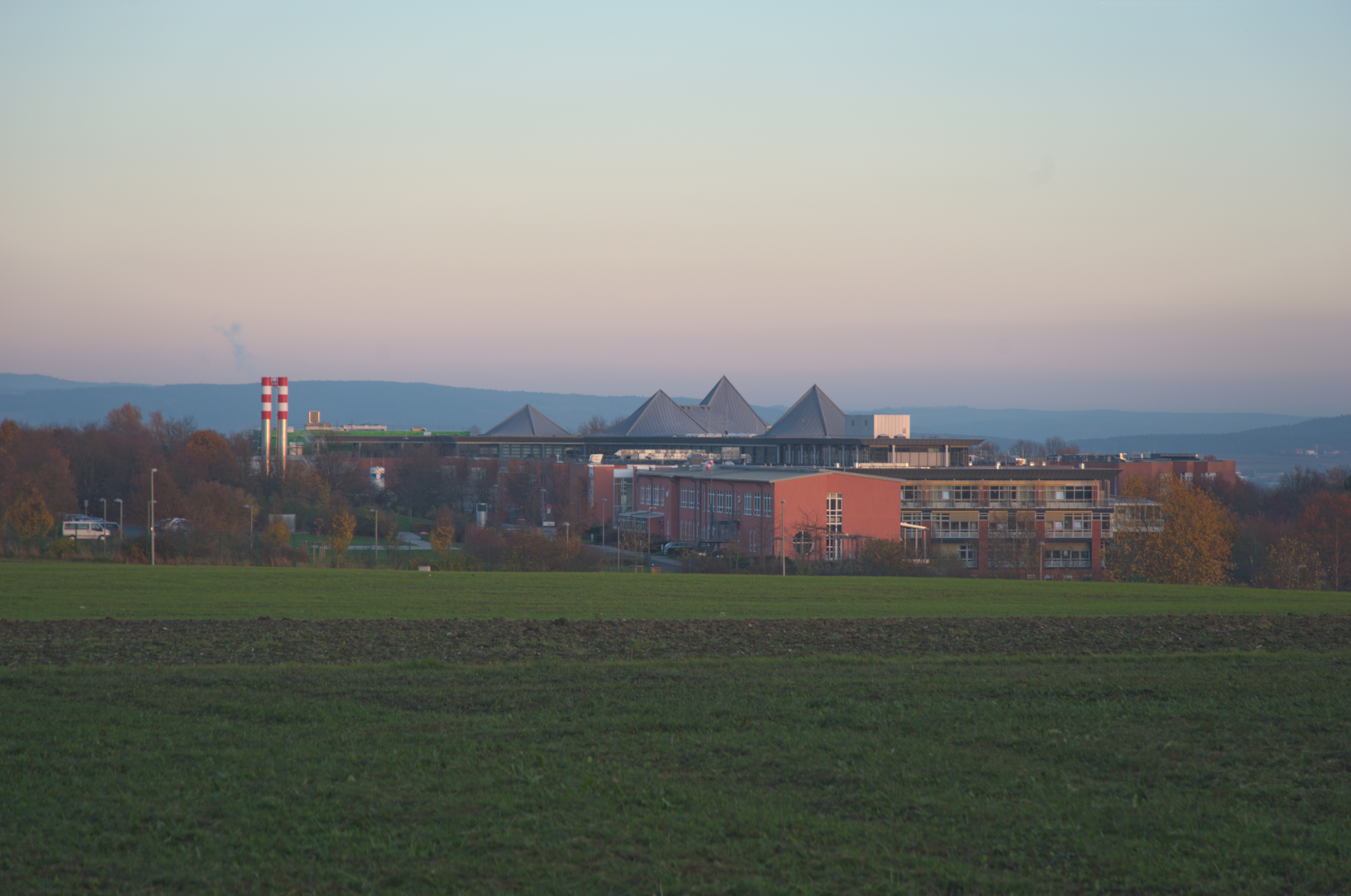

Geography
- Location: Bayreuth, Germany
- Coordinates: 49°56′38″N 11°31′57″E

Organisation
- Care system: German Health Insurance
- Type: Teaching hospital
- Affiliated university: University of Erlangen-Nuremberg

Services
- Emergency department: Yes
- Beds: 1086

History
- Opened: 1938

Links
- Website: www.klinikum-bayreuth.de

The Bayreuth Medical Center (German: Klinikum-Bayreuth) is the teaching hospital of the University of Erlangen-Nuremberg and is the largest hospital in Upper Franconia, Bavaria.

BMC was founded in 1938, and it is a maximum (tertiary) care hospital with 25 Clinics and Institutes and has the largest 24-hour Level I trauma Center (German: überregional Traumazentrum) in Upper Franconia.

With about 2300 employees and 294 training Vacancies The Bayreuth Medical Center is considered the largest employer in the Region.

== Patient care ==
Bayreuth Medical Center is a 1086-bed and provides a comprehensive range of inpatient, clinical and diagnostic services in medical specialties and subspecialties.
