= Bayreuth =

Town in Bavaria, Germany

- Town
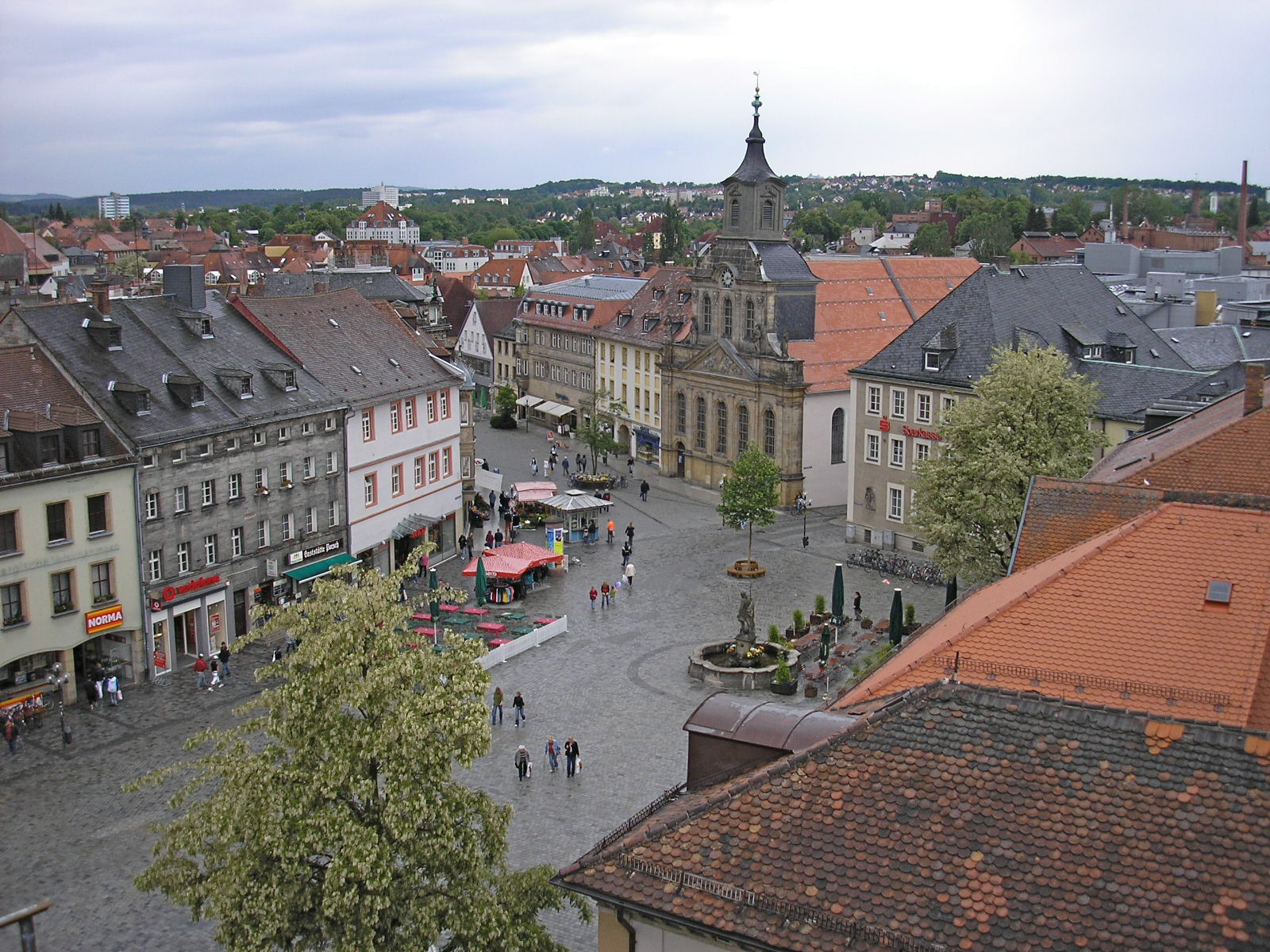
- Town square in 2006

- Flag Coat of arms
- Interactive map of Bayreuth
- Location within Germany Location within Bavaria
- Coordinates: 49°56′53″N 11°34′42″E
- Country: Germany
- State: Bavaria
- Admin. region: Upper Franconia
- District: Urban district

Government
  - Mayor (2026–32): Andreas Zippel (SPD)

Area
  - Total: 66.89 km^{2} (25.83 sq mi)
- Elevation: 340 m (1,120 ft)

Population (2025-12-31)
  - Total: 72,919
  - Density: 1,090/km^{2} (2,823/sq mi)
- Time zone: UTC+01:00 (CET)
  - Summer (DST): UTC+02:00 (CEST)
- Postal codes: 95401–95448
- Dialling codes: 0921, 09201, 09209
- Vehicle registration: BT
- Website: www.bayreuth.de

Bayreuth (German pronunciation: [ˈbaɪʁɔʏt] or [baɪˈʁɔʏt]; Upper Franconian: Bareid, pronounced [ba(ː)ˈɾaɪ̯t]) is a town in northern Bavaria, Germany, on the Red Main river in a valley between the Franconian Jura and the Fichtel Mountains. The town's roots date back to 1194. In the 21st century, it is the capital of Upper Franconia and has a population of 72,148 (2015). It hosts the annual Bayreuth Festival, at which performances of operas by the 19th-century German composer Richard Wagner are presented.

== History ==
=== Middle Ages and Early Modern Period ===
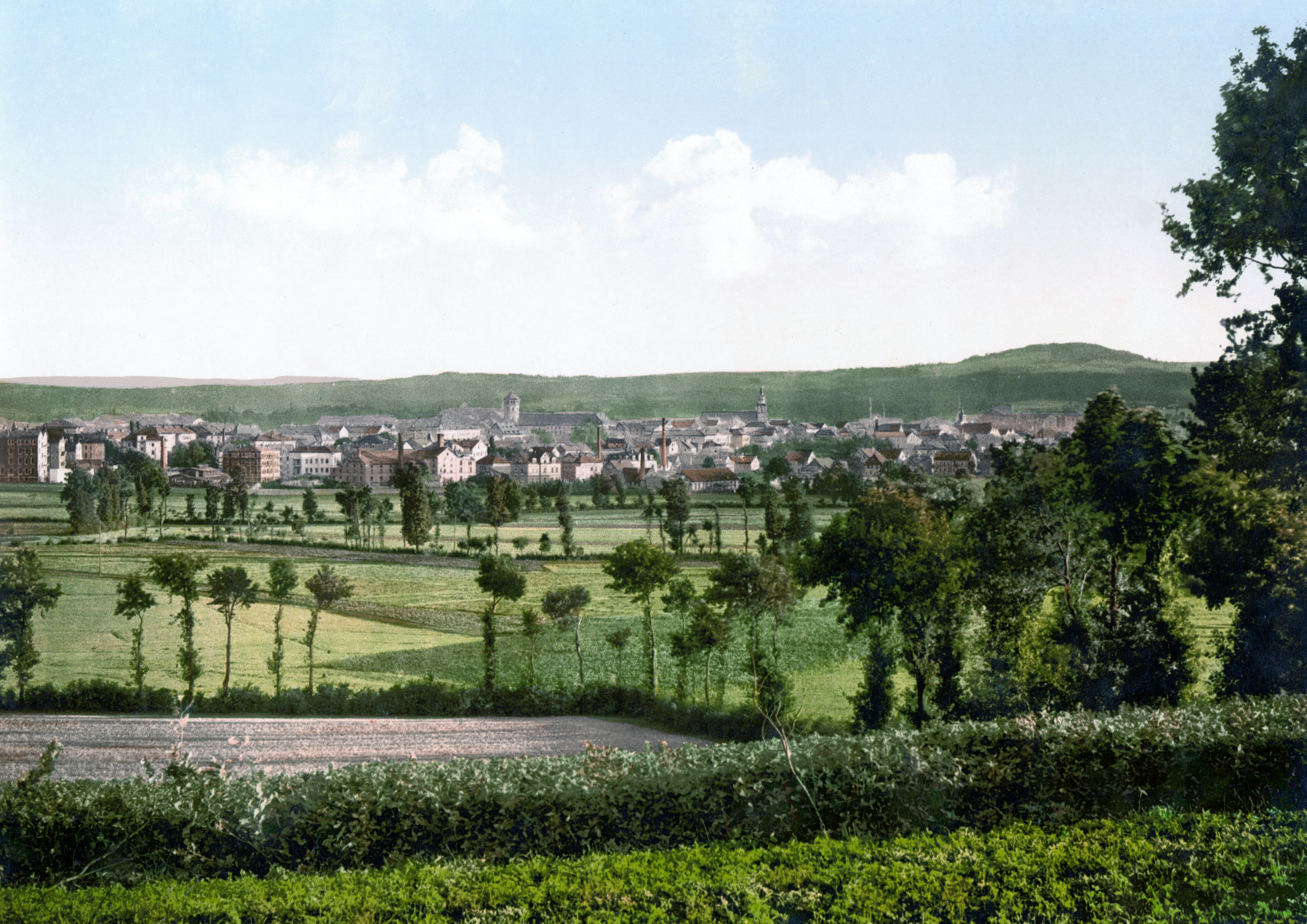
Bayreuth around 1900

The town is believed to have been founded by the counts of Andechs probably around the mid-12th century, but was first mentioned in 1194 as Baierrute in a document by Bishop Otto II of Bamberg. The syllable -rute may mean Rodung or "clearing", whilst Baier- indicates immigrants from the Bavarian region.

Already documented earlier, were villages later merged into Bayreuth: Seulbitz (in 1035 as the royal Salian estate of Silewize in a document by Emperor Conrad II) and St. Johannis (possibly 1149 as Altentrebgast). Even the district of Altstadt (formerly Altenstadt) west of the town centre must be older than the town of Bayreuth itself. Even older traces of human presence were found in the hamlets of Meyernberg: pieces of pottery and wooden crockery were dated to the 9th century based on their decoration.

While Bayreuth was previously (1199) referred to as a villa ("village"), the term civitas ("town") appeared for the first time in a document published in 1231. One can therefore assume that Bayreuth was awarded its town charter between 1200 and 1230. The town was ruled until 1248 by the counts of Andechs-Merania. After they died out in 1260 the burgraves of Nuremberg from the House of Hohenzollern took over the inheritance.

As early as 1361 Emperor Charles IV conferred on Burgrave Frederick V the right to mint coins for the towns of Bayreuth and Kulmbach.

In 1398 Bayreuth was partitioned from Nuremberg, becoming the Principality of Bayreuth (German: Fürstentum Bayreuth). Until 1604, however, the princely residence and the centre of the territory was the castle of Plassenburg in Kulmbach and as such the territory was officially known as the Principality of Kulmbach. The town of Bayreuth developed slowly and was affected time and again by disasters.

Bayreuth was first published on a map in 1421.

In February 1430, the Hussites devastated Bayreuth and the town hall and churches were razed. Matthäus Merian described this event in 1642 as follows: "In 1430 the Hussites from Bohemia attacked / Culmbach and Barreut / and committed great acts of cruelty / like wild animals / against the common people / and certain individuals. / The priests / monks and nuns they either burnt at the stake / or took them onto the ice of lakes and rivers / (in Franconia and Bavaria) and doused them with cold water / and killed them in a deplorable way / as Boreck reported in the Bohemian Chronicle, page 450".

By 1528, less than ten years after the start of the Reformation, the lords of the Frankish margrave territories switched to the Lutheran faith.

In 1605 a great fire, caused by negligence, destroyed 137 of the town's 251 houses. In 1620 plague broke out and, in 1621, there was another big fire in the town. The town also suffered during the Thirty Years' War.

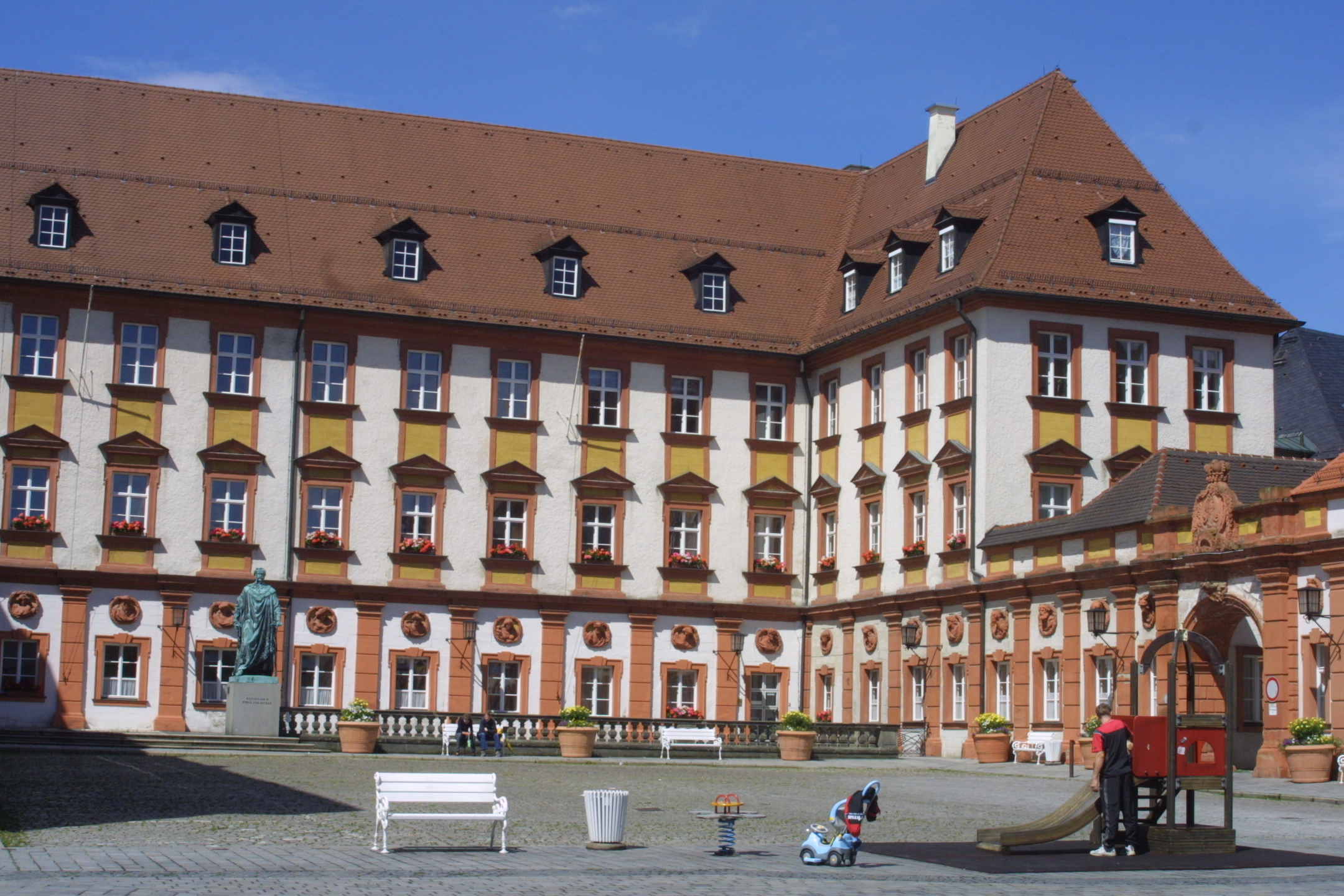
The Old Castle

A turning point in the town's history came in 1603 when Margrave Christian, the son of the elector, John George of Brandenburg, moved the aristocratic residence from the castle of Plassenburg above Kulmbach to Bayreuth. The first Hohenzollern palace was built in 1440–1457 under Margrave John the Alchemist. It was the forerunner of today's Old Palace (Altes Schloss) and was expanded and renovated many times. The development of the new capital stagnated due to the Thirty Years' War, but afterwards many baroque buildings were added to the town. After Christian's death in 1655 his grandson, Christian Ernest, followed him, ruling from 1661 until 1712. He was an educated and well-travelled man, whose tutor had been the statesman Joachim Friedrich von Blumenthal. He founded the Christian-Ernestinum Grammar School and, in 1683, participated in the liberation of Vienna which had been besieged by the Turks. To commemorate this feat, he had the Margrave Fountain built as a monument on which he is depicted as the victor of the Turks; it now stands outside the New Palace (Neues Schloss). During this time, the outer ring of the town wall and the castle chapel (Schlosskirche) were built.

=== 18th century ===
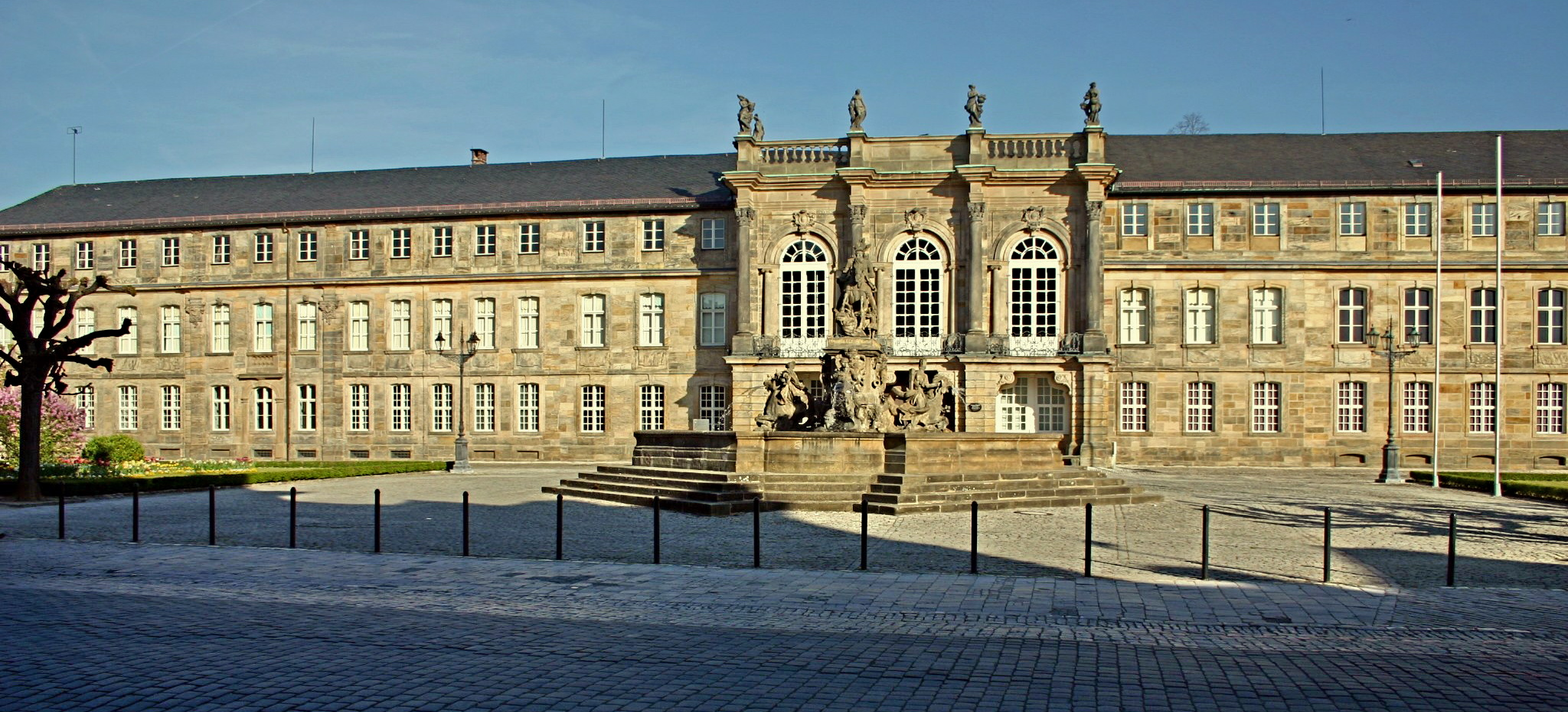
The New Castle

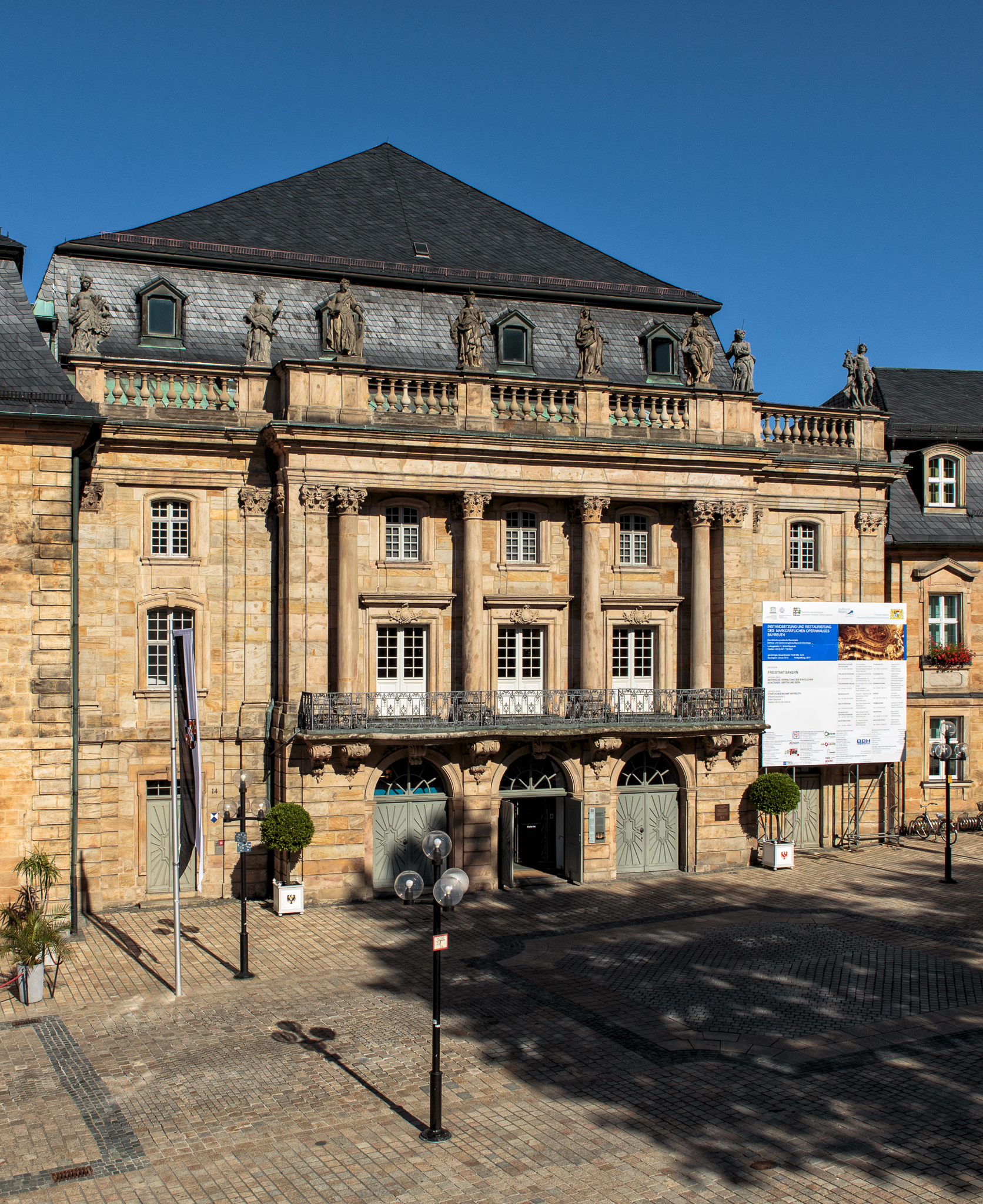
The Margravial Opera House (UNESCO World Heritage Site)

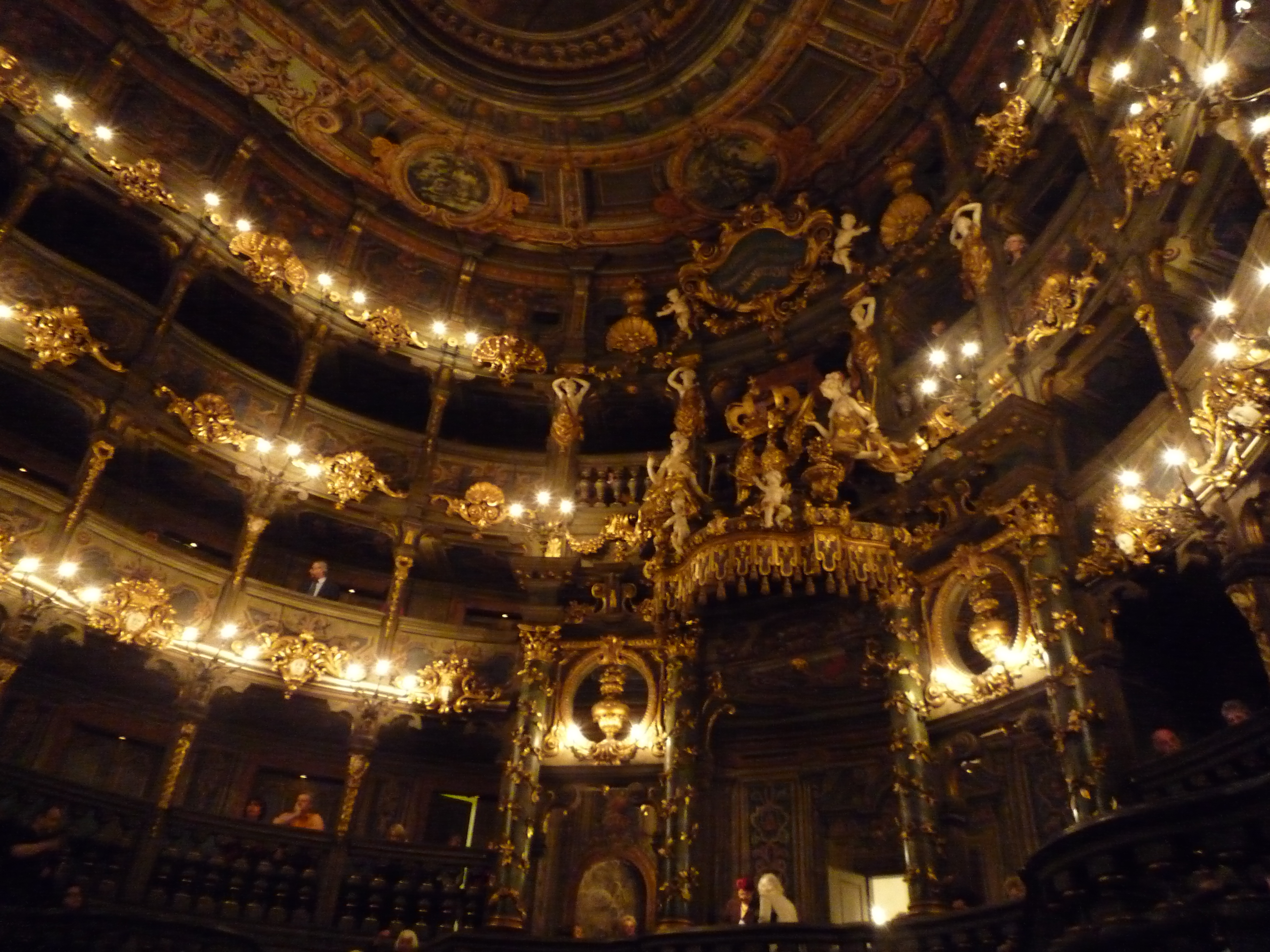
Margravial Opera House, interior

Christian Ernest's successor, the Crown Prince and later Margrave, George William, began in 1701 to establish the then independent town of St Georgen am See (today, the district of St Georgen) with its castle, the so-called Ordensschloss, a town hall, a prison and a small barracks. In 1705 he founded the Order of Sincerity (Ordre de la Sincérité), which was renamed in 1734 to the Order of the Red Eagle and had the monastery church built, which was completed in 1711. In 1716 a princely porcelain factory was established in St. Georgen.

The first 'castle' in the park of the Hermitage was built at this time by Margrave George William (1715–1719).

In 1721, the town council acquired the palace of Baroness Sponheim (today's Old Town Hall or Altes Rathaus) as a replacement for the town hall built in 1440 in the middle of the market place and destroyed by fire.

In 1735, a nursing home, the so-called Gravenreuth Stift, was founded by a private foundation in St. Georgen. The cost of the building exceeded the funds of the foundation, but Margrave Frederick came to their aid.

Bayreuth experienced its Golden Age during the reign (1735–1763) of Margrave Frederick and Margravine Wilhelmina of Bayreuth, the favourite sister of Frederick the Great. During this time, under the direction of court architects, Joseph Saint-Pierre and Carl von Gontard, numerous courtly buildings and attractions were created: the Margravial Opera House with its richly furnished baroque theatre (1744–1748), the New 'Castle' and Sun Temple (1749–1753) at the Hermitage, the New Palace with its courtyard garden (1754 ff) to replace the Old Palace which had burned down through the carelessness of the margrave, and the magnificent row of buildings in today's Friedrichstraße. There was even a unique version of the rococo architectural style, the so-called Bayreuth Rococo which characterised the aforementioned buildings, especially their interior design.

The old, sombre gatehouses were demolished because they impeded transport and were an outmoded form of defence. The walls were built over in places. Margrave Frederick successfully kept his principality out of the wars being waged by his brother-in-law, Frederick the Great, at this time, and, as a result, brought a time of peace to the Frankish kingdom.

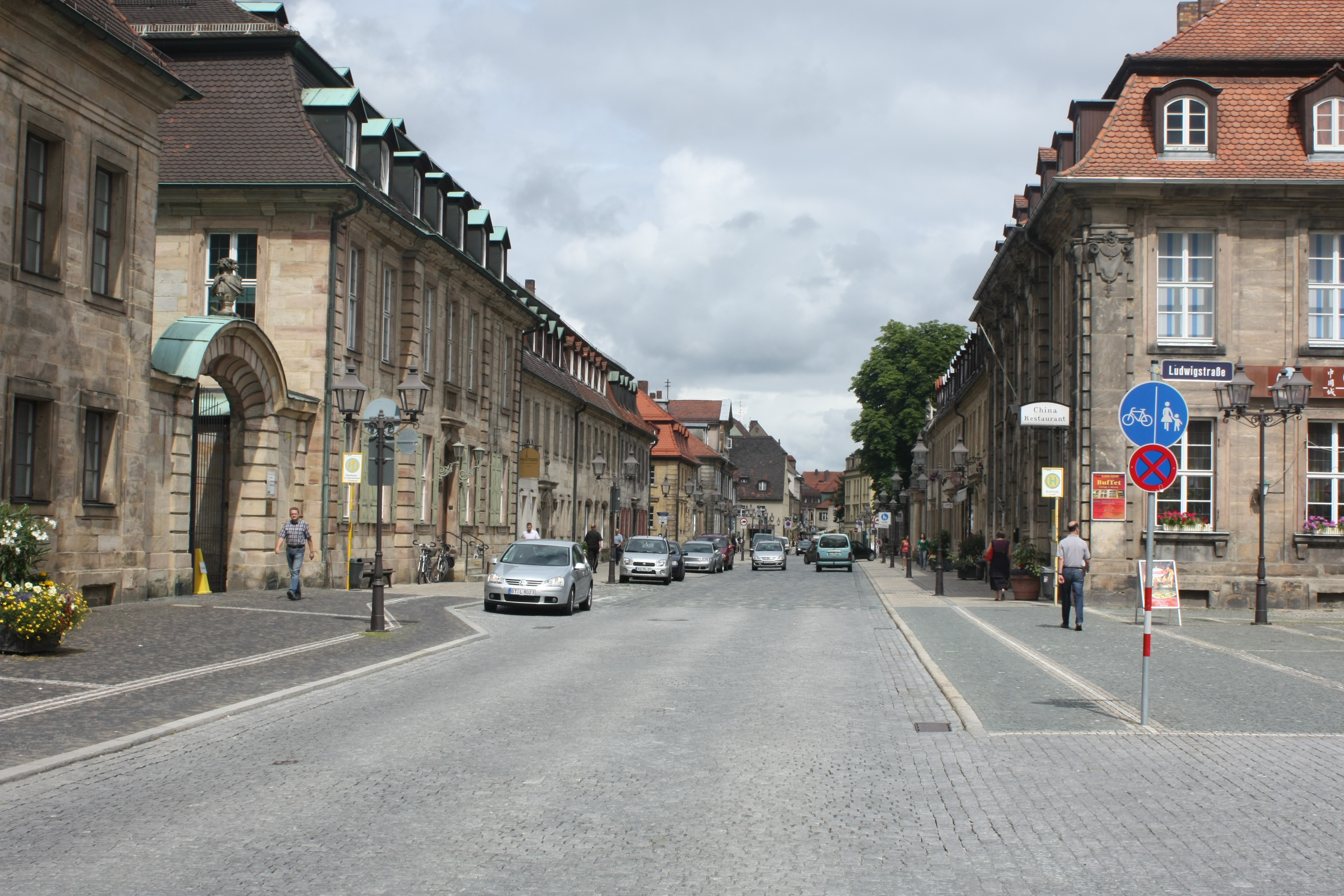
Friedrichstraße

1742 saw the founding of the Frederick Academy, which became a university in 1743, but was moved that same year to Erlangen after serious riots because of the adverse reaction of the population. The university has remained there to the present today. From 1756 to 1763 there was also an Academy of Arts and Sciences.

Roman Catholics were given the right to set up a prayer room and Jewish families settled here again. In 1760 the synagogue was opened and in 1787 the Jewish cemetery was dedicated.

Countess Wilhelmina died in 1758, and although Margrave Frederick married again, the marriage was short-lived and without issue. After his death in 1763, many artists and craftsmen migrated to Berlin and Potsdam, to work for King Frederick the Great, because Frederick's successor, Margrave Frederick Christian had little understanding of art. He also lacked the means due to the elaborate lifestyle of his predecessor, because the buildings and the salaries of the mainly foreign artists had swallowed up a lot of money. For example, the court – which under George Frederick Charles had comprised around 140 people – had grown to about 600 employees by the end of the reign of Margrave Frederick. By 1769 the principality was close to bankruptcy.

In 1769, Margrave Charles Alexander, from the Ansbach line of Frankish Hohenzollerns, followed the childless Frederick Christian, and Bayreuth was reduced to a secondary residence. Charles Alexander continued to live in Ansbach and rarely came to Bayreuth.

In 1775, the Brandenburg Pond (Brandenburger Weiher) in St.Georgen was drained.

Following the abdication of the last Margrave, Charles Alexander, from the principalities of Ansbach and Bayreuth on 2 December 1791 its territories became part of a Prussian province. The Prussian Minister Karl August von Hardenberg took over its administration at the beginning of 1792.

The town centre still possesses the typical structure of a Bavarian street market: the settlement is grouped around a road widening into a square; the Town Hall was located in the middle. The church stood apart from it and on a small hill stood the castle. Some sixty years later the town (at that time a tiny village) became subordinate to the Hohenzollern state, and when this state was divided, Bayreuth ended up in the County of Kulmbach.

=== 19th century ===
In 1804, the author Jean Paul Richter moved from Coburg to Bayreuth, where he lived until his death in 1825.

The rule of the Hohenzollerns over the Principality of Kulmbach-Bayreuth ended in 1806 after the defeat of Prussia by Napoleonic France. During the French occupation from 1806 to 1810 Bayreuth was treated as a province of the French Empire and had to pay high war contributions. It was placed under the administration of Comte Camille de Tournon, who wrote a detailed inventory of the former Principality of Bayreuth. On 30 June 1810 the French army handed over the former principality to what was now the Kingdom of Bavaria, which it had bought from Napoleon for 15 million francs. Bayreuth became the capital of the Bavarian district of Mainkreis, which later transferred into Obermainkreis and was finally renamed as the province of Upper Franconia.

As Bavaria was opened up by the railways, the main line from Nuremberg to Hof went past Bayreuth, running via Lichtenfels, Kulmbach and Neuenmarkt-Wirsberg to Hof. Bayreuth was first given a railway connection in 1853, when the Bayreuth–Neuenmarkt-Wirsberg railway was built at the town's expense. It was followed in 1863 by the line to Weiden, in 1877 by the railway to Schnabelwaid, in 1896 by the branch line to Warmensteinach, in 1904 by the branch to Hollfeld and in 1909 by the branch via Thurnau to Kulmbach, known as the Thurnauer Bockala (which means something like "Thurnau Goat").

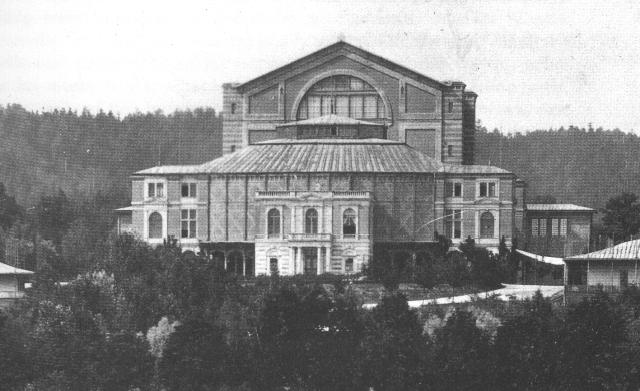
The Bayreuth Festspielhaus, as seen in 1882

On 17 April 1870 Richard Wagner visited Bayreuth, because he had read about the Margrave Opera House, whose great stage seemed fitting for his works. However, the orchestra pit could not accommodate the large number of musicians required, for example, for the Ring of the Nibelung and the ambience of the auditorium seemed inappropriate for his piece. So, he toyed with the idea of building his own festival hall (the Festspielhaus) in Bayreuth. The town supported him in this project and made a piece of land available to him, an undeveloped area outside the town between the railway station and Hohe Warte, the Grüner Hügel ("Green Hill"). At the same time Wagner acquired a property at Hofgarten to build his own house, Wahnfried. On 22 May 1872 the cornerstone for the Festival Hall was laid and, on 13 August 1876, it was officially opened (see Bayreuth Festival). Planning and construction were in the hands of the Leipzig architect, Otto Brückwald, who had already made a name for himself in the building of theatres in Leipzig and Altenburg.

In 1886, the composer Franz Liszt died in Bayreuth while visiting his daughter Cosima Liszt, Wagner's widow. Both Liszt and Wagner are buried in Bayreuth; however, Wagner did not die there. Rather, he died in Venice in 1883, but his family had his body brought to Bayreuth for burial.

=== 20th century ===
==== To the end of the Weimar Republic (1900–1933) ====
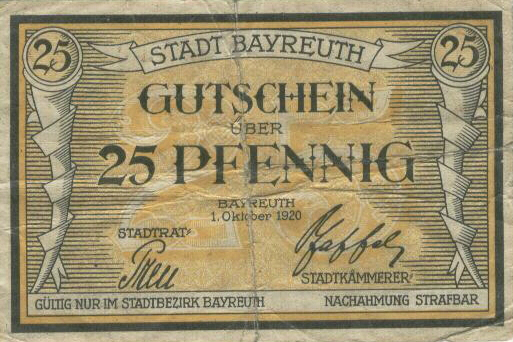
1920 emergency money: voucher for 25 pfennigs

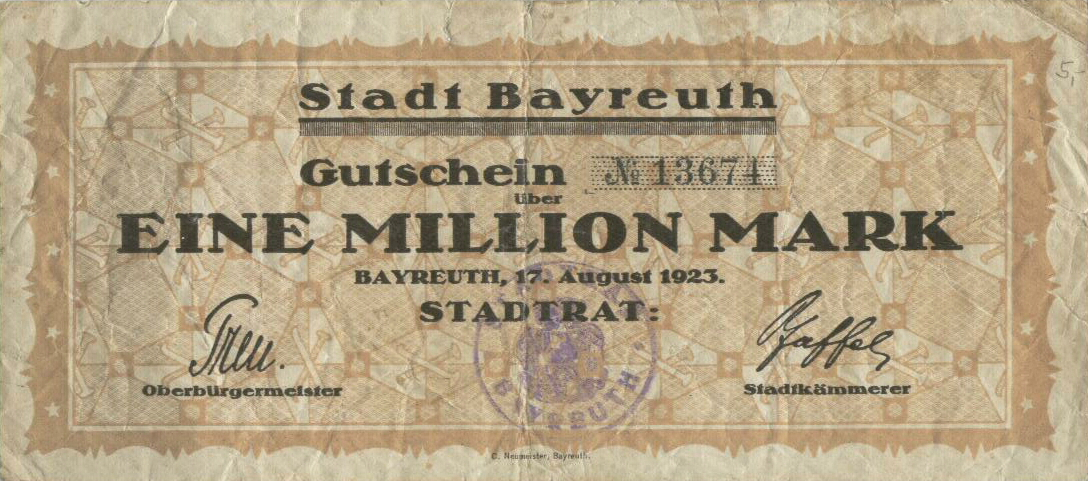
1923 emergency money: voucher for a million marks

The new century also brought several innovations of modern technology: in 1892, the first electric street lights; in 1908 a municipal electricity station, and, in the same year, the first cinema.

In 1914–15, one section of the northern arm of the Red Main was straightened and widened after areas along the river had been flooded during a period of high water in 1909.

After the First World War had ended in 1918, the Workers' and Soldiers' Council took power briefly in Bayreuth. On 17 February 1919, there was a three-day coup, the so-called Speckputsch, a brief interlude of excitement in the otherwise rather staid town.

In a series of völkisch and nationalist "Deutscher Tag" (German Days), the NSDAP organised the event in Bayreuth on 30 September 1923. More than 3,300 military and civilian people gathered (equivalent to 15% of the inhabitants), although Minister of Defence Otto Gessler had forbidden the participation of Reichswehr units. Among the guests were mayor Albert Preu as well as Siegfried and Winifred Wagner, who invited keynote speaker Adolf Hitler to Wahnfried house. There he met writer Houston Stewart Chamberlain, son-in-law of Richard Wagner and anti-semitic race theorist. Also on that day, Hans Schemm met Hitler for the first time.

In 1932, the provinces of Upper and Middle Franconia were merged and Ansbach was chosen as the seat of government. As a small compensation, Bayreuth was given the merged state insurance agency for Upper and Middle Franconia. Unlike the provincial merger, the merger of those institutions was never reversed.

==== Nazi era (1933–1945) ====
A stronghold of right-wing parties since the 1920s, Bayreuth became a center of Nazi ideology. In 1933, it was made capital of the Nazi Gau Bavarian Eastern March (Bayerische Ostmark, in 1942 Gau Bayreuth). Nazi leaders often visited the Wagner festival and tried to turn Bayreuth into a Nazi model town. It was one of several places in which town planning was administered directly from Berlin, due to Hitler's special interest in the town and in the festival. Hitler loved the music of Richard Wagner, and he became a close friend of Winifred Wagner after she took over the festival. Hitler frequently attended Wagner performances in the Bayreuth Festival Hall.

Bayreuth was to have received a so-called Gauforum, a combined government building and marching square built to symbolise the centre of power in the town. Bayreuth's first Gauleiter was Hans Schemm, who was also the head (Reichswalter) of the National Socialist Teachers League, NSLB, which was located in Bayreuth. In 1937 the town was connected to the new Reichsautobahn.

Under Nazi dictatorship the synagogue of the Jewish Community in Münzgasse was desecrated and looted on Kristallnacht but, due to its proximity to the Opera House it was not razed. Inside the building, which is once again used by a Jewish community as a synagogue, a plaque next to the Torah ark recalls the persecution and murder of Jews in the Shoah, which took the lives of at least 145 Jews in Bayreuth.

During the Second World War, a subcamp of the Flossenbürg concentration camp was based in the town, in which prisoners had to participate in physical experiments for the V-2. Wieland Wagner, the grandson of the composer, Richard Wagner, was the deputy civilian director there in late 1944 and early April 1945. Shortly before the war's end branches of the People's Court (Volksgerichtshof) were to have been set up in Bayreuth.

On 5, 8 and 11 April 1945 about one third of the town, including many public buildings and industrial installations were destroyed by heavy air strikes, along with 4,500 houses. 741 people were also killed. On 14 April, the U.S. Army occupied the town.

==== Post-war era (1945–2000) ====
After the war Bayreuth tried to part with its ill-fated past. It became part of the American Zone. The American military government set up a DP camp to accommodate displaced persons (DP), many of whom were Ukrainian. The camp was supervised by the UNRRA.

The housing situation was very difficult at first: there were about 53,300 inhabitants in the town, many more than before the war began. This increase was primarily due to the high number of refugees and expellees. Even in 1948 more than 11,000 refugees were counted. In addition, because many homes had been destroyed due to the war, thousands of people were living in temporary shelters, even the festival restaurant next to the Festival Hall housed some 500 people.

In 1945, 1,400 men were conscripted by the town council for "essential work" (clean-up work on damaged buildings and the clearing of roads). A significant number of historic buildings were demolished post-war but cultural life was soon back on track: in 1947 Mozart festival weeks were held in the Opera House, from which the Franconian Festival Weeks developed. In 1949 the Festival Hall was used for the first time again and there was a gala concert with the Vienna Philharmonic led by Hans Knappertsbusch. In 1951, the first post-war Richard Wagner Festival took place under the leadership of Wieland and Wolfgang Wagner. Wieland Wagner's fresh and non-traditional stagings "restored credibility to a theater that had been totally ruined by Nazi ideology."

In 1949, Bayreuth became the seat of the government of Upper Franconia again.

In 1971, the Bavarian State Parliament decided to establish the University of Bayreuth and, on 3 November 1975, it opened for lectures and research. There are now about 10,000 students in the town.

In May 1972, a serious accident occurred at the folk festival in the town, when an overcrowded carriage derailed and several people were thrown out. Four died and five were injured, some seriously. At that time, it was the worst disaster on a roller coaster since the Second World War.

In 1979, US Army serviceman Roy Chung disappeared from the area and allegedly defected to North Korea via East Germany.

In 1999, the world gliding championship took place at Bayreuth municipal airport.

=== 21st century ===
In 2006, Bayreuth chose its first CSU member and mayor, the lawyer, Michael Hohl, and, in 2007, a Youth Parliament, consisting of 12 young people, aged 14–17 years, was elected for the first time. The end of October saw the opening of the long-planned bus station and its associated office building on the newly created Hohenzollernplatz.

Largest groups of foreign residents
Nationality	Population (2013)
Turkey	938
Russia	434
Italy	364
China	336
Poland	291

=== Richard Wagner and Bayreuth ===
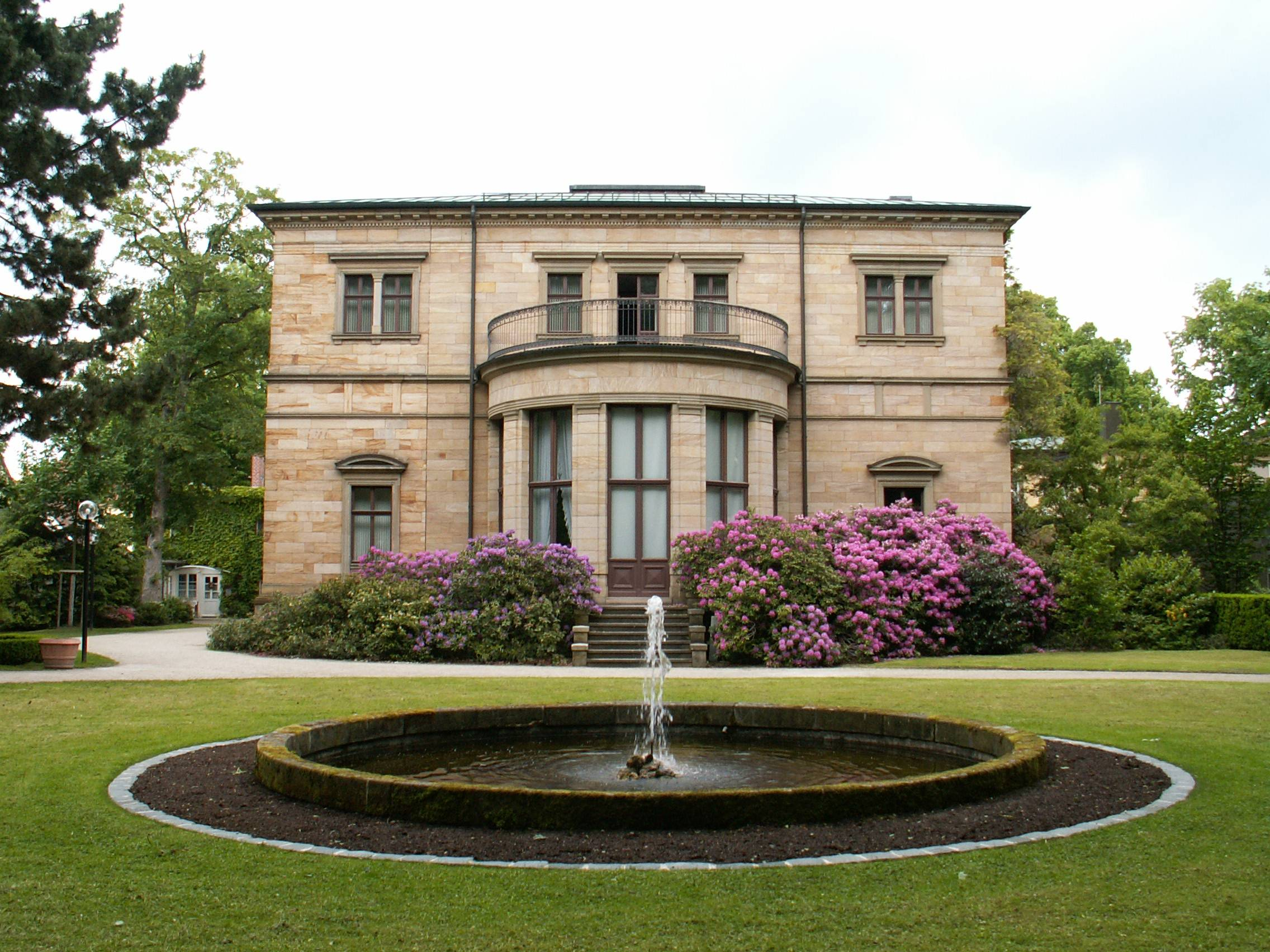
Wagner family home, Haus Wahnfried

The town is best known for its association with the composer Richard Wagner, who lived in Bayreuth from 1872 until his death in 1883. Wagner's villa, "Wahnfried", was constructed in Bayreuth under the sponsorship of King Ludwig II of Bavaria and was converted after World War II into a Wagner Museum. In the northern part of Bayreuth is the Festival Hall, an opera house specially constructed for and exclusively devoted to the performance of Wagner's operas. The premieres of the final two works of Wagner's Ring Cycle ("Siegfried" and "Götterdämmerung"); the cycle as a whole; and of Parsifal took place here.

Every summer, Wagner's operas are performed at the Festspielhaus during the month-long Richard Wagner Festival, commonly known as the Bayreuth Festival. The Festival draws thousands each year and has persistently been sold out since its inauguration in 1876. Currently, waiting lists for tickets can stretch for 10 years or more.

Owing to Wagner's relationship with the then unknown philosopher Friedrich Nietzsche, the first Bayreuth festival is cited as a key turning point in Nietzsche's philosophical development. Though at first an enthusiastic champion of Wagner's music, Nietzsche ultimately became hostile, viewing the festival and its revellers as symptom of cultural decay and bourgeois decadence – an event which led him to turn his eye upon the moral values esteemed by society as a whole – "Nietzsche clearly preferred to see Bayreuth fail than succeed by mirroring a society gone wrong."

== Geography ==
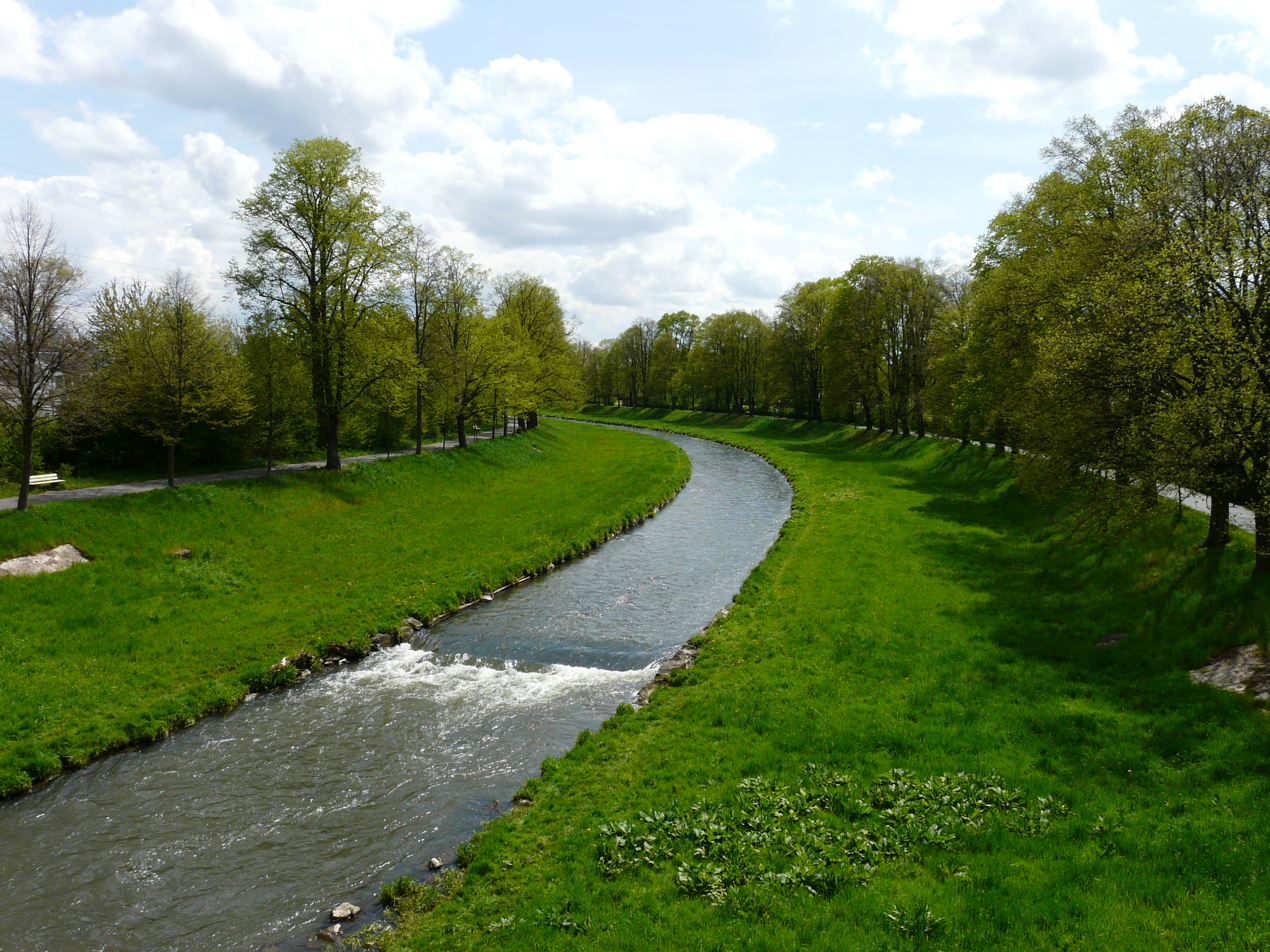
The Red Main in Bayreuth

=== Location ===
Bayreuth lies on the Red Main river, the southern of the two headstreams of the river Main, between the Fichtelgebirge Mountains and Franconian Switzerland. The town is also part of the Nuremberg Metropolitan Region.

=== Town divisions ===
The borough of Bayreuth is divided into 39 districts:

- 1: Westliche Innenstadt (Western town centre)
- 2: Östliche Innenstadt/Obere Röth (Eastern town centre)
- 3: Cosima-Wagner-Straße/ Nürnberger Straße/Universitätsstraße
- 4: Südöstliche Innenstadt (Southeastern town centre)
- 5: Südwestliche Innenstadt (Southwestern town centre)
- 6: Birken
- 7: Justus-Liebig-Straße/Quellhöfe/Rückertweg
- 8: Leuschnerstraße/Ludwig-Thoma-Straße
- 9: Saas, originated from the parish village Saas, which was mentioned as early as 1528 in connection with the Baptists
- 10: Bismarckstraße/Friedrichstraße/Moritzhöfen
- 11: Freiheitsplatz/Malerviertel
- 12. Erlanger Straße/Wolfsgasse
- 13: Jakobshof
- 14: Hetzennest/Braunhof/Fantaisiestraße
- 15: Meyernberg
- 16: Nördlicher Roter Hügel
- 17: Grüner Hügel/Wendelhöfen
- 18: Kreuz
- 19: Herzoghöhe/Am Bauhof
- 20: Nördliche Innenstadt
- 21: Carl-Schüller-Straße/Bürgerreuther Straße/Gutenbergstraße
- 22: Gartenstadt
- 23: Bürgerreuth/Gravenreutherstraße
- 24: Sankt Georgen (Bayreuth)/Grüner Baum/Burg
- 25: Östliche Hammerstatt
- 26: Westliche Hammerstatt
- 27: Bernecker Straße/Insel/Riedelsberg
- 28: Industriegebiete St. Georgen
- 29: St. Johannis
- 30: Neue Heimat
- 31: Oberkonnersreuth
- 32: Laineck
- 33: Westlicher Roter Hügel
- 34: Eubener Straße/Furtwänglerstraße/Schupfenschlag/Hohe Warte
- 35: Seulbitz
- 36: Aichig/Grunau
- 37: Thiergarten/Destuben
- 38: Oberpreuschwitz
- 39: Wolfsbach

=== Climate ===
Climate in this area has mild differences between highs and lows, and there is adequate rainfall year-round. The Köppen Climate Classification subtype for this climate is "Dfb" (Humid continental climate) using the 0 °C isotherm and "Cfb" (Marine West Coast Climate/Oceanic climate) using the −3 °C isotherm.

Climate data for Bayreuth
Month	Jan	Feb	Mar	Apr	May	Jun	Jul	Aug	Sep	Oct	Nov	Dec	Year
Mean daily maximum °C (°F)	1 (34)	3 (38)	8 (46)	13 (55)	19 (67)	23 (73)	25 (77)	24 (76)	21 (69)	14 (57)	6 (42)	2 (36)	12 (54)
Mean daily minimum °C (°F)	−4 (24)	−4 (25)	−1 (30)	2 (35)	6 (43)	9 (49)	11 (52)	11 (52)	8 (46)	4 (39)	0 (32)	−3 (27)	3 (38)
Average precipitation mm (inches)	46 (1.8)	33 (1.3)	36 (1.4)	43 (1.7)	56 (2.2)	61 (2.4)	71 (2.8)	69 (2.7)	46 (1.8)	46 (1.8)	43 (1.7)	48 (1.9)	590 (23.4)
Source: Weatherbase

== Politics ==
The current Member of the German Bundestag for Bayreuth is Silke Launert from the Christian Social Union in Bavaria.

=== Town council ===
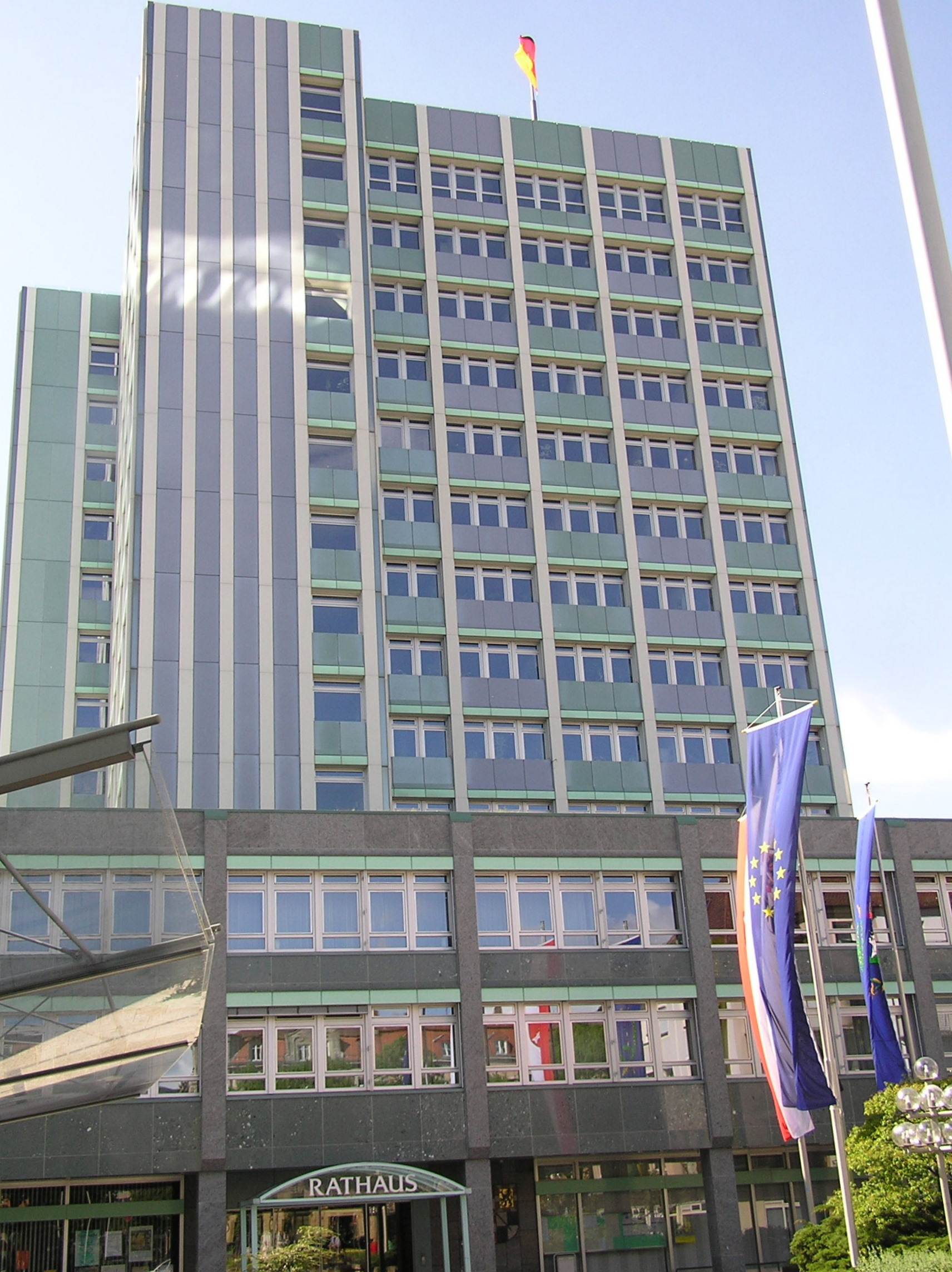
The town hall

The results of the 2026 local elections in Bavaria were as follows (in brackets the change from the 2020 elections):

- CSU: 24.0% (−0.1), 10 seats (=)
- Alliance 90/The Greens: 14.6% (−3.4), 6 seats (−2)
- SPD: 19.8% (+3.5), 9 seats (+1)
- BG – FW: 11.6% (−3.7), 5 seats (−2)
- AfD: 10.4% (+6.5), 5 seats (+3)
- The Independents: 5.0% (+0.2), 2 seats (=)
- Young Bayreuth: 4.8% (−1.7), 2 seats (=)
- FDP: 3.8% (−1.5), 2 seats (=)
- The Left: 5.7% (+4.0), 2 seat (+1)
- PRO Bayreuth: 1.6% (+1.6), 1 seat (+1)

=== (Lord) Mayors of Bayreuth since 1818 ===
- 1818–1848: Erhard Christian Hagen von Hagenfels (First legally trained mayor)
- 1851–1863: Friedrich Karl Dilchert (civic mayor)
- 1863–1900: Theodor von Muncker (legally trained mayor)
- 1900–1918: Leopold von Casselmann (legally trained mayor, lord mayor from 1907)
- 1919–30 April 1933: Albert Preu (lord mayor)
- 1 May 1933 – June 1937: Karl Schlumprecht (lord mayor; NSDAP)
- 21 July 1937 – April 1938: Otto Schmidt (lord mayor; NSDAP)
- 3 May 1938 – 30 June 1938: Fritz Wächtler (Gauleiter, self-proclaimed commissarial lord mayor; NSDAP)
- 1 July 1938 – April 1945: Fritz Kempfler (lord mayor; NSDAP)
- 24 April 1945 – November 1945: Joseph Kauper (lord mayor)
- November 1945–30 June 1948: Oscar Meyer (lord mayor)
- 1 July 1948 – 30 April 1958: Hans Rollwagen (lord mayor; SPD)
- 1 May 1958 – 30 April 1988: Hans Walter Wild (lord mayor; SPD)
- 1 May 1988 – 30 April 2006: Dieter Mronz (lord mayor; SPD)
- 1 May 2006 – 30 April 2012: Michael Hohl (lord mayor; CSU)
- 1 May 2012 – 30 April 2020: Brigitte Merk-Erbe (lord mayor; BG)
- 1 May 2020 – 2026: Thomas Ebersberger (lord mayor; CSU)
- Since 2026: Andreas Zippel (lord mayor; SPD)

=== Sponsorship ===
In 1955 Bayreuth took on sponsorship for displaced Sudeten Germans from the town of Franzensbad in Okres Cheb.

=== Coat of arms ===
Margrave Albert Achilles, who was also Elector of Brandenburg, presented the town of Bayreuth in December 1457 with the coat of arms that it still bears today. Two fields show the black and white coat of arms of the Hohenzollerns. The black lion on gold with a red and white border was the municipal coat of arms of the burgraves of Nuremberg. Along the two diagonals are two Reuten, small triangular shovels with a slightly bent shaft. They represent the ending -reuth in the town's name."

== Culture and places of interest ==
=== Theatre ===
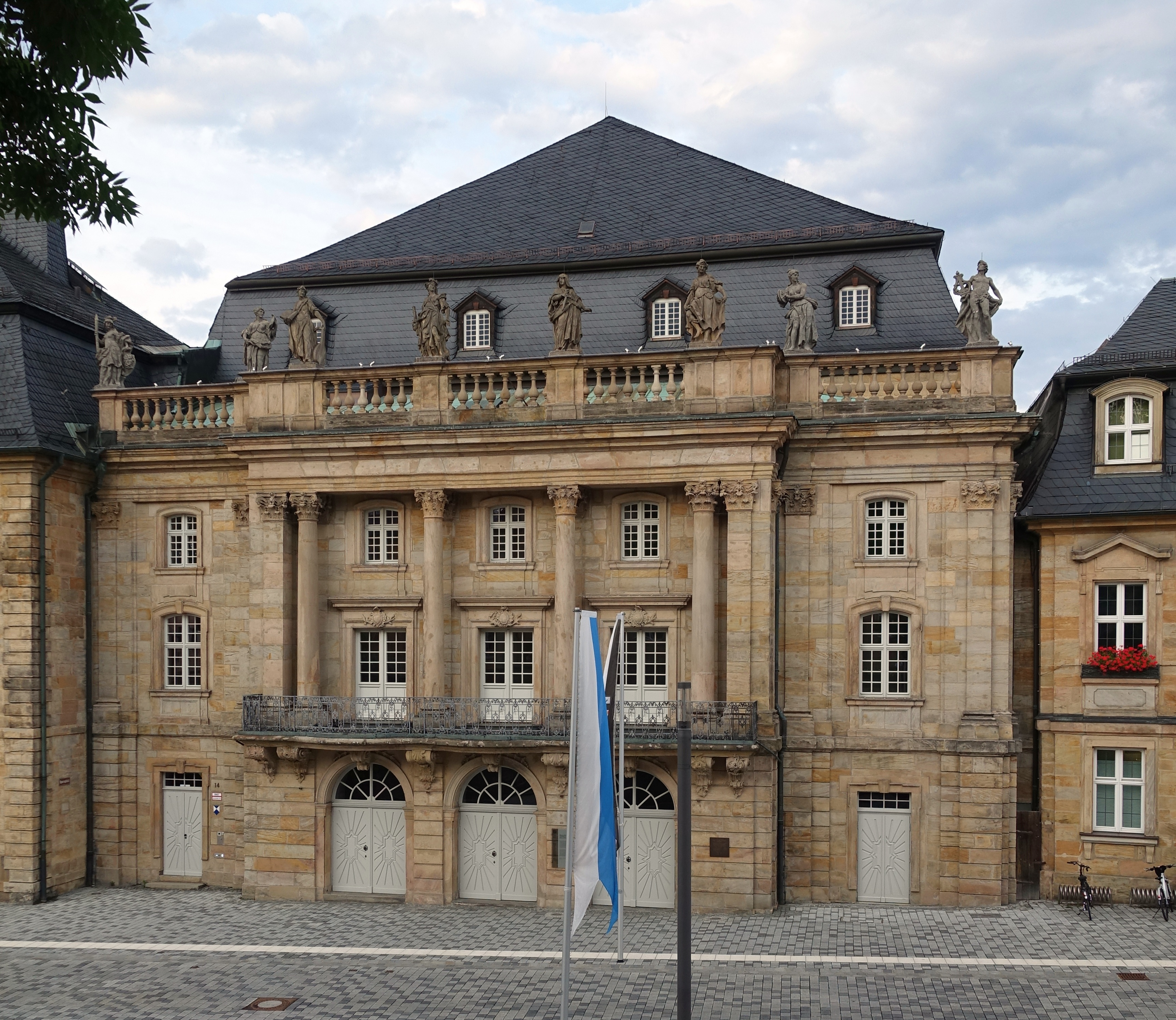
The Margravial Opera House

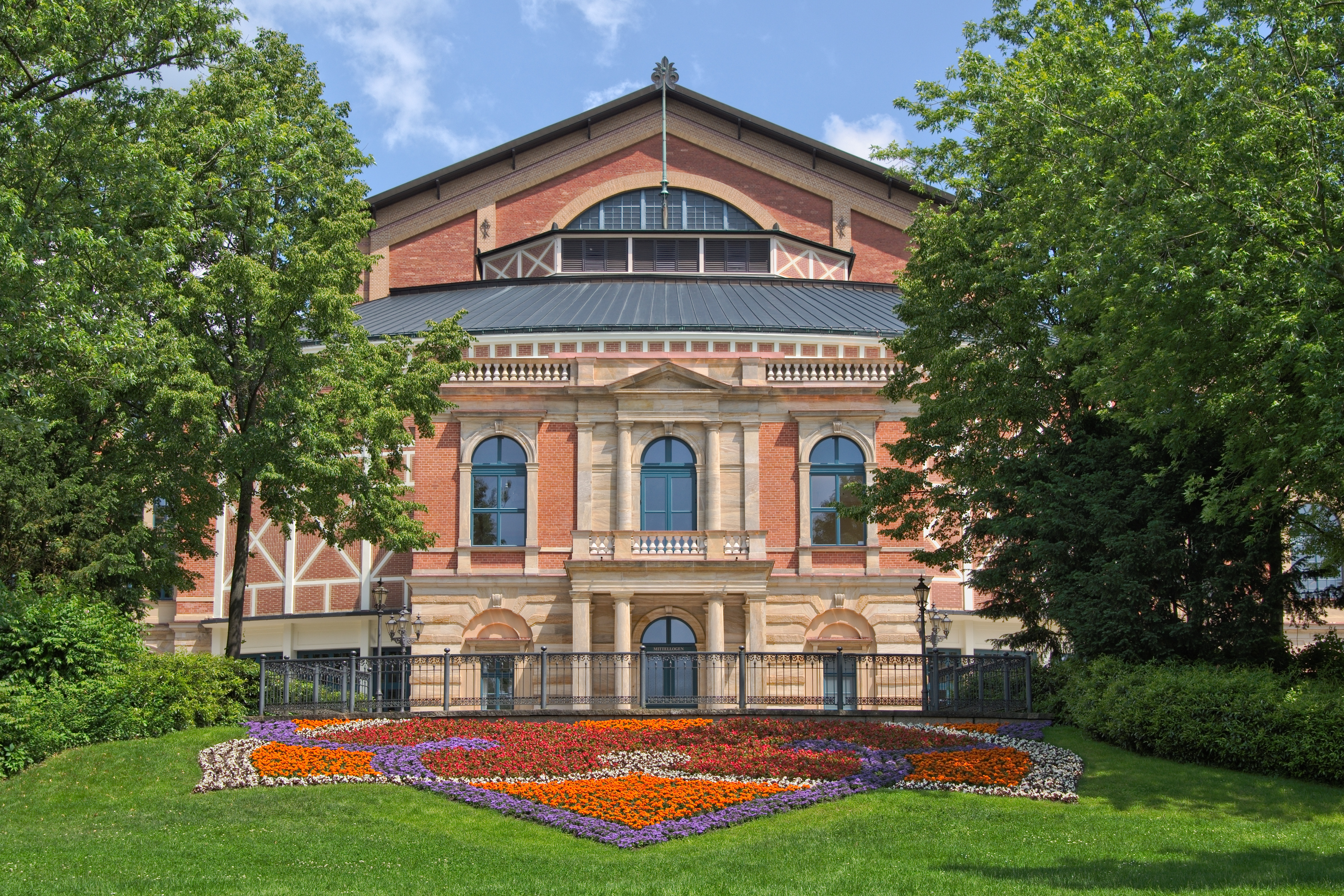
The Richard Wagner Festival Hall on the Green Hill in Bayreuth

The Margravial Opera House was opened in 1748 and is one of the finest Baroque theatres in Europe. The UNESCO World Heritage Site is both a museum and the oldest working tableau in Bayreuth.

The Festival Hall dates to the 19th century and is now used solely for the Bayreuth Festival. Only works by Richard Wagner are performed.

The former Stadthalle (lit.: city hall) did not have its own ensemble but was regularly used by the Theater Hof as well as various travelling theatres. It has been under reconstruction since 2017 and is supposed to be re-opened under the new name Friedrichsforum in 2023.

The only two theatres with their own ensemble are the Studiobühne Bayreuth and amateur dramatic society, Brandenburg Kulturstadt. The venues of the Studiobühne are the domicile of the theatre in the Röntgenstraße, the artificial ruins of the Hermitage and the courtyard of piano manufacturer Steingraeber & Söhne.

=== Museums ===
- The Richard Wagner Museum at Wahnfried House was the residence of Richard Wagner and his family's home until 1966. Since 1976 it has been a museum with attached national archives and a research centre for the Richard Wagner Foundation in Bayreuth.
- The Jean Paul Museum in the former residence of Richard Wagner's daughter, Eva Chamberlain, with autographs, first editions of works, portraits and other pictorial material.
- The Franz Liszt Museum in the house where Franz Liszt died, with about 300 photographs, scripts and printed papers from the collection of the Munich pianist, Ernst Burger, which were bought by the town of Bayreuth. In addition there is a Stummklavier, made by the Ibach company of Haus Wahnfried, letters and first editions of Franz Liszt. Biographic information boards, a mould of the font from Liszt's birthplace Raiding, Austria and Liszt busts by Antonio Galli enhance the collection. Visits are accompanied by the music of Franz Liszt.
- The Historical Museum in the Old Latin School on Kirchplatz. On the ground floor it portrays the history and development of Bayreuth from the late Middle Ages to the 20th century with a model of the town in the year 1763. On the first floor are divisions covering the art and cultural history of Bayreuth's margravial period (17th and 18th centuries). Another division portrays arts and crafts in Bayreuth and the surrounding area with examples of faience pottery, glass products from the Fichtelgebirge and stone pottery from Creußen. Painting, crafts, and early industrial artefacts from the Biedermeier period and the late 19th century round off a visit to the museum.
- The Museum of Art in the Old Town Hall which contains the Helmut and Constanze Meyer Art Foundation, the Georg Tappert collection and the archives and collection of Caspar Walter Rauh. The collections contain key works from the 20th century. They also include the Little Poster Museum (formerly a museum on its own, the collection was integrated into the Museum of Art in 2012) and the British American Tobacco's Historical Collection.
- The German Typewriter Museum with a collection of over 400 historic typewriters from the Research and Training Centre for Shorthand and Word Processing in Bayreuth.
- A branch of the Bavarian State Painting Collection was opened in the New Palace in August 2007. 80 works from Dutch and German painters of the late 17th century and 18th century are displayed.
- The Archaeological Museum in the Italian Building of the New Palace was founded in 1827 by the Historic Society. Its eight exhibition rooms include artefacts such as New Stone Age stone axes, 80 pottery jars from the Hallstatt era and Celtic bronze jewellery. The discoveries on display, which all come from eastern Upper Franconia, especially Franconian Switzerland and the region around Bayreuth, date from the Old Stone Age to the Middle Ages. In the experimental field there is a reconstructed loom, a rock drill and an original Schiebemühle.
- Maisel's Brewery and Cooper's Museum teaches everything about the production of Weizen beer on a 2,400 m^{2} (25,833 sq ft) layout, making it the largest brewery in the world, not least due to its collection of over 5,500 beer glasses and mugs.
- The Upper Franconia Prehistory Museum portrays the history of life in Upper Franconia since the beginning of the world. Exhibitions are constantly changing; currently the life-size dinosaurs attract especial interest.
- Bayreuth Football Museum (Altstadt-Kult-Museum of SpVgg Bayreuth)
- The Bayreuth of Wilhelmina Museum in the New Castle
- Fire Brigade Museum
- Iwalewa House, the Africa Centre of the University of Bayreuth
- Johann Baptist Graser School Museum
- Catacombs of the Bayreuth Aktien Brewery
- Margravial state rooms and collection of Bayreuth faiences in the New Castle
- Museum of Agricultural Tools and Equipment
- Lindenhof Natural History Museum
- Richard Wagner Gymnasium School Museum
- Wilhelm Leuschner Memorial
- Wo Sarazen Art

=== Buildings ===
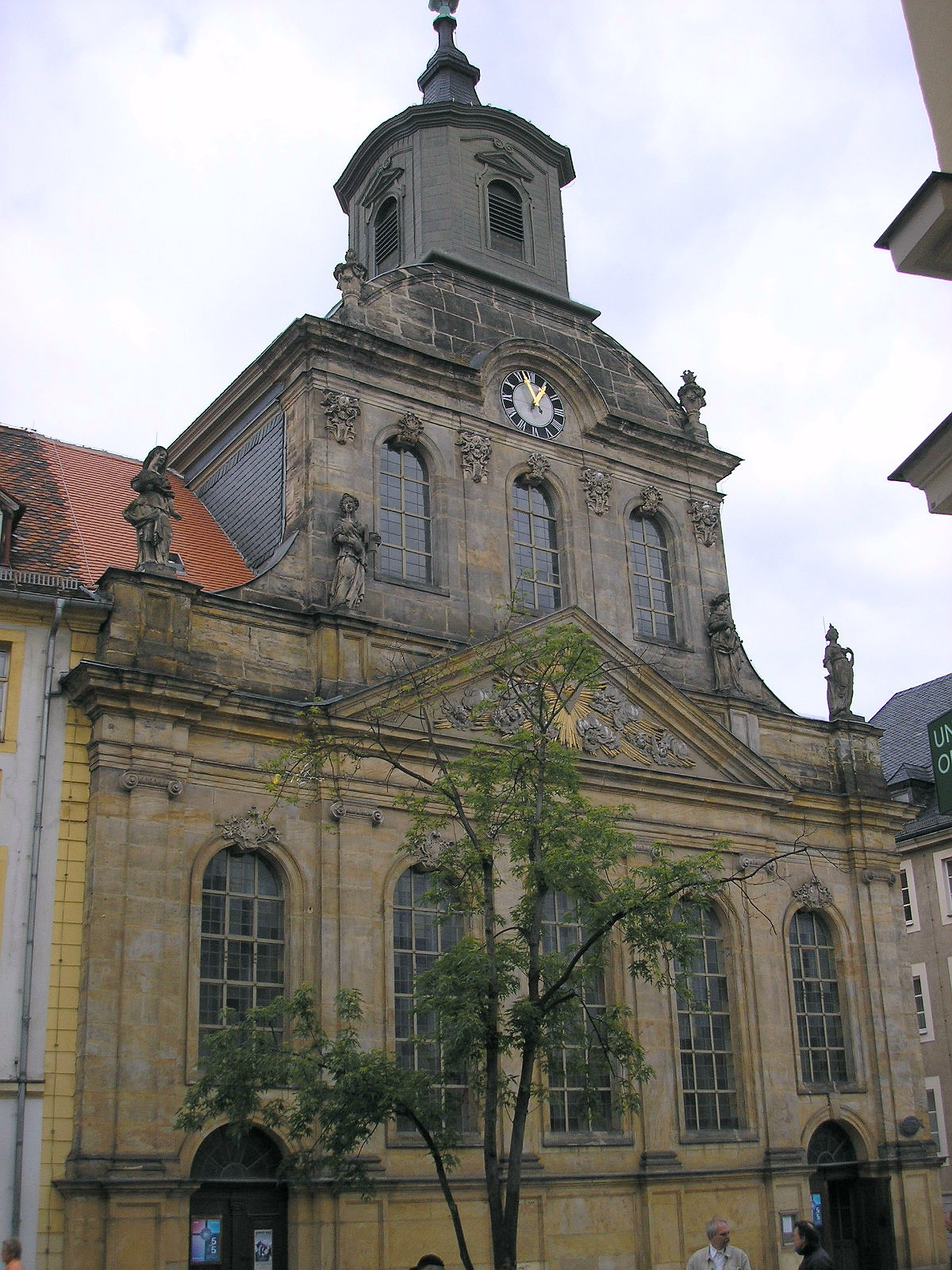
The Spitalkirche

- The Hermitage (Eremitage)
- Thiergarten Hunting Lodge (Jagdschloss Thiergarten)
- New Palace (Neues Schloss) and court garden, seat of the margraves from 1753
- St. Georgen Castle (Ordensschloss St. Georgen)
- St. Georgen Church (Ordenskirche St. Georgen)
- St. John's Parish Church (St. Johannis)
- Colmdorf Castle
- Rollwenzelei with Jean Paul's study (Dichterstube)
- Old Palace and castle chapel of Our Dear Lady (Altes Schloss)
- Victory Tower (Siegesturm)
- Spital Church (Spitalkirche)
- Church of the Holy Trinity (Stadtkirche Heilig Dreifaltigkeit)
- Stift church (Stiftskirche)
- Birken Castle
- The Goldener Anker hotel
- Baroque parks:
  - Hermitage Park, former seat of the margraves, outside the inner town
  - Castle and park of Fantaisie, in Eckersdorf (vicinity of Bayreuth. 7 km (4 mi) west)
  - Sanspareil Park, about 30 kilometres (19 miles) west of Bayreuth
- University Botanical Gardens
- Old building of the Klinikum Bayreuth, now used as the "load-balancing" branch of the Bundesarchiv ("Lastenausgleichsarchiv Bayreuth") mainly dealing with post-World War II Lastenausgleich compensation records

=== Public parks and cemeteries ===
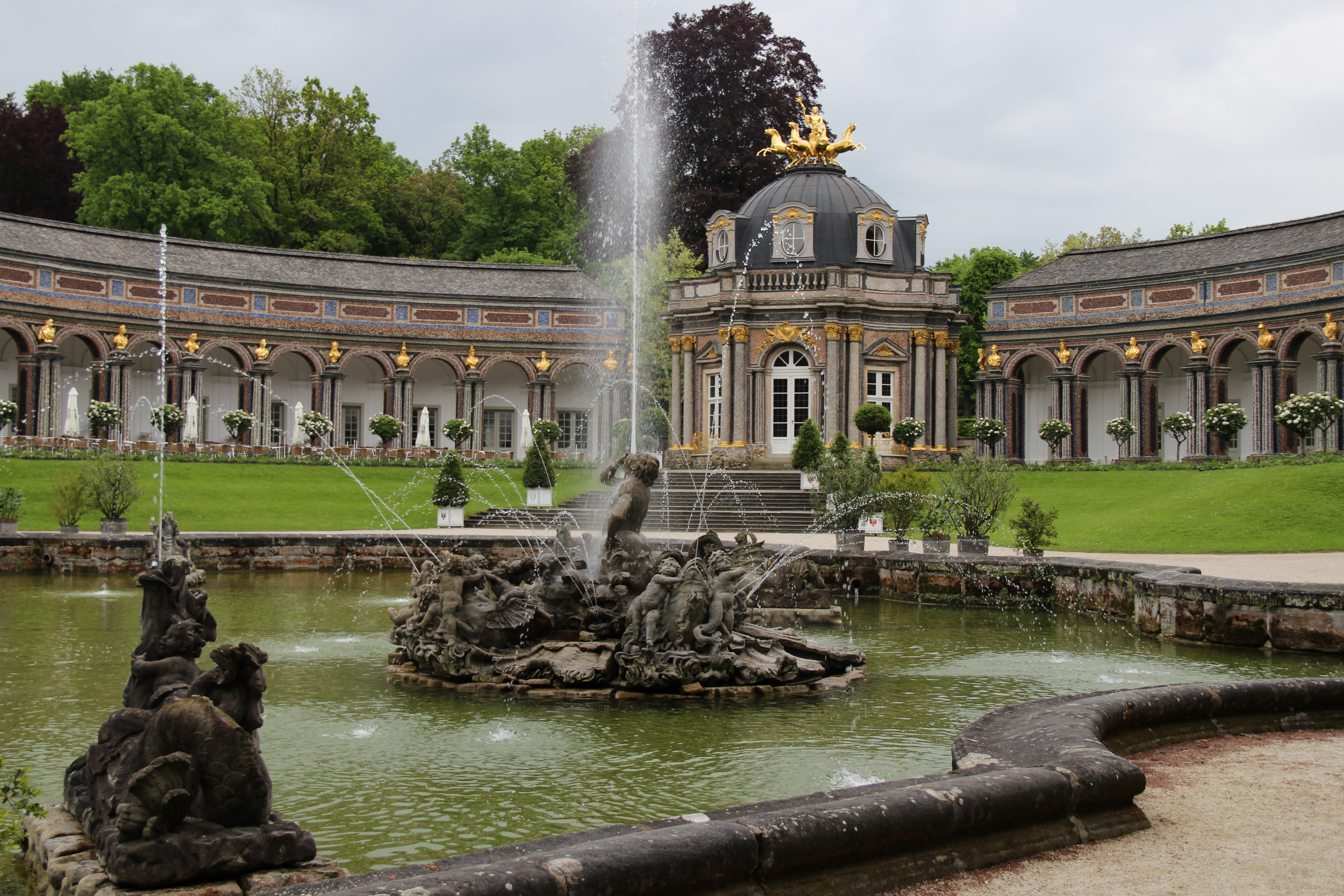
The Eremitage with its sun temple

In the town centre is the Court Garden (Hofgarten) of the New Palace. Near the Festival Hall is the Festival Park. On the southern edge of the town lie the Ecological-Botanical Garden of the University of Bayreuth. On the Königsallee, east of the town centre, is the relatively small Miedel Garden.

The best known park in Bayreuth is that of the Eremitage (Hermitage) in the district of St. Johannis. With a total area of almost 50 hectares, it is the largest park in Bayreuth.

Bayreuth has been chosen to host the Bavarian Country Garden Show in 2016. For this reason another park called Wilhelminenaue was built on the Main water meadows between the Volksfestplatz and the A9 motorway.

The oldest surviving cemetery is the Town Cemetery (Stadtfriedhof) with a large number of gravestones of famous people. On the southern edge of the town is the Southern Cemetery (Südfriedhof) and crematorium. The districts of St. Johannis and St. Georgen have their own cemeteries. On Nürnberger Straße, in the east of the town, is a Jewish cemetery.

=== Sport ===
Over 60 clubs offer just under one hundred sports. The most successful club in the town presently is the Bayreuth Air Sports Community with its gliding team: in 2002 and 2015 the pilots won the Federal Gliding League, and they also won the IGC-World League in 2015. The street hockey team of the Hurricans Bayreuth have been German runners-up three times (1998/2004/2006) and champions five times (1996/1997/2001/2005/2007). The basketball team of Medi Bayreuth plays in the Basketball Bundesliga (division 1), the HaSpo Bayreuth handball team, the footballers of SpVgg Bayreuth and the volleyball players of BSV Bayreuth each play in their respective Bavarian League. The ice hockey team, EHC Bayreuth, plays in the DEL2, the second highest ice hockey league in Germany.

Bayreuth had its sporting heyday in the late 1980s and early 90s. The basketball team, Steiner Bayreuth, were twice German Cup winners (1987/1988 and 1988/1989) and in the 1988/1989 season they also won the German championship. The hockey team of Bayreuth's swimming club (SCC) was twice champions of Second Division South and also played for a year in the Hockey League. At the time that the table tennis team of Steiner Bayreuth was also first class (since 1983 2nd Division, in 1984/85, 1986/87 and 1987/88 1st Division, 1988 relegated and the team has played for many years in the 2nd Football Division. The table tennis players of the 1. Bayreuth FC played in the 1st Division from 1994 to 1997.

In 1999 the World Glider Championships took place in Bayreuth.

=== Regular events ===
- In January, May, June, July, November and December: Young master pianists (concert series for young pianists from various music academies in the rooms of piano makers, Steingraeber & Söhne)
- April: Bayreuth Easter Festival (charity concerts for children with cancer)
- May: Musica Bayreuth
- June: Uniopenair
- June: Time for New Music
- June: Bayreuth Folk Festival
- July: Bayreuth Town Festival (on the first weekend in July)
- July: Bayreuth Piano Festival
- July–August: Bayreuth Festival, Midsummer Night Festival
- September: Rock in Bayreuth
- September: Bayreuth Baroque (opera performances in the Margravial Opera House)
- October: Bayreuth Kneipen Festival
- October: Bayreuth Museum Night (the day before the clocks go back)
- October: Since 2008 the town had awarded annually the Margravine Wilhelmina Prize of the Town of Bayreuth as part of the Bayreuth Future Forum symposium of the University of Bayreuth

== Economy and infrastructure ==
=== Transport ===
==== Long-distance roads ====
Motorways (Autobahnen):

- A 9: Berlin–Leipzig–Bayreuth–Nuremberg–Ingolstadt–Munich
- A 70: Schweinfurt–Bamberg–Bayreuth

Federal roads (Bundesstraßen):

- B 2: Rosow–Berlin–Lutherstadt Wittenberg–Leipzig–Gera–Hof–Bayreuth–Nuremberg–Donauwörth–Augsburg–Munich–Mittenwald
- B 22: Würzburg–Bamberg–Hollfeld–Bayreuth–Weiden–Cham
- B 85: Berga–Weimar–Ludwigsstadt–Kulmbach–Bayreuth–Amberg–Schwandorf–Cham–Neukirchen vorm Wald–Passau

==== Railways ====
From Bayreuth Central Station (Hauptbahnhof) railway lines run north to Neuenmarkt-Wirsberg, and from there to Bamberg and over the Schiefe Ebene to Hof, east to Weidenberg, southeast to Weiden and south to Schnabelwaid with connections to Nuremberg on the Pegnitz Valley Railway. The lines around Bayreuth are all single-tracked and non-electrified.

Since 23 May 1992 tilting Class 610 diesel multiple units have worked the Pegnitz Valley route. These were bought by the former Deutsche Bundesbahn specifically for the winding track.

Since a 2006/2007 timetable change, Bayreuth has no longer been connected to the DB's long-distance network. However, the Franken-Sachsen-Express still provides a direct connection to Dresden (since December 2007, every two hours). This service is worked by Class 612 diesel multiple units. There are also Regional-Express links via Lichtenfels to Bamberg and Würzburg, and via Lichtenfels and Kronach to Saalfeld.

==== Local public transport ====
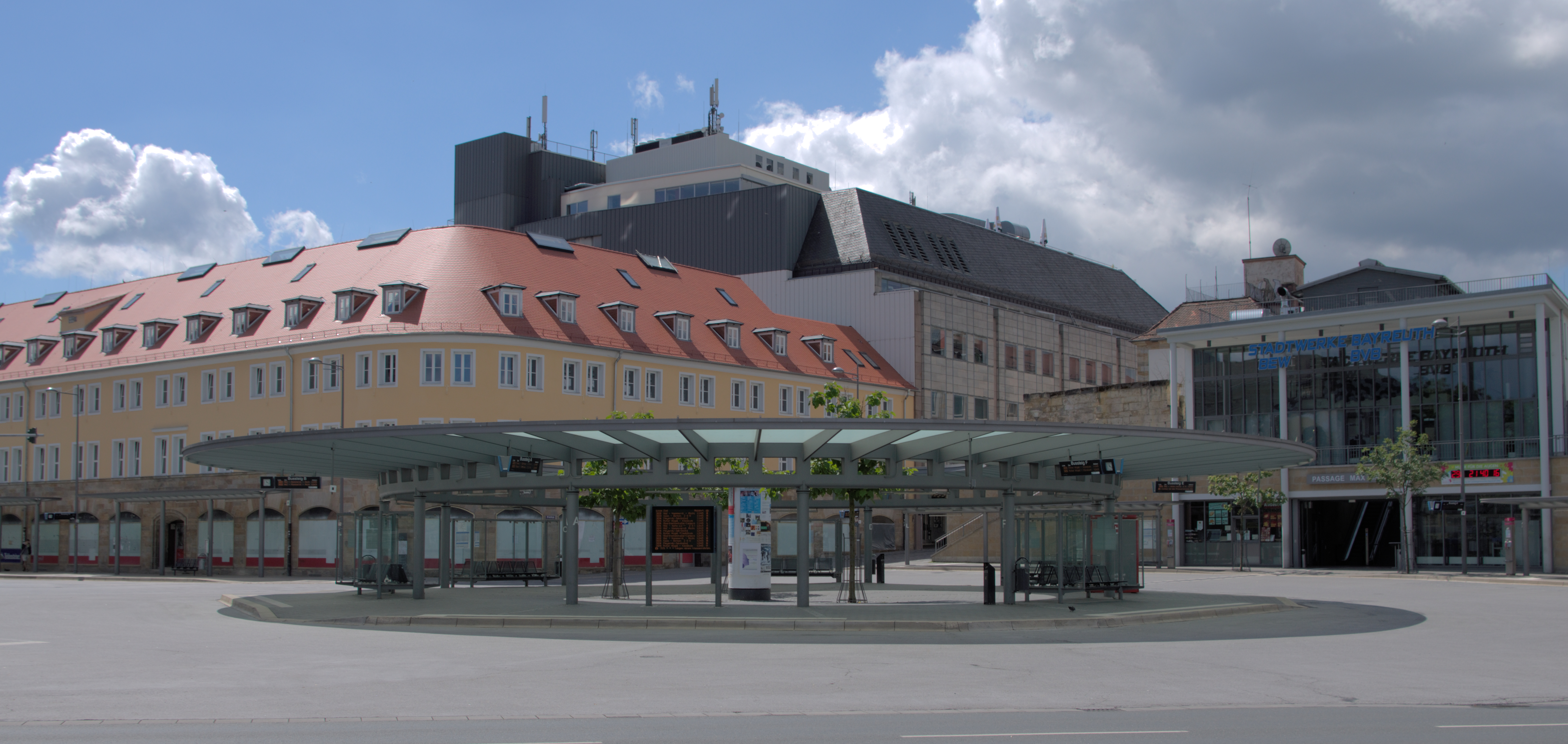
The central bus station (ZOH) at the Hohenzollernplatz

The town bus routes are operated by Bayreuth Transport and Public Baths (BVB) (Bayreuther Verkehrs- und Bäder GmbH). Sometimes private bus operators run services on behalf of the transport companies. The 15 routes (lines 301–315) operate from Monday to Friday at 20 or 30-minute intervals; on Saturday and Sunday the interval is extended to 30 minutes. Late evening services (from about 20 to 12 pm during the week and to 1 am at weekends), on Sunday mornings a simplified network of six lines (lines 321–326) runs buses at 30-minute intervals. Some lines then operate like an on-call taxi service. The network is star-shaped. Originally, the central station was at the market square in Maximilianstrasse. Since 27 October 2007 the Central Bus Station (ZOH) has been at Hohenzollernplatz at the junction of Kanalstraße on the Hohenzollernring. At this stop there are also bus stops for local buses to facilitate transfers.

Regional rail is operated by the Omnibusverkehr Franken. From 1 January 2010 public transport from the town and district of Bayreuth was integrated into the Nuremberg Regional Transport Network (Verkehrsverbund Großraum Nürnberg).

==== Cycling ====
In most places there is a signed cycle path network. In the centre of Bayreuth itself, cycling is fairly straightforward due to the relatively flat topography, something which encourages the use bicycles as an everyday means of transport. Because of the proximity of the 600 kilometre long Main Cycleway, Bayreuth is also a destination for many tourist cycle routes. Because of the long service intervals of the Bayreuth town bus system and its long overnight pause, students use bicycles as their everyday mode of transport. Bicycles may be carried for a fee on DB Regio trains leaving Bayreuth and in the VGN's buses.

==== Air transport ====
The local airport supports Bayreuth's commercial aviation traffic, individual business travel, general aviation and air sports. There is no commercial service any more: In 2001, the service which used to operate three times a day from Frankfurt via Bayreuth to Hof, stopped service.

The airfield at Bindlacher Berg is also one of the most important bases for gliding in Germany. For example, the World Championships took place here in 1999. For the air sports community in Bayreuth, the airport is a departure point for glider flights taking part in the national Bundesliga competition league. The local gliding club also provides instruction in flying gliders and light aircraft. The nearest international airport is Nuremberg Airport, which is located 85 km (53 mi) south of Bayreuth.

=== Important firms ===
- Basell Bayreuth Chemie (Producer of polyolefins)
- Brauerei Gebrüder Maisel (wheat beer specialist)
- British American Tobacco (Germany) GmbH (cigarette production)
- Cherry (Data entry devices, switches and sensors, car motifs)
- Cybex
- Grundig Business Systems (world market leader for professional dictaphone systems)
- W. Markgraf (construction)
- medi (medical aids)
- Stäubli (textile machines, technical couplings and robot arms)
- Steingraeber & Söhne piano manufacturers
- TenneT TSO system operator
- Zapf (manufacturer of ready-made garages and houses)
- Trans Space Travels (Private space plane development firm)

=== Former important firms ===
- F. C. Bayerlein 1809–1979 (textile company: weaving, spinning, cotton-spinning and dying)

=== Media ===
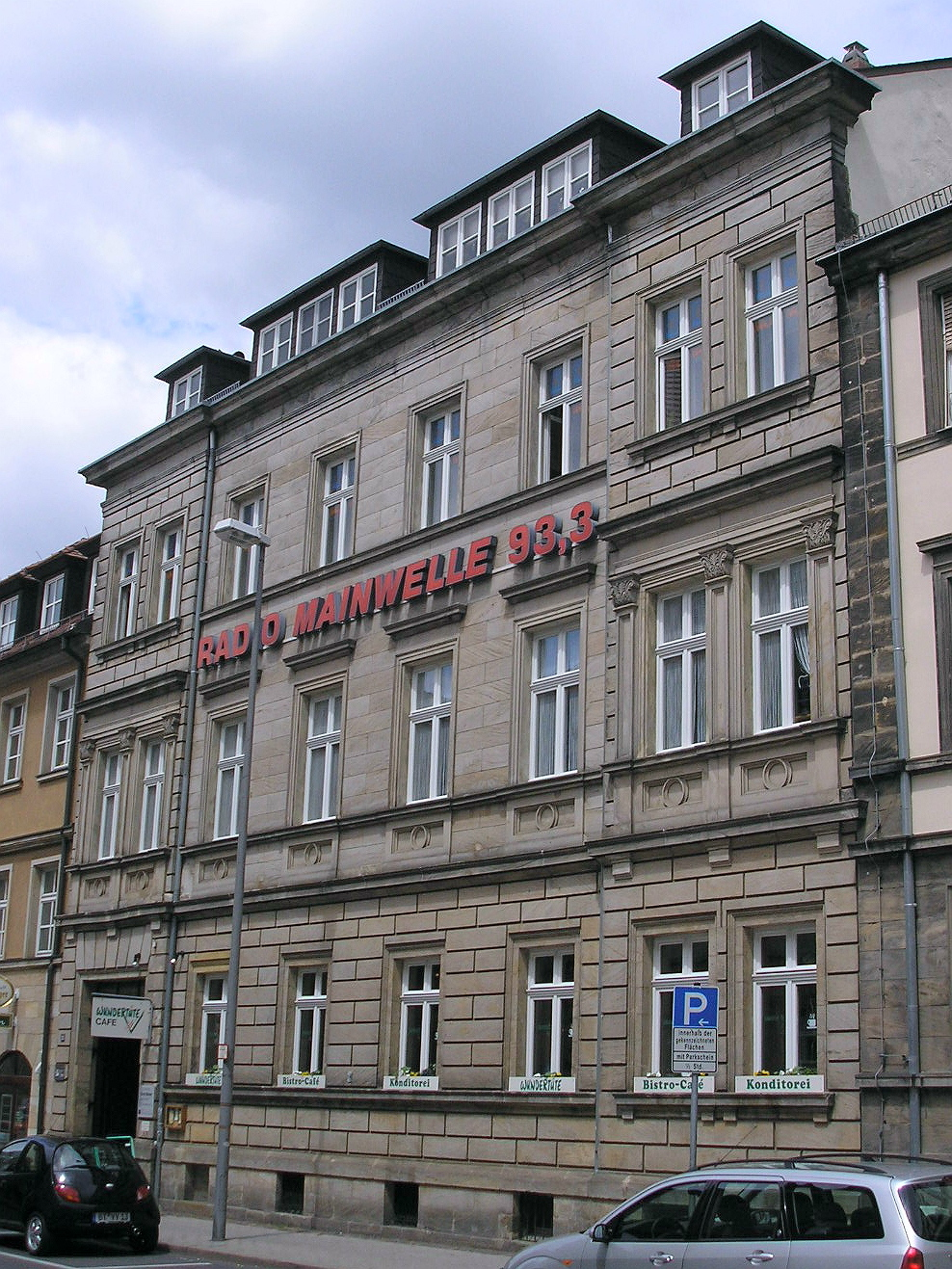
Radio Mainwelle

- Nordbayerischer Kurier (daily paper)
- Fränkische Zeitung (FZ); formerly the Bayreuther Anzeiger, renamed in October 2008 (advertising paper)
- Bayreuther Sonntag (advertising paper)
- Bayreuth4U (town magazine)
- Bayerischer Rundfunk (North Upper Franconia correspondent office). In the 1950s/1960s Bayerische Rundfunk operated a radio station in Bayreuth on medium wave with a frequency of 520 kHz and a transmitter power of 200 watts using a 60-metre high transmission mast.
- Campus TV (University of Bayreuth media project in media science)
- Der Tip (University of Bayreuth student paper)
- Oberfränkische Wirtschaft, (trade magazine for Upper Franconia)
- Radio Galaxy (local radio station for the Bavaria-wide youth radio)
- Radio Mainwelle (local radio)
- Schalltwerk (University of Bayreuth internet radio)

=== Garrison ===
For centuries Bayreuth was also a garrison town for the Prussian Army, Royal Bavarian Army, Reichswehr, Wehrmacht, US Army, German Army (Bundeswehr) and the German Border Police (Bundesgrenzschutz). In the early 1990s, following the end of the Cold War the garrison tradition of the town came to an end when the Bundeswehr's Margrave Barracks (Markgrafenkaserne) and the Röhrensee Barracks (Röhrenseekaserne), used by the US Army and the BGS (Grenzschutzabteilung Süd 3), were closed.

== Twin towns – sister cities ==
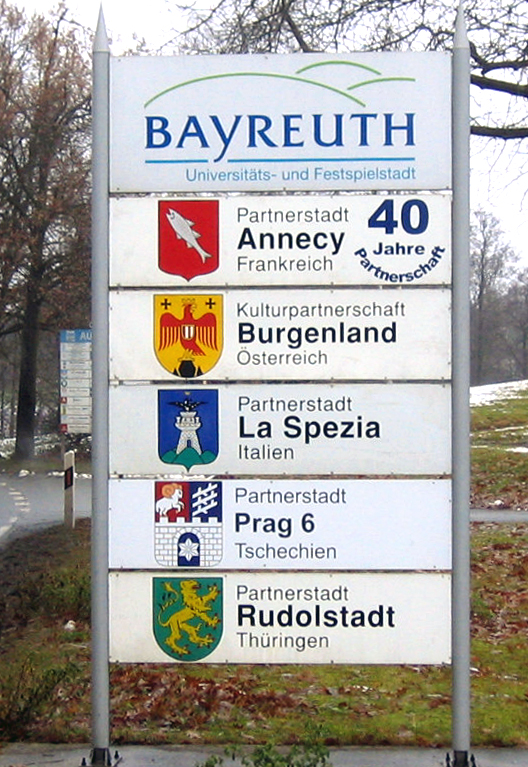
Bayreuth's twin towns

Bayreuth is twinned with:

- Annecy, France (1966)
- Rudolstadt, Germany (1990)
- La Spezia, Italy (1999)
- Prague 6, Czech Republic (2008)
- Tekirdağ, Turkey (2012)

Since 1990, there is also a cultural partnership with the state of Burgenland, Austria, and a university partnership between the University of Bayreuth and the Washington and Lee University in Lexington, Virginia.

== Notable people ==
=== 1600–1700 ===
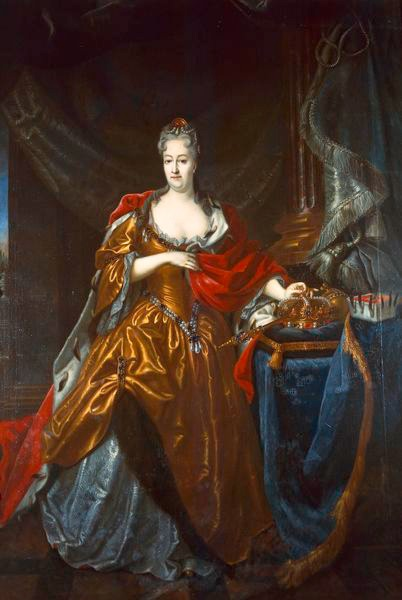
Christiane Eberhardine of Brandenburg-Bayreuth

- Anna Maria von Eggenberg, née Brandenburg-Bayreuth (1609–1680), Princess of Brandenburg-Bayreuth
- Erdmann August of Brandenburg-Bayreuth (1615–1651), Prince of Brandenburg-Bayreuth
- Georg Albrecht, Margrave of Brandenburg-Bayreuth-Kulmbach (1619–1666), founder of the Kulmbach subline
- Christian Ernst, Margrave of Brandenburg-Bayreuth (1644–1712), Margrave of the Frankish Principality of Bayreuth
- Christian Heinrich, Margrave of Brandenburg-Bayreuth-Kulmbach, (1661–1708), nobleman
- Christiane Eberhardine of Brandenburg-Bayreuth (1671–1727), Electress of Saxony
- George William, Margrave of Brandenburg-Bayreuth (1678–1726), Margrave of the Frankish Principality of Bayreuth

=== 1701–1800 ===
- Princess Wilhelmine of Bayreuth (1709–1758), monarch
- Casimir Christoph Schmidel (1718–1791), physician and botanist
- Johann David Schoepf (1752–1800), surgeon, botanist, zoologist and naturalist
- Anna Heinel (1753–1808), dancer
- Johann Christian Ritter (1755–1810), first printer in South Africa
- Johann Georg Wunderlich (1755–1819), flutist, university teacher and composer

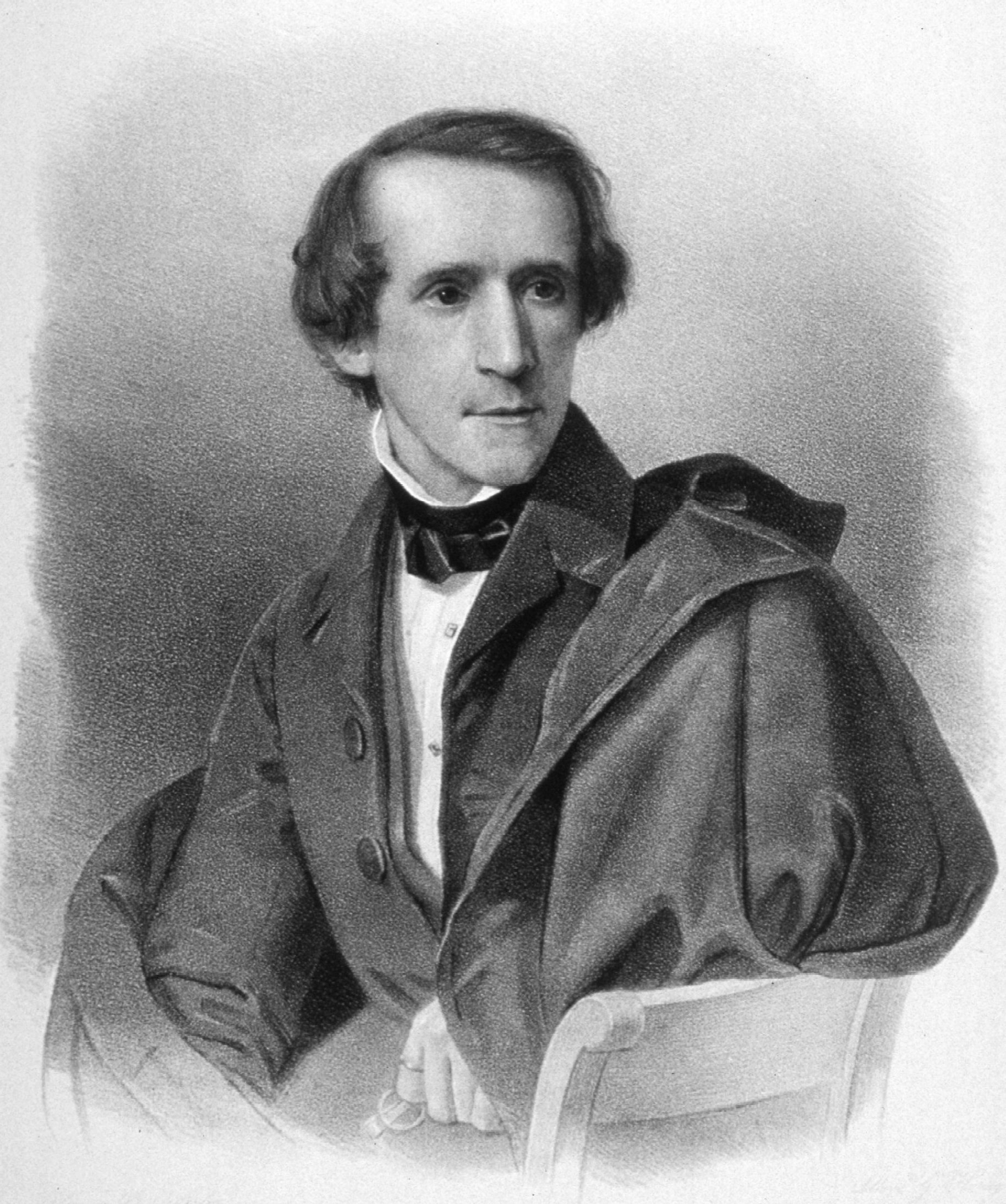
Rudolf Wagner

- Ludwig Abeille (1761–1838), pianist and composer
- Jean Paul (1763–1825), German romantic writer
- Ludwig Förster (1797–1863), Austrian-German architect
- Heinrich von Gagern (1799–1880), politician, first president of the Frankfurt National Assembly on 19 May 1848
- August Riedel (1799–1883), painter

=== 1801–1900 ===
- Rudolf Wagner (1805–1864), anatomist and physiologist
- Max Stirner (1806–1856), philosopher and journalist
- Franz Liszt (1811–1886), Hungarian composer
- Eduard Riedel (1813–1885), architect
- Moritz Wagner (1813–1887), traveler, geographer and naturalist
- Richard Wagner (1813–1883), composer
- Wilhelm von Diez (1839–1907), painter and illustrator
- Oskar Panizza (1853–1921), psychiatrist, dissident author
- Franz Muncker (1855–1926), literary historian
- Theodor von der Pfordten (1873–1923), High Court Judge at the Bavarian Supreme Court and participant killed in the Beer Hall Putsch
- Fritz Neuland (1889–1969), lawyer
- Wilhelm Leuschner (1890–1944), trade unionist and politician (SPD)
- Fritz Rasp (1891–1976), film and stage actor
- Hans Schemm (1891–1935), teacher, politician and Gauleiter (NSDAP)
- Robert Ritter von Greim (1892–1945), Army and Air Force officer, 1945 Field Marshal

=== 1901–1950 ===
- Ludwig Kirschner (1904–1945), German officer, Major-General last in World War II
- Ludwig Ruckdeschel (1907–1968), politician (NSDAP) and Gauleiter
- Eberhard Wagner (born 1938), German linguist and author
- Wieland Wagner (1917–1966), opera director and designer
- Friedelind Wagner (1918–1991), eldest daughter of Siegfried Wagner
- Wolfgang Wagner (1919–2010), opera director and designer
- Max von der Grün (1926–2005), writer
- Walter Demel (1935–2023), cross country skier
- Udo Steiner (born 1939), Judge of the Constitutional Court
- Gottfried Wagner (born 1947), opera director, multimedia director and publicist

=== From 1951 ===
- Horst Knörrer (born 1953), mathematician
- Asha Noppeney (born 1954), athlete
- Klaus Schilling (born 1956), Professor of Robotics and Telematics
- Gudrun Brendel-Fischer (born 1959), politician (CSU)
- Stefan Rauh (born 1963), musician, composer and music publisher
- Saskia Marka (born 1975), German film title designer
- Martin Schöffel (born 1979), politician (CSU)
- Katharina Wagner (born 1978), opera director
- Maya Karin (born 1979), Malaysian actress, television personality, and singer
- Thomas Reiser (born 1979), philologist and translator
- Anne Haug (born 1983), triathlete
- Florian Mayer (born 1983), tennis player
- Philipp Petzschner (born 1984), tennis player

== Gallery ==
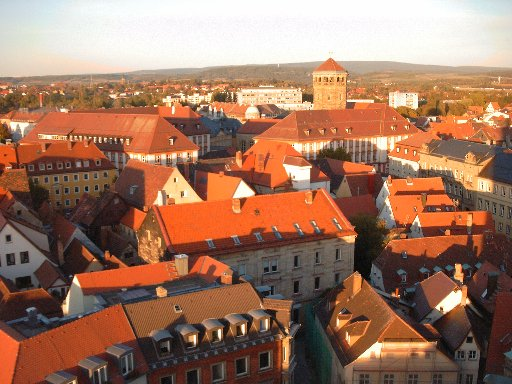
View of Bayreuth from the Stadtkirche

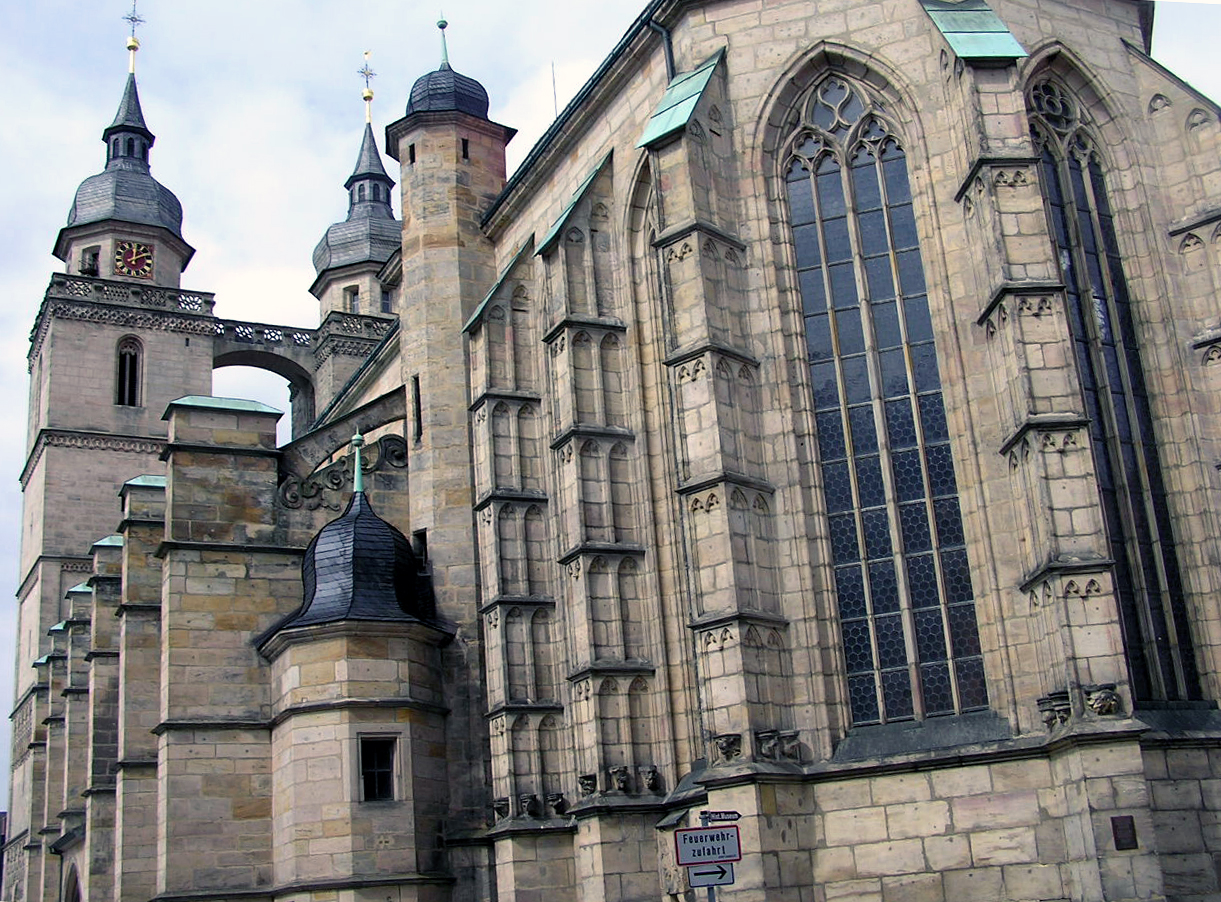
The Stadtkirche

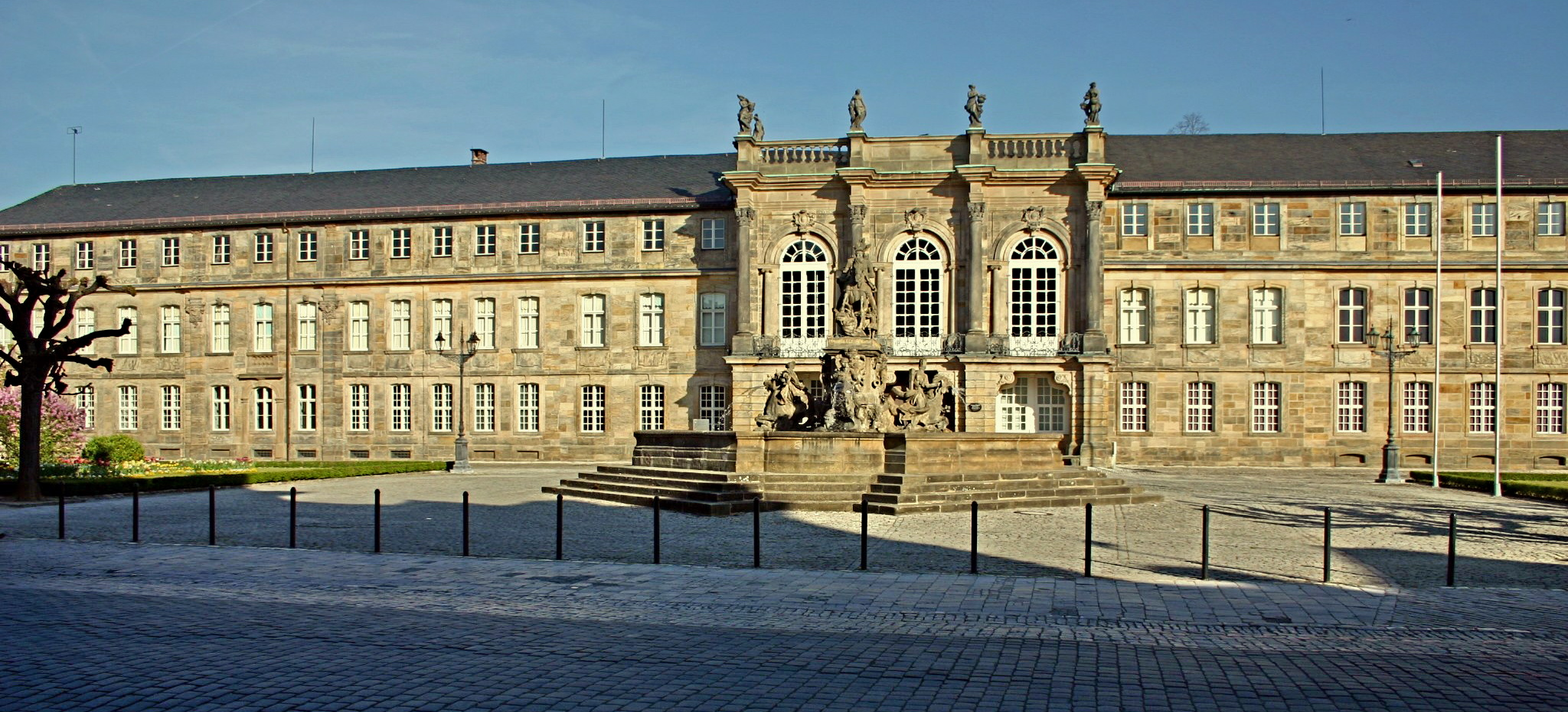
The New Palace

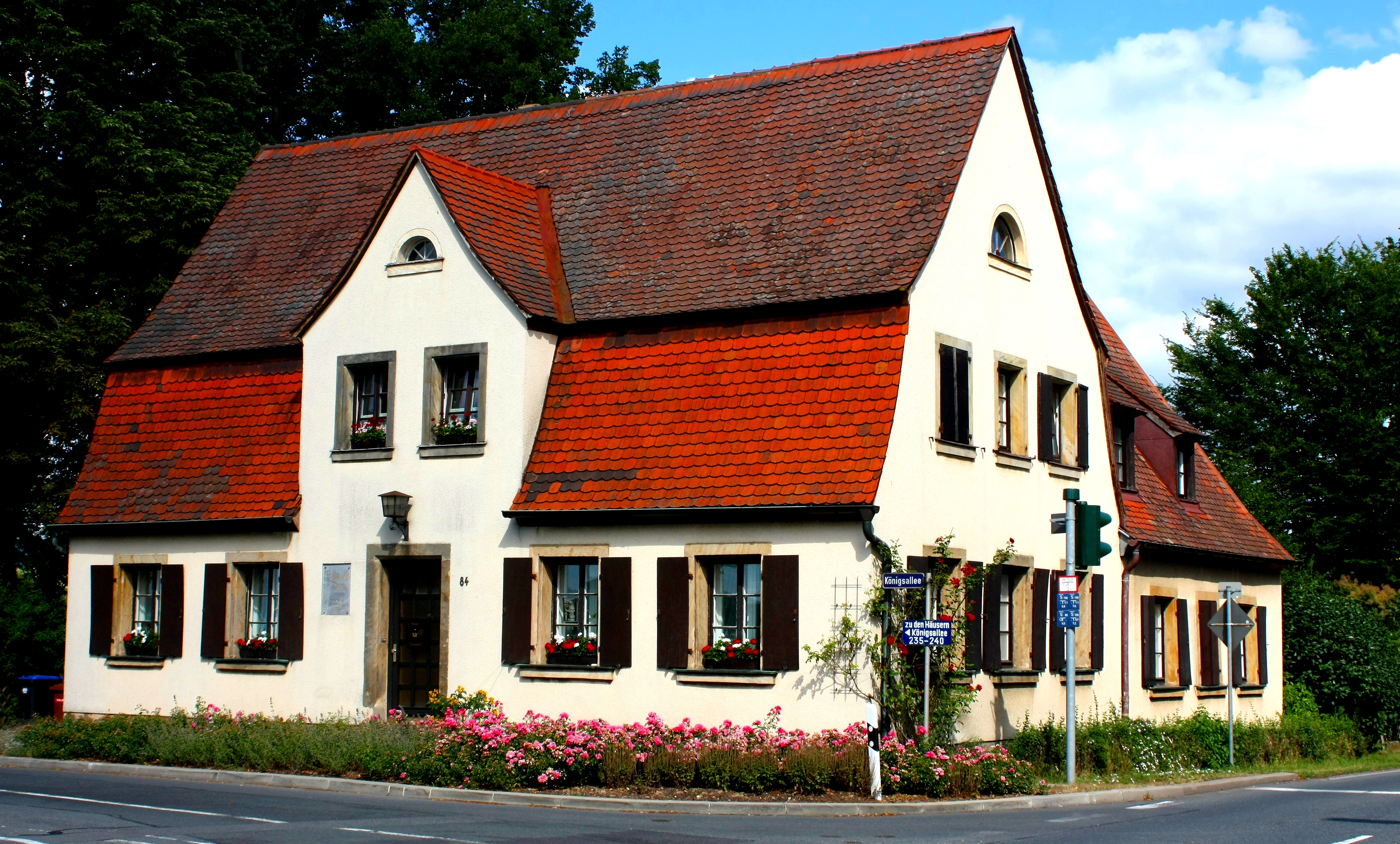
Rollwenzelei with Jean Paul's study (Dichterstube)

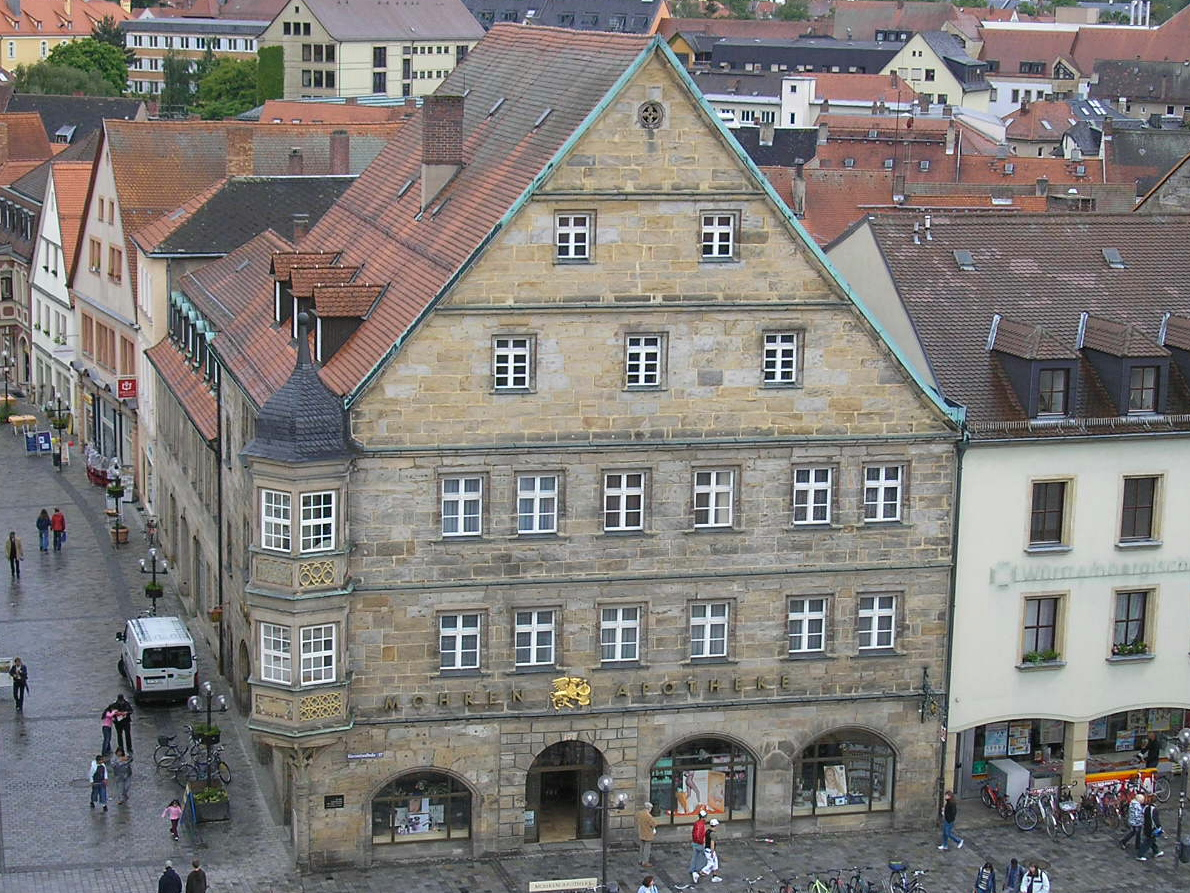
The Mohren Apothecary on the town square

== See also ==
- Bayreuth coffee maker manufactured by Walküre Porzellan
