= Kunstmuseum Bayreuth =

Coordinates: 49.9440°N 11.5747°E

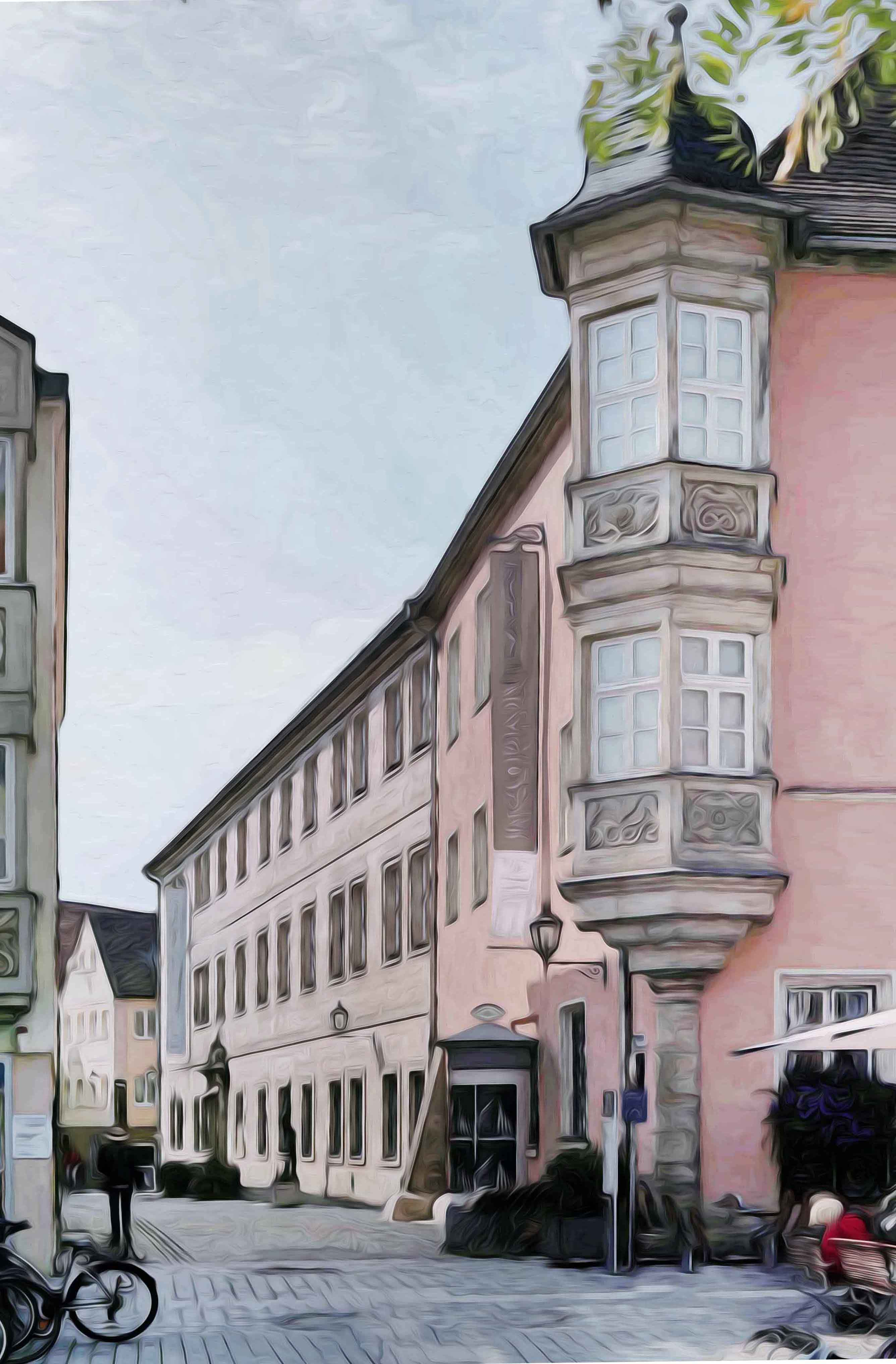
- Kunstmuseum Bayreuth, Entrance in the Brautgasse
- Established: 1999
- Location: Maximilianstraße 33; 95444 Bayreuth, Germany
- Type: Art museum, Historic site
- Website: http://www.kunstmuseum-bayreuth.de

The Kunstmuseum Bayreuth is a museum for modern art, opened in 1999 in Bayreuth, Bavaria, Germany. The historic rooms of the baroque former town hall present exhibitions with contemporary art and classical modern art. The offer includes guided tours, educational events and lectures.

== History ==
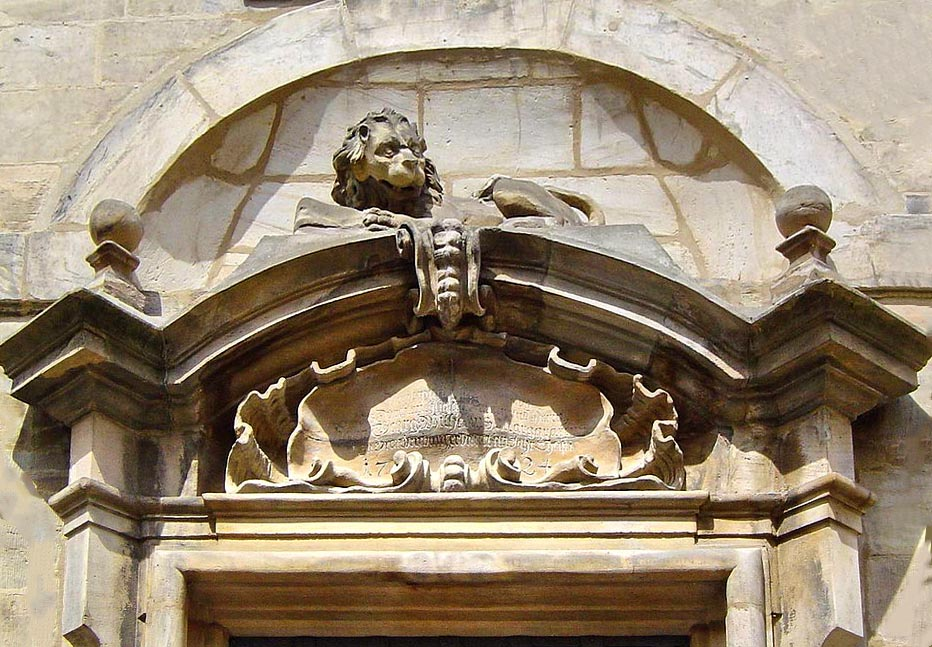
Entrance Kunstmuseum Bayreuth Margrave's lion above the portal in the Brautgasse

The beginnings of the building date to the Middle Ages. After destruction as a result of the Hussite Wars in the year 1430 and the large fires in 1605 and 1621, the building was transformed into the town hall of Bayreuth in 1721 and served in that function until 1916. Under the auspices of the margrave's architect Johann David Räntz, the building was transformed from 1722 to 1727. From 1797 to 1812 the old town hall was the seat of the municipal court, and the district court convened here from 1816 to 1832. Until 1916 public amenities such as a trade school or the municipal post office found accommodation. With the inauguration of the new town hall on the Luitpoldplatz in 1916, the building lost this function.

In the Weimar Republic, the baroque town hall housed the municipal library from 1921 to 1928. After the destruction of the new town hall during World War II the old town hall was used as town hall again from 1945. With the construction of the modern town hall, opened in 1972, the building served as state police department.

After Mayor Dieter Mronz won the foundation Dr. Helmut and Constanze Meyer Kunststiftung for Bayreuth, the building was chosen as the seat for the Kunstmuseum Bayreuth, opened in December 1999.
