= Margrave Fountain (Bayreuth) =

Monument in Bayreuth, Bavaria

Coordinates: 49°56′32″N 11°34′37″E

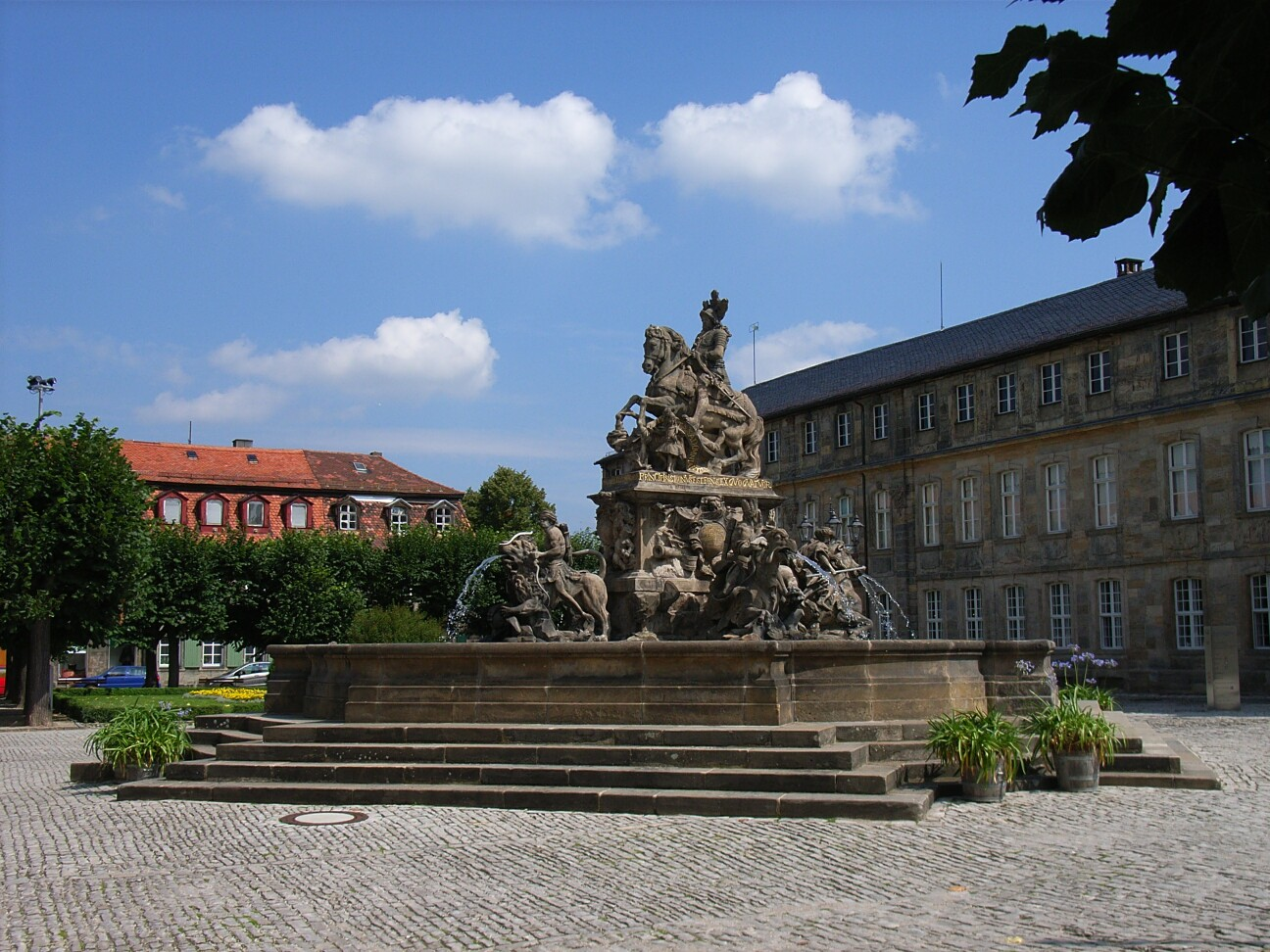
Fountain from a Distance

The Margrave Fountain (German: Markgrafenbrunnen) is a fountain in Bayreuth, Germany. It was built as a monument for Margrave Christian Ernest of Brandenburg-Bayreuth after he had participated in the liberation of Vienna, which had been besieged by the Turks in 1683. The Margrave's equestrian statue is placed in the centre of the fountain, surrounded by other sculpture groups representing the four known continents as well as four rivers rising in the Fichtel Mountains.

The fountain was designed by German sculptor Elias Räntz in 1699 to 1705 by order of Margrave Christian Ernest. It was placed in the outer courtyard of the Old Castle, today it stands in front of the New Castle (Neues Schloss).

== The equestrian statue ==
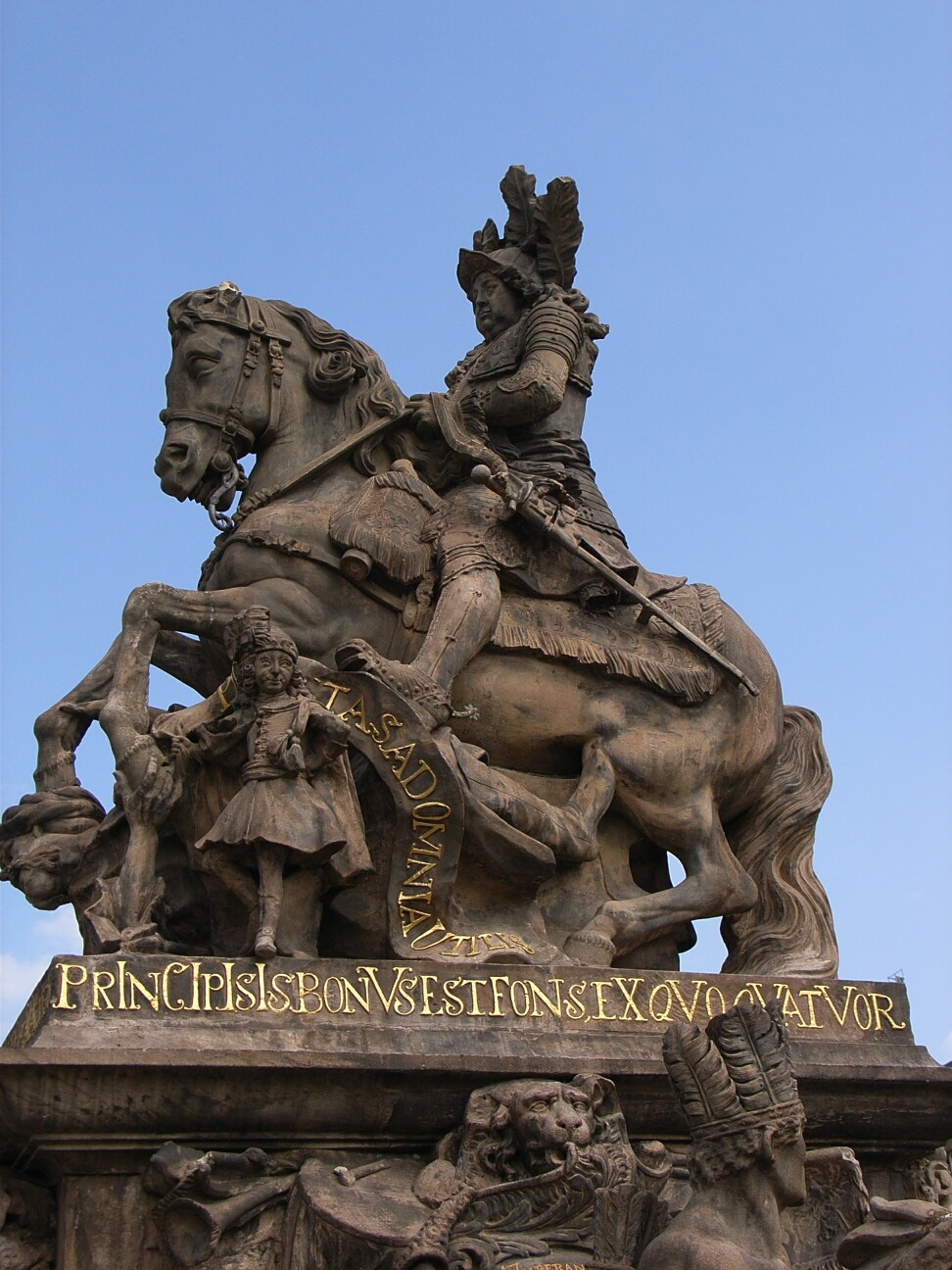
Closeup of Equestrian Statue

Sitting on his horse, Margrave Christian Ernest is depicted wearing an armour. Beneath his horse, an anguished Turk is lying on the ground. On the other side, the Margrave's court dwarf is holding a shield with the inscription "PIETAS AD OMNIA UTILIS" (piety is useful for everything). Originally, both the Margrave's and the dwarf's statue were gilded.

== The banner ==
The statue is surrounded by a banner. The inscription "IPSO SERENISS NATAL D. 27. IV L. AN. AET. 56" forebodes that the fountain had been completed by the Margrave's 56th birthday. Presumably, only the statue was finished by this point. The inscription continues: "PRINCIPIS IS BONVS EST FONS, EX QVO QVATVOR AQVAE ORBIS AD PARTES MOENVS, NABA, SALA, EGRA RVVNT" (this is the felicitous princely fountain, out of which the rivers Main, Naab, Saale, Eger flow towards the four cardinal directions).

The text is written as a chronogram: the bold letters are written larger on the banner than the others. If you read them as Roman numerals and sum them up, the result is 1705, the year the fountain has been completed.

== The other sculpture groups ==
The lower part of the fountain is made up of four sculpture groups, each consisting of a person sitting on a spouting animal. The water flows represent the four rivers rising in the Fichtel Mountains, whose directions of flow match the four cardinal directions. The four sculpture groups also represent the four continents (Europe, Asia, Africa, America). The Native American is sitting on a griffin, as the wildlife of the Americas wasn't known in Europe in the 1700s.

Sculpture group	River	Continent	Cardinal direction
Man of colour on a lion	Naba (Naab)	Africa	South
Native American on a griffin	Moenus (Main)	America	West
Turk on a horse	Egra (Eger)	Asia	East
Europa (dressed as lady-in-waiting) on a bull	Sala (Saale)	Europe	North
