= Bayreuth (electoral district) =

Federal electoral district of Germany

236 Bayreuth
- Electoral district for the Bundestag
- Bayreuth in 2025
- State: Bavaria
- Population: 206,600 (2019)
- Electorate: 158,660 (2025)
- Major settlements: Bayreuth; Pegnitz; Pottenstein
- Area: 1,648.0 km^{2}

Current electoral district
- Created: 1949
- Party: CSU
- Member: Silke Launert
- Elected: 2017, 2021, 2025

Bayreuth is an electoral constituency (German: Wahlkreis) represented in the Bundestag. It elects one member via first-past-the-post voting. Under the current constituency numbering system, it is designated as constituency 236. It is located in northern Bavaria, comprising the city of Bayreuth, the Landkreis Bayreuth district, and the eastern part of the Forchheim district.

Bayreuth was created for the inaugural 1949 federal election. Since 2017, it has been represented by Silke Launert of the Christian Social Union (CSU).

== Geography ==
Bayreuth is located in northern Bavaria. As of the 2021 federal election, it comprises the independent city of Bayreuth, the Landkreis Bayreuth district, and the municipalities of Egloffstein, Gößweinstein, Obertrubach, Pretzfeld, and Wiesenttal and Verwaltungsgemeinschaften of Ebermannstadt and Gräfenberg from the Forchheim district.

== History ==
Bayreuth was created in 1949. In the 1949 election, it was Bavaria constituency 25 in the numbering system. In the 1953 through 1961 elections, it was number 220. In the 1965 through 1998 elections, it was number 223. In the 2002 and 2005 elections, it was number 238. In the 2009 through 2021 elections, it was number 237. From the 2025 election, it has been number 236.

Originally, the constituency comprised the independent cities of Bayreuth and Marktredwitz and the districts of Landkreis Bayreuth and Wunsiedel. In the 1965 through 1972 elections, it also contained the Pegnitz district. In the 1976 through 1998 elections, it comprised the city of Bayreuth and Landkreis Bayreuth district. It acquired its current borders in the 2002 election.

Election	No.	Name	Borders
1949	25	Bayreuth	Bayreuth city; Marktredwitz city; Landkreis Bayreuth district; Wunsiedel district
1953	220	Bayreuth	Bayreuth city; Marktredwitz city; Landkreis Bayreuth district; Wunsiedel district
1957	220	Bayreuth	Bayreuth city; Marktredwitz city; Landkreis Bayreuth district; Wunsiedel district
1961	220	Bayreuth	Bayreuth city; Marktredwitz city; Landkreis Bayreuth district; Wunsiedel district
1965	223	Bayreuth	Bayreuth city; Marktredwitz city; Landkreis Bayreuth district; Wunsiedel district; Pegnitz district
1969	223	Bayreuth	Bayreuth city; Marktredwitz city; Landkreis Bayreuth district; Wunsiedel district; Pegnitz district
1972	223	Bayreuth	Bayreuth city; Marktredwitz city; Landkreis Bayreuth district; Wunsiedel district; Pegnitz district
1976	223	Bayreuth	Bayreuth city; Landkreis Bayreuth district
1980	223	Bayreuth	Bayreuth city; Landkreis Bayreuth district
1983	223	Bayreuth	Bayreuth city; Landkreis Bayreuth district
1987	223	Bayreuth	Bayreuth city; Landkreis Bayreuth district
1990	223	Bayreuth	Bayreuth city; Landkreis Bayreuth district
1994	223	Bayreuth	Bayreuth city; Landkreis Bayreuth district
1998	223	Bayreuth	Bayreuth city; Landkreis Bayreuth district
2002	238	Bayreuth	Bayreuth city; Landkreis Bayreuth district; Forchheim district (only Egloffstein, Gößweinstein, Obertrubach, Pretzfeld, and Wiesenttal municipalities and Ebermannstadt and Gräfenberg Verwaltungsgemeinschaften)
2005	238	Bayreuth	Bayreuth city; Landkreis Bayreuth district; Forchheim district (only Egloffstein, Gößweinstein, Obertrubach, Pretzfeld, and Wiesenttal municipalities and Ebermannstadt and Gräfenberg Verwaltungsgemeinschaften)
2009	237	Bayreuth	Bayreuth city; Landkreis Bayreuth district; Forchheim district (only Egloffstein, Gößweinstein, Obertrubach, Pretzfeld, and Wiesenttal municipalities and Ebermannstadt and Gräfenberg Verwaltungsgemeinschaften)
2013	237	Bayreuth	Bayreuth city; Landkreis Bayreuth district; Forchheim district (only Egloffstein, Gößweinstein, Obertrubach, Pretzfeld, and Wiesenttal municipalities and Ebermannstadt and Gräfenberg Verwaltungsgemeinschaften)
2017	237	Bayreuth	Bayreuth city; Landkreis Bayreuth district; Forchheim district (only Egloffstein, Gößweinstein, Obertrubach, Pretzfeld, and Wiesenttal municipalities and Ebermannstadt and Gräfenberg Verwaltungsgemeinschaften)
2021	237	Bayreuth	Bayreuth city; Landkreis Bayreuth district; Forchheim district (only Egloffstein, Gößweinstein, Obertrubach, Pretzfeld, and Wiesenttal municipalities and Ebermannstadt and Gräfenberg Verwaltungsgemeinschaften)
2025	236	Bayreuth	Bayreuth city; Landkreis Bayreuth district; Forchheim district (only Egloffstein, Gößweinstein, Obertrubach, Pretzfeld, and Wiesenttal municipalities and Ebermannstadt and Gräfenberg Verwaltungsgemeinschaften)

== Members ==
The constituency was first represented by Matthäus Herrmann of the Social Democratic Party (SPD) from 1949 to 1953, followed by fellow SPD member Herbert Hauffe from 1953 to 1957. Albrecht Schlee of the Christian Social Union (CSU) won it in 1957, but former member Hauffe regained it for the SPD in 1961. Former member Schlee was then elected in 1965 and 1969. Richard Müller of the SPD was elected in 1972 and served a single term. Heinz Starke of the CSU was representative from 1976 to 1980, followed by Ortwin Lowack from 1980 to 1994. Hartmut Koschyk of the CSU then served from 1994 to 2017. Silke Launert of the CSU was elected in 2017 and re-elected in 2021 and 2025.

Election	Member	Party	%
1949	Matthäus Herrmann	SPD	39.7
1953	Herbert Hauffe	SPD	40.0
1957	Albrecht Schlee	CSU	43.7
1961	Herbert Hauffe	SPD	43.1
1965	Albrecht Schlee	CSU	48.0
1969	Albrecht Schlee	CSU	46.4
1972	Richard Müller	SPD	48.6
1976	Heinz Starke	CSU	55.1
1980	Ortwin Lowack	CSU	55.6
1983	Ortwin Lowack	CSU	61.6
1987	Ortwin Lowack	CSU	57.3
1990	Ortwin Lowack	CSU	54.9
1994	Hartmut Koschyk	CSU	46.0
1998	Hartmut Koschyk	CSU	50.6
2002	Hartmut Koschyk	CSU	60.7
2005	Hartmut Koschyk	CSU	56.1
2009	Hartmut Koschyk	CSU	50.9
2013	Hartmut Koschyk	CSU	55.9
2017	Silke Launert	CSU	46.5
2021	Silke Launert	CSU	42.4
2025	Silke Launert	CSU	44.5

== Election results ==
=== 2025 election ===
Federal election (2025): Bayreuth
Notes:	Blue background denotes the winner of the electorate vote. Pink background denotes a candidate elected from their party list. Yellow background denotes an electorate win by a list member, or other incumbent. A ✓ or ✗ denotes status of any incumbent, win or lose respectively.						
Party	Candidate	Votes	%	±%	Party votes	%	±%
CSU	Silke Launert	59,366	44.5	▲2.0	51,467	38.5	▲4.4
AfD	Tobias Matthias Peterka	25,068	18.8	▲10.4	26,682	20.0	▲10.9
SPD	Anette Kramme	19,068	14.3	▼5.1	16,404	12.3	▼8.4
Greens	Inken Bößert	11,000	8.2	▼2.7	13,155	9.8	▼2.3
FW	Thomas Robert Schmid	6,741	5.1	▼1.0	5,969	4.5	▼2.4
Left	Jannick Metz	6,113	4.6	▲2.6	7,605	5.7	▲3.1
FDP	Thomas Hacker	3,728	2.8	▼4.4	4,987	3.7	▼5.6
BSW					3,973	3.0	
APT					1,043	0.8	▼0.2
Volt	Maximilian Markus Peter Diepold	1,398	1.0		845	0.6	▲0.4
dieBasis	Erich Vornberger	984	0.7	▼0.8	473	0.4	▼0.9
PARTEI					441	0.3	▼0.4
ÖDP					314	0.2	▼0.2
BP					112	0.1	▼0.1
Humanists					95	0.1	Steady
BD					94	0.1	
MLPD					22	0.0	Steady
Informal votes		614			399		
Total valid votes		133,466			133,681		
Turnout		134,080	84.5	▲5.0			
CSU hold	Majority	34,298	25.7	▲2.7			

=== 2021 election ===
Federal election (2021): Bayreuth
Notes:	Blue background denotes the winner of the electorate vote. Pink background denotes a candidate elected from their party list. Yellow background denotes an electorate win by a list member, or other incumbent. A ✓ or ✗ denotes status of any incumbent, win or lose respectively.						
Party	Candidate	Votes	%	±%	Party votes	%	±%
CSU	✓ Silke Launert	54,465	42.4	▼4.1	43,768	34.1	▼7.9
SPD	Anette Kramme	24,840	19.4	▼1.9	26,584	20.7	▲2.3
Greens	Susanne Bauer	14,064	11.0	▲3.9	15,647	12.2	▲4.3
AfD	Tobias Peterka	10,777	8.4	▼1.0	11,636	9.1	▼1.7
FDP	Thomas Hacker	9,182	7.2	▲0.5	12,020	9.4	▲0.4
FW	Corey Dressendörfer	7,754	6.0	▲2.5	8,857	6.9	▲4.2
Left	Sven Schröder	2,577	2.0	▼2.3	3,294	2.6	▼3.0
dieBasis	Markus Engel	2,028	1.6		1,642	1.3	
Tierschutzpartei					1,306	1.0	▲0.2
PARTEI	Florens Weiß	1,709	1.3	0.0	988	0.8	▼0.2
ÖDP	Dominic Hopp	934	0.7		516	0.4	0.0
Pirates					368	0.3	0.0
Volt					321	0.3	
BP					269	0.2	▼0.1
Team Todenhöfer					241	0.2	
Unabhängige					210	0.2	
Gesundheitsforschung					166	0.1	0.0
Bündnis C					142	0.1	
Humanists					131	0.1	
V-Partei3					120	0.1	▼0.2
NPD					101	0.1	▼0.2
The III. Path					82	0.1	
du.					71	0.1	
LKR					19	0.0	
DKP					18	0.0	0.0
MLPD					13	0.0	0.0
Informal votes		806			606		
Total valid votes		128,330			128,530		
Turnout		129,136	79.5	▲1.9			
CSU hold	Majority	29,625	23.0	▼2.2			

=== 2017 election ===
Federal election (2017): Bayreuth
Notes:	Blue background denotes the winner of the electorate vote. Pink background denotes a candidate elected from their party list. Yellow background denotes an electorate win by a list member, or other incumbent. A ✓ or ✗ denotes status of any incumbent, win or lose respectively.						
Party	Candidate	Votes	%	±%	Party votes	%	±%
CSU	Silke Launert	58,665	46.5	▼9.4	53,063	41.9	▼7.6
SPD	Anette Kramme	26,785	21.2	▼4.4	23,198	18.3	▼4.9
AfD	Tobias Peterka	11,845	9.4	▲6.3	13,566	10.7	▼6.9
Greens	Susanne Bauer	8,936	7.1	▲0.8	9,994	7.9	▲1.1
FDP	Thomas Hacker	8,368	6.6	▲3.9	11,369	9.0	▲4.2
Left	Sebastian Sommerer	5,476	4.3	▲1.5	7,022	5.5	▲2.3
FW	Thomas Mainusch	4,434	3.5		3,441	2.7	▼0.4
PARTEI	Wolfgang Karl	1,662	1.3		1,194	0.9	
Tierschutzpartei					1,015	0.8	▲0.1
ÖDP					532	0.4	▼0.1
NPD					386	0.3	▼0.7
Pirates					373	0.3	▼1.6
BP					347	0.3	▼0.1
V-Partei³					318	0.3	
Gesundheitsforschung					189	0.1	
DM					177	0.1	
DiB					156	0.1	
BGE					138	0.1	
MLPD					24	0.0	0.0
DKP					15	0.0	
BüSo					12	0.0	0.0
Informal votes		1,051			693		
Total valid votes		126,171			126,529		
Turnout		127,222	77.6	▲7.4			
CSU hold	Majority	31,880	25.3	▼5.0			

=== 2013 election ===
Federal election (2013): Bayreuth
Notes:	Blue background denotes the winner of the electorate vote. Pink background denotes a candidate elected from their party list. Yellow background denotes an electorate win by a list member, or other incumbent. A ✓ or ✗ denotes status of any incumbent, win or lose respectively.						
Party	Candidate	Votes	%	±%	Party votes	%	±%
CSU	✓ Hartmut Koschyk	63,936	55.9	▲5.0	56,846	49.5	▲5.6
SPD	Anette Kramme	29,344	25.6	▲4.9	26,676	23.2	▲4.3
Greens	Sabine Steininger	7,189	6.3	▼5.0	7,803	6.8	▼2.6
AfD	Tobias Matthias Peterka	3,569	3.1		4,435	3.9	
Left	Tilmann Schiel	3,246	2.8	▼2.6	3,783	3.3	▼2.6
FDP	Hermann Hiery	3,133	2.7	▼5.8	5,539	4.8	▼9.0
FW					3,524	3.1	
Pirates	Dirk-Gernot Marky	2,663	2.3		2,192	1.9	▼0.2
NPD	Harald Bestehorn	1,392	1.2	▼0.3	1,104	1.0	▼0.4
Tierschutzpartei					796	0.7	▲0.1
ÖDP					556	0.5	0.0
REP					530	0.5	▼0.8
BP					398	0.3	0.0
DIE FRAUEN					245	0.2	
DIE VIOLETTEN					112	0.1	▼0.1
Party of Reason					111	0.1	
PRO					70	0.1	
RRP					44	0.0	▼0.5
MLPD					24	0.0	0.0
BüSo					16	0.0	▼0.1
Informal votes		1,187			855		
Total valid votes		114,472			114,804		
Turnout		115,659	70.2	▼1.2			
CSU hold	Majority	34,592	30.3	▲0.1			

=== 2009 election ===
Federal election (2009): Bayreuth
Notes:	Blue background denotes the winner of the electorate vote. Pink background denotes a candidate elected from their party list. Yellow background denotes an electorate win by a list member, or other incumbent. A ✓ or ✗ denotes status of any incumbent, win or lose respectively.						
Party	Candidate	Votes	%	±%	Party votes	%	±%
CSU	✓ Hartmut Koschyk	58,848	50.9	▼5.2	51,124	44.0	▼4.1
SPD	Anette Kramme	23,920	20.7	▼8.1	22,018	18.9	▼9.5
Greens	Gert Lowack	13,096	11.3	▲7.1	10,937	9.4	▲3.3
FDP	Philipp Irmscher	9,898	8.6	▲3.3	16,066	13.8	▲4.7
Left	Georg Böhner	6,318	5.5	▲2.5	6,865	5.9	▲2.5
Pirates					2,401	2.1	
REP	Franz Noffke	1,855	1.6		1,520	1.3	▼0.3
NPD	Kai Limmer	1,701	1.5	▼0.4	1,593	1.4	0.0
FAMILIE					818	0.7	▲0.2
Tierschutzpartei					690	0.6	
ÖDP					595	0.5	
RRP					570	0.5	
BP					414	0.4	▲0.2
PBC					293	0.3	▼0.2
DIE VIOLETTEN					181	0.2	
CM					131	0.1	
DVU					50	0.0	
BüSo					30	0.0	0.0
MLPD					20	0.0	0.0
Informal votes		1,654			974		
Total valid votes		115,636			116,316		
Turnout		117,290	71.4	▼6.2			
CSU hold	Majority	34,928	30.2	▲2.9			

=== 2005 election ===
Federal election (2005):Bayreuth
Notes:	Blue background denotes the winner of the electorate vote. Pink background denotes a candidate elected from their party list. Yellow background denotes an electorate win by a list member, or other incumbent. A ✓ or ✗ denotes status of any incumbent, win or lose respectively.						
Party	Candidate	Votes	%	±%	Party votes	%	±%
CSU	✓ Hartmut Koschyk	70,928	56.1	▼4.7	61,086	48.1	▼10.2
SPD	Anette Kramme	36,352	28.7	▼0.4	36,118	28.4	▼0.1
FDP	Horst Friedrich	6,703	5.3	▲1.2	11,557	9.1	▲4.7
Greens	Tobias Fabian-Krause	5,396	4.3	▲0.4	7,802	6.1	▲0.3
Left	Christa Meist	3,808	3.0	▲2.2	4,355	3.4	▲2.9
NPD	KaI Limmer	2,421	1.9		1,802	1.4	▲1.2
REP					2,084	1.6	▲0.8
PBC	Gerhard Schurig	881	0.7		531	0.4	▲0.2
Familie					658	0.5	
GRAUEN					350	0.3	▲0.2
Feminist					314	0.2	▲0.1
BP					257	0.2	▲0.1
BüSo					45	0.0	0.0
MLPD					43	0.0	
Informal votes		1,909			1,396		
Total valid votes		126,489			127,002		
Turnout		128,398	77.6	▼3.6			
CSU hold	Majority	34,576	27.4				
