= Oecologia =

Peer-reviewed scientific journal

- Discipline: Ecology
- Language: English

Publication details
- Publisher: Springer (Germany)
- Frequency: 16/year
- Impact factor: 3.298 (2021)

Standard abbreviations
- ISO 4: Oecologia

Indexing
- ISSN: 0029-8549 (print); 1432-1939 (web)

Links
- Journal homepage

Oecologia is an international peer-reviewed English-language journal published by Springer since 1968 (some articles were published in German or French until 1976). The journal publishes original research in a range of topics related to plant and animal ecology.

Oecologia has an international focus and presents original papers, methods, reviews and special topics. Papers focus on population ecology, plant-animal interactions, ecosystem ecology, community ecology, global change ecology, conservation ecology, behavioral ecology and physiological ecology.

Oecologia had an impact factor of 3.298 (2021) and is ranked 37 out of 136 in the subject category "ecology".

== Editorial Board ==
As of December 2022, the journal has six editors in chief:

- Carlos L. Ballaré (plant-microbe/plant-animal interactions), University of Buenos Aires, Argentina
- Nina Farwig (terrestrial invertebrate ecology), University of Marburg, Germany
- Indrikis Krams (terrestrial vertebrate ecology), University of Latvia, Latvia
- Russell K. Monson (plant physiological/ecosystem ecology), University of Colorado Boulder, US
- Melinda Smith (plant population/community ecology), Colorado State University, US
- Joel Trexler (aquatic ecology), Florida State University, US
