= Martha Kazungu =

Ugandan curator, historian and writer

- Born: 1993 (age 32–33); Uganda
- Education: University of Bayreuth
- Occupations: Curator, writer, cultural consultant
- Known for: Founding director of Njabala Foundation

Martha Kazungu (born 1993) is a Ugandan curator, writer, and cultural activist. She is the founding director of the Njabala Foundation, an organization dedicated to supporting women artists through exhibitions, mentorship, research, and community engagement. Kazungu is known for her curatorial work focusing on contemporary African art, feminist artistic practice, and cultural heritage preservation.

== Early life and education ==
Kazungu was born in Uganda in 1993. She studied African visual and verbal art at the University of Bayreuth in Germany, where she obtained a master of arts degree focusing on curating and media in Africa.

Her academic research explored graphic art styles connected to collections at the Makerere University Art Gallery and the World Culture Museum in Frankfurt.

Kazungu also participated in several international professional development programmes including TheMuseumsLab, Independent Curators International, the Àsìkò School, and the AtWork programme.

== Career ==
=== Curatorial work ===
Kazungu works between Kampala and Nairobi and has curated exhibitions and art programmes across Africa and Europe. Her work frequently explores themes of identity, gender representation, social transformation, and cultural memory.

Her curatorial projects include:

- My Mother Is Forgetting My Face (Norway)
- Life Classes: Ugandan Art on Paper (Germany)
- Embodiment of Reason (Uganda)
- Here and Here (Ethiopia)
- Njabala: This Is Not How (Uganda)

Kazungu served as assistant curator of the Kampala Art Biennale in 2016, working with curator Elise Atangana. She also worked as curatorial assistant on Feedback: Art Africa and the 1980s at Iwalewahaus. In 2019, Kanzung was part of the Independent Curators International held in Cape Town.

In 2020, she curated exhibitions exploring the relationship between fashion, craft, and social sustainability in Uganda.

=== Institutional roles ===
Kazungu served as assistant curator at Museum am Rothenbaum (MARKK) in Hamburg, where she co-curated Archive of Experiences, which was part of the 8th Triennial of Photography Hamburg. She was also co-curator for the German Federal Cultural Foundation’s TURN2 Labs, which facilitated cultural exchange programmes between African and European art practitioners. Kazungu has served on advisory boards and jury panels including the Henrike Grohs Art Award and exhibitions at Kunstmuseum Wolfsburg.

== Njabala Foundation ==
Kazungu founded the Njabala Foundation, a nonprofit organization that promotes the visibility of women artists through exhibitions, research initiatives, residencies, and mentorship programmes. With the foundation, Kazungu conducts historical research projects documenting African women artists, including research focusing on East African women artists from the 1960s. The organization was established partly to address gender inequality within Uganda’s contemporary art sector.

== Writing ==
Kazungu has contributed to several international art publications and exhibition catalogs. Her writing has appeared in books including:

- African Artists: From 1882 to Now
- Great Women Painters
- Embodying Social Being, a monograph on sculptor Lilian Nabulime

She has also contributed essays and research texts exploring African art history and feminist artistic practice.

== Research and public engagement ==
Kazungu coordinated the symposium Art History Re-written: Contributing to the History of Post-colonial Modernism at the Uganda National Museum. Her work often emphasizes interdisciplinary collaboration and public participation in contemporary art discourse. Kazungu’s curatorial practice focuses on feminist art histories, cultural storytelling, and expanding representation for women artists in African art institutions.
