= Hartmut Koschyk =

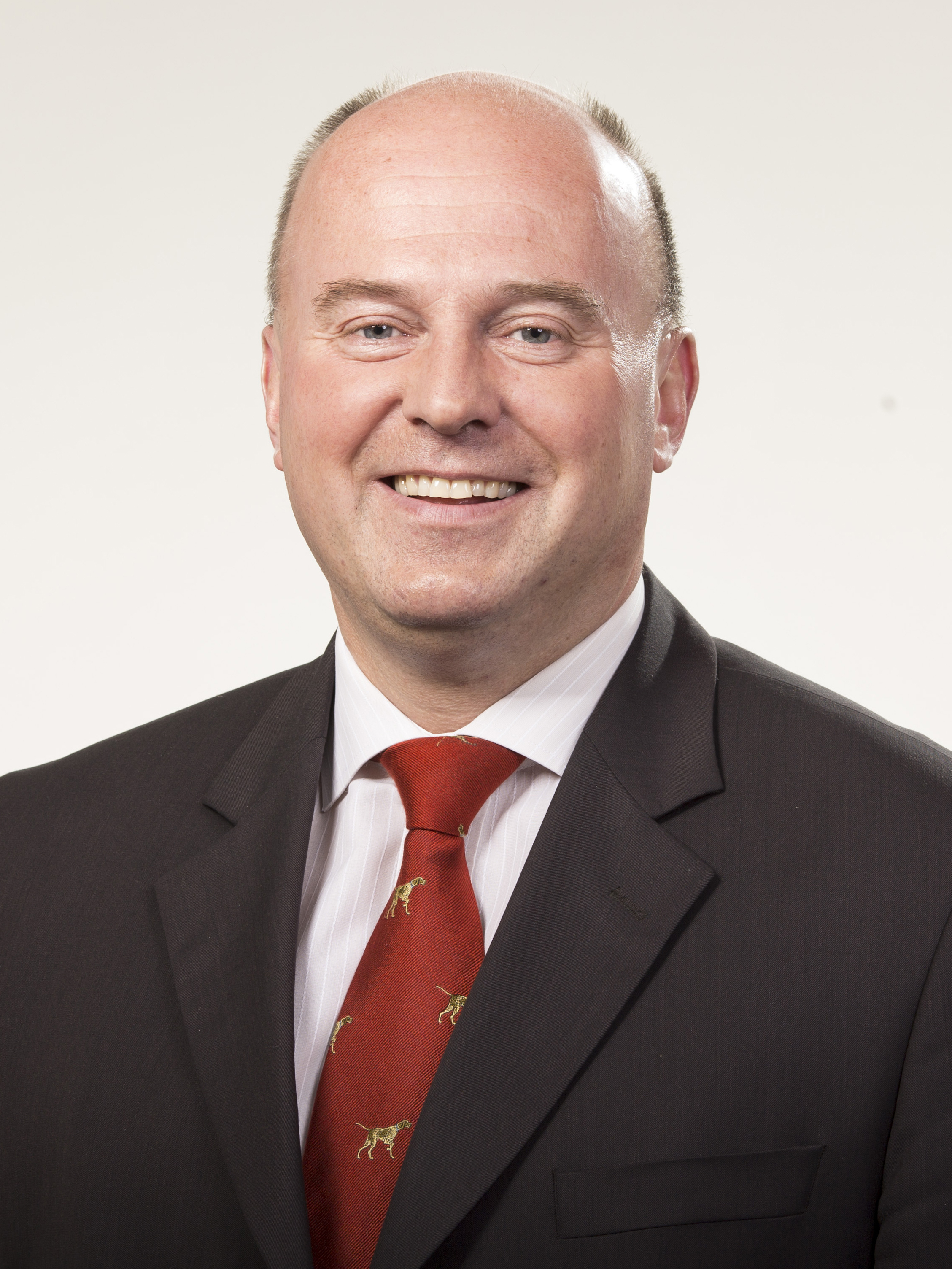
- Koschyk in 2012

Member of the Bundestag; from Bavaria
- In office 20 December 1990 – 24 October 2017
- Preceded by: Multi-member district
- Succeeded by: Silke Launert
- Constituency: State list (1990–1994); Bayreuth (1994–2017)

Personal details
- Born: 16 April 1959 (age 67) Forchheim, West Germany
- Party: Christian Social Union
- Children: 3
- Education: University of Bonn

Hartmut Koschyk (born 16 April 1959) is a German politician (CSU) and former member of the Bundestag. From 2009 to 2013, he was Parliamentary State Secretary to the Federal Minister of Finance. Prior to that, he was parliamentary director of the CSU state group in the German Bundestag from 2005 to 2009. From 2014 to 2017, Koschyk was the Federal Government Commissioner for Aussiedler Issues and National Minorities.

== Early life and career ==
Koschyk's parents came from Upper Silesia. He attended the humanistic branch of the Herder-Gymnasium Forchheim. After graduating from high school in 1978, he joined the German Armed Forces as an officer candidate, leaving in 1983. He is a lieutenant colonel in the reserve (Army).

In 1978, Koschyk joined the CSU and the Young Union. From 1983 to 1987, he was a research assistant to CDU member of parliament Helmut Sauer (Salzgitter) in the German Bundestag in Bonn. In addition, he studied history and political science at the University of Bonn.

Due to his honorary commitment in the youth association of the expellees, among other things as Federal Chairman of the Silesian Youth, he was appointed Secretary General of the Federation of Expellees in 1987 at the age of only 28. He held this office until 1991.

== Political career ==
Hartmut Koschyk was elected to the Bundestag in the 1990 Bundestag election via the Bavarian state list. In subsequent Bundestag elections, he was always elected directly as a member of parliament for the Bayreuth constituency.

Koschyk was a member of the German Bundestag from 1990 to 2017. From 1990 to 2002, he was chairman of the Working Group on Displaced Persons and Refugees and from 2002 to 2005 of the Working Group on the Interior of the CDU/CSU parliamentary group in the Bundestag. On 17 October 1991, Koschyk voted in the Bundestag against the recognition of the Oder-Neisse line as the final border between the Federal Republic of Germany and the Republic of Poland.

On 26 April 2002, a polemical statement written by Erwin Marschewski, Hartmut Koschyk and Norbert Geis on the amendment of the planned new weapons law by the then coalition of the SPD and the Greens was published on the CDU's homepage. Due to the Erfurt rampage on the same day, this press release was later withdrawn from the CDU parliamentary group's website. The press spokeswoman Ilse Falk stated that the polemics of the party debate on this topic were now forbidden.

On 28 November 2005, Koschyk was elected Parliamentary Secretary of the CSU state group in the German Bundestag and at the same time Deputy to the First Parliamentary Secretary of the CDU/CSU parliamentary group in the Bundestag.

Most recently, he served in the Bundestag as Chairman of the German-Korean Parliamentary Group. He had already chaired the group from 1998 to 2009. He did not run again in the 2017 Bundestag election.

=== Party ===
Koschyk joined the CSU in 1978. He became deputy district chairman of the CSU of Upper Franconia in 1997 and district chairman of the CSU in the Bayreuth district in 1999. From 1999 to 2018, he was chairman of the federal constituency conference in the Bayreuth-Forchheim federal constituency. As parliamentary director of the CSU state group in the Bundestag, Koschyk was co-opted into the CSU state executive committee. In addition, he is a member of the CSU party presidium, chairman of the motion committee of the CSU party congresses and the CSU party committees.

Koschyk has been a member of the Bayreuth district council since 2002.

== Personal life ==
Hartmut Koschyk has been married since 1986; the couple has three children. From 1995 to 2006, the family lived in Bindlach in the district of Bayreuth. In the meantime, the family lives in Goldkronach Castle, which was restored by them, among other things, with monument protection funds amounting to 1.4 million euros.
