= Elizabeth Borer =

American ecologist

Elizabeth Taft Borer
- Education: University of California, Santa Barbara
- Scientific career
- Workplaces: University of Minnesota
- Thesis: How do resource specialists coexist? : Evidence from a biological control community (2002)

Elizabeth T. Borer is a Regents Professor and Distinguished McKnight University professor in the College of Biological Sciences at the University of Minnesota where she also holds the Wardle Chair in microbial ecology.

== Early life and education ==
Born in Pennsylvania, Borer graduated from Oberlin College in 1991, spent several years working outside academia, then returned to earn her Ph.D. in Ecology, Evolution, and Marine Biology at the University of California, Santa Barbara in 2002 (advised by William W. Murdoch and Allan Stewart-Oaten). She went on to do postdoctoral training in the Integrative Biology Department at University of California, Berkeley with Cheryl Briggs, then a second postdoc at the National Center for Ecological Analysis and Synthesis. She was an assistant professor in the Zoology Department at Oregon State University (2004-2009) and an Associate and Full Professor at the University of Minnesota (2010–present).

== Research ==
Elizabeth Borer studies how ecological communities are impacted by global environmental changes such as nitrogen deposition, carbon dioxide emissions, invasive species, and species extinction. She is an experimentalist, but uses mathematical modeling to guide her empirical work. In 2006, she was one of a small group of scientists who conceived the Nutrient Network, a collaborative research project experimentally studying the joint impacts of nutrient deposition and loss of native herbivores in Earth's grasslands. She has co-led this collaboration since 2006, overseeing its growth from just a few sites at its inception to over 150 sites in 27 countries spanning 6 continents and creating a transformative new model for how ecologists study the impacts of global change at scale. In 2019, she co-led the launch of DRAGNet (Disturbance and Recovery Across Global Grasslands), a new collaborative global research project to assess the impact of disturbances like soil tilling on ecosystems. Borer is also known for her work in the study of disease ecology, with early large-scale experimental work to incorporate climate, land use change, and species interactions into the understanding of disease and later experimental and theoretical work uncovering feedbacks between disease and the functioning of terrestrial ecosystems.

== Honors and awards ==
As a graduate student, Elizabeth Borer received the Lancaster Award for the best dissertation in the Biological Sciences at UC, Santa Barbara. In 2015, she was selected to be a Leopold Leadership Fellow, and the following year (2016), she was named as a Fellow of the Institute on the Environment. In 2019, she was named a lifetime Fellow of the Ecological Society of America for transforming how ecologists do science through her leadership of the global Nutrient Network, and for advancing understanding of how global changes impact the composition, diversity, and function of ecosystems, including disease and microbes. In the following year (2020), she was honored as a lifetime Fellow of the American Association for the Advancement of Science for advancing understanding of Earth's grassland ecosystems. In 2022, Borer was named as the John and Abigail Wardle Chair in Microbial Ecology and as a University of Minnesota Distinguished McKnight University Professor for her contributions to microbial and global change ecology. In 2024, she was honored as a University of Minnesota Regents Professor.

== Representative publications ==
Borer's full publication list includes more than 200 peer-reviewed publications.

Borer, ET et al. 2022. Disease-mediated nutrient dynamics: reciprocal relationships link host-pathogen interactions with ecosystem elements and energy. Ecological Monographs 92(2): e1510

Borer, ET et al. 2020. Nutrients cause grassland biomass to outpace herbivory. Nature Communications 11: 6036

Grace, JB, TM Anderson, EW Seabloom, ET Borer et al. 2016. Integrative modeling reveals mechanisms linking productivity and plant species richness. Nature 529: 390-393

Harpole, WSH, LL Sullivan, EW Lind, J Firn, PB Adler, ET Borer et al. 2016. Addition of multiple limiting resources reduces grassland diversity. Nature 537: 93–96

Borer, E.T. et al. 2014. Herbivores and nutrients control grassland plant diversity via light limitation. Nature 508, 517–520

Borer, ET, WS Harpole, PB Adler, EM Lind, JL Orrock, EW Seabloom, MD Smith. 2014. Finding generality in ecology: A model for globally distributed experiments. Methods in Ecology and Evolution 5(1): 65-73

Borer, E.T., E.W. Seabloom, and D. Tilman. 2012. Plant diversity controls arthropod biomass and temporal stability. Ecology Letters 23: 1756-1765

Adler, P.B., E.W. Seabloom, E.T. Borer (and 55 Nutrient Network coauthors). 2011. Productivity is a poor predictor of plant species richness. Science 333:1750-1753.

Borer, E. T., P. R. Hosseini, E. W. Seabloom, A. P. Dobson. 2007. Pathogen-induced reversal of native perennial dominance in a grassland community. Proceedings of the National Academy of Sciences 104(13): 5473–5478.

Borer, ET, EW Seabloom, JB Shurin, KE Anderson, CA Blanchette, B Broitman, SD Cooper, BS Halpern. 2005. What determines the strength of a trophic cascade? Ecology 86(2):528-537.

Collins, JP, AP Kinzig, NB Grimm, WF Fagan, D Hope, J Wu, and ET Borer. 2000. A new urban ecology. American Scientist 88: 416-425
