= Till Förster =

German professor

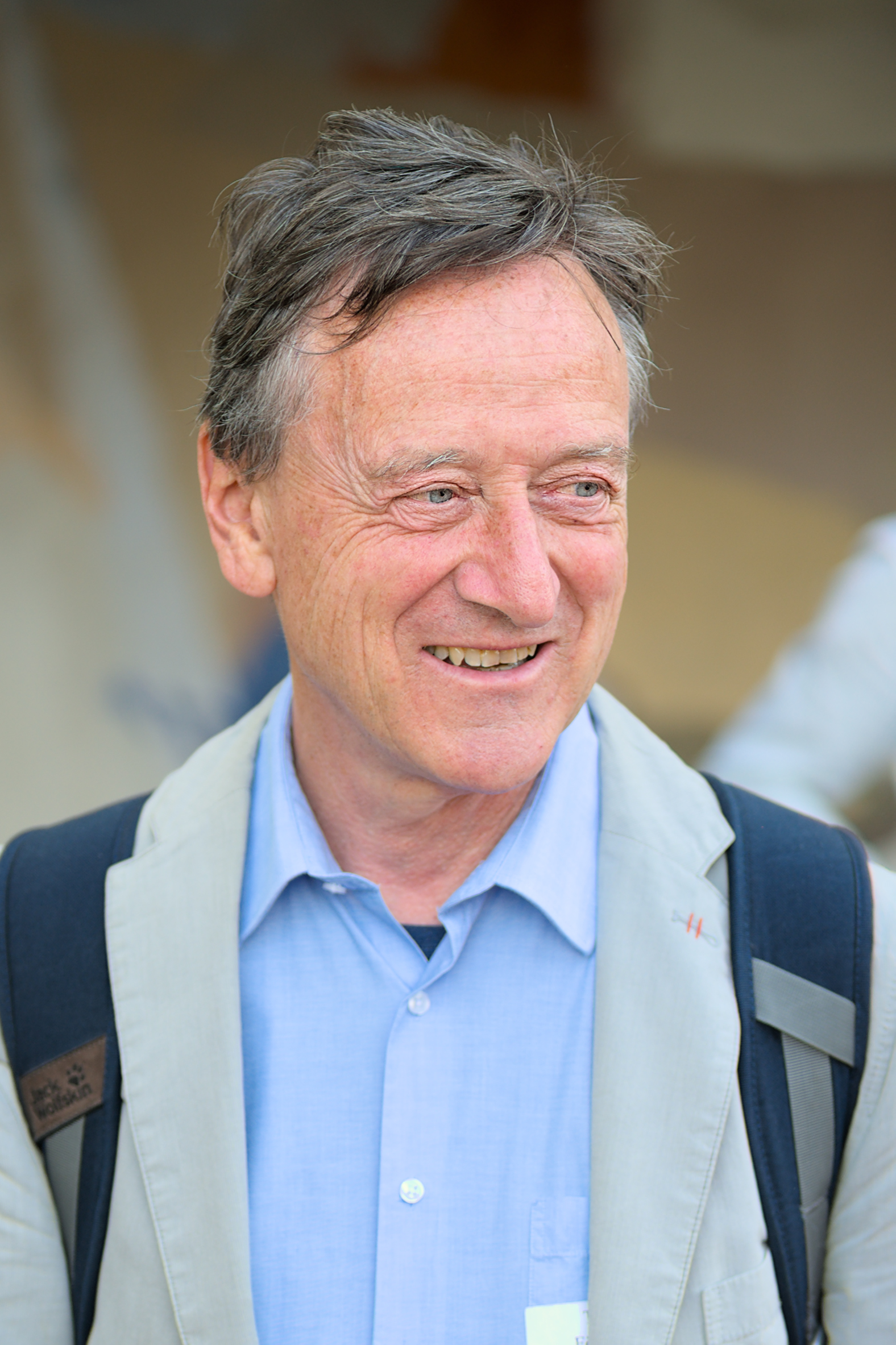
- Förster in May 2022
- Born: 9 July 1955 (age 71)
- Occupation: ethnologist
- Title: Prof. em. Dr.

Academic background
- Education: Free University of Berlin; University of Bayreuth
- Doctoral advisor: Georg Elwert

Academic work
- Discipline: Anthropology; Ethnology; Social anthropology; African studies
- Institutions: University of Basel

Till Förster (9 July 1955) is a German anthropologist. He held the chair for anthropology at the Department of Social Sciences from 2001 to 2022 and was the founding director of the Centre for African Studies at the University of Basel (Switzerland).

== Biography ==
=== Professional career ===
Förster took his A levels in 1975 at the Nicolaus-Cusanus-Gymnasium, Bonn. He studied anthropology and art history history at the universities of Mainz, Bonn and Cologne and completed his Magister Artium (MA) at the University of Bonn in 1981. In 1985, he completed his PhD at the Free University of Berlin on "Divination among the Kafibele-Senufo: On the Negotiation and Mitigation of Everyday Conflicts" (Berlin: D. Reimer Verlag, 1985). In 1994 he was awarded the qualification as a senior university lecturer at the University of Bayreuth in anthropology. His habilitation thesis was published under the title "Disrupted evolvement: everyday life, ritual and artistic forms of expression in northern Côte d'Ivoire" (in German. Cologne: R. Köppe Verlag, 1997). From 1996 to 2001, he headed the Iwalewa-house of the Africa Centre of the University of Bayreuth. From 2001 until his retirement in 2022, Förster held the chair for anthropology at the Department of Social Sciences in the Faculty of Humanities and Social Sciences at the University of Basel (Switzerland). He was also founding director of the Centre for African Studies and since 2009, its vice director for research, as well as head of the research group on "Political Transformations and Visual Culture" at the University of Basel.

From 1984 to 1988, Förster worked as an expert in international cooperation. First as seconded development expert for integrated rural development of the German Agency for International Cooperation GmbH (gtz) and the "Credit Institute for Reconstruction" (KfW) in Niger (1984–1985), as an expert on irrigated rice cultivation and land rights conflicts in the Ivory Coast (1984) and as a specialist for the social use of Biogas plants in the Ivory Coast and Burkina Faso. From 1987 to 1988, he worked for the Ifo Institute for Economic Research in Munich.

As a former development expert and long-time field researcher, he has witnessed over many years how development plans based on modern, normative assumptions about "good governance" ignored social realities in Africa and local ideas of how a just and promising social order should look like. His early scholarly interest thus drew on a basic finding: Because development programmes and projects did not take local knowledge and practice into account, they often failed. The politics of governance, development, and long-term societal transformations had been at the centre of his research (mainly) in Ivory Coast and Cameroon), as well as his teaching since the beginning of his academic career. Building on his own experience in development cooperation, Till Förster is committed to regular exchange of the academy with public policy and development practice. From 2009 through 2020, he had been a member of the Advisory Commission on International Relations and Cooperation of the Swiss government, the Federal Council, which also serves as an advisory body to the Swiss Parliament and the Swiss Agency for Development and Cooperation (SDC). He is also a member of the Working Group on Rebel Governance at Harvard University and Dartmouth College, US.

== Main fields of work ==
- ...Visual culture
- ...Social change
- ...Production, scope and cultural assimilation
- ...Intentionality and reflective practice
- ...Intermediality und transformation
- ...Rituals
- ...Nation state und statehood
- ...Non-state actors as political actors
- ...Political transformation
- ...West- and Central Africa

== Research areas ==
Förster's research profile combines two specializations: political transformations and visual culture. In his work, he rejects normative understandings of governance as the control and steering of organizations, their government or corporate management, and understands them as genuinely political processes. For Förster, governance denotes political processes of coordinated collective action between both state and non-state actors to identify and resolve complex societal problems. Corresponding to Förster's understanding of politics as all processes in which social actors discuss and negotiate how they will want to live together, coordinated collective action is not necessarily cast in institutionalised forms but can and often does grow out of the many – sometimes subtle, sometimes blatant – political interactions of social life. Förster deals in particular with the actors' ability to act, their political imagination and power of articulation as well as their interactions, which eventually lead to the formation of social and political regimes and social spaces. His conceptualisation of imagination as the social production of images has direct consequences for the study of statehood in regions where the normative imaginary of the Westphalian state has little societal relevance, because in these regions most actors develop different visions of their future that are not based on normative, usually Western understandings of statehood. Imagination creates projective ideas of how social problems should be solved. This shapes the articulation of the interests of the actors and thus the formation of larger groups and their arrangements for solving social problems.

As art historian, Förster also attaches particular importance to the visual side of his work and research documentation, in particular through colour and black-and-white photography, which is otherwise often ignored in social science research.

== Research projects (selection) ==
- ... “Life in the West African Savannah since the 1970s: Hegemony and autonomy”. With Koechlin, Lucy. (completed)
- ... “Making the City: Agency, Urbanity and Urbanisation in Ordinary Cities”. (completed)
- ... “Art/articulations: Art and the formation of Social Space in African Cities”. With Siegenthaler, Fiona. (completed)

== Awards ==
- Ordre National de la République de Côte d'Ivoire (Order of Merit of the Republic of Côte d'Ivoire, 2016).

== Publications (selection) ==
- ... “Bodily ethnography: Some epistemological challenges of participation”. Ethnography, 23.1 (2022): pp. 1–21. edoc, accessed: 24 March 2023
- ... "Alternativen zur Restitution? Lokale Perspektiven auf ein globales Problem", in Sandkühler, T., Epple, A., and Zimmerer, J. (eds.) Geschichtskultur durch Restitution? Ein Kunst-Historikerstreit. Cologne: Böhlau (Beiträge zur Geschichtskultur), pp. 163–180. (2021) edoc | Open Access, accessed: 24 March 2023
- ... Existential Transformations: Life in the West African savannah since the 1970s. Basel: Institute of Anthropology, 2020. edoc, accessed: 24 March 2023
- ... "The Invisible Social Body: Experience and poro ritual in northern Côte d’Ivoire”. African Studies Review, vol. 62.1 (2019): 99–119. edoc, accessed : 24 March 2023
- ... "The Unbearable Lightness of African Cities". Social Dynamics, vol. 44.2 (2018), pp. 405–424. edoc, accessed : 24 March 2023
- ... "Mirror Images: Mediated Sociality and the Presence of the Future”. Visual Studies, vol. 33.1 (2018), pp. 84–97. edoc, accessed : 24 March 2023
- ... « La paix dans une zone de guerre. Lire la crise ivoirienne sur le temps long et par le bas ». Politique Africaine, 2017/4 (no. 148), pp. 109–129.
- ... „Insurgent Nationalism: Political imagination and rupture in Côte d’Ivoire“. Africa Spectrum, vol. 48.3 (2013), pp. 3–31. edoc, accessed: 24 March 2023

Editorships (selection)

- ... with Fiona Siegenthaler. Aesthetics of Articulation. Basel: Institute of Anthropology, 2019 21.03.2023 edoc, accessed: 24 March 2023
- ... with Carole Ammann. African Cities and the Development Conundrum. (International Development Policy 10) Leiden: Brill, 2018. edoc, accessed: 24 March 2023
- ... with Lucy Koechlin. The Politics of Governance. New York: Routledge, 2015 [second edition 2017].
- ... with Sidney Kasfir. African Art and Agency in the Workshop. Bloomington, IN: Indiana University Press, 2013.
