= Anette Kramme =

German politician

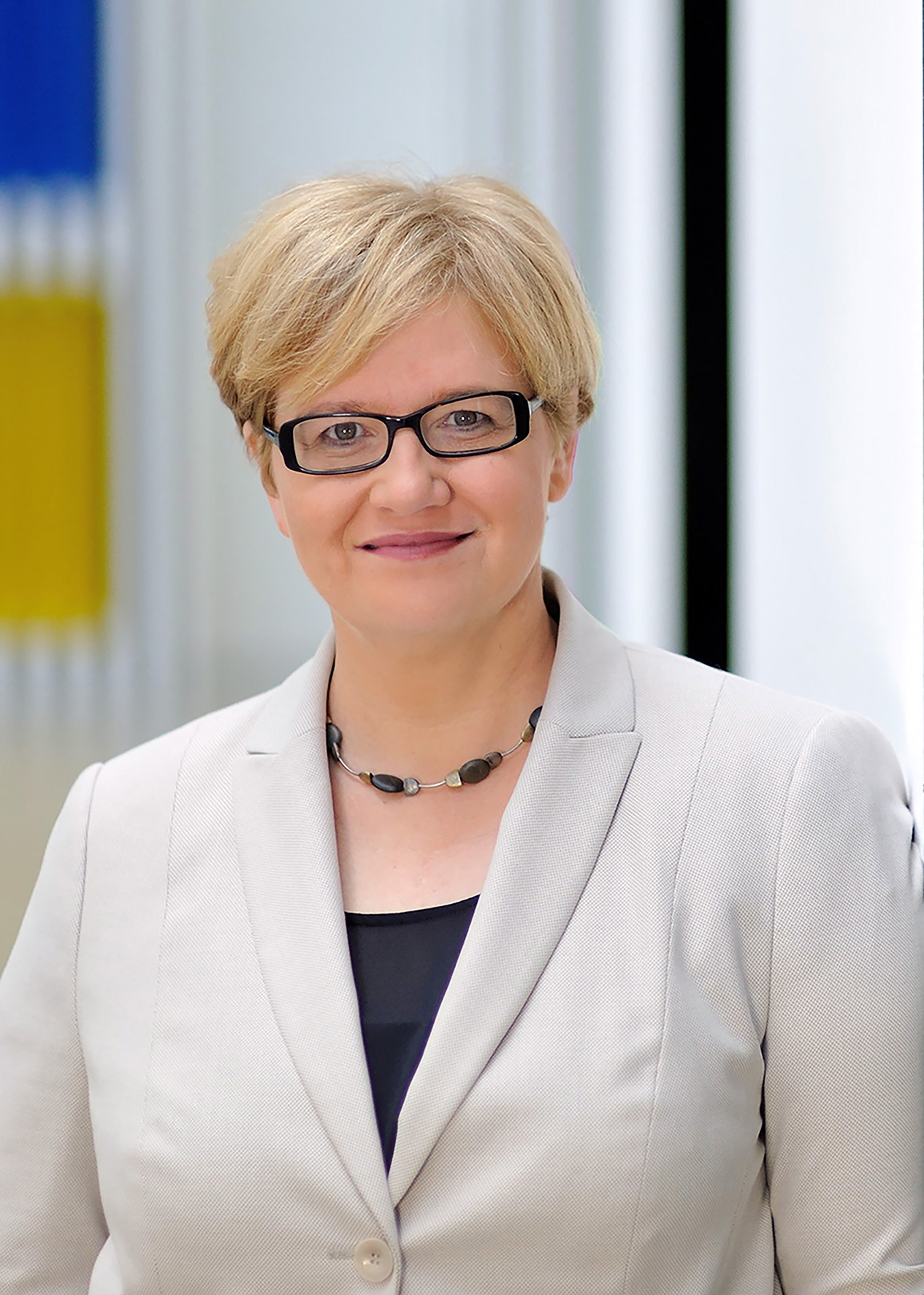
- Annette Kramme in 2023

Parliamentary State Secretary for Labour and Social Affairs
- In office 17 December 2013 – 6 May 2025
- Chancellor: Angela Merkel; Olaf Scholz
- Preceded by: Hans-Joachim Fuchtel
- Succeeded by: Katja Mast

Member of the Bundestag
- Incumbent
- Assumed office 27 September 1998
- Constituency: Bavaria

Personal details
- Born: 10 October 1967 (age 58) Essen, West Germany (now Germany)
- Party: SPD
- Education: University of Bayreuth

Anette Kramme (born 10 October 1967) is a German lawyer and politician of the SPD who has been serving as a member of the Bundestag from the state of Bavaria since 1998.

In addition to her parliamentary work, Kramme has been serving as a Parliamentary State Secretary at the Federal Ministry of Justice and Consumer Protection in the government of Chancellor Friedrich Merz since 2025. She previously was Parliamentary State Secretary at the Federal Ministry of Labour and Social Affairs in the governments of Chancellors Angela Merkel and Olaf Scholz since 2013.

== Political career ==
Kramme first became a member of the Bundestag in the 1998 German federal election. In this capacity, she has served on the Committee on Labour and Social Affairs (1998–2013) and the Committee on Legal Affairs (2002–2005). From 2009 until 2013, she was her parliamentary group's spokesperson on social policy.

In the negotiations to form a Grand Coalition of the Christian Democrats (CDU together with the Bavarian CSU) and the SPD following the 2013 federal elections, Kramme was part of the SPD delegation in the working group on labor policy, led by Ursula von der Leyen and Andrea Nahles. She has since been serving as Parliamentary State Secretary at the Federal Ministry of Labour and Social Affairs, under successive ministers Andrea Nahles (2013–2017) and Hubertus Heil (since 2017).

In the negotiations on a fourth coalition government under Merkel's leadership following the 2017 federal elections, Kramme was part of the working group on social affairs, this time led by Nahles, Karl-Josef Laumann and Barbara Stamm.

== Other activities ==
- German United Services Trade Union (ver.di), Member
- IG Metall, Member
