= Silke Launert =

German politician (born 1976)

Silke Launert MdB
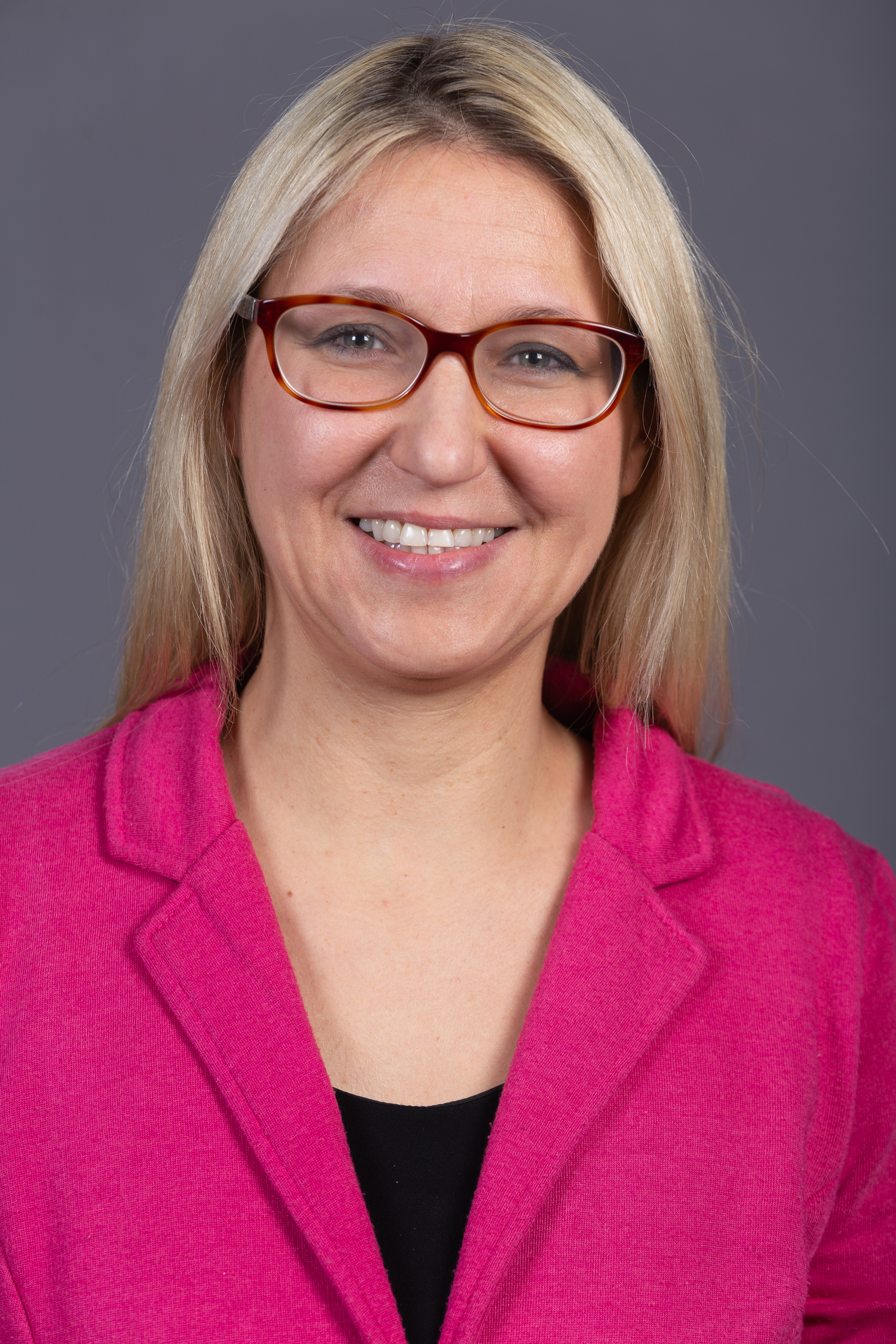
- Launert in 2020

Member of the Bundestag; from Bavaria
- Incumbent
- Assumed office 22 October 2013
- Constituency: State list (2013–2017); Bayreuth (2017–present)

Personal details
- Born: 27 December 1976 (age 49) Stadtsteinach, West Germany
- Party: Christian Social Union
- Children: 2
- Education: University of Bayreuth

Silke Launert (born 27 December 1976) is a German judge and politician of the Christian Social Union (CSU) who has been serving as a member of the Bundestag from the state of Bavaria since 2013, representing Bayreuth.

In addition to her work in parliament, Launert has been serving as a Parliamentary State Secretary at the Federal Ministry of Research in the government of Chancellor Friedrich Merz since 2025.

== Early life and education ==
From 1996 to 2001, Launert studied law at the University of Bayreuth. As part of her legal training, she completed an internship at the Embassy of Germany, Washington, D.C. in 2004. In 2013, she completed her Ph.D. thesis on spousal support in German law.

== Political career ==
Since 2013, Launert has been a member of the CSU executive board, under the leadership of successive chairs Horst Seehofer (2013–2019) and Markus Söder (since 2019).

Launert first became a member of the Bundestag after the 2013 German federal election. She was a member of the Committee for Family, Senior Citizens, Women and Youth from 2013 until 2021 before moving to the Committee on Internal Affairs and the Budget Committee in 2021. On the Budget Committee, she was the parliament's rapporteur on the annual budget of the Federal Ministry of Labour and Social Affairs. From 2022 to 2025, she chaired the Budget Committee's Subcommittee on European Affairs.

In the negotiations to form a fourth coalition government under the leadership of Chancellor Angela Merkel following the 2017 federal elections, Launert was part of the working group on families, women, seniors and youth, led by Annette Widmann-Mauz, Angelika Niebler and Katarina Barley.

In the negotiations to form a Grand Coalition between the Christian Democrats (CDU together with the Bavarian CSU) under the leadership of Friedrich Merz and the Social Democratic Party (SPD) following the 2025 German elections, Launert was part of the CDU/CSU delegation in the working group on domestic policy, legal affairs, migration and integration, led by Günter Krings, Andrea Lindholz and Dirk Wiese.

== Other activities ==
=== Corporate boards ===
- Bayreuth Medical Center, Member of the Supervisory Board (since 2020)
- Sparkasse Bayreuth, Member of the Supervisory Board (since 2017)

=== Non-profit organizations ===
- Federal Agency for Civic Education (BPB), Member of the Board of Trustees (since 2022)
- Evangelical Church in Germany (EKD), Member of the Committee on Migration and Integration (since 2016)
- Stiftung Archiv der Parteien und Massenorganisationen der DDR (SAPMO), Member of the Board of Trustees (2017–2022)
- Documentation Center for Displacement, Expulsion, Reconciliation, Member of the Board of Trustees (2017–2022)

== Political positions ==
In June 2017, Launert abstained from a parliamentary vote on Germany's introduction of same-sex marriage.

In 2020, Launert was among the founding members of the "Liberal-Conservative Circle", a group of members of the German Parliament from the CDU, CSU and FDP parties who opposed a potential coalition government with the Green Party; along with Axel Fischer and Torsten Herbst, she served as one of the group's three inaugural chairs.

== Personal life ==
Launert is divorced and a mother of two children.
