= Gerd Spittler =

German professor and ethnologist

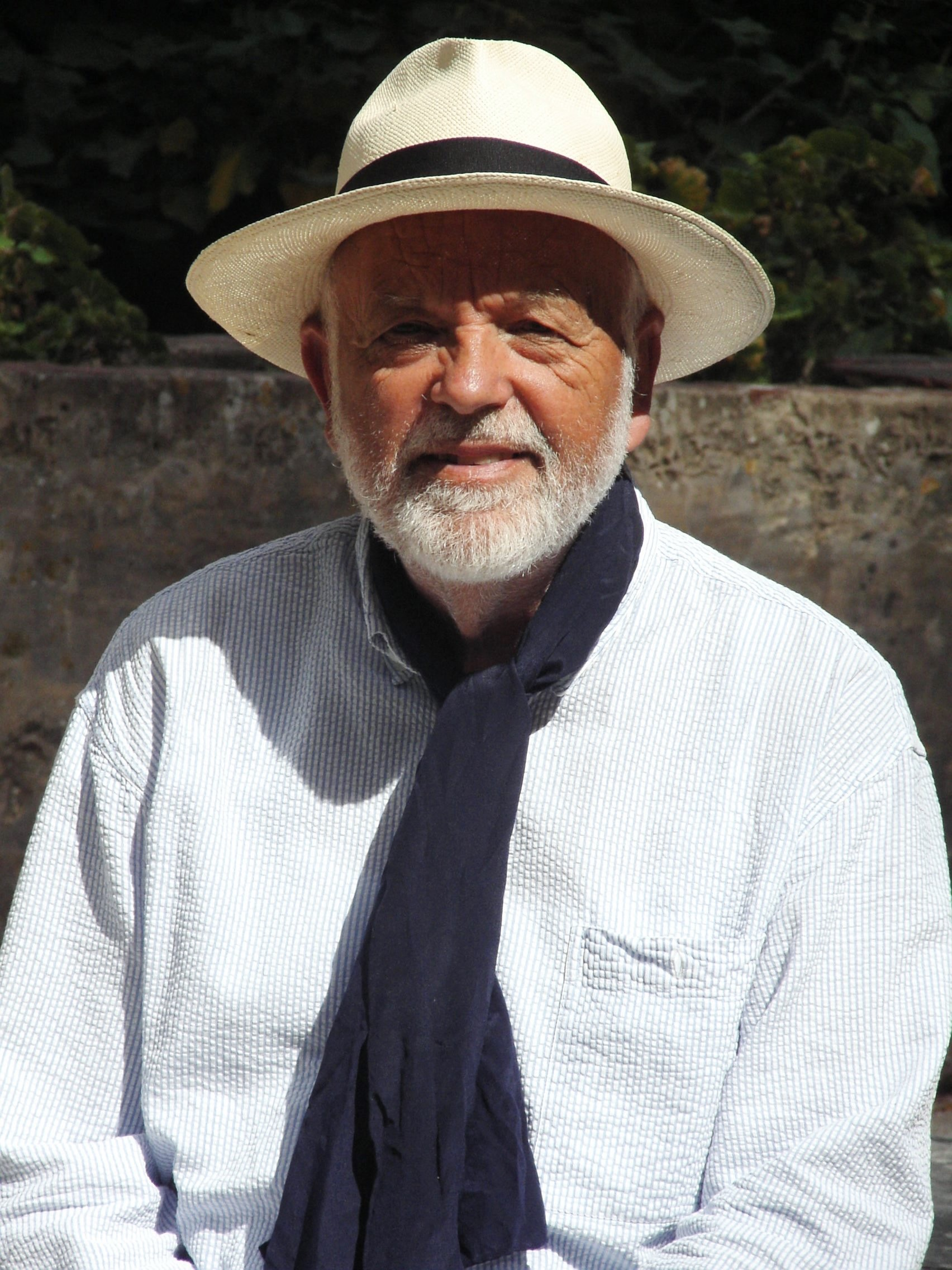
- Born: 4 April 1939; Donaueschingen, Germany
- Occupations: German ethnologist and sociologist

Academic background
- Education: University of Freiburg

Academic work
- Discipline: Anthropology; Ethnology; Sociology
- Institutions: University of Bayreuth

Gerd Spittler (born 4 April 1939 in Donaueschingen) is a German ethnologist.

Spittler became known through his participation in developing the Africa focus at the University of Bayreuth and through his research on Hausa peasants and Tuareg nomads. While in his early years as a sociologist he concentrated on the area of "power and domination", as part of his professorship in Bayreuth, as an ethnologist he later focused on other main topics: the ethnology of work, the ethnology of material needs, local action in a global context and research methodology. He has written and published many essays and books on these topics.

== Biography ==
Gerd Spittler grew up in Donaueschingen and graduated from the Fürstenberg-Gymnasium in 1958. From 1959 to 1966 he studied sociology, ethnology, economics and history at the universities of Heidelberg, Hamburg, Bordeaux, Basel and Freiburg. In 1966 he received his doctorate from the University of Freiburg. His dissertation "Norm and Sanction" included two research projects, based on participant observation, on the subject of norms and sanctions, one in a restaurant kitchen, the other in a psychosomatic clininc.

From 1968 to 1975 he worked as a research assistant of the Institute for Sociology at the University of Freiburg. In 1975 and 1976 he stepped in as stand-in professor for sociology at the Heidelberg University. In 1977 he returned to the University of Freiburg as a university lecturer. Here he taught from 1980 to 1988 as a professor of sociology. In 1976 he traveled to Niger for research purposes for the first time. His book ‘Les Touaregs face aux sécheresses et aux famines (1993) is based on research in the Tuareg area. In the course of a one-month guest professorship in 1984, he gave lectures at the University of Niamey in Niger.

From 1988 until his retirement in 2004 he held the first chair of ethnology at the University of Bayreuth. From 1990 to 1999 Spittler was chairman of the graduate college “Intercultural Relations in Africa”. From 1994 to 1999 he was managing director of the "Institute for African Studies". In 1996/1997 he took on the position of dean of the cultural studies faculty, where he also worked from 2000 to 2004 as chairman of the Collaborative Research Centre “Local action in Africa in the context of global influences”. From 2002 he also chaired the Scientific Advisory Board of ‘Point Sud. Center de Recherche sur le Savoir Local’ in Bamako, Mali.

After his retirement, Spittler taught at the universities of Basel (Switzerland), Vienna (Austria), Bayreuth, Niamey (Niger), and Sousse (Tunesia). From 2004 to 2007 he was speaker of the scientific advisory board of the Zentrum Moderner Orient in Berlin. From October 2006 to February 2007 he did research as visiting researcher at the WZB Berlin Social Science Center. In 2007 he was made an honorary member of the German Society for Social and Cultural Anthropology (DGV). In 2009/10 he was a fellow at re:work at Humboldt University in Berlin, and in 2017/18 at l’Institut d’Études Avancées in Nantes (France).

== Research focus ==
Spittler began his research with issues relating to legal sociological and legal ethnology before he concentrated on peasant societies. Here, the focus was mainly on the relationship between peasants and the state in colonial and postcolonial French Westafrica. This was followed by research on West African nomads, including the topics of drought and hunger crises, pastoral work, caravans, material culture, needs and consumption. This field of study included six years of field research among the Tuareg in Niger, Nigeria and Algeria.

As a professor of ethnology in Bayreuth, he concentrated on four areas: the anthropology of work, material needs, local action in a global context, and methods of ethnology. In addition to general reflections on the anthropology of work, a topic that has been largely neglected in ethnology to date, Spittler primarily examined the work of herdsmen and peasant in his own research. As part of the Collaborative Research Center "Identity in Africa" and the graduate college "Intercultural Relations in Africa", he dealt with the working conditions of peasants, nomads, slaves and craftsmen, among other things.

Spittler's second focus was on material needs, consumption and material culture. This happened mainly in the project of the Collaborative Research Centre (SFB/FK 560) "Local action in Africa in the context of global influences" (from 2000). Its focus was a comparison of traditional food and goods and modern, imported consumer goods. Household inventories were collected in three West African villages (Hausa, Kasena, Tuareg) and compared with German households. During the preparation and realization of this project, questions of globalization, local action, local vitality and appropriation of goods were dealt with.

== Publications (selection) ==
Overall, Spittler wrote ten monographs, edited seven readers and published over 100 essays.

=== Monographs (selection) ===
- Norm und Sanktion. Untersuchungen zum Sanktionsmechanismus. Walter, Olten 1967
- Verwaltung in einem afrikanischen Bauernstaat. Das koloniale Französisch-Westafrika 1919–1939. Steiner, Wiesbaden 1982
- Founders of the Anthropology of Work. German Social Scientists of the 19th and Early 20th Centuries. Lit, Berlin 2008
- Anthropologie der Arbeit. Ein ethnographischer Vergleich. Springer Fachmedien, Wiesbaden 2016
- Leben mit wenigen Dingen. Der Umgang der Kel Ewey Tuareg mit ihren Requisiten. Mohr Siebeck,.Tübingen 2023.

=== Edited publications (selection) ===
- with Mamadou Diawara und Farias Paulo: Heinrich Barth et l’Afrique. Köppe, Köln 2006
- with Hélène d'Almeida-Topor und Monique Lakroum: Le Travail en Afrique Noire. Représentations et pratiques à l’époque contemporaine. Karthala, Paris 2003.
- With Michael Bourdillon: African Children at Work. Working and Learning in Growing Up for Life. Lit, Berlin 2012

=== Articles (selection) ===
- • Art.Work. In: Callan, Hilary (ed.): The International Encyclopedia of Anthropology. Vol. 12. – Hoboken, NJ : Wiley Blackwell, 2018 . – S. 6490-6498K
- with Hans Peter Hahn and Markus Verne: How Many Things Does Man Need? Material Possessions and Consumption in Three West African Villages (Hausa, Kasena and Tuareg) Compared to German Students. In: Hans Peter Hahn (eds.): Consumption in Africa. Anthropological Approaches. Lit, Berlin 2008, pp. 173–200
- Administrative Despotism in Peasant Societies. In: Bill Jenkins, Edward C. Page (eds.): The Foundations of Bureaucracy in Economic and Social Thought. Elgar, Cheltenham 2004, vol. I, pp. 339–350
- Work – Transformation of Objects or Interaction with Subjects? In: Brigitta Benzing, Bernd Herrmann (eds.): Exploitation and Overexploitation in Societies Past and Present. Münster / Hamburg 2003, pp. 327–338 (reprint 2016)
- "Teilnehmende Beobachtung als Dichte Teilnahme". In: Zeitschrift für Ethnologie. vol. 126 (2001) No.1, pp. 1–25.
- "Abstraktes Wissen als Herrschaftsbasis : Zur Entstehungsgeschichte bürokratischer Herrschaft im Bauernstaat Preußen". In: Kölner Zeitschrift für Soziologie und Sozialpsychologie. vol. 3 (1980) No.2, pp. 574–604 (Reprint 2019).
- "Streitregelung im Schatten des Leviathan: eine Darstellung und Kritik rechtsethnologischer Untersuchungen." In: Zeitschrift für Rechtssoziologie. vol. 1 (1980), No 1, pp. 4–32. (Judith Bayer and Felix Girke: "The State of Custom. Gerd Spittlers "Dispute settlement in the Shadow of Leviathan" (Zeitschrift für Rechtssoziologie, vol. 1, 2021, pp. 3–20)
