= Hans Peter Hahn =

German ethnologist (born 1963)

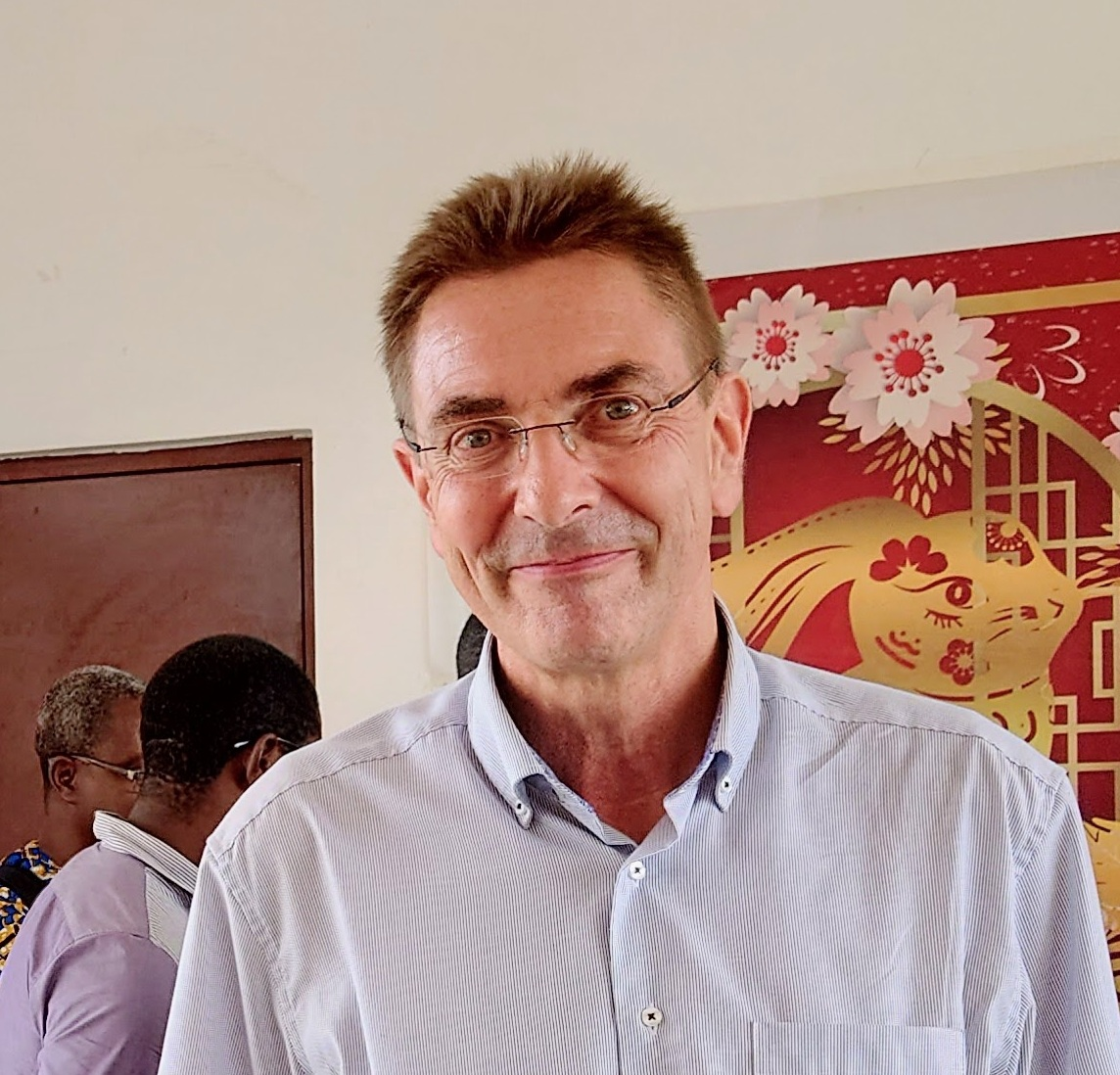
- Hahn, Table ronde in Lomé, 22 March 2023
- Born: 1963 (age 62–63); Germany
- Occupation: ethnologist

Academic background
- Education: University of Bayreuth; Goethe University Frankfurt

Academic work
- Discipline: Anthropology; Ethnology
- Sub-discipline: Sociology
- Institutions: Goethe University Frankfurt

Hans Peter Hahn (born 1963) is a German ethnologist, member of the board of the Vereinigung für Afrikawissenschaften in Deutschland (VAD E.V.) and program officer of the 'Franco-German Master of Arts : Ethnology and its German-French perspectives' (degree program variant of the Master of Arts Social and Cultural Anthropology).

== Biography ==
From 1984 to 1989 Hans Peter Hahn studied ethnology, archeology and biology at the Goethe University Frankfurt. From 1989 to 1994 he was a research associate in the collaborative research program Culture and Environment in West African savanna (SFB 268). From 1995 to 1996 he studied as a postdoc at the graduate school Intercultural Relations in Africa at the University of Bayreuth where he worked from 1996 to 2006 as a research assistant at the Institute for Ethnology. After his PhD in Frankfurt 1994 he has been teaching as a full professor for ethnology with a regional focus on West Africa at the Goethe University Frankfurt.

Hahn heads the graduate school on "value and equivalent". During his stay as a fellow at the DFG College Research Group 2615 – Free University of Berlin (April–September 2019), Hahn examined the role of material culture for social differentiation. While there are numerous ethnographic examples of the 'architecture of power', important anthropologists, e.g. Edmund Leach, criticized such a linking of objects and meaning. Together with Aegidia Souto and Jean-Louis Georget, he also directed a Franco-German doctoral college entitled 'Representing the 'Other': Museums, Universities, Ethnology' at the Goethe University Frankfurt and the Sorbonne Nouvelle University Paris 3. The college focuses on the future of ethnological collections and museums. It contributes to the internationalization of the debate and to clarify the status of collections, especially those with holdings from colonial contexts. It started its work on 1 January 2023.

== Research focus ==
West Africa (Burkina Faso, Ghana, Togo), material culture, ethnological museums, consumption, migration and mobility, and globalization.

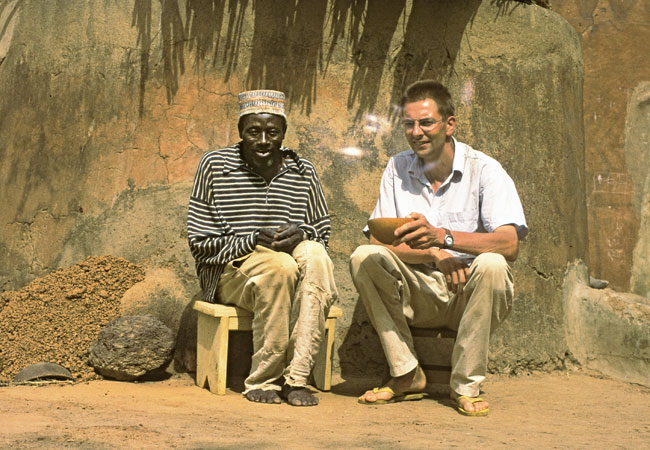
Hahn at a meeting in Kollo-Zekka, Burkina Faso, September 2005, in conversation with the village delegate Matthias Cirapia

== Publications (selection) ==
Monographs

- Hahn, Hans Peter (2015). Vom Eigensinn der Dinge (in German). Berlin: Neofelis. ISBN 978-3-95808-018-8.
- —— (2013). Ethnologie (in German). Berlin: Suhrkamp. ISBN 978-3-518-29685-1.
- —— (2014). Materielle Kultur (in German). Berlin: Reimer. ISBN 978-3-496-02869-7.
- —— (1997). Techniques de metallurgie au Nord-Togo (in French). Presses de l'UB. ISBN 978-2-909886-35-0.
- —— (1996). Die materielle Kultur der Konkomba, Kabyé und Lamba in Nord-Togo (in German). Köln: Köppe. ISBN 978-3-89645-101-9.
- —— (1993). Eisentechniken in Nord-Togo (in German). Münster: Lit. ISBN 978-3-89473-636-1.
- —— (1991). Die materielle Kultur der Bassar (Nord-Togo) (in German). Stuttgart: Steiner. ISBN 978-3-515-05967-1.
- —— (2002). Die Dinge des Alltags und materielle Kultur in Kollo (Kasena, Burkina Faso) (in German). University of Bayreuth.

Editorship

- Hahn, Hans Peter; Klöckner, Anja; Wicke, Dirk (15 March 2022). Values and Revaluations. Oxford Philadelphia: Oxbow Books Limited. ISBN 978-1-78925-813-4.
- Hahn, Hans Peter; Lueb, Oliver; Müller, Katja; Noack, Karoline (2021). Digitalisierung ethnologischer Sammlungen (in German). Bielefeld: transcript. ISBN 978-3-8376-5790-6.
- Hahn, Hans Peter; Neumann, Friedemann (17 July 2019). Das neue Zuhause (in German). Frankfurt New York: Campus Verlag. ISBN 978-3-593-50975-4.
- Ivanov, Paola; Groschwitz, Helmut; Laely, Thomas (3 April 2017). Ethnologie und Weltkulturenmuseum (in German). Berlin: Vergangenheitsverl. ISBN 978-3-86408-225-2.
- Mauss, Marcel (2015). Schriften zum Geld (in German). Berlin: Suhrkamp. ISBN 978-3-518-29742-1.
- Stockhammer, Philipp; Hahn, Hans Peter (2015). Lost in things (in German). Münster New York: Tübinger Archäologische Taschenbücher. ISBN 978-3-8309-3175-1.
- Samida, Stefanie; Eggert, Manfred K. H.; Hahn, Hans Peter (11 April 2014). Handbuch Materielle Kultur (in German). Stuttgart: J.B. Metzler. ISBN 978-3-476-02464-0.
