= Fouad Ibrahim =

Fouad N. Ibrahim (born 1938 in Damanhur, Egypt) is professor emeritus at the Institute of Geography at the University of Bayreuth in Bavaria, Germany.

Ibrahim has introduced the term desertification from French & English African geography into German-language geography. He is considered as one of the few German experts on Darfur, a region on which he wrote his Habilitation-Thesis "Desertification in Nord-Darfur" - and which is considered to this day as one of the milestone works of the geography of northern Sudan. Ibrahim was also engaged in calling worldwide attention to the humanitarian crisis in Darfur.

== Books ==
- Ägypten: [Geographie, Geschichte, Wirtschaft, Politik] zusammen mit Barbara Ibrahim, Darmstadt: Wiss. Buchges., 2006. - XIV, 224 S.: Ill., Kt., graph. Darst.; 270 mm x 210 mm; (deutsch), ISBN 3-534-17420-8
- Desertification in Nord-Darfur: Untersuchung zur Gefährdung des Naturpotentials durch nicht angepasste Landnutzungsmethoden in der Sahelzone der Republik Sudan / von Fouad N. Ibrahim. In Verbindung mit d. Inst. für Geographie u. Wirtschaftsgeographie d. Univ. Hamburg. Hamburg: Hirt, 1980. - XIII, 175 S.: 16 Ill., 42 graph. Darst. u. Kt. & Kt.-Beil (6 Bl.); (deutsch) (Hamburger geographische Studien; 35)
