= Sabine Ludwigs =

German chemist

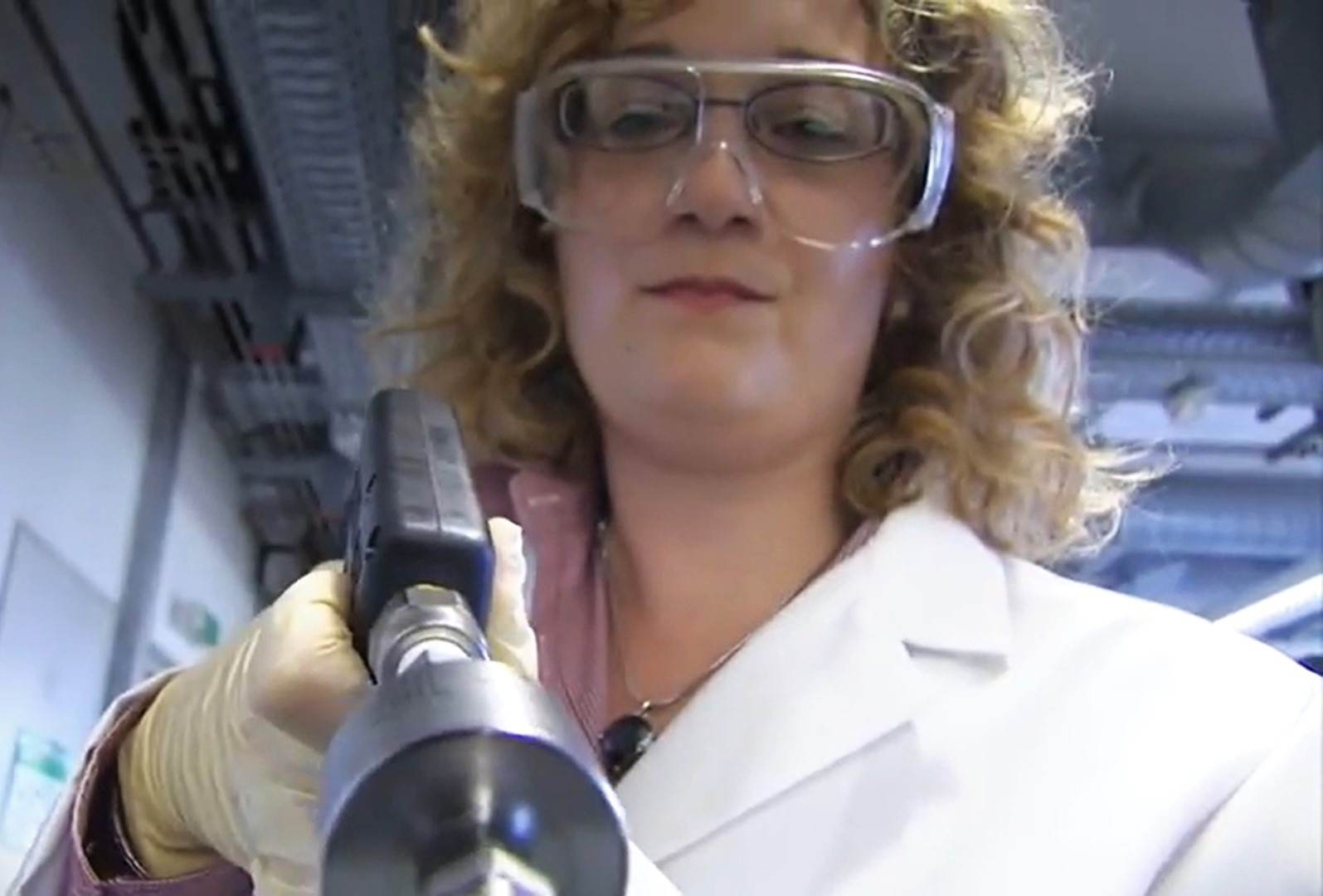
- Ludwigs at the Freiburg Institute for Advanced Studies in 2018
- Born: 1978 (age 47–48); Cologne
- Education: University of Bayreuth
- Scientific career
- Workplaces: University of Cambridge; University of Freiburg; University of Stuttgart
- Thesis: Complex nanostructures in triblock terpolymer thin films (2004)

Sabine Ludwigs (born 1978) is a German chemist who is a full professor at the University of Stuttgart. Her research considers conductive molecular materials for technologies including organic electronics and actuators. She investigates the functional properties (optical, electronic, electrochemical) of conductive polymers.

== Early life and education ==
Ludwigs was born in Cologne. She was an undergraduate student at the University of Bayreuth, where she remained for her doctoral research in physical chemistry. Her research involved investigations into the complex nanostructures that form in triblock terpolymer thin films. She moved to the University of Cambridge as a postdoctoral researcher, where she spent two years.

== Research and career ==
In 2006, Ludwigs established her own research group at the Institute for Macromolecular Chemistry at the University of Freiburg. She was a Junior Fellow and awarded an Emmy Noether Fellowship. She spent four years in the Freiburg Material Research Center before moving to the University of Stuttgart as Full Professor of Structure and Properties of Polymeric Materials.

Ludwigs' research considers semiconducting molecular materials for next-generation technologies, including organic electronics and soft robotics. She investigates how molecular design impacts the functional properties of materials and structure-function relationships (e.g. how structure and morphology impacts optical and electronic properties). Alongside electrons, molecular materials can enable ionic transport, which makes them valuable materials for bioelectronics, personalised therapeutics and wearable medical devices.

Since 2020 she has served as Associate Editor of Macromolecules.

== Fellowships and awards ==
- 2002 Award of the Otto-Warburg-Chemiestiftung
- 2006 Awards for excellent research work, Otto-Röhm-Gedächtnisstiftung
- 2007 Invited Professorship, Université Louis Pasteur, Strasbourg
- 2008 Junior Fellow in the Freiburg Institute for Advanced Studies
- 2008 Emmy Noether Group of the German Research Association
- 2008 Elite stipend of the Baden-Württemberg-Foundation
- 2009 Eugen-Graetz Award
- 2016 Invited Professorship, Ecole Polytechnique, LabEx CHARMMMAT

== Selected publications ==
- Jürgen Heinze; Bernardo A Frontana-Uribe; Sabine Ludwigs (1 August 2010). "Electrochemistry of conducting polymers--persistent models and new concepts". Chemical Reviews. 110 (8): 4724–4771. doi:10.1021/cr900226k. ISSN 0009-2665. PMID 20557047. Wikidata Q84428688.
- Edward J W Crossland; Marleen Kamperman; Mihaela Nedelcu; et al. (1 August 2009). "A bicontinuous double gyroid hybrid solar cell". Nano Letters. 9 (8): 2807–2812. doi:10.1021/nl803174p. ISSN 1530-6984. PMID 19007289. Wikidata Q47236233.
- Sabine Ludwigs; Alexander Böker; Andrej Voronov; Nicolaus Rehse; Robert Magerle; Georg Krausch (26 October 2003). "Self-assembly of functional nanostructures from ABC triblock copolymers". Nature Materials. 2 (11): 744–747. doi:10.1038/nmat997. ISSN 1476-1122. PMID 14578880. Wikidata Q58216620.
