= Tobias Peterka =

German politician

Member of the Bundestag
- Incumbent
- Assumed office 24 October 2017

Personal details
- Born: 4 September 1982 (age 43) Achern, West Germany
- Party: AfD

Tobias Peterka (born 4 September 1982) is a German politician for the right-wing populist AfD. Since 2017, he has been a member of the Bundestag, the German federal diet.

== Life and achievements ==
Peterka was born in 1982 in the West German town of Achern. He studied jurisprudence at the University of Bayreuth. He joined the newly founded AfD in 2013 and became a member of the Bundestag in 2017.
