= Melinda D. Smith =

American ecologist

- Education: Kansas State University
- Scientific career
- Workplaces: Colorado State University
- Thesis: Causes and consequences of species invasion and loss : the role of dominant species and diversity in maintaining ecosystem function (2002)

Melinda D. Smith is an American ecologist who is a professor at Colorado State University. Her research looks to understand the patterns and dynamics of plant species (in particular grassland ecosystems) and how they impact ecosystem function. She was elected Fellow of the American Association for the Advancement of Science in 2023.

== Early life and education ==
Smith completed her doctorate at Kansas State University. Her doctoral research studied the causes of species invasion and loss, and the "dominant" species that maintain ecosystem function.

== Research and career ==
Smith studies grassland ecosystems, such as mixed and tall grass prairies in the Central Great Plains, and looks to understand the patterns of species diversity and abundance. She studies the causes of extinctions and invasions of species and the drivers for species coexistence. She was awarded the Murray F. Buell Award in 2001.

Smith led the International Drought Experiment. She studied the impact of short-term droughts on grassland across six continents, showing how they disrupt carbon cycles and destroy ecosystems.

She was elected a Fellow of the Ecological Society of America in 2017. In 2021, Smith was elected to the Faculty Council at Colorado State University. She was made Faculty Council Chair in 2023. In 2023 she was elected Fellow of the American Association for the Advancement of Science.

== Selected publications ==
- Alan K. Knapp; Melinda D. Smith (1 January 2001). "Variation among biomes in temporal dynamics of aboveground primary production". Science. 291 (5503): 481–484. Bibcode:2001Sci...291..481K. doi:10.1126/science.291.5503.481. ISSN 0036-8075. PMID 11161201. Wikidata Q39120761.
- Forest Isbell; Dylan Craven; John Connolly; et al. (14 October 2015). "Biodiversity increases the resistance of ecosystem productivity to climate extremes". Nature. 526 (7574): 574–577. doi:10.1038/nature15374. ISSN 1476-4687. PMID 26466564. Wikidata Q31004939.
- Alan K Knapp; Philip A Fay; John M. Blair; et al. (1 December 2002). "Rainfall variability, carbon cycling, and plant species diversity in a mesic grassland". Science. 298 (5601): 2202–2205. doi:10.1126/science.1076347. ISSN 0036-8075. PMID 12481139. Wikidata Q57068426.
