= Iwalewahaus =

Building for art projects in Bayreuth, Germany

Coordinates: 49.9446°N 11.5796°E

Iwalewahaus, University of Bayreuth, is a place for the production and presentation of contemporary art. By doing exhibitions, academic research and teaching, by taking care of the collection and the archive as well as providing residencies for artists, recent developments in contemporary African and Diaspora culture are presented and refined together with artists and institutions. The Iwalewahaus collection comprises over 12,000 works of art, making it the largest institutional collection of contemporary African art in Europe. The mission of Iwalewahaus is to research, document and teach recent African culture. The focus is on visual arts, everyday culture, the media and music. The house provides space for lectures, conferences, concerts, film screenings and readings and is a vivid forum for artists, researchers, students of African studies and the interested public.

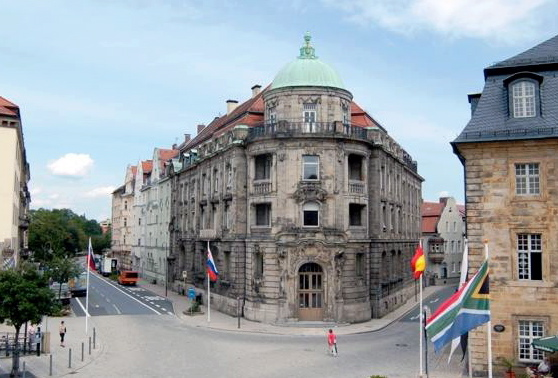
Iwalewahaus at Wölfelstraße 2, 95444 Bayreuth

== Research and teaching ==
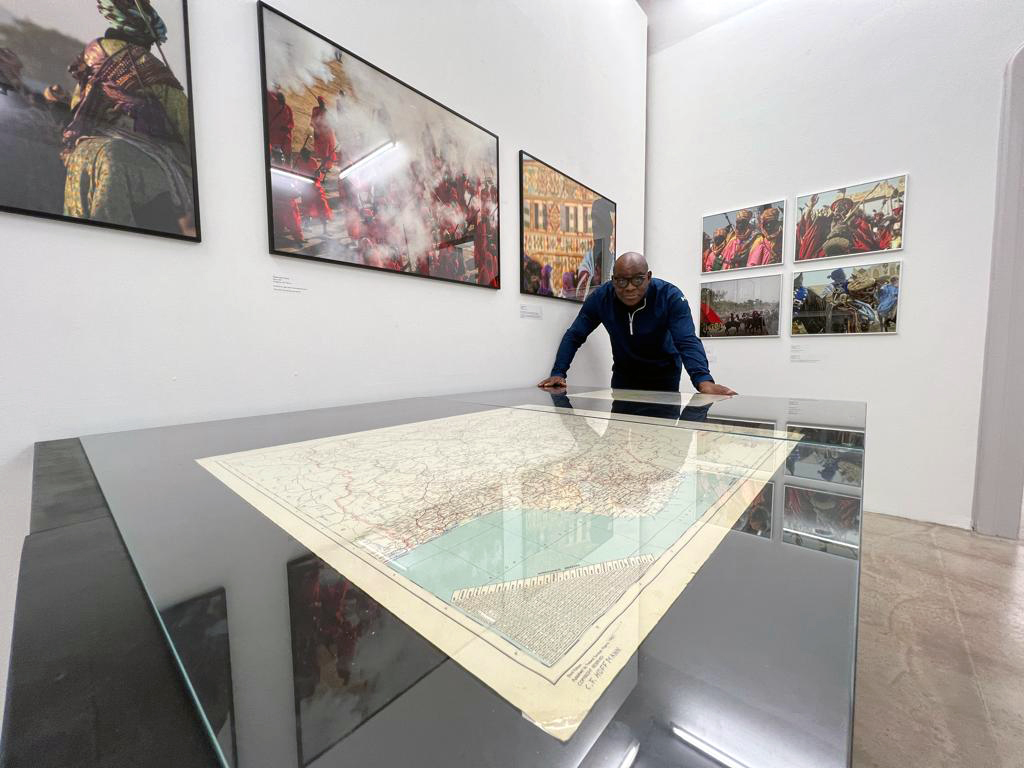
Contemporary Artist Mallam Mudi Yahaya, Iwalewahaus, University of Bayreuth 2023

Most of the Iwalewa-projects are developed in close cooperation with institutions from Africa and Europe and are supported by publications. The focus of the research is contemporary art, popular culture, the media - especially photography - as well as African modernity and museology.

The following projects are part of the research: Africa Screams – Das Böse in Kino, Kunst und Kult (2004); Black Paris (2006); Hidden Pages, Stolen Bodies (2009); Piga Picha! (2008/2010), Iwalewa - Quatre vues de l’Afrique contemporaine (2013), Al'umma Society Celebrating Life - Hausa Society of Northern Nigeria in two photography perspectives by Nina Fischer-Stephan & Mallam Mudi Yahaya (2023) and Twins Seven Seven and his Yorùbá Universe (2024).

The teaching at Iwalewahaus concentrates on four areas: art studies with reference to Africa, aspects of African popular culture, institutionalisation and interaction of art worlds and finally broader questions of the history of media and the study of visual culture. Since 2012 the practise based study program "Art and Curatorial Studies" has been offered as part of the master studies course "Culture and Society in Africa".

== Collection ==
Iwalewahaus maintains a collection of modern and contemporary visual arts from Africa, Asia and the Pacific Area that is unique within Germany. The main focus of the collection is Nigeria, but there are equally important artworks from Sudan, Mozambique, Tanzania, DR Congo, Haiti, India, Papua New Guinea and Australia. The collection is generally based on the collection of Ulli Beier, the founder of Iwalewahaus. The collection of paintings, especially those of the Oshogbo-school plus the collection of graphics with a focus on the Nigerian Nsukka-school is of international significance. Apart from visual arts, the archive of Iwalewahaus hosts an extensive collection of contemporary African music, video film productions from Nigeria and Ghana and African textiles. The collection has recently been expanded by private donations like the collection Kleine-Gunk and the Kindermann collection. These extensions secure the collection’s status as the largest public collection of African contemporary art in Europe for the long term.

== Naming ==
The saying Iwalewa is borrowed from the language of the Yoruba, one of the three major ethnic groups in south-west Nigeria. Translated literally, Iwalewa means “character is beauty“. The term Iwa stands for the “good character“, although the original meaning of Iwa can be translated as “existence“.

We christened this house Iwalewa to present more than the exotic of alien cultures. We don’t want to limit our interest to the formal beauty of foreign artworks but try to grasp its real identity – its Iwa.

— Ulli Beier

== History ==
The house opened its doors on November 27, 1981, as a support for the Africa focus of the University of Bayreuth. The aim was to introduce a broader public to non-European arts and culture. Founder and first head of Iwalewahaus from 1981 to 1985 was Ulli Beier (1922–2011). Beier was a noted connoisseur of Nigeria’s arts and culture. When Beier moved to Papua New Guinea in 1985, Ronald Ruprecht became director of the house. From 1989 to 1996 the house again was under the aegis of Ulli Beier. From 1997 to 2001 Iwalewahaus was directed by Till Förster. When Förster moved to the University of Basel, Tobias Wendl became new director. After Wendl was offered a chair at the Free University of Berlin Iwalewahaus has been directed by Ulf Vierke and Nadine Siegert as Deputy Director since 2010.

== Building ==
From 1981 until the end of 2013 the domicile of Iwalewahaus was a former mint ("Markgräfliche Münze"), a sandstone building protected as an historic monument from the 18th century.

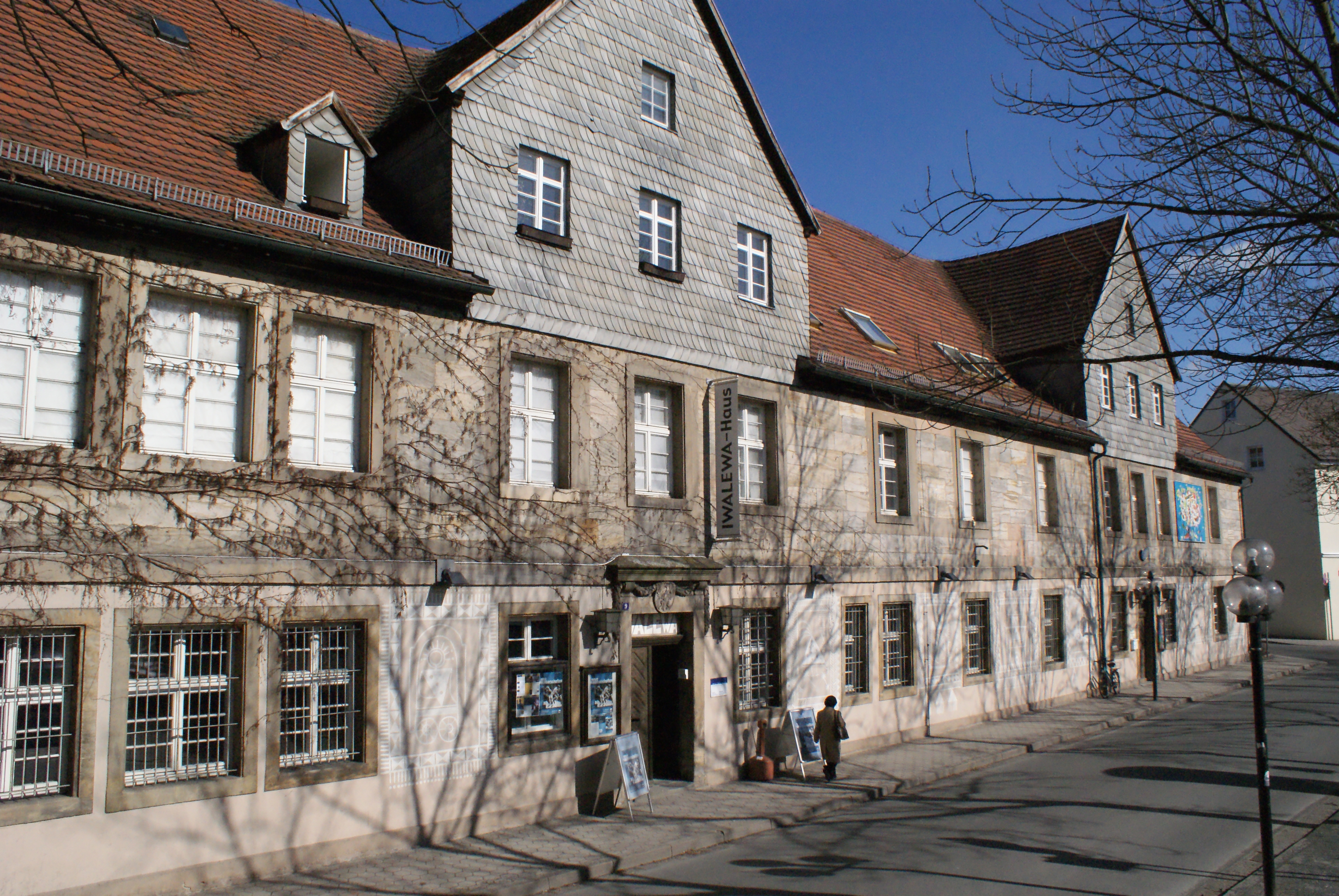
The old Iwalewahaus (1981 to 2013) at Münzgasse 9, 95444 Bayreuth

In November 2013 Iwalewahaus moved to its new residence at Wölfelstraße 2. This building was built in 1907 for the Bavarian state’s bank in Oberfranken. During the 1970s the building was adopted by the forestry office and finally used by the surveyor’s office and the building authorities. Including the basement and loft, the structure offers nearly 2,300 square meters for offices and space for exhibitions and the archive.
