= Erwin Marschewski =

German politician

Member of the Bundestag
- In office 29 March 1983 – 18 October 2005

Personal details
- Born: 31 March 1940 (age 86)
- Party: CDU

Erwin Marschewski (born 31 March 1940) is a German politician of the Christian Democratic Union (CDU) and former member of the German Bundestag.

== Life ==
He was a member of the German Bundestag from 29 March 1983 to 2005 (six election periods) and was elected via the state list of the Christian Democratic Union of Germany (CDU) in North Rhine-Westphalia. He was the chairman of the working group on displaced persons and refugees of the CDU/CSU parliamentary group.

== Literature ==
Herbst, Ludolf; Jahn, Bruno (2002). Vierhaus, Rudolf (ed.). Biographisches Handbuch der Mitglieder des Deutschen Bundestages. 1949–2002 [Biographical Handbook of the Members of the German Bundestag. 1949–2002] (in German). München: De Gruyter - De Gruyter Saur. p. 1715. ISBN 978-3-11-184511-1.
