= Thomas Hacker =

German politician (born 1967)

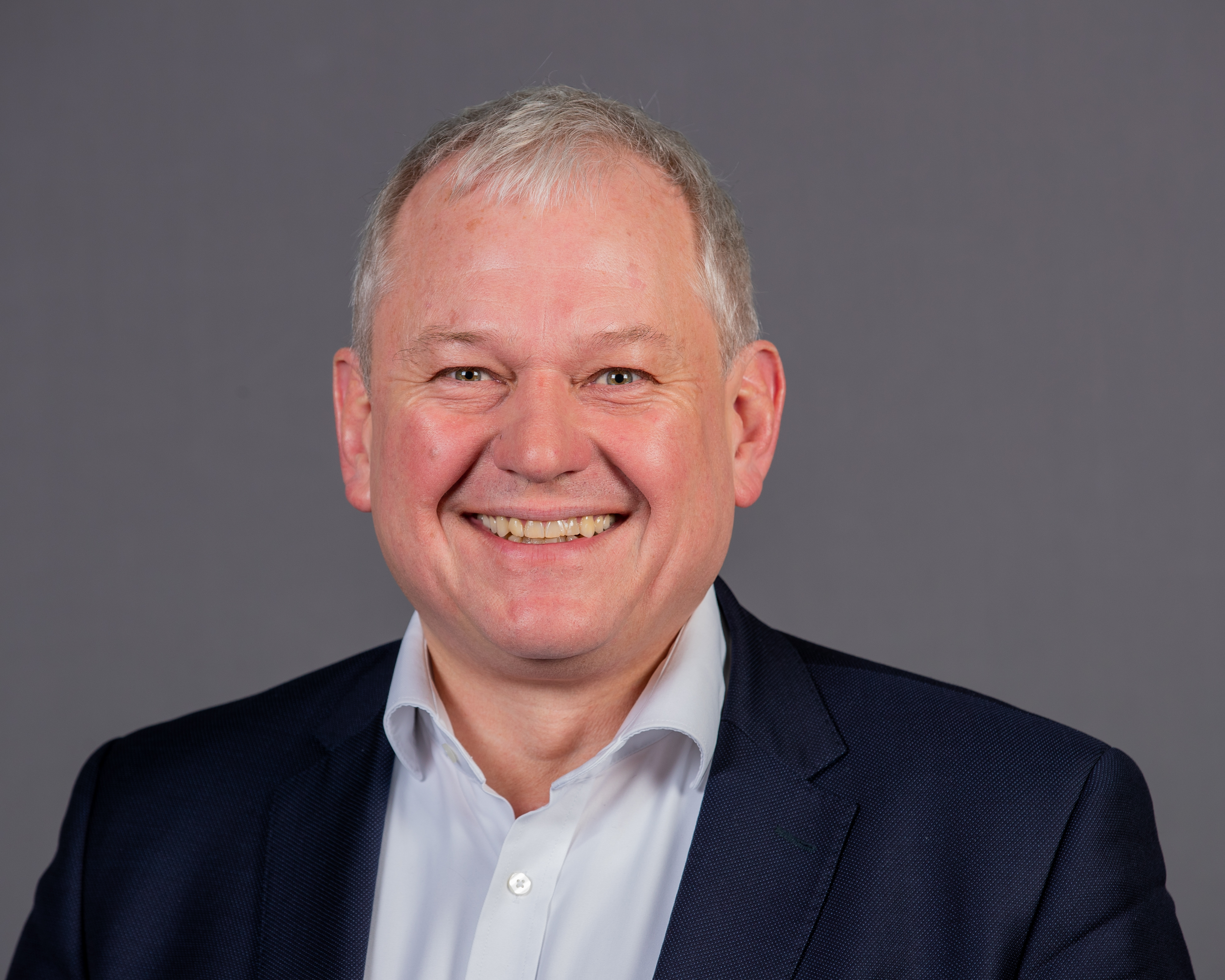
- Hacker in 2020

Member of the Bundestag
- In office 2017–2025

Personal details
- Born: 9 October 1967 (age 58) Bayreuth, West Germany (now Germany)
- Party: FDP
- Education: University of Bayreuth
- Occupation: Banker

Thomas Hacker (born 9 October 1967) is a German tax consultant and politician of the Free Democratic Party (FDP) who served as a member of the Bundestag from the state of Bavaria from 2017 to 2025.

== Early life and career ==
Hacker was born in Bayreuth. After high school graduation and military service, he completed an apprenticeship as a bank clerk and then studied business administration at the University of Bayreuth, majoring in business taxation, finance and banking management.

From 2002 to 2016 Hacker was a partner in an auditing and tax consultancy firm based in Kulmbach.

== Political career ==
=== Career in state politics ===
Since 1995 Hacker has been a member of the FDP. From 2008 until 2013, he served as a member of the Landtag of Bavaria. During that period, he chaired the FDP parliamentary group.

=== Member of the German Parliament, 2017–2025 ===
Hacker was a member of the German Bundestag from 2017 to 2025, representing Bayreuth. In parliament, he was a member of the Committee on European Affairs and the Committee on Cultural Affairs and Media. He also served as his parliamentary group's spokesman on media policy.

In the negotiations to form a so-called traffic light coalition of the Social Democratic Party (SPD), the Green Party and the FDP following the 2021 federal elections, Hacker was part of his party's delegation in the working group on cultural affairs and media policy, co-chaired by Carsten Brosda, Claudia Roth and Otto Fricke.

== Other activities ==
- Memorial to the Murdered Jews of Europe Foundation, Member of the Board of Trustees (since 2022)
- Federal Foundation for the Reappraisal of the SED Dictatorship, Alternate Member of the Board of Trustees (since 2022)
- Stasi Records Agency, Member of the Advisory Board
- Thomas Dehler Foundation (since 2011)
