= Global change ecology =

Geo science research field

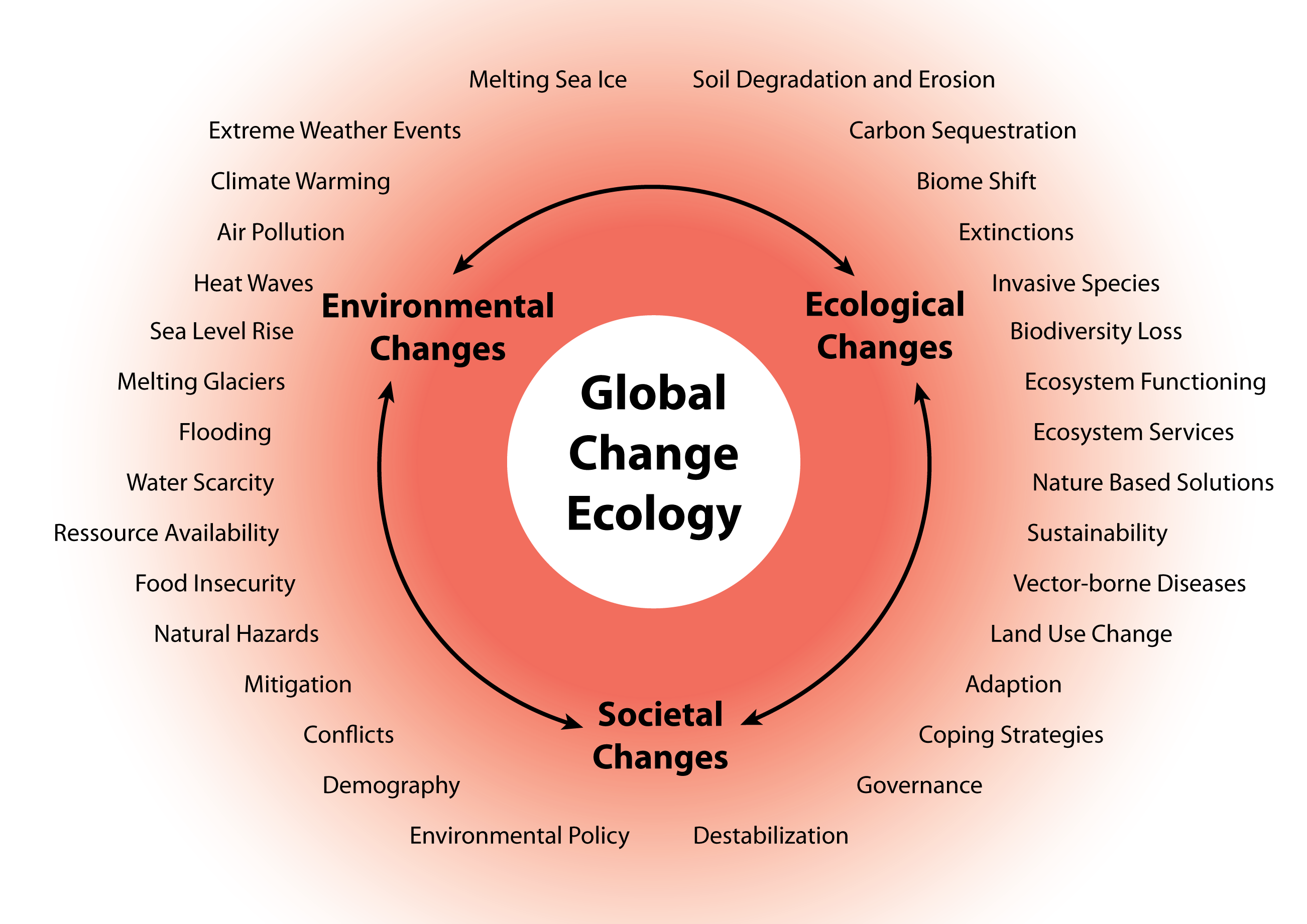
The figure illustrates main research topics and some specialized examples that are central to the transdisciplinary field of global change ecology.

Global change ecology (GCE) is a transdisciplinary field of science that addresses changes of populations or communities of organisms and their consequences and interactions on natural environment, ecosystems and societies on a global scale. Main drivers of these global changes are climate change, biodiversity loss, pollution, land use change and introduction of non native species. Abiotic and biotic aspects of Global change ecology are covered by earth system science. The societal aspects of global change are manifold including economic, human health, adaptation and mitigation strategies and environmental policy. Global change ecology is devoted to understanding and analyzing global environmental concerns of the Anthropocene.

== History ==
The research field of global change ecology has evolved from traditional ecology. It has broadened its focus from organisms or populations on a smaller scale to encompass broader ecosystems as part of the Earth system. The term "global change ecology" itself was first published in an article in 1991. However, the discipline has its roots as far back as the 1960s, when Keeling highlighted the seasonal fluctuations in CO₂ levels that can be explained by photosynthesis activity of terrestrial vegetation. Back then, in scientific community, it was clear that, with land-use changes accelerating and emissions rising, humans were having an enormous impact on ecosystems. This was also stated in the remarkable publication "The Limits to Growth" in 1974. In the early 1990s, an increasing number of scientific articles on global change and environmental factors were published, because there was a lack of knowledge about the details of interactions between the ecosystems, other earth spheres and societies.

== Research ==
Global Change Ecology research is investigating large-scale processes such as climate change, land use change, biodiversity loss, natural hazards, trans-continental connectivity, and their consequences for ecosystems and societies. It aims to identify and predict future drivers, pressures, resilience, thresholds, tipping points, and eventually emerging unexperienced novel conditions. This requires innovative transdisciplinary approaches to bridge the gap between humans and the environment. Research challenges are related to the integration of physical, chemical, and biological natural sciences and their application to the large-scale dynamics of the geosphere. This includes the broad spectrum of terrestrial biomes and atmospheric as well as oceanic circulation. Due to the anthropogenic drivers and the effects of global changes on societies, a nexus between natural and social sciences needs to be created.

Methods in Global Change Ecology include the mining of big data, ecological modelling, coordinated manipulative experiments, and environmental monitoring based on remote sensing. State changes are detected and future trends are predicted in order to inform decision making and to prepare for sustainable nature-based solutions and adaptation strategies. To capture uncertainty about future trends, scenarios (e.g. emission scenarios such as Shared Socioeconomic Pathways SSPs) are developed that consider various future options in human behavior, political decisions, and economic development, which are the basis for estimates on the emission of greenhouse gases and climate change modelling.

== Education ==
Global Change Ecology can be studied at several universities. Some Universities that offer a Global Change Ecology M. Sc. study program are listed here:

- University of Bayreuth (Germany)
- University of Bologna (Italy)
- University of Würzburg, (Germany)
- University of Bergen (Norway)
- King Juan Carlos University (Spain)
- Bangor University (UK)
- Autonomous University of Tlaxcala (Mexico)

== See also ==
- Planetary health
- Ecology
- Biogeography
- Climatology
- Climate change
