= University of Bayreuth =

Public research university in Germany

Coordinates: 49°55′44″N 11°35′09″E

- Universität Bayreuth
- Motto: Ordo et Claritas (Order and brightness)
- Type: Public
- Established: 1975
- Affiliations: Santander Network
- Budget: € 236 million
- Chancellor: Nicole Kaiser
- President: Stefan Leible
- Academic staff: 274
- Administrative staff: 2,617
- Students: 12,516
- Location: Bayreuth, Bavaria, Germany
- Campus: Urban
- Colours: Green and white
- Website: www.uni-bayreuth.de

The University of Bayreuth (German: Universität Bayreuth) is a public research university located in Bayreuth, Germany. It is one of the youngest German universities. It is broadly organized into seven undergraduate and graduate faculties, with each faculty defining its own admission standards and academic programs in near autonomy.

The university offers several interdisciplinary courses such as Global Change Ecology, Theatre and Media Studies, and Health Economics. It is a member of the Elite Network of Bavaria (Elitenetzwerk Bayern), an educational policy concept of Bavaria for the promotion of gifted pupils and students in the higher education sector.

== History ==
=== Foundation of the University ===
On 5 November 1969, the Bayreuth City Council addressed the economic stagnation and emigration trends in northeastern Bavaria as a result of its location near the borders with the GDR and Czechoslovakia. In order to initiate an effective structural improvement, which would guarantee equivalent living conditions with the rest of the federal territory, various measures were necessary. In this context, they unanimously requested the establishment of a university in the city. On 19 March 1970, a university association was founded, whose membership quickly grew to 800. In addition to Bayreuth, Bamberg, Coburg, Landshut, Passau and Ingolstadt also applied as locations for a university or college.

Members of all parties represented in the Bavarian state parliament, the district parliament of Upper Franconia and numerous public figures campaigned for the construction of the university. Konrad Pöhner and Simon Nüssel as well as the mayor of Bayreuth, Hans Walter Wild, who showed great negotiating skills, deserve special mention. As early as 16 July 1970, a Landtag resolution was reached according to which the next Bavarian state university was to be located in Bayreuth. In 1971, the Science Council recommended that the university be included in the measures under the Higher Education Construction Promotion Act. A structural advisory board was formed under the chairmanship of physicist Wolfgang Wild, which expected the university to have 8500 student places and 3200 employees by 1985. The university's new location was approved by the Bavarian state parliament.

The university was established by the Bavarian Parliament on 1 January 1972, as the seventh Bavarian state university. The Landtag's decision was celebrated in the city with a torchlight procession on 14 December 1971. "Since this afternoon at 2:19 p.m., Bayreuth is once again a university city!" the mayor had announced to the approximately 3000 citizens who had gathered in front of the city hall. Police loudspeaker trucks announced the event throughout the city; church bells, the first official ringing of the new city hall carillon, a rally, a rocket shot from the roof of the city hall, brass band music, and free beer gave expression to the general joy."

Instead of the sites Wendelhöfen and Roter Hügel, which had also been considered, the site of the former parade ground south of the Kreuzstein and Birken districts was chosen. The office of the University of Bayreuth began its activities in 1972, initially in the House of German Shorthand ("Stenohaus") on Luitpoldplatz, which had been built by the National Socialists. In October 1973, founding president Klaus Dieter Wolff took office. On 23 March 1974, the cornerstone was laid, and on 27 November 1975, Minister of Culture Hans Maier opened the University of Bayreuth with a state ceremony in the Margravial Opera House, with a focus on the natural sciences.

=== Since 1975 ===
It began research and teaching operations in the winter semester of 1975/76 with 637 students, 24 professors and one female professor. Initially, it offered diploma courses in biology and mathematics, as well as teaching positions for elementary and secondary schools and for grammar schools (mathematics, physics and physical education). The former University of Education was initially incorporated into the university as the Faculty of Education. In the winter semester of 1977/78, it was dissolved and the didactic subjects were integrated into the faculties of the respective disciplines. Elementary school teacher training was still offered in Bayreuth until 2005, in addition to diploma and master's degree courses and courses for teaching positions at secondary schools. The courses of study for teaching positions at Gymnasiums and Realschulen continued to be offered.

The first structure on the campus was the Geosciences I building west of the "Birkengut" farm, completed in 1975, initially used by the university, but demolished after a fire in 1994. In 1977, the Geosciences II building was added, and from 1980 to 1983, Natural Sciences II was built. In 1988, the university library, which until then had been housed in a temporary structure, was inaugurated and the foundation of the 8.6 million DM Humanities II building was concreted. On 5 January of that year, after four years of preparation, physicists Frank Pobell, Kurt Gloos and Peter Smeibidl succeeded in setting a new low temperature record. In October 1990, a cooperation agreement was signed with the Czechoslovak Pavol Jozef Šafárik University in Košice, and in November 1990, the university's combined heat and power plant went into operation. The DM 2.3 million plant was designed and built by Energieversorgung Oberfranken. In June 1991, Czechoslovak human rights activist and state president Václav Havel was awarded an honorary doctorate from the University of Bayreuth.

In 1994, the university administration was moved from Kanalstraße in the city center (former "Steno-Haus") to the campus. In the same year, the Auditorium Maximum with a capacity of 700 seats was completed, and in 1999 the building for the Faculty of Applied Natural Sciences (FAN), founded in 1998, was completed. In August 1996, Bayreuth became the first Bavarian university city to introduce the semester ticket.

When it began teaching in 1975, the university was designed for up to 8000 students in its final stage of expansion. In the winter semester 2014/15, the number of 13,000 was exceeded. The university responded to the continuous growth by expanding its staff and infrastructure. In 2018, the proportion of international students was 9%, and 11% in 2019. In September 2018, the Bavarian Minister of Science Marion Kiechle opened the Bavarian Center for Battery Technology (BayBatt) at the university.

== Organization ==
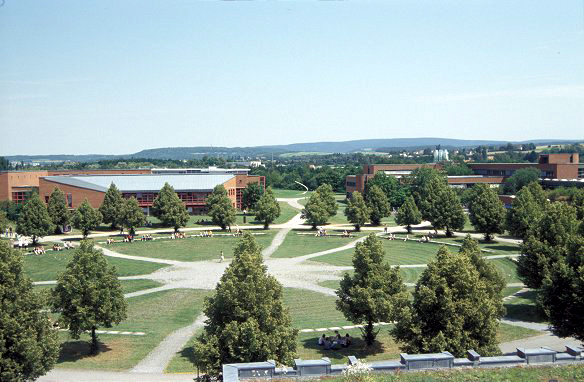
The campus of the University of Bayreuth

=== Faculties ===
The University of Bayreuth is divided into seven faculties:

- Mathematics, Physics and Computer Science
- Biology, Chemistry and Earth Sciences
- Law, Business and Economics
- Languages and Literature
- Cultural Studies
- Engineering Science
- Life Sciences: Food, Nutrition and Health (Campus Kulmbach)

=== University Administration Executive Board ===
| President | from | to |
|---|---|---|
| Klaus Dieter Wolff | 1973 | 1991 |
| Helmut Buettner | 1991 | 1997 |
| Helmut Ruppert | 1997 | 2009 |
| Rüdiger Bormann | 2009 | 2013 |
| Stefan Leible | 2013 | current |

The first chancellor was Wolf-Peter Hentschel from 1973 to Oktober 1999, who was already head of the executive office since 1 January 1972. From November 1999 to 2010 Ekkehard Beck served as chancellor, and from 2011 to 2020 Markus Zanner; his successor is Nicole Kaiser.

=== Library ===
The University library is divided into the following locations:

1. Central Library with integrated Departmental Library of the Social Sciences (GW)
2. Departmental Library of Law and Economics (RW)
3. Departmental Library of Biology/Chemistry (NW I)
4. Departmental Library of Mathematics/Physics/Informatics/Engineering Sciences (NW II)
5. Departmental Library of Earth Science (GEO)
6. Departmental Library of Research Institute of Music Theatre, Castle of Thurnau (FIMT)
7. Additional stack rooms at Geschwister-Scholl-Platz (GSP)

== Study programmes ==
The university has a capacity of approximately 10,000 students; in winter term 2011/12 the number of enrolled peaked at approximately 11,400 students due to the dual Abitur cohorts. Many study programmes use quasi-interdisciplinary approaches, i.e. "International Economy and Development", "Health Economics", "Sports Economics", "Polymer- and Colloidal Chemistry", "Geoecology", "Global Change Ecology" or "Applied Informatics".

== Research ==
Central Research Institutions

- Bavarian Center for Battery Technologies (BayBatt)
- Bavarian Research Institute of Experimental Geochemistry and Geophysics – BGI
- Bayreuth Centre for Colloids & Interfaces
- Bayreuth Institute of Macromolecular Research – BIMF
- Bayreuth Centre for Molecular Biosciences – BZMB
- Bayreuth Center of Ecology and Environmental Research – BayCEER
- Bayreuth Center for Stable Isotope Research in Ecology and Biogeochemistry (BayCenSI)
- North Bavarian NMR Centre (NBNC)
- Bayreuth Centre for Materials Science and Engineering – BayMAT
- Bayreuth Centre for High Performance Computing
- Bayreuth Lab of Digital Sciences (BayLDS)
- Research Center for Modeling and Simulation (MODUS)
- Institute for Entrepreneurship & Innovation (IEI)
- Institute of [HM1] African Studies (IAS)
- Institute of Music Theatre Research – FIMT
- Bayreuth Institute for American Studies – BIFAS
- Bayreuth Center of Sport Science (BaySpo)
- Centre for Educational Research and Teacher Education (ZLB)
- University of Bayreuth Centre of International Excellence „Alexander von Humboldt"
- University of Bayreuth Graduate School (UBTGS)

These interdisciplinary and cross-faculty research centres reflect the Focus Areas of the University of Bayreuth in education and research.

Excellence Strategy of the German Federal and State Governments

Cluster of Excellence "Africa Multiple"– EXC 2052

German Research Foundation (DFG) – Collaborative Research Centres

Collaborative Research Centre 1585 MultiTrans (from 1 Oct 2023)

Collaborative Research Centre 1357 Microplastics

Collaborative Research Centre/TRR 225 "From the fundamentals of biofabrication towards functional tissue models" (in collaboration with JMU Wuerzburg and FAU Erlangen-Nuremberg)

Previous Collaborative Research Centres

German Research Foundation (DFG) – Research Units

FOR 5495, SOURCED – Process Mining on Distributed Event Source

Promotion of Early Career Researchers

University of Bayreuth Graduate School (Central Research Institution) and WiN Academy

International Graduate School, funded by the Excellence Strategy

Bayreuth International School of African Studies (BIGSAS) (as part of the Cluster of Excellence "Africa Multiple" at the University of Bayreuth)

German Research Foundation (DFG) – Research Training Groups

IRTG 2818: "Optical excitations in organic and inorganic semiconductors: Understanding and control through external stimuli" (in cooperation with University of Melbourne and Monash University, Australia)

RTG 2156: "Deep Earth Volatile Cycles" (with Tōhoku University, Japan)

German Research Foundation (DFG) Priority Programmes, coordinated by the University of Bayreuth)

SPP 2370: "Interlinking catalysts, mechanisms and reactor concepts for the conversion of dinitrogen by electrocatalytic, photocatalytic and photoelectrocatalytic methods (‘Nitroconversion’)"

SPP 2006: "Priority Programme Compositionally Complex Alloys – High Entropy Alloys"

Research Bodies and Collaborative Research Projects

Collaborative projects in the research framework programme HORIZON 2020

Collaborative projects in the research framework programme Horizon Europe

Projects of the Federal Government

Projects of the VolkswagenStiftung

Bavarian Research Associations

Research Bodies in cooperation with external partners

Research Units

== Rankings ==
University rankings

Overall – Global & National
| QS World 2024 | 509 | 31 |
| THE World 2024 | 351–400 | 34–36 |
| ARWU World 2023 | 501–600 | 32–36 |

In the QS World University Rankings of 2024, the University of Bayreuth was placed at 509 globally, which put it at 31st among German universities. The Times Higher Education World University Rankings for 2024 ranked it within the 351–400 bracket internationally, and between 34–36 in the national comparison. In the Academic Ranking of World Universities, known as ARWU, for the year 2023, it was placed in the 501–600 range worldwide and 32–36 in Germany.

== Notable alumni ==
- Alice Weidel, Leader of Alternative für Deutschland (AfD) political party and member of the German Bundestag.
- Andreas Voßkuhle, President of the Federal Constitutional Court of Germany
- Mamadou Diawara, professor for ethnology, Goethe University Frankfurt and Deputy Director Frobenius Institute
- Hans Peter Hahn (ethnologist), professor for ethnology, Goethe University Frankfurt
- Damian Boeselager (* 1988), politician (co-founder of Volt), Member of the European Parliament (since 2019), B.A in Philosophy and Economics
- Auma Obama, Half-sister of U.S. President Barack Obama
- Eberhard Bodenschatz, Director of the Max Planck Institute for Dynamics and Self-Organization
- Thomas Hacker, Leader of the FDP in the Bavarian Parliament
- Ulrike Gote, Parliamentary secretary of the Greens in the Bavarian parliament
- Maximilian Müller, German hockey player
- Sabine Ludwigs, Professor of Chemistry at the University of Stuttgart

Karl-Theodor zu Guttenberg, German Federal Minister of Defence, was awarded a summa cum laude doctorate by the Faculty of Law, Business Administration and Economics in 2007. After extensive plagiarism in Guttenberg's dissertation was revealed in February 2011, German media also criticised the University of Bayreuth. A university spokesman denied allegations of bribery and political corruption. The university rescinded the doctorate and Guttenberg resigned. In 2019 Guttenberg was awarded a PhD for a new dissertation at the University of Southampton.

== Notable faculty ==
- Erdmute Alber (born 1963), Professor (Ethnology)
- Till Förster (born 1955), Professor (Ethnology, 1994–2001)
- Fouad Ibrahim (born 1938) Emeritus, Professor (Geography)
- Gerd Spittler (born 1939) Emeritus, Professor (Ethnology)

== Impressions ==
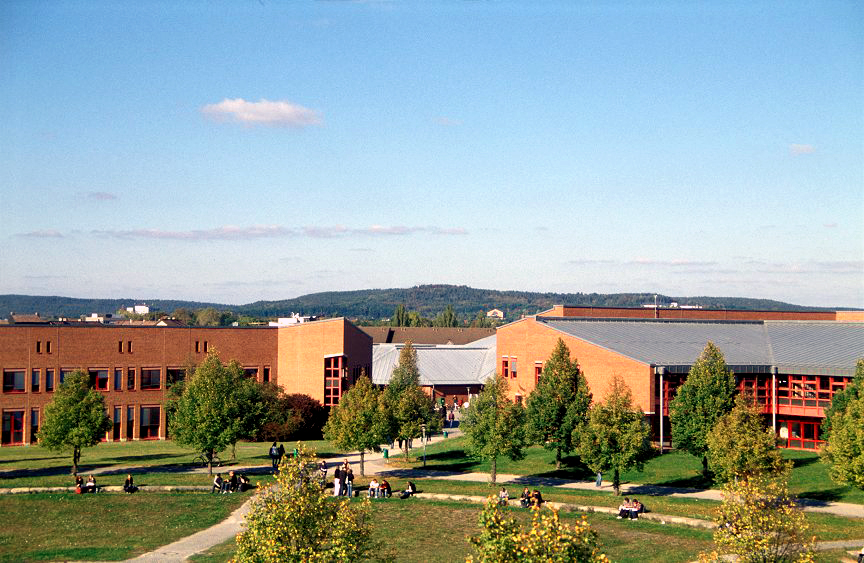
View of the central university campus

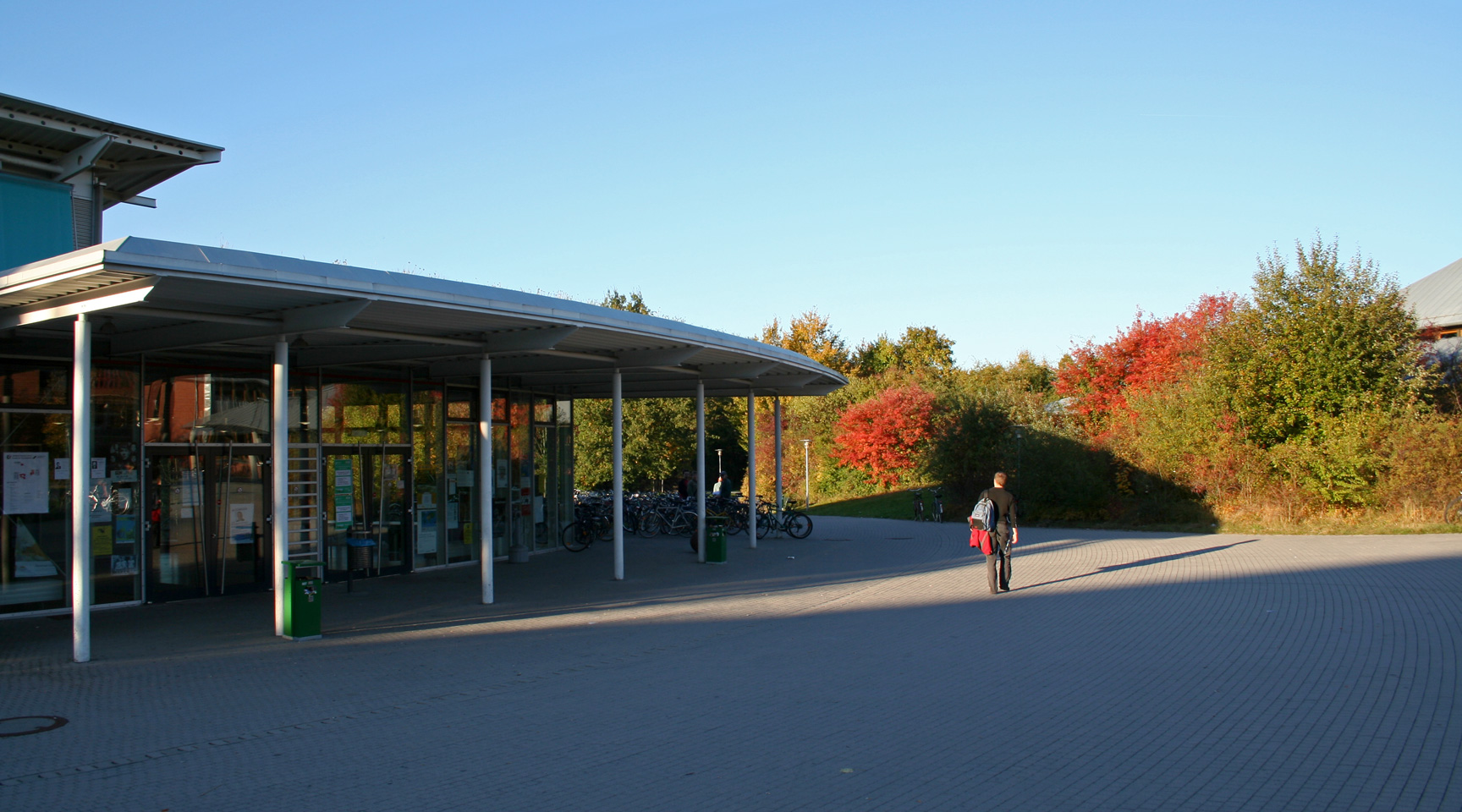
Auditorium Maximum

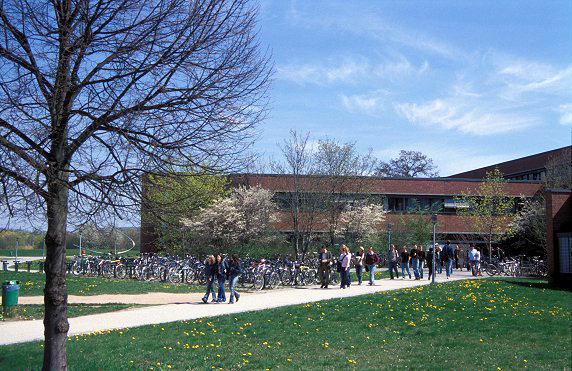
In front of the building of the Faculty of Law and Economics

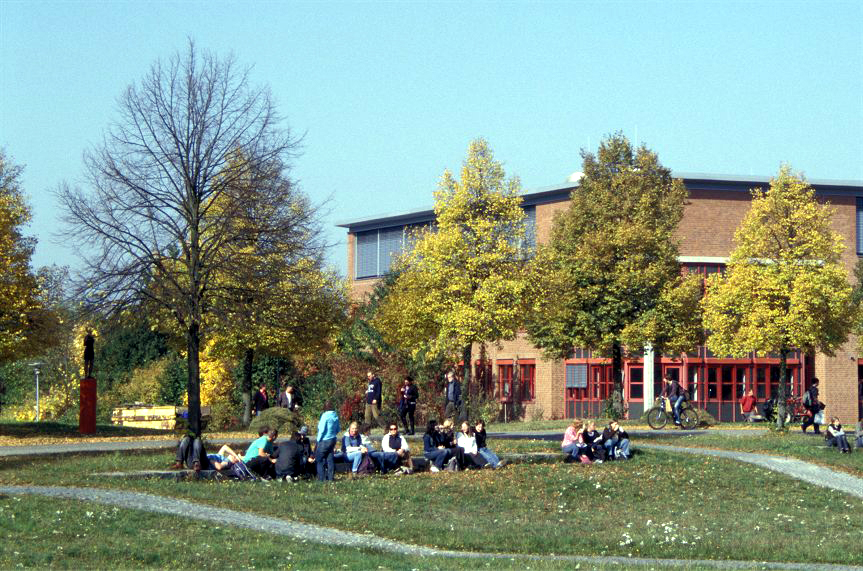
In front of the building "Geisteswissenschaften I"

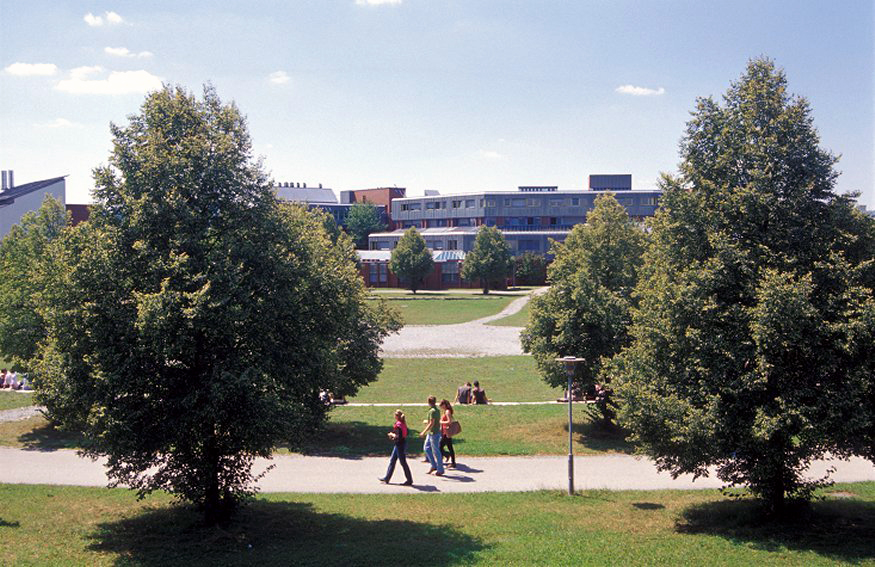
University Campus, Natural Sciences II building in the background

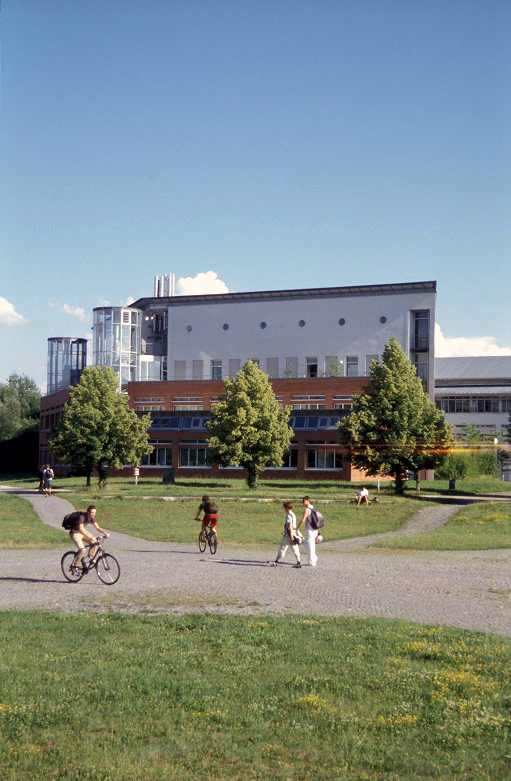
Bavarian Research Institute of Experimental Geochemistry and Geophysics

== See also ==
- Education in Germany
- List of universities in Germany
- Times Higher Education
