= List of Free University of Berlin people =

A list of Free University of Berlin people. Alumni and faculty of the Free University include many scientists, philosophers and politicians, amongst them five Nobel Prize winners and 19 Leibniz laureates.

== Prize winners ==
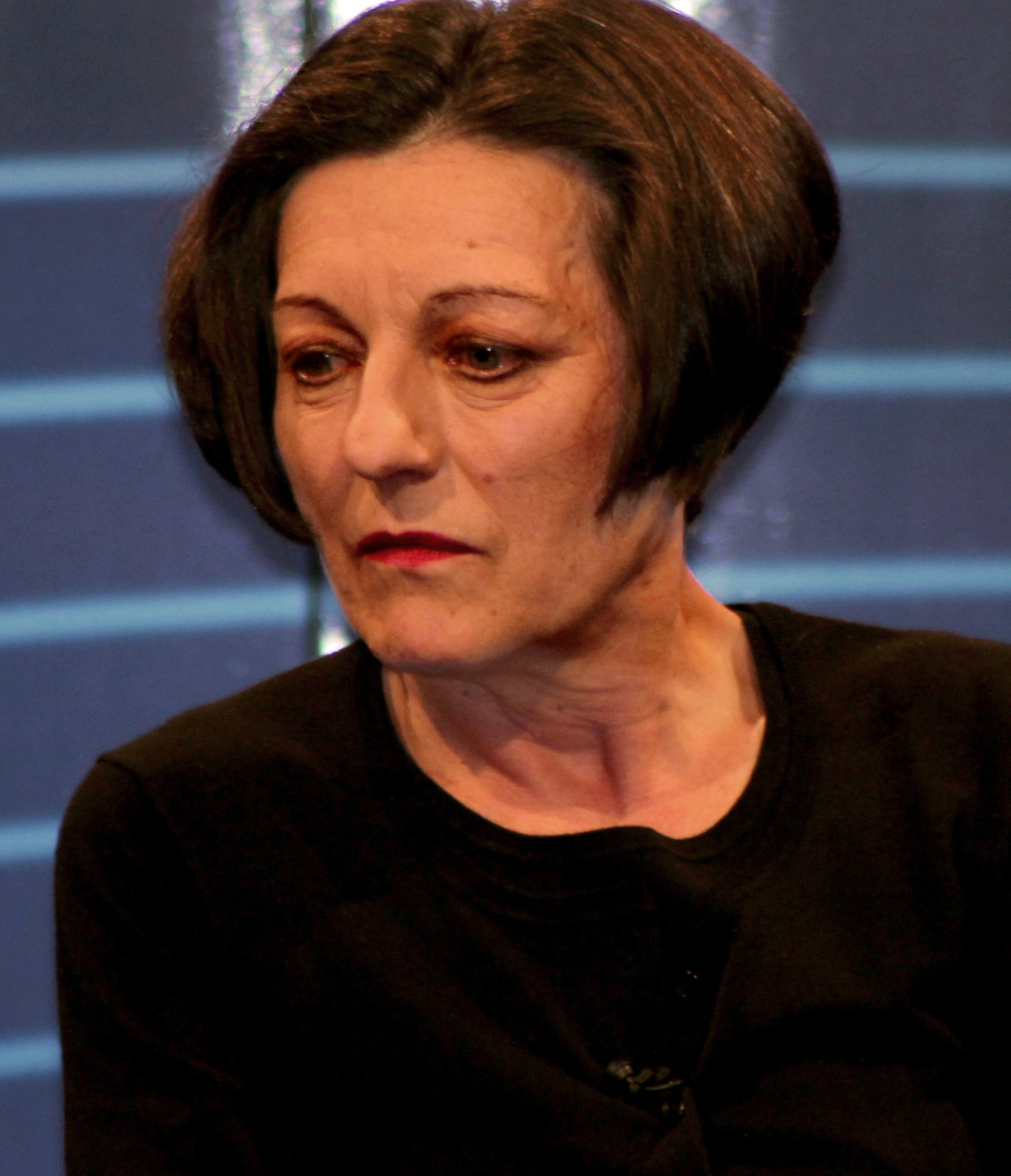
Herta Müller, novelist and Nobel Prize in Literature laureate

=== Nobel laureates ===
- Herta Müller, novelist and Nobel Prize in Literature (2009) (Professor)
- Gerhard Ertl, physicist and Nobel Prize in Chemistry (2007) (Professor)
- Reinhard Selten, economist and Nobel Memorial Prize in Economic Sciences (1994) (Professor)
- Ernst Ruska, physicist and Winner of Nobel Prize in Physics (1986) (Professor)
- Ulrich Cubasch, climate scientist and co-author of reports by the Intergovernmental Panel on Climate Change, which was awarded the Nobel Peace Prize in 2007(Professor)

=== Leibniz Prize winners ===
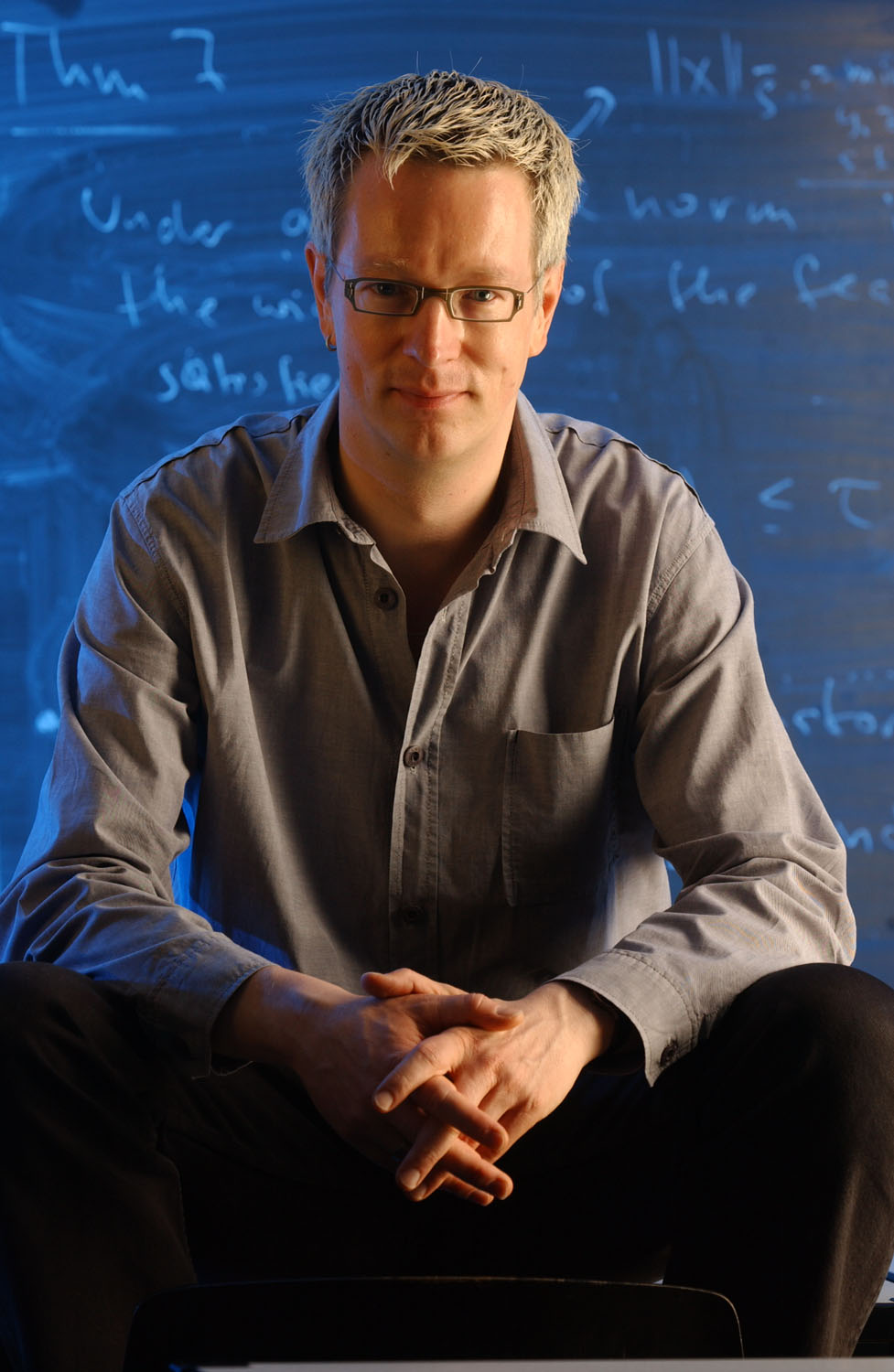
Günter M. Ziegler, Leibniz Prize-winning mathematician and president of the FUB

The DFG has awarded the Gottfried Wilhelm Leibniz Prize to outstanding German scientists every year since 1985. As the most acclaimed award for research achievements in Germany, it comes with a research grant of 2.5 million € to be used within seven years.

- Volker Erdmann, Biochemistry (1987)
- Wolfram Saenger, Crystallography (1987)
- Randolf Menzel, Neuroscience (1991), member of the German Academy of Sciences Leopoldina
- Irmela Hijiya-Kirschnereit, Japanese Studies (1992)
- Jürgen Kocka, History (1992)
- Johann Mulzer, Organic chemistry (1994)
- Peter Schaefer, Jewish Studies (1994)
- Emo Welzl, Computer science (1995)
- Onno Oncken, Geology (1998)
- Regine Hengge-Aronis, Microbiology (1998)
- Joachim Küpper, Romance studies (2001), member of the Leopoldina
- Günter M. Ziegler, Mathematics (2001), member of the Leopoldina, current president of the Free University of Berlin
- Hélène Esnault, Mathematics (2003)
- Rupert Klein, Mathematics (2003)
- Gerhard Huisken (2003)
- Gabriele Brandstetter, Theater studies (2004), member of the Leopoldina
- Gyburg Radke, Ancient Greek (2006), youngest ever person to receive the Leibniz prize
- Beatrice Gründler Arabic Studies (2016)
- Benjamin List, Organocatalysis (2016)
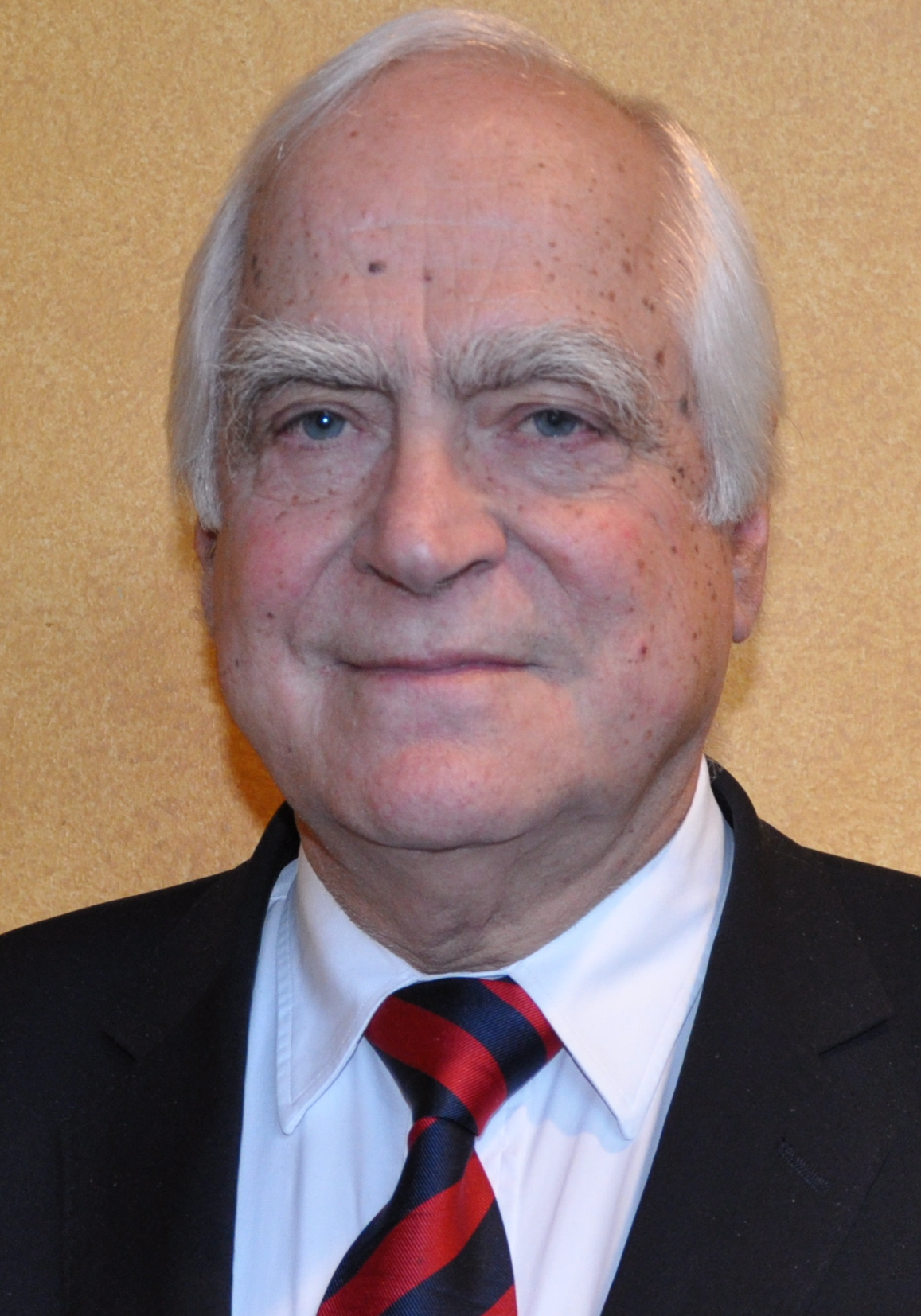
  Peter Eigen, founder of Transparency International

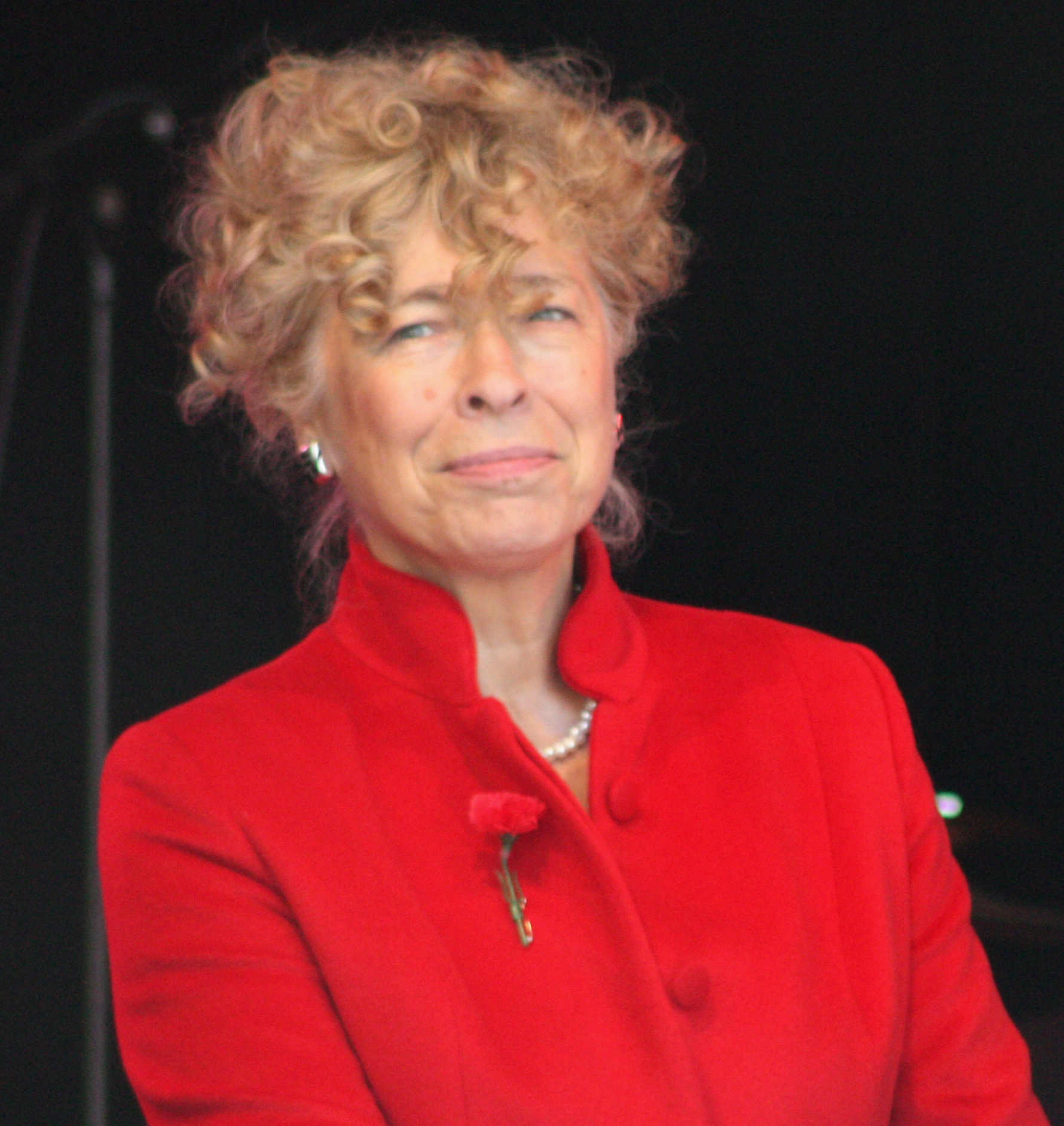
Gesine Schwan, political scientist and two-time Social Democratic Party of Germany candidate for German president

== Professors ==
- Johannes Agnoli, political scientist
- Arnulf Baring, historian and political scientist
- Peter Bieri, philosopher and writer
- Dieter Claessens, sociologist and anthropologist
- Cecilia Clementi, computational biophysicist
- Gordon A. Craig, historian and writer
- Konstantinos A. Dimadis, Greek scholar
- Peter Eigen, Founder of Transparency International
- Günter Faltin, economist
- Paul Feyerabend, philosopher
- Ernst Fraenkel, political scientist
- Wolfgang Fritz Haug, philosopher, founder of the journal Das Argument
- Reinhard Furrer, scientist and astronaut
- Roman Herzog, President of Germany (1994–1999)
- Monika Hilker, biologist
- Klaus Jacob, political scientist
- Hans Kauffmann, art historian
- Walther Killy, German literary scholar, Der Killy
- Herbert Marcuse, sociologist
- Yann Martel, writer
- Friedrich Meinecke, historian and founder of FUB
- Ernst Nolte, historian
- Renate Radek, protistologist
- Wolfgang Rautenberg, mathematician
- Stefan Rinke, historian
- Thomas Risse, political scientist
- Raúl Rojas, computer scientist
- Edith Schönert-Geiß, numismatist
- Gesine Schwan, political scientist and candidate for the 2004 German presidential election
- Péter Szondi, literary scholar
- Georges Tamer, Islamic studies scholar
- Jacob Taubes, sociologist of religion, philosopher, and scholar of Judaism
- Lorenz Weinrich, historian
- Heribert Dieter, Political Economist
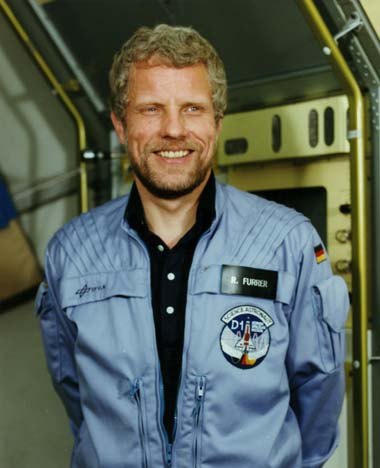
  Reinhard Furrer, physicist and astronaut

== Alumni ==
=== Politicians ===
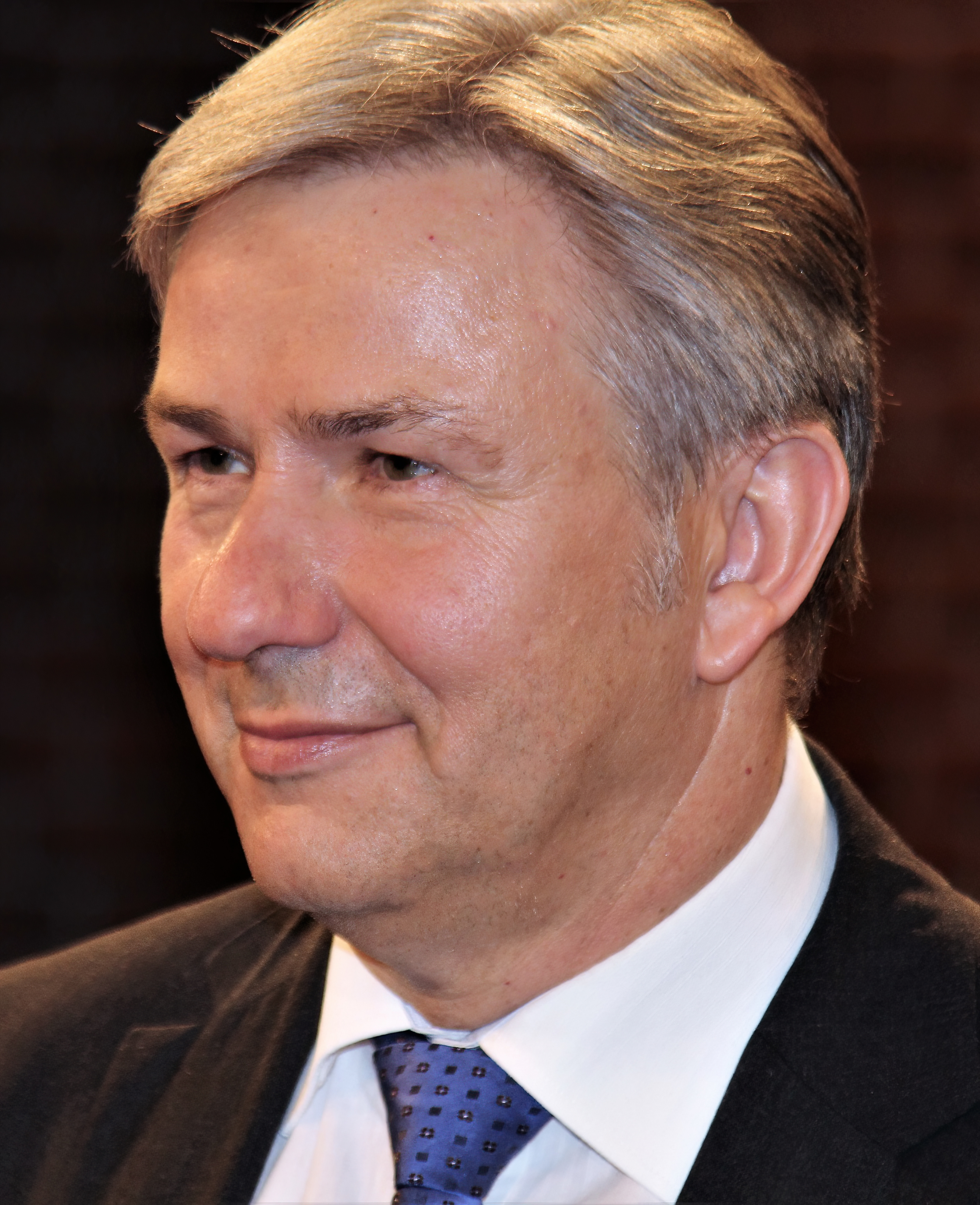
Klaus Wowereit, Governing Mayor of Berlin from 2001 to 2014

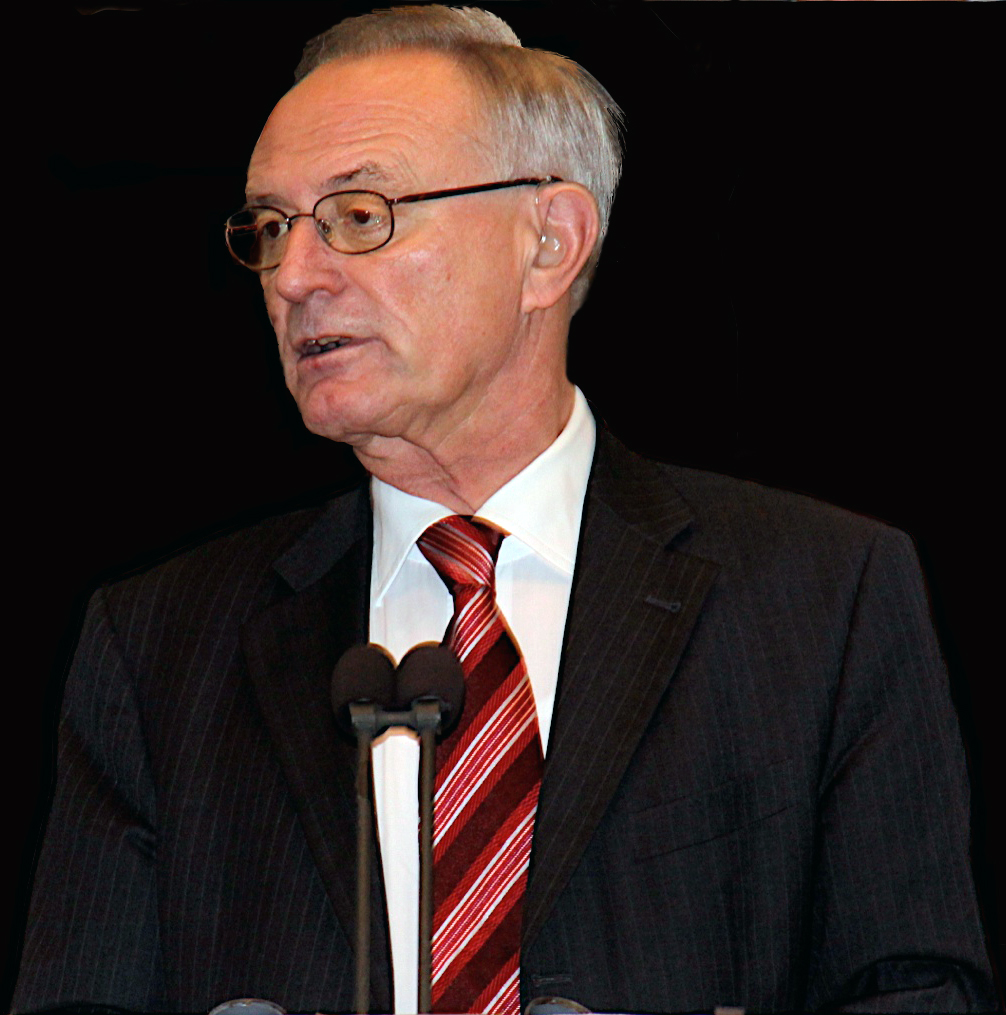
Klaus Hänsch, President of the European Parliament (1994–1997)

- Andrea Fischer, Federal Ministry of Health (1998–2001)
- Annette Groth, politician in the German Left Party
- Devendra Fadnavis, Chief Minister Of Maharashtra ( India ) , Bharatiya Janata Party
- Eberhard Diepgen, Mayor of (West) Berlin (1984–1989, 1991–2001)
- Fritz Teufel, political activist in the 1960s, founder of Kommune 1
- Günter Rexrodt, Economics Minister of Germany (1993–1998)
- Hans Eichel, Federal Ministry of Finance (1999–2005)
- Hans-Christian Ströbele, vice-leader of the German Green Party in the Bundestag
- Hans-Jürgen Papier, Federal Constitutional Court of Germany (2002–2010)
- Helga Zepp-LaRouche, German political activist, wife of American political activist Lyndon LaRouche
- Herta Däubler-Gmelin, Justice Minister of Germany (1998–2002)
- Ingeborg Gräßle, Member of the European Parliament
- Jan-Marco Luczak, politician and lawyer
- Jutta Limbach, President of the Federal Constitutional Court of Germany (1994–2002), President of Goethe-Instituts (2002–2008)
- Klaus Hänsch, President of the European Parliament (1994–1997)
- Klaus Uwe Benneter, German politician
- Mario Laserna Pinzón, Colombian politician
- Marion Caspers-Merk, politician
- Otto Schily, Federal Ministry of the Interior (1998–2005)
- Leon Schreiber, South African academic, author and politician
- Vassilios Skouris, President of the Court of Justice of the European Communities (since 2003)
- Walter Momper, Mayor of West Berlin (1989–1991)
- Florika Fink-Hooijer, prominent European civil servant
- Nora Schimming-Chase, Namibia's first ambassador to Germany

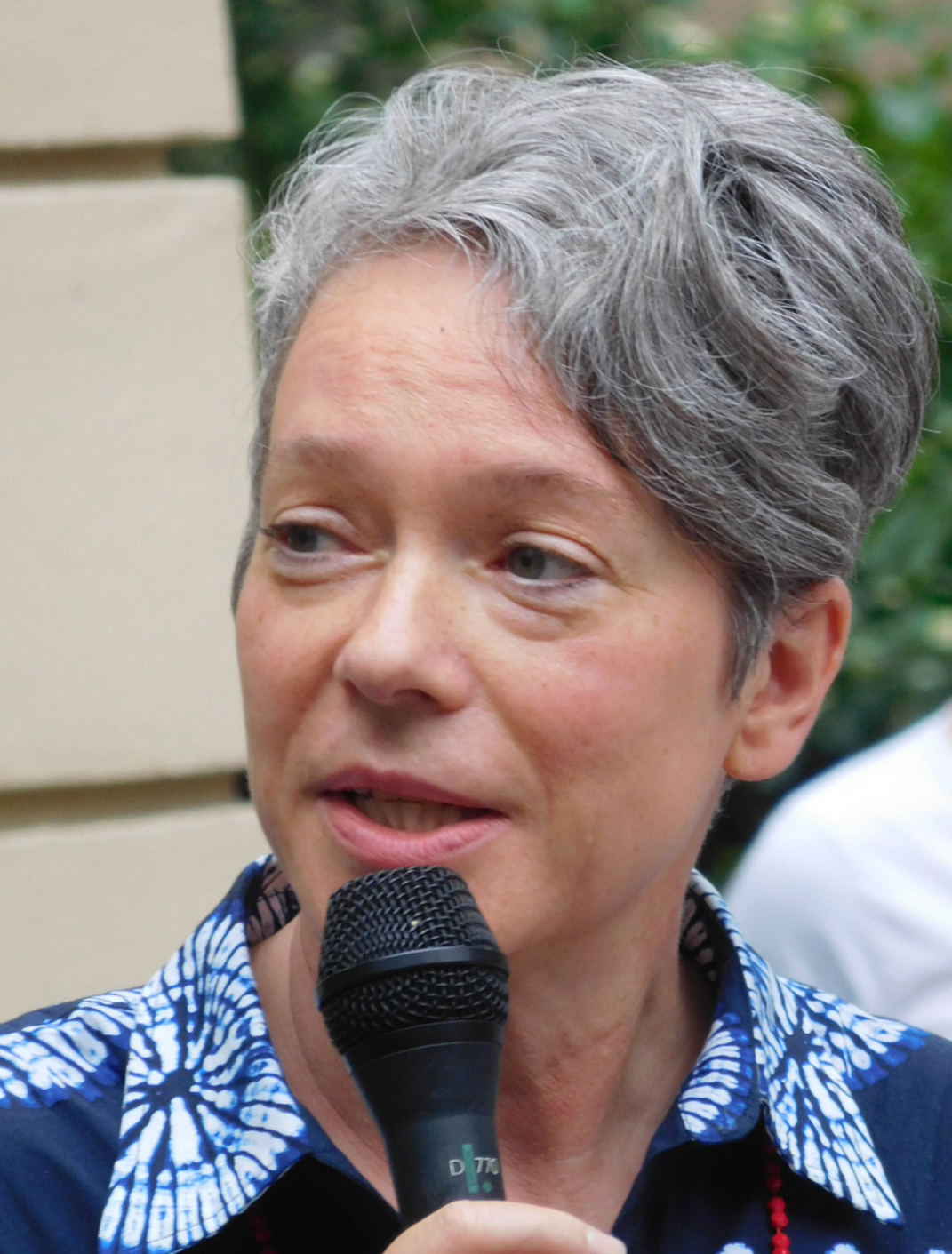
Ina Hartwig – writer, literature critic and Frankfurt city councillor responsible for culture and science

=== Others ===
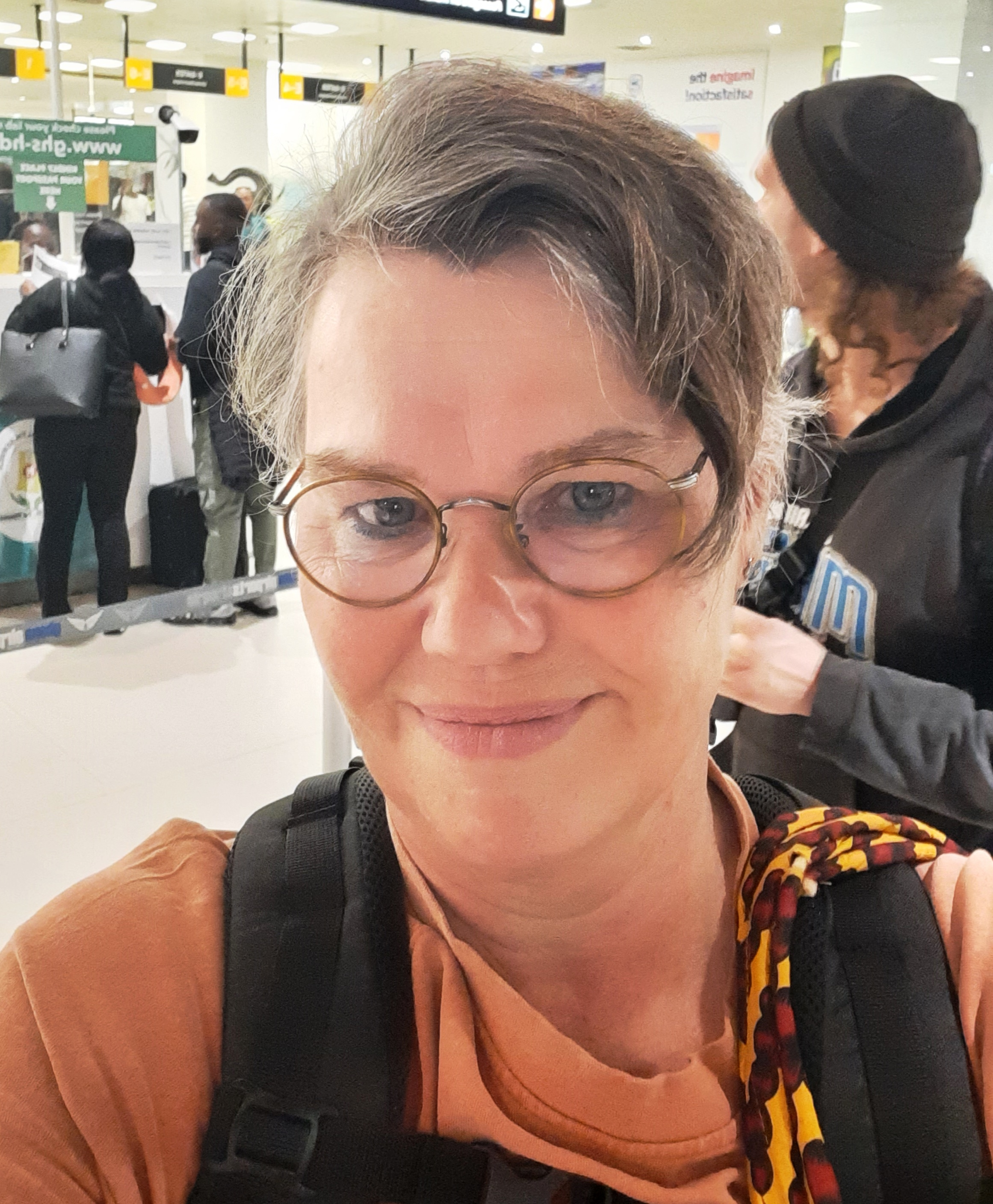
Erdmute Alber

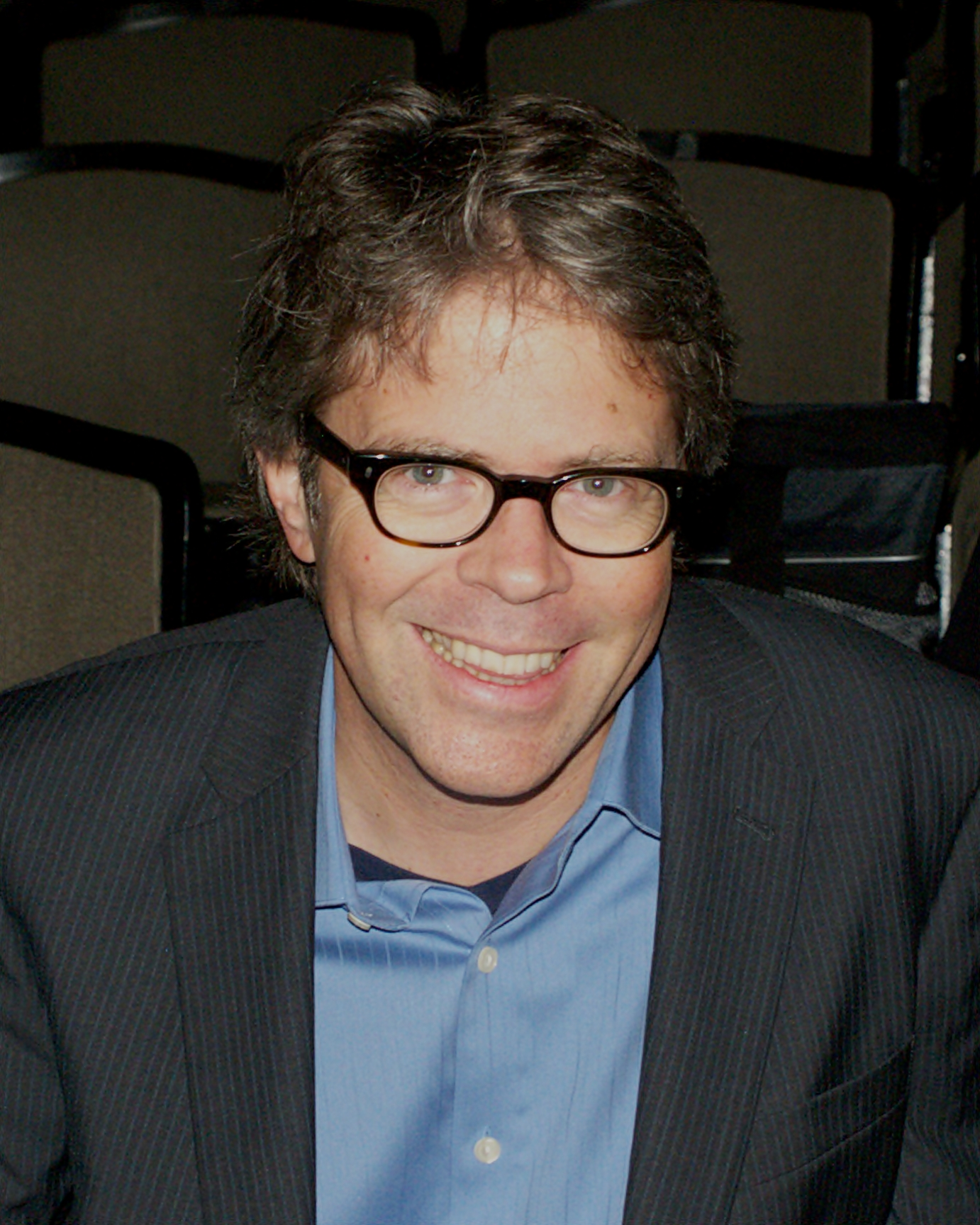
Jonathan Franzen, novelist, was an alumnus of FU Berlin

- Erdmute Alber, German sociologist, ethnologist, she receive her PhD, supervisor Georg Elwert
- Pedro Alcalde, Spanish composer
- F. W. Bernstein, poet, cartoonist, satirist and academic
- Thomas Bierschenk, German ethnologist and sociologist
- Volkmar Braunbehrens, German musicologist
- Reinhold Brinkmann, musicologist
- Christopher Clark, historian
- Lars Clausen, German sociologist
- Georg von Dadelsen, German musicologist, Neue Bach-Ausgabe
- Till Förster, German sociologist, ethnologist, he receive his PhD, supervisor Georg Elwert
- Regina Frank, German textile artist
- Jonathan Franzen, American writer
- Anna Funder, Australian writer, including of Stasiland (2002)
- Jeannette zu Fürstenberg, businesswoman
- Edwin Gentzler, American Germanist and translation scholar
- Elke Gryglewski (born 1965), German political scientist and historian
- Leonhard Harding, German historian and scholar in African studies
- Ina Hartwig, journalist, author, Kulturdezernentin of Frankfurt
- Roman Inderst, economist
- Parag Khanna, Indian American author and analyst in the field of international relations
- Walther Killy, German literary scholar, Der Killy
- Paul Alfred Kleinert, German writer, editor and translator
- Georg Klute, (born 1952), ethnologist, sociologist, Guest Professor FU-Berlin (2002–2003); Prof.em.Dr., University of Bayreuth
- Mario Kopić, Croatian philosopher and author
- Elmar Kraushaar, journalist and author
- Carola Lentz, (born 1954), German social anthropologist and president of the Goethe-Institut.
- Shoucheng Zhang, theoretical physicist
- Amity Shlaes, Senior fellow in economic history at the Council on Foreign Relations and syndicated columnist
- Wolfgang Schomburg, first German judge at the International Criminal Tribunal for the former Yugoslavia and at the International Criminal Tribunal for Rwanda
- Wolfgang Becker, German film director and writer
- Markus Büchler, surgeon and physician
- Götz Aly, journalist, sociologist and historian
- Peter Loewenberg, historian, psychologist and professor at UCLA
- Stefan Heidemann, orientalist
- Jacques de Caso, American historian
- Moain Sadeq, Palestinian archaeologist, he received his PhD at FU Berlin
- Frank W. Stahnisch, historian
- Hamdan Taha, Palestinian archaeologist, he received his PhD at FU Berlin
- Gregor Thum, historian
- Michael Stürmer, historian
- Carsten Niemitz, anatomist and ethologist
- José María Pérez Gay, information scientist
- Julian Voss-Andreae, sculptor and physicist
- Bertram Gawronski, social psychologist
- Michael Roes, writer and filmmaker
- Hartmut Zinser, scholar in the field of religious studies and ethnology
- Gudrun Ensslin, terrorist
- David Madden (Jeopardy! contestant), Jeopardy! contestant and art historian
- Horst Mahler, political activist
- Baby Varghese, Indian church historian and scholar
- Jón Bjarki Magnússon, Icelandic journalist and filmmaker
- Katja Werthmann, ethnologist
- Carolina Müller-Möhl, businesswoman, philanthropist and activist
- Shaheen Dill-Riaz, Bangladeshi-Garman documentary filmmaker
- Katja Urbatsch, CEO and co-founder of the non-profit organization ArbeiterKind.de

== Honorary degrees ==
During its history, Free University has awarded various people with an honorary degree, amongst them:

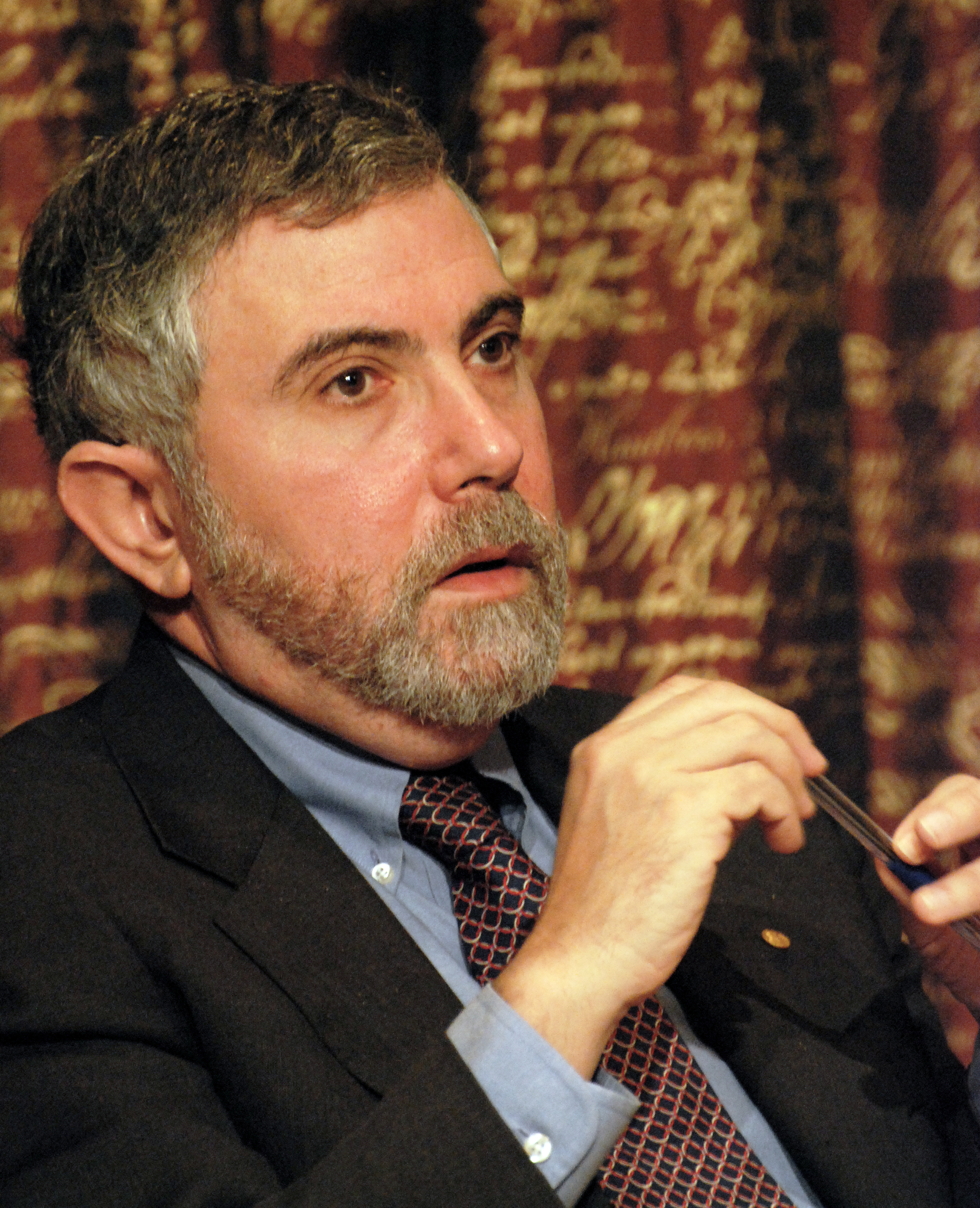
Paul Krugman, economist, holds an FU Berlin honorary degree

- 1949: Ernst Reuter – mayor of West Berlin from 1948 to 1953
- 1949: Theodor Heuss – first President of the Federal Republic of Germany from 1949 to 1959 (by the Department of Philosophy)
- 1956: Lise Meitner – physicist, co-discoverer of nuclear fission (by the Department of Physics)
- 1963: Walter Gropius – architect and founder of the Bauhaus School (by the Department of Philosophy)
- 1964: Robert F. Kennedy – American politician from the Kennedy family who served as Attorney General (by the Department of Philosophy)
- 1998: Paul Krugman – American Nobel Prize-winning economist (by the JFK Institute for North American Studies)
- 1999: Bronislaw Geremek – Polish social historian and politician (by the Otto Suhr Institute)
- 1999: Salman Rushdie – British Indian novelist and essayist (by the Department of Philosophy and Humanities)
- 2001: Kofi Annan – Ghanaian diplomat who served as the seventh Secretary-General of the United Nations (by the Department of Political and Social Sciences)
- 2005: Günter Grass – Nobel Prize-winning writer (by the Department of Philosophy and Humanities)
- 2005: Imre Kertész – Hungarian Nobel Prize-winning writer (by the Department of Philosophy and Humanities)
- 2006: Marcel Reich-Ranicki – Polish-born German literary critic and member of the literary group Gruppe 47 (by the Department of Philosophy and Humanities)
- 2006: Theodor W. Hänsch – Nobel Prize-winning physicist (by the Department of Physics)
- 2007: Orhan Pamuk – Turkish Nobel Prize-winning writer (by the Department of Philosophy and Humanities)
- 2008: Cees Nooteboom – Dutch novelist, poet, and journalist (by the Department of Philosophy and Humanities)
- 2010: Ed Diener – American psychologist (by the Department of Education and Psychology)
- 2010: Jagdish Bhagwati – Indian-born American economist (by the School of Business and Economics)
- 2012: Homi K. Bhabha – Indian-English scholar and critical theorist (by the Department of Philosophy and Humanities)
- 2010: George M. Whitesides – American chemist (by the Department of Biology, Chemistry, Pharmacy)
