= Volker Braun =

German writer (born 1939)

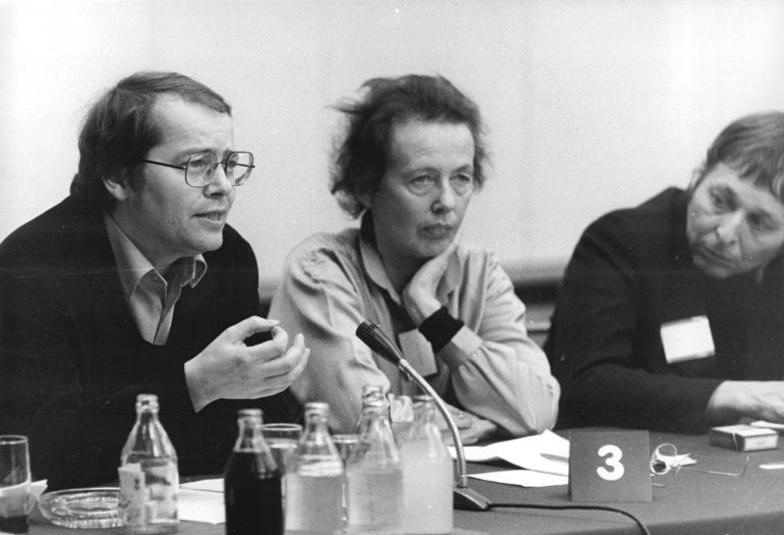
- Volker Braun (left), alongside Ruth Berghaus (center) and Wieland Förster in Berlin 1981. The image was taken by the Signum photographer Peter Heinz Junge and is deposited in the German Federal Archives
- Born: May 7, 1939 (age 87); Dresden, Gau Saxony, German Reich
- Education: Leipzig University
- Occupation: Writer
- Writing career
- Language: German
- Notable work: The Property
- Notable awards: National Prize of the German Democratic Republic; Schiller Memorial Prize; Georg Büchner Prize
- Movement: Marxism
- Political party: SED

Volker Braun (born 7 May 1939 in Dresden) is a German writer. His works include Provokation für mich (Provocation for me) – a collection of poems written between 1959 and 1964 and published in 1965, a play, Die Kipper (The Dumpers) (1972; written 1962–1965), and Das ungezwungene Leben Kasts (The Unrestrained Life of Kast) (1972).

== Life ==
After completing his Abitur, Volker Braun worked for a time in construction before going on to study philosophy at Leipzig. There he occupied himself with the contradictions and hopes of a socialist state. He joined the SED in 1960. Nevertheless, he was regarded as critical of the GDR state, and often succeeded in getting his prose and poetry published only through the application of tactical skill.

His work included poetry, plays, novels and short stories.

At first his writings reflected a critical enthusiasm for the building of socialism. From 1965 to 1967, Braun worked as artistic director at the Berliner Ensemble at the invitation of Helene Weigel. After the events of the Prague Spring, he became increasingly critical of life and the possibility for reform under Socialism. After that, he came under more intense scrutiny of the Stasi. In 1972 Braun began work at the Deutsches Theater Berlin (German Theatre Berlin). In 1976 he was among those who signed the petition protesting the expatriation of Wolf Biermann. From 1979 he was active again in the Berliner Ensemble. He received the Lessing Prize of East Germany in 1981. and the National Prize of East Germany in 1988.

In 1982 Braun left the Writers’ Union of the GDR. At that time his works described an increasingly depressing life in the GDR. The actors in his plays moved about with resignation in immovable settings. His Hinze-Kunze-Roman, based on Diderot's Jacques le fataliste et son maître, received approval for publication in 1985. When it appeared it was reviewed as “absurd” and “anarchistic” by the influential critic Annalise Loeffler. Klaus Hoepke, then deputy minister for culture, was disciplined for having granted permission for its publication.

In 1988, Braun received the National Prize of the GDR. During the Peaceful Revolution of 1989, he was a supporter of an independent "third way" for the GDR. He was among the first signatories of the appeal Für unser Land. After reunification, he became critically engaged in analysing the reasons for the collapse of the GDR. In this connection, he undertook work with the West German Marxist journal, Das Argument, edited by Wolfgang Fritz Haug.

In 1986, Braun was awarded the Bremer Literature Prize. In 1992 he received the Schiller Memorial Prize. He was awarded a stipend at the Villa Massimo and was a guest of the University of Wales in 1994. In 1996, he received the Deutschen Kritikerpreis (German Critic Prize), became a member of the Deutsche Akademie für Sprache und Dichtung, the Sächsische Akademie der Künste (Saxon Academy of the Arts) and held the post of Poet-lecturer at the University of Heidelberg. He received the Erwin Strittmatter Prize in 1998 and the Georg Büchner Prize in 2000. From 1999 to 2000, he was the Brothers Grimm-professor at the University of Kassel. He would be elected Director of the Literature Section of the Academy of Arts, Berlin in 2006. In 2008, he received the 2007 ver.di-Literature Prize 2007 for his story, "Das Mittagsmahl" (Lunch).

Volker Braun lives in Berlin.

== Selected works ==
- Die Kipper (The Dumpers), Drama (1965)
- Provokation für mich (Provocation for Me), Poem (1965)
- Vorläufiges (Provisional), Poem (1966)
- Kriegs Erklärung (War's Declaration) (1967)
- Lenins Tod (Lenin's Death), Drama (1970)
- Wir und nicht sie (We and not They), Poem (1970)
- Die Kipper (The Dumpers), Drama (1972)
- Gedichte (Poems) (1972)
- Gegen die symmetrische Welt (Against the Symmetric World), Poem (1974)
- Es genügt nicht die einfache Wahrheit (The Simple Truth isn't Enough) (1975)
- Unvollendete Geschichte (Unfinished History) (1977)
- Training des aufrechten Gangs (Learning to Walk Upright), Poem (1979)
- Hinze-Kunze-Roman (The Hinze-Kunze-Novel), Novel (1985)
- Verheerende Folgen mangelnden Anscheins innerbetrieblicher Demokratie. Schriften (Disastrous Consequences of the Missing Semblance of Internal Democracy. Writings) (1988)
- Das Eigentum (1990) - translated into English as The Property by Michael Hofmann
- Der große Frieden (The Great Peace)
- Der Wendehals (The Turncoat) (1995)
- Lustgarten Preußen (The Pleasure Garden of Prussia) (1996)
- Wir befinden uns soweit wohl. Wir sind erst einmal am Ende (So Far, So Good. We are Almost at the End.) (1998)
- Tumulus, Poetry Collection (1999)
- Das Wirklichgewollte (That Which is Really Wanted) (2000)
- Das unbesetzte Gebiet (The Unoccupied Area), Historical Story (2004)
- Das Mittagsmahl (Lunch), Story (2007)

== Literature ==
- Edition Text and Criticism: Volker Braun, 1977
- Jay Rosellini, Volker Braun, 1983
- Christine Cosentino, Wolfgang Ertl: Zur Lyrik Volker Brauns (To the Poet Volker Braun), 1984
- Katrin Bothe: Die imaginierte Natur des Sozialismus. Eine Biographie des Schreibens und der Texte Volker Brauns 1959–1974 (The Imaginative Nature of the Socialist. A Biography of the Writings and Texts of Volker Braun 1959–1974), Würzburg 1997
- Fritz J. Raddatz: Broken Lives (German). Die Zeit, 44/2000
- Rolf Jucker (Hg.): Volker Braun in perspective, Amsterdam/New York, 2004
- Schepers, Hannah. Volker Braun: Leben und Schreiben in der DDR, Halle(Saale): Mitteldeutscher Verlag, 2015.

== Film ==
- "Zur Person: Volker Braun" (To the Person: Volker Braun), Reportage, 50 Min., Author: Günter Gaus (1991)
