= Georg Elwert =

German ethnologist and sociologist

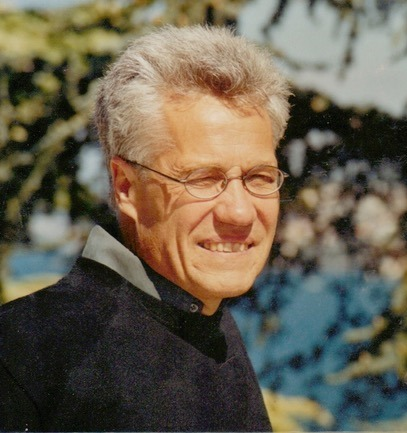
- Georg Elwert, 2004
- Born: 1 June 1947; Munich, Germany
- Died: 31 March 2005 (aged 57); Berlin, Germany
- Title: Prof. Dr.
- Spouse: Karola Elwert
- Children: Felix and Sarah

Academic background
- Education: Heidelberg University; Bielefeld University
- Doctoral advisor: Richard Thurnwald

Academic work
- Discipline: Anthropology; Ethnology; Sociology
- Institutions: University of Mainz; University of Heidelberg; Free University of Berlin

Georg Elwert (born 1 June 1947 in Munich; died 31 March 2005 in Berlin) was a German ethnologist and sociologist who was one of the leading exponents of German development sociology.

== Career and focus of work ==
Elwert studied ethnology and sociology at the University of Mainz and the Heidelberg University, where he received his doctorate in 1973. From the beginning he linked sociology with ethnology in the tradition of de:Lorenz Löffler, Richard Thurnwald and Wilhelm Emil Mühlmann. In 1980 he habilitated at Bielefeld University, taught there as assistant professor and then at the École des Hautes Études en Sciences Sociales in Paris and at Yale University in New Haven. Since 1985 he has been a professor of ethnology and social anthropology at the Free University of Berlin. Elwert was admitted to the Académie des sciences d'outre-mer, in Paris, as an associate member in 2004.

In his work on development cooperation, Elwert criticized the common reference to mere cultural differences, which obscures deeper socio-economic and political inequalities. In later works he dealt with corruption in post-colonial states and developed the concept of the commando state. From his preoccupation with ethnicity and ethnic conflicts, the analysis of violent conflicts developed into a broad new field of work with close links to the sociology of conflict, whereby he coined the term “markets of violence” (Gewaltmärkte). As a member of the Bielefeld development sociologists working group, Elwert made a significant contribution to the so-called "Bielefeld approach", which was trend-setting for German development sociology at the time. In 1993 Elwert was co-founder of the Berlin-Brandenburg Academy of Sciences and Humanities, three years later he became the editor in chief of the renowned journal Sociologus.

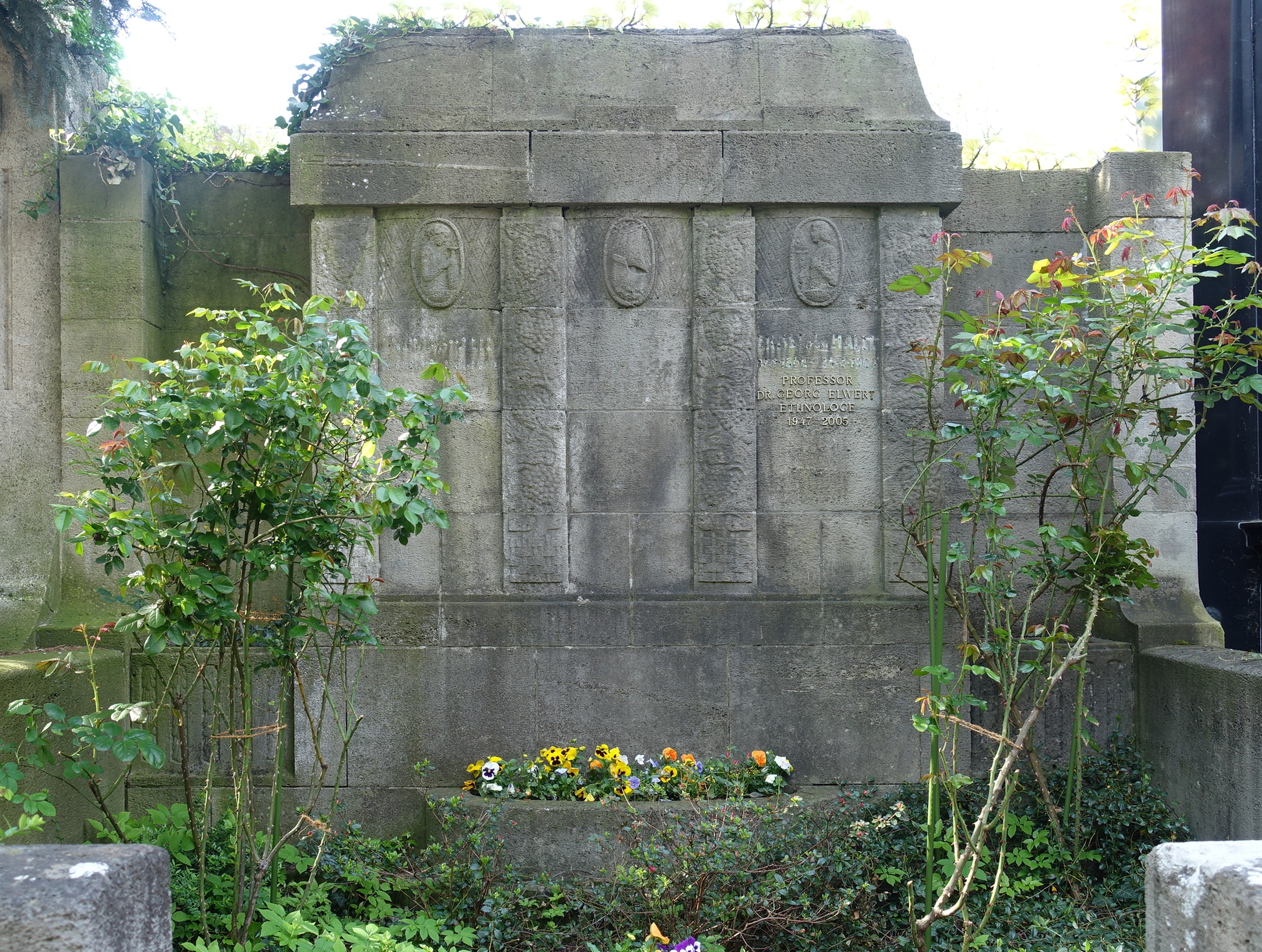
Elwert's grave, Grunewald Cemetery, Berlin

== Publications (selection) ==
- Dissertation: Wirtschaft und Herrschaft von 'Dãxomε' (Dahomey) im 18. Jahrhundert. Ökonomie d. Sklavenraubs u. Gesellschaftsstruktur 1724–1818; verbunden mit Untersuchungen über Verwendung und Bestimmung der Begriffe Klasse, Macht und Religion in diesem Kontext. Renner, Munich 1973.
- As editor with Roland Fett: Afrika zwischen Subsistenzökonomie und Imperialismus. Campus, Frankfurt am Main 1982, ISBN 3-593-32842-9.
- Professorial dissertation: Bauern und Staat in Westafrika. Die Verflechtung sozioökonomischer Sektoren am Beispiel Bénin. Campus, Frankfurt am Main 1983, ISBN 3-593-33206-X.
- As editor: Im Lauf der Zeit. Ethnographische Studien zur gesellschaftlichen Konstruktion von Lebensaltern. Breitenbach, Saarbrücken; Fort Lauderdale 1990, ISBN 3-88156-469-1.
- As editor: Dynamics of violence. Processes of escalation and de-escalation in violent group conflicts. Duncker und Humblot, Berlin 1999, ISBN 3-428-09957-5.
- Field research. Orientation knowledge and cross-perspective analysis. Schiller, Berlin 2003, ISBN 3-89930-092-0.

== Literature ==
- Julia M. Eckert (ed.): Anthropology of Conflicts. Georg Elwert's theses on conflict theory under discussion. Transcript, Bielefeld 2004, ISBN 3-89942-271-6.
