= Wilhelm Emil Mühlmann =

German ethnologist

- Born: 1 October 1904; Düsseldorf, Germany
- Died: 1 May 1988 (aged 83); Wiesbaden, Germany

Academic background
- Education: Friedrich Wilhelm University of Berlin
- Doctoral advisor: Richard Thurnwald

Academic work
- Discipline: Anthropology; Ethnology; Sociology
- Institutions: University of Mainz; Heidelberg University

Wilhelm Emil Mühlmann (1 October 1904 – 11 May 1988) was a German ethnologist who served as Professor of Ethnology at the University of Mainz and Chair of Ethnology at Heidelberg University.

== Biography ==
Wilhelm Emil Mühlmann was born in Düsseldorf, Germany on 1 October 1904. He gained his abitur in Düsseldorf in 1925. Mühlmann subsequently studied anthropology, ethnology and sociology at the University of Freiburg, the Ludwig-Maximilians-Universität München, the University of Hamburg, and the Friedrich Wilhelm University of Berlin. Among his teachers were Eugen Fischer at the University of Freiburg. Eugen Fischer, Edmund Husserl, Fritz Lenz, Siegfried Passarge, Walter Scheidt and Richard Thurnwald. Mühlmann gained his Ph.D. at the Friedrich Wilhelm University of Berlin in 1927 under Thurnwald. His thesis examined secret societies among the Polynesians. Mühlmann subsequently became editor of the journal Sociologus.

From 1934 to 1936, Mühlmann worked as an assistant at the Museum am Rothenbaum. He attempted his habilitation at Hamburg in 1935-1936, but failed due to "political unreliability". From 1937 to 1938 he worked at the University of Breslau under Egon Freiherr von Eickstedt. Having joined the Nazi Party, Mühlmann completed his habilitation at the Kaiser Wilhelm Society in 1938. He subsequently worked as a private lecturer in ethnology. From 1937 to 1943, Mühlmann was editor of the journal Archiv für Anthropologie und Völkerforschung.

At the end of World War II, Mühlmann fled from Berlin to Wiesbaden with his wife. He served as an expert witness during the denazification trial of Hans F. K. Günther. In 1946, Mühlmann rejoined the re-established German Sociological Association. From 1950 to 1960 he was Professor at the Institute for Ethnology and African Studies at the University of Mainz. Mühlmann edited the journal Homo from 1956 unto his death. In 1960, Mühlmann was appointed Chair of Ethnology at Heidelberg University, where he established an institute for sociology and ethnology. Having been exposed as a former Nazi Party member, Mühlmann retired from Heidelberg University in 1970. He died in Wiesbaden, Germany on 11 May 1988.

== Selected works ==
- Die geheime Gesellschaft der Arioi: eine Studie über polynesische Geheimbünde, mit besonderer Berücksichtigung der Siebungs- und Auslesevorgänge in Alt-Tahiti. Berlin, 1932.
- Rassen- und Völkerkunde: Lebensprobleme der Rassen, Gesellschaften und Völker. Braunschweig, 1936
- Methodik der Völkerkunde, 1938
- Krieg und Frieden. Winter, Heidelberg 1940 (Kulturgeschichtliche Bibliothek 2 N.F.)
- Assimilation, Umvolkung, Volkwerdung. Ein globaler Überblick und ein Programm, Stuttgart 1944
- Die Völker der Erde, Berlin 1944
- Die Idee einer zusammenfassenden Anthropologie. In: Karl Gustav Specht (Hrsg.): Soziologische Forschung in unserer Zeit. Ein Sammelwerk. Leopold von Wiese zum 75. Geburtstag. Köln/Opladen 1951, S. 83–93
- Chiliasmus und Nativismus, [o. O.], 1961
- Homo Creator. Abhandlungen zur Soziologie, Anthropologie und Ethnologie. O. Harrassowitz, Wiesbaden, 1962.
- Rassen, Ethnien, Kulturen. Moderne Ethnologie. Neuwied/Berlin 1964
- Geschichte der Anthropologie, 1968
- Die Metamorphose der Frau. Weiblicher Schamanismus und Dichtung, Berlin 1981

== Sources ==
- Hans Fischer: Völkerkunde im Nationalsozialismus. Aspekte der Anpassung, Affinität und Behauptung einer wissenschaftlichen Disziplin. Reimer, Berlin u. a. 1990, ISBN 3-496-00387-1 (Hamburger Beiträge zur Wissenschaftsgeschichte 7).
- Frank-Rutger Hausmann: Der „Kriegseinsatz“ der Deutschen Geisteswissenschaften im Zweiten Weltkrieg (1940-1945). In: Winfried Schulze, Otto Gerhard Oexle (Hrsg.): Deutsche Historiker im Nationalsozialismus. Fischer-Taschenbuch-Verlag, Frankfurt am Main 1999, ISBN 3-596-14606-2 (Fischer 146069; Die Zeit des Nationalsozialismus), S. 63–86.
- Siegfried Jäger: Kritische Diskursanalyse. Eine Einführung. 3. gegenüber der 2. überarbeiteten und erweiterten Auflage. Unveränderte Auflage. Duisburger Institut für Sprach- und Sozialforschung, Duisburg 2001, ISBN 3-927388-40-8 (DISS-Studien).
- Dirk Kaesler (1997). "Mühlmann, Wilhelm Emil". Neue Deutsche Biographie (in German). Vol. 18. Berlin: Duncker & Humblot. pp. 292–293. (full text online).
- René König: Soziologie in Deutschland. Begründer, Verfechter, Verächter. Hanser, München u. a. 1987, ISBN 3-446-14888-4.
- Ute Michel: Wilhelm Emil Mühlmann (1904–1988). Ein deutscher Professor. Amnesie und Amnestie. Zum Verhältnis von Ethnologie und Politik im Nationalsozialismus. In: Jahrbuch für Soziologiegeschichte 1991, ISSN 0939-6152, S. 69–119.
- Ernst Wilhelm Müller: Wilhelm Emil Mühlmann. In: Zeitschrift für Ethnologie. Band 114, 1989, S. 1–15.
- Fritz K. Ringer: Die Gelehrten. Der Niedergang der deutschen Mandarine 1890–1933. Klett-Cotta, Stuttgart 1983, ISBN 3-12-912030-0.
- Hellmut Seier: Die nationalsozialistische Wissenschaftspolitik und das Problem der Hochschulmodernisierung. In: Walter Kertz (Hrsg.): Hochschule und Nationalsozialismus. Universitäts-Bibliothek, Braunschweig 1994, ISBN 3-927115-19-3 (Projektberichte zur Geschichte der Carolo-Wilhelmina 9; Referate beim Workshop zur Geschichte der Carolo-Wilhelmina am 5. und 6. Juli 1993), S. 55–67.
- George Steinmetz: Neo-Bourdieusian Theory and the Question of Scientific Autonomy: German Sociologists and Empire, 1890s–1940s. In: Political Power and Social Theory, Bd. 20 2009, S. 71–131.
