= Klaus Jacob =

Klaus Jacob may refer to:

- Klaus Jacob (rower) (born 1943), German rower
- Klaus Jacob (political scientist) (born 1967), German political scientist

== See also ==
- Klaus Jacobs, German-born businessman
