= Erdmute Alber =

German professor

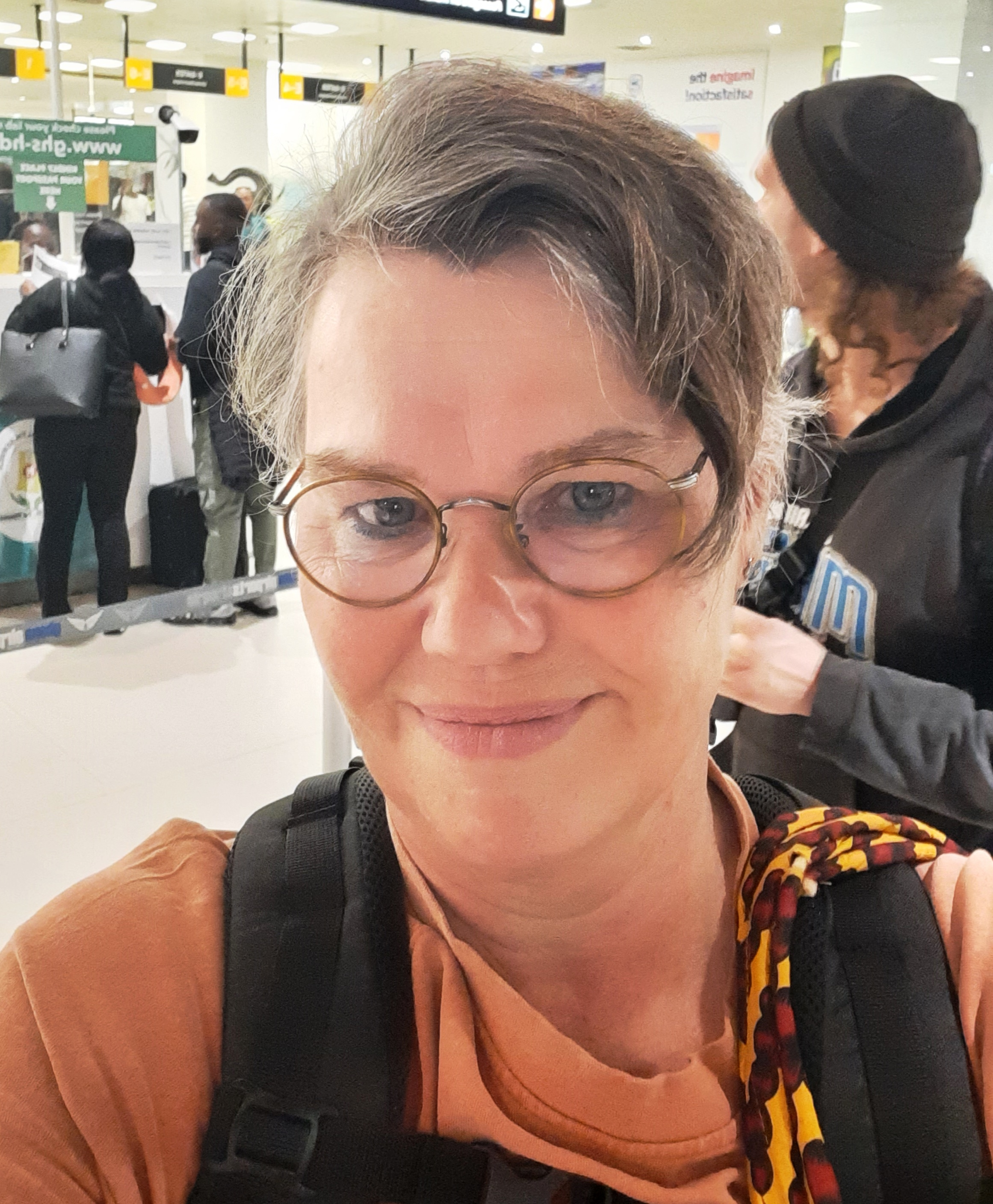
- Alber in 2023
- Born: July 14, 1963 (age 63); Hamburg, Germany
- Occupation: ethnologist

Academic background
- Education: Free University of Berlin; University of Tübingen
- Doctoral advisor: Georg Elwert

Academic work
- Discipline: Anthropology; Ethnology; Social anthropology
- Institutions: University of Bayreuth

Erdmute Alber (born July 14, 1963, in Hamburg) is a German ethnologist with research focus in political and kinship anthropology. Since 2010 she has held the chair in Social Anthropology at the University of Bayreuth.

== Education ==
From 1983 to 1990, Erdmute Alber studied literature, Spanish and history at the Eberhard Karls Universität Tübingen and the Freie Universität Berlin. After completing her master's degree, she worked from 1993 to 2000 as a research assistant at the Institute for Ethnology at the Freie Universität Berlin supervised by Georg Elwert. During this time she received her doctorate in 1997 on Transformations of power and rule among the Baatombu in northern Benin (1900-1995). Her dissertation was awarded the research promotion prize of the Frobenius Society. In the years 2001/02 she was employed as a research assistant in the DFG funded project Social Parenthood in West Africa.

== Career ==
From 2002 to 2007, Alber was appointed junior professor for Social Anthropology at the University of Bayreuth. In 2007, Alber was awarded a Heisenberg Professorship by the DFG for her outstanding scientific achievements, which she took up at the University of Bayreuth in 2008/09. She has held the Chair of Social Anthropology there since 2010. In 2011/12 she also received a fellowship at the research college Work and Age at the Humboldt University of Berlin. From 2018 to 2021, Alber was Vice Dean for Research in the 'Africa Multiple' cluster at the University of Bayreuth. From 2019 to 2021 she was director of the Bayreuth Academy of Advanced African Studies, of which she is one of the founding members (2012-2019). She has been a member of the funding committee for the KfW Young Talent Award since November 2022.

From 2004 to 2010, Alber held the position of deputy chairperson for two years, then chairperson of the Social Anthropology and Development Sociology Section of the German Sociological Association (DGS). Since 2004 she has headed the pre-selection committee and since 2010 has been a liaison lecturer for the de:Evangelisches Studienwerk Villigst at the University of Bayreuth. Also since 2004, she has been a liaison lecturer for the Heinrich Böll Foundation at the University of Bayreuth. She is a founding member and Principal Investigator of the Bayreuth International Graduate School of African Studies, where she was Equal Opportunities Officer 2007-2009 and Vice Dean 2009–2011. Since 2012 she has been a founding member and sub-project leader of the ‘Academy of Advanced African Studies’ and since 2012 a board member of the de:Vereinigung für Afrikawissenschaften in Deutschland (VAD), where she was deputy chair from 2012 to 2014. She has been a member of the Senate of the University of Bayreuth since 2013 and a member of the scientific advisory board of the Leibniz-Zentrum Moderner Orient (Berlin) since 2014. From 2014 to 2017 she was a member of the Commission for Self-Regulation in Science at the University of Bayreuth. From 1999 to 2015 she was editor of the Sociologus – Journal for Empirical Social Anthropology. Erdmute Alber was a Fellow at the 'Merian Institute for Advanced Studies in Africa' (MIASA) in Accra at the University of Ghana (Legon University) in 2023.

== Research ==
Alber carried out her first field research in Peru in 1988 and 1989. Since 1991, this has been followed by regular research stays in Benin and Togo (since 2006). Since 2013 she has also been involved in the sub-project African Middle Classes on the Move at the Bayreuth Academy of Advanced African Studies with field research in Kenya. She received teaching assignments at the History Department of the University of Zurich (Switzerland) and was a visiting professor at the Radboud University Nijmegen (Netherlands) in 2009.

Alber's regional interest was initially in the Andes region. Since 1991 she has been dealing with West Africa, in particular with the Republic of Benin. She has been researching and living intermittently in West Africa for over 25 years. Her research interests are processes of social change and the resulting dynamics in politics and kinship. The focus is on two research fields: the anthropology of politics, law and power and the anthropology of kinship, family and childhood. Of particular interest to her are topics at the interface of both fields, such as family and childhood policies, social parenting or child trafficking. Current concrete research topics are intergenerational relations, social parenthood and adoption, recent kinship constructions, siblings, football migration. and the emergence and dynamics of new middle classes. In addition to her own field research, Erdmute Alber supervises and accompanies field research in Togo, Ghana, Peru and Kenya. Albert has been co-responsible (together with Nikolaus Schareika) since 2021 in the ongoing DFG project "COVID-19 and nomadic pastoralism in the context of crisis and structural reform in Benin: learning from local risk management".

== Selected publications ==
=== Monographs ===
- 1990 Und wer zieht nach Huayopampa? Mobilität und Strukturwandel in einem peruanischen Andendorf. Saarbrücken/Fort Lauderdale: Breitenbach, ISBN 3-88156-494-2.
- 1999 Migración o movilidad en Huayopampa? Nuevos temas y tendencias en la discusión sobre la comunidad campesina en los Andes. Lima: Instituto de Estudios Peruanos.
- 2000 Im Gewand von Herrschaft. Modalitäten der Macht bei den Baatombu (1895-1995). Studien zur Kulturkunde, vol. 116. Cologne: Rüdiger Köppe, ISBN 3-89645-211-8.
- 2014 Soziale Elternschaft im Wandel. Kindheit, Verwandtschaft und Zugehörigkeit in Westafrika. Berlin: Dietrich Reimer, ISBN 978-3-496-02868-0.
- 2018 Transfers of Belonging. A Social History of Child Fostering in West Africa. Brill: Leiden, Boston

=== Anthologies and readers ===
- 2008 Generations in Africa. Connections and Conflict. Berlin u. a.: lit. (with Sjaak van der Geest und Susan Reynolds Whyte)
- 2010 Verwandtschaft heute. Berlin: Dietrich Reimer. (with Bettina Beer, Michael Schnegg und Julia Pauli)
- 2013 The Anthropology of Sibling Relations – Shared Parentage, Experience and Exchange. New York: Palgrave MacMillan. (with Cati Coe and Tatjana Thelen)
- 2013 Child Fostering in West Africa – new perspectives on theories and practices. Leiden/Boston: Brill. (wit Jeannett Martin and Catrien Notermans)
- 2015 Anthropological Perspectives on Care. Work, Kinship and the Life Course. Palgrave MacMillan: New York. (with Heike Drotbohm)
- 2017 Reconnecting State and Kinship. University of Pennsylvania Press: Philadelphia (with Tatjana Thelen)
- 2022 Politics and Kinship. A Reader. New York: Routledge (with Tatjana Thelen)
- 2023 The Politics of Making Kinship. Historical and Anthropological Perspectives. New York, Oxford: Berghahn Books (with David Warren Sabean, Simon Teuscher und Tatjana Thelen)

=== Articles and book chapters ===
- 2009 „Ethnologische Generationenforschung in Afrika“. In: Harald Künemund, Marc Szydlik (eds.): Generationen – multidisziplinäre Forschung. Martin Kohli zum 65. Geburtstag. Wiesbaden: Verlag für Sozialwissenschaften, pp. 105–118.
- 2010 “No School without Foster Families in Northern Benin: A Social Historical Approach”. In: Haldis Haukanes, Tatjana Thelen (eds.): Parenting after the century of the child. Tavelling ideals, institutional negotiations and individual responses. Aldershot: Ashgate, pp. 57–78.
- 2011 „Bindung und Fürsorge als Leitmotiv im westafrikanischen Beziehungsgeflecht“. In: Hans Bertram, Nancy Ehlert (eds.): Familie, Bindungen und Fürsorge. Familiärer Wandel in einer vielfältigen Moderne. Opladen: Barbara Budrich, pp. 533–556. (with Tabea Häberlein)
- 2012 „Verwandtschaft in Afrika: Transformationsprozesse im 20. Jahrhundert“. In: Thomas Bierschenk, Eva Spies (eds.): 50 Jahre Unabhängigkeit in Afrika: Kontinuitäten, Brüche, Perspektiven. Cologne: Rüdiger Köppe.
- 2012 „Pflegevater – Pflegemutter – Kind“. In: an.schläge, Nov 2012, Vienna: CheckArt, pp. 25–27.
- “Schooling or Working? How family decision processes, children’s agencies and state policy influence the life path of children in northern Berlin”. In: Gerd Spittler, Michael Bourdillon (eds.): African Children at Work. Working and Learning in Growing Up for Life. Beiträge zur Afrikaforschung, vol. 52. Münster: LiT, pp. 169–194.
- 2012 „Kinderhandel in Westafrika? Nationale Kinderschutzinitiativen und die Problematik der Mädchenarbeit in Nordbenin“. In: Heinz Heinen (Hg.): Kindersklaven – Sklavenkinder. Schicksale zwischen Zuneigung und Ausbeutung in der Antike und im interkulturellen Vergleich. Beiträge zur Tagung des Akademievorhabens Forschungen zur antiken Sklaverei. Stuttgart: Franz Steiner, pp. 43–62.
- 2013 „A qui appartiennent les enfants?“ Des norms et des practices de parenté sociale en Afrique de l’Ouest. In: Ute Fendler, Liliana Feierstein (eds.): Enfances? Représentation de l’enfance en Afrique et en Amérique Latine. Munich: Akademische Verlagsgemeinschaft, pp. 69–85
- 2014 “Familie in Afrika”. In: Paul B. Hill, Johannes Kopp (eds.): Handbuch Familiensoziologie. Wiesbaden: Springer. 147–178. (with Jeannett Martin)
- 2018 “Irresponsible Boys, Promiscuous Girls: Maturity, Gender, and Rape Myths in the Criminal Tribunals of Colonial Dahomey, 1924-1940”. La Revue d’histoire de l’enfance “irrégulière”, (No. 20), November 2018, pp. 67–84.
- 2018 « Préparer la Retraite »: New Age-Inscriptions in West African Middle Classes. Anthropology & Aging, vol. 39/1, pp. 66–81
- 2019 “Women in Benin”. In: Oxford Encyclopedia of African Women’s History. Oxford: Oxford University Press, 2019.
- 2019 “Politics of Kinship: Child Fostering in Dahomey/Benin”. Cahiers d´Études Africaines, vol. 234, pp. 359–375
- 2023 “Inventing the Extended Family in Colonial Dahomey/Benin'”. In: Erdmute Alber, David Warren Sabean, Simon Teuscher and Tatjana Thelen (eds.): The Politics of Making - Kinship. Historical and Anthropological Perspectives. New York, Oxford: Berghahn Books: pp. 296–323
