= Historisch-kritisches Wörterbuch des Marxismus =

Historisch-kritisches Wörterbuch des Marxismus (HKWM) (in English: Historical-Critical Dictionary of Marxism) is a major international German-language encyclopedia of Marxism. It is published by the Berlin Institute of Critical Theory (InkriT), Germany. The editor-in-chief is Wolfgang Fritz Haug. The work is planned to be published in 15 volumes. The first volume was published in 1994; in 2015 was vol. 8/II published and in March 2018 Band 9/I is to be published. The work is also available in electronic form and each article may be ordered separately as a pdf-file for immediately delivery.

== Publishing plan ==
- Vol. 1: Abbau des Staates – Avantgarde (1994)
- Vol. 2: Bank – Dummheit in der Musik (1995)
- Vol. 3: Ebene – Extremismus (1997)
- Vol. 4: Fabel – Gegenmacht (1999)
- Vol. 5: Gegenöffentlichkeit – Hegemonialapparat (2001)
- Vol. 6/I: Hegemonie – Imperialismus (2004)
- Vol. 6/II: Imperium – Justiz (2004)
- Vol. 7/I: Kaderpartei – Klonen (2008)
- Vol. 7/II: Knechtschaft – Krise des Marxismus (2010)
- Vol. 8/I: Krisentheorie – Linie Luxemburg/Gramsci (2012)
- Vol. 8/II: links/rechts – Maschinenstürmer (2015)
- Vol. 9/I: Maschinerie bis Mitbestimmung (March 2018)
- Vol. 9/II: Mitleid – naturwüchsig
- Band 10: Negation der Negation – Phantasie
- Band 11: Philosophie – Regulationsthoerie
- Band 12: Reichtum – Sorelismus
- Band 13: Sowjet – Text
- Band 14: Theater – verstehen/erklären
- Band 15: Versuch – Zynismus

== English Selection ==
- Historical-Critical Dictionary of Marxism. A Selection, edited by Wolfgang-Fritz Haug, Frigga Haug, Peter Jehle, Wolfgang Küttler; english selection edited by Konstantin Baehrens, Juha Koivisto, und Victor Strazzeri, Brill, Leiden 2023, ISBN 978-90-04-51568-0 (PDF as Open Access).

== See also ==
- Critical theory
