= Frigga Haug =

German sociologist and philosopher

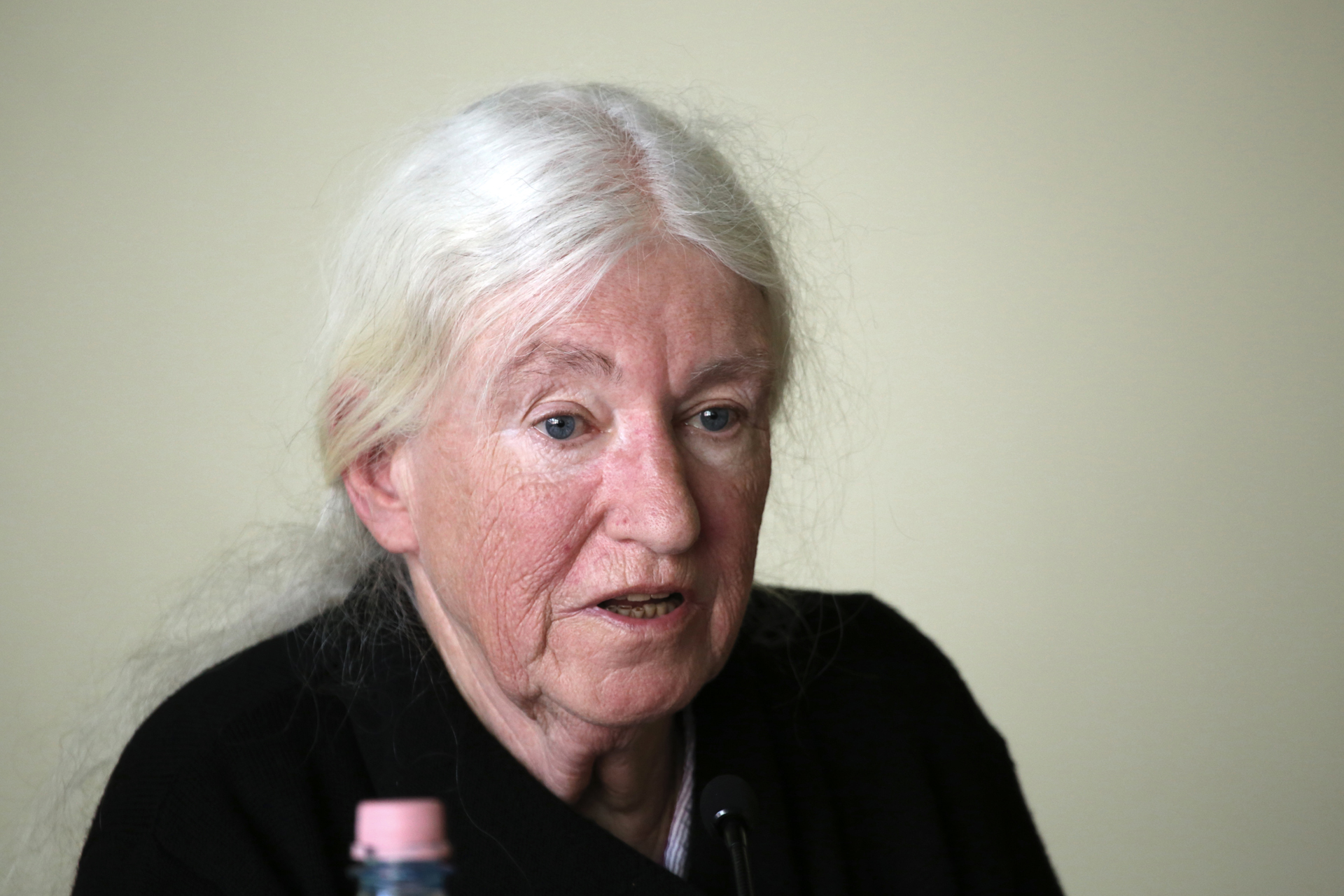
- Born: Frigga Langenberger; November 28, 1937 (age 88); Mülheim, Germany
- Occupations: Sociologist, philosopher, feminist
- Known for: Adiadne (book imprint), Das Argument (magazine)

Frigga Haug (née Langenberger; born November 28, 1937) is a German socialist-feminist sociologist and philosopher.

== Life ==
Frigga Langenberger was born in Mülheim. She studied sociology and philosophy at the Free University of Berlin. In 1963, she interrupted her studies to move to Cologne and give birth to a daughter. In 1965 she married a second time to the philosopher Wolfgang Fritz Haug. She graduated in sociology in 1971, and gained a PhD in sociology and social psychology in 1976.

Haug's magazine Das Argument grew out of her opposition to nuclear rearmament. She joined the Socialist German Student Union (SDS) in protest at the Vietnam War, and also developed a feminist perspective. In 1988 she founded the book imprint Adiadne.

== Works ==
- Kritik der Rollentheorie und ihrer Anwendung in der bürgerlichen deutschen Soziologie [Critique of role theory and its application in bourgeois German sociology]. Frankfurt: Fischer, 1972.
- Beyond female masochism: memory-work and politics, London/New York: Verso, 1980.
- Erinnerungsarbeit [Memory work]. Hamburg: Argument-Verlag, 1990
- (ed.) Historisch-Kritisches Wörterbuch des Feminismus [Historical-critical dictionary of feminism]. Hamburg: Argument-Verlag, 3 vols, 2003–2011.
