= Konstantinos A. Dimadis =

Greek scholar

- Born: November 1940 (age 85–86)
- Occupation: Scholar

Academic background
- Education: Aristotle University of Thessaloniki; University of Amsterdam (PhD)

Academic work
- Discipline: Modern Greek studies, archaeology, lexicography
- Institutions: Aristotle University of Thessaloniki; Freie Universität Berlin; University of Amsterdam, University of Groningen; Tbilisi State University

Konstantinos A. Dimadis (Greek: Κωνσταντίνος Α. Δημάδης; born November 1940) is a Greek scholar and emeritus professor in Modern Greek studies at the Freie Universität Berlin.

== Education and career ==
After studying at the Aristotle University of Thessaloniki, in 1964 he became a research associate at the 15th Ephorate of Classical Antiquities of East Macedonia and Thrace. His research enabled him to localize the administrative and religious centre of the city of Abdera in classical times and to discover the site of its Ancient theatre (1965). In the academic year 1967/1968 Dimadis was appointed research associate at the Department of Linguistics of the Aristotle University of Thessaloniki (collection and preparation of material for the Lexicon of Archaisms in Modern Greek Dialects, Verlag der Österreichischen Akademie der Wissenschaften 1974). From 1968 to 1973 he was a member of the editorial staff for the Dictionary of Medieval Greek Vernacular Literature, 1100-1669 by Emmanuel Kriaras, from 1973 to 1980 he worked as a research associate at the Institute for Balkan Studies in Thessaloniki. From 1978 to 1980, Dimadis also held a teaching position for Modern Greek at the department of Byzantine and Modern Greek Studies at the Freie Universität Berlin. This was followed by a lectureship at the department of Byzantine and Modern Greek Studies at the University of Amsterdam from 1980 to 1992, where he received his doctorate in 1990 with a thesis on liberal writers during the dictatorship of Metaxas and the occupation (1936-1944).

In 1992 Dimadis was appointed professor of Modern Greek language and literature at the University of Groningen as successor to Willem J. Aerts. From 1996 until his retirement in 2007, he was professor of Modern Greek studies at the Freie Universität Berlin. Since 2001 he has also been an honorary professor at the Institute of Classical Philology, Byzantine and Modern Greek Studies of the Tbilisi State University, Georgia.

Since 1985 Dimadis is the director of the International Summer School for Greek Language, History and Culture, Thessaloniki, Greece. Dimadis served as chairman of the European Society of Modern Greek Studies from 2002 to 2018 and received an honorary doctorate from the University of Bucharest in 2010.

== Academic interests ==
Dimadis’ works are characterized by their diversity: the spectrum ranges from archaeological works, such as the ancient history of theatre, and modern Greek lexicography and Balkan Studies to the study of modern Greek literature, especially the prose fiction of the 19th and 20th centuries. His interests focus on issues of editing and reception, and, from a literary-sociological perspective, on the interplay between literature and contemporary history, especially dictatorial regimes.

== Partial Bibliography ==
=== Books ===
- Ο Νίκος Καζαντζάκης και η πολιτική μέσα από δημοσιογραφικά και ταξιδιωτικά του κείμενα, Εισαγωγή Νίκος Ψιλάκης, Ηράκλειο 2025, σελ. 247, ISBN 978-618-87260-1-7
- Άγγελος Τερζάκης. Κείμενα πνευματικής ευθύνης (1930-1938). Φιλολογική έκδοση με σχόλια, Θεσσαλονίκη: University Studio Press 2024 (ISBN 978-960-12-2668-2)
- Πεζογραφία και εξουσία στη νεότερη Ελλάδα. Athens, Armos Publications 2018, 500 pp., 2nd edition, ISBN 978-960-615-162-0. [Prose Fiction and Power in Modern Greece]
- Power and Prose Fiction in Modern Greece. Athens, Armos Publications 2016, 273 pp., 1st Reprint, ISBN 978-960-527-922-6.
- Δικτατορία, Πόλεμος και Πεζογραφία 1936-1944. Γ. Θεοτοκάς, Μ. Καραγάτσης, Σ. Μυριβήλης, Λιλίκα Νάκου, Θ. Πετσάλης-Διομήδης, Π. Πρεβελάκης, Αγγ. Τερζάκης. Athens, Vivliopoleion tis “Estias” 2004, 538 pp., 2nd edition, ISBN 960-05-1141-1. [Dictatorship, War and the Greek Novel 1936–1944. Giorgos Theotokas, M. Karagatsis, Stratis Myrivilis, Lilika Nakou, Thanasis Petsalis-Diomidis, Pantelis Prevelakis, Angelos Terzakis]
- Η “νέα λογοτεχνία” κατά την περίοδο της μεταξικής δικτατορίας και της Καστοχής/ Liberale schrijvers onder de dictatuur van Metaxas en tijdens de Bezetting (1936-1944), PhD University of Amsterdam 1990, 326 pp. [Liberal writers during the Metaxas dictatorship and the occupation, 1936-1944; in Greek]

=== Edited books / volumes ===
- Βαλκανική Βιβλιογραφία/Balkan Bibliography. Institute for Balkan Studies, Thessaloniki. Vols. I (1972) [1974] - V (1976) [1979] + Supplement, Vols. I - V.
- Λιλίκα Νάκου, Μόσχω Τζαβέλλα. Φιλολογική επιμέλεια, πρόλογος και επίμετρο Κ. Α. Δημάδη. Athens, Ekdoseis Kastanioti 1995, 144 pp., ISBN 960-03-1447-0.
- Proceedings of the 1st, 3rd, 4th, 5th European Congress of Modern Greek Studies, organised by the European Society of Modern Greek Studies. Athens, Ellinika Grammata 1999, ISBN 960-344-861-3; Athens, Ellinika Grammata 2007, ISBN 978-960-19-0078-0; e-book, ISBN 978-960-99699-0-1; e-book, ISBN 978-618-81771-3-0.
- Emmanuil Kriaras, Psycharis - Auswahl aus seinen Werken (griechische Originaltexte mit deutscher Übersetzung), 2010, 669 pp., ISBN 978-84-95905-32-1.

=== Scholarly articles ===
- Ο Νίκος Καζαντζάκης την εποχή του φασισμού. In: Ioanna Spiliopoulou and Nikos Chrysos (eds): Ο Νίκος Καζαντζάκης και η πολιτική. Athens, Ekdoseis Kastanioti2019, pp. 53–78, ISBN 978-960-03-6563-4. [Nikos Kazantzakis in times of fascism]
- The Cultural Policy of the Metaxas Regime (1936-1941). In: Giorgos P. Pefanis (ed.): Η λάμψη του χρήματος στη νεοελληνική λογοτεχνία. Από την Κρητική Αναγέννηση στην αυγή του 21ου αιώνα. Athens, Ίδρυμα Κώστα και Ελένης Ουράνη 2014, pp. 161–213, ISBN 978-960-7316-64-6.
- Kazantzakis, Spanien und der Weg seiner literarischen Erneuerung. In: Elke Sturm-Trigonakis und Simela Delianidou (eds): Sprachen und Kulturen in (Inter)Aktion, Teil 1 – Literatur- und Kulturwissenschaft, Frankfurt am Main, Peter Lang Edition 2013, pp. 291–308, ISBN 978-3-631-64212-2 (Print).
- Der Spanische Bürgerkrieg in den Augenzeugenberichten von Nikos Kazantzakis (1936) und Spiros Melas (1939). In: Horst-Dieter Blume, Cay Lienau (eds): Nikos Kazantzakis (1883-1957) und seine Zeit (Choregia. Münstersche Griechenland-Studien, Heft 6). Münster 2008, pp. 43–50. [The Spanish civil war in the eyewitness reports of Nikos Kazantzakis (1936) and Spyros Melas (1939)]
- Sozialismus, Nationalismus und griechische Prosa 1922-1935. In: Wolfgang Dahmen, Petra Himstedt-Vaid, Gerhard Ressel (eds): Grenzüberschreitungen: Traditionen und Identitäten in Südosteuropa. Festschrift für Gabriella Schubert, Wiesbaden, Harrassowitz Verlag 2008, pp. 72–84, Balkanologische Veröffentlichungen Bd. 45, ISBN 978-3-447-05792-9.
- The circumstances leading to the first German translation of a Greek novel after 1830: Ο Εξόριστοςτου1831, by Alexandros Soutsos. In: Modern Greek Studies Yearbook [University of Minnesota], vol. 22/23 (2006/2007): 91-106, ISSN 0884-8432.
- Τα πρώτα πεζογραφικά κείμενα του Άγγελου Τερζάκη και το θέμα της αναζήτησης μιας κοινωνικής ταυτότητας στην Ελλάδα του 1922. In: Symeio (Nicosia, Chypre), vol. 2 (1993-1994): 211-220. [The first prose works of Angelos Terzakis and the issue of Greece’s social identity from 1922 onwards]
- Le Théâtre d’Abdera (données archéologiques). [IIIème Congrès International d’Études du Sud-Est Européen, Bucarest, 4-10 septembre 1974]. In: Balkan Studies, vol. 15.2 (1974): 308-321.
- Ποιος ο Βασίλειος στους Φυγάδες του Καβάφη; In: Nea Estia, vol. 92 (1972): 1688-1692. [Who is Vasileios in Kavafis’s poem Fygades?]
- Για τη θέση της αρχαίας Πιστύρου. Ο Προυσίας είχε περάσει στη Θράκη;In: ΘρακικάΧρονικά, vol. 26 (1967): 111-113. [On the location of ancient Pistyros. Did Prousias really go to Thrace?]

=== Literature ===
- Λεξικό Νεοελληνικής Λογοτεχνίας. Πρόσωπα - έργα - ρεύματα - όροι. Athens, Ekdoseis Pataki 2007, pp. 484–485.
- Tudor Dinu (ed.): In honorem Constantini Dimadis [In honor of Constantine Dimadis]. Foreword by Prof. Olga Cicanci. Publications of the University of Bucharest, Bucharest 2011 (Neograeca Bucurestiensia 2), 280 pp.
- Isabel García Gálvez y Olga Omatos Sáenz (eds): Tolmiros Skapaneas. Homenaje al professor Kostas A. Dimadis. Vitoria-Gasteiz, Sociedad Hispánica de Estudios Neogriegos, 2012, 573 pp. [Estudios Neogriegos, Número 14 (2011-2012)].
