= Renate Radek =

Protistologist, Freie Universität Berlin

- Education: University of Bonn
- Scientific career
- Fields: Protistology
- Doctoral advisor: Karl-Ernst Wohlfarth-Bottermann

Renate Radek is a protistologist and an associate professor at the Freie Universität Berlin.

== Education ==
Radek received a Diploma in biology from the University of Bonn in 1985. She received her PhD in 1987 at the University of Bonn's Institute of Cytology, supervised by Karl-Ernst Wohlfarth-Bottermann.

== Career ==
Radek worked as a research and teaching assistant at the University of Bonn (1987–1988), Freie Universität Berlin (1989–1996), the University of Heidelberg (1996–1999), and again at the Freie Universität Berlin (2000–2008), where she worked under the protistologist Klaus Hausmann. In 2008, upon completing her Habilitation, she was promoted to associate professor.

Radek has been an editorial board member at the European Journal of Protistology and an external reviewer for Acta Protozoologica since 2005, and a member of the board of reviewers at the Journal of Eukaryotic Microbiology since 2012. She is managing director of the German Society for Protozoology and is also a member of the Berlin Microscopical Society, the German Society for Parasitology, the International Society of Protistologists, and the Society for Invertebrate Pathology. Since her retirement at the end of 2025, she has been a member only of the Society of Eukaryotic Microbiology (formerly the German Society for Protozoology) and the Berlin Microscopical Society. She has been the managing director of the latter since 2011.

== Research ==
Over the course of her career, Radek has published almost 100 scientific papers, eleven book chapters, and two protistology textbooks. One of these textbooks, Protistology, has been translated into Chinese, Russian, and Korean. In 1991, she created a scientific film about termite flagellates with Klaus Hausmann.

Her current focus is on the biology and morphology of protists that live as symbionts and parasites in diverse insect hosts, notably termite gut flagellates and spore-forming protists (some of which, like the nephridiophagids, are now thought to be fungi) in cockroaches and beetles. She is also interested in the relationship between protists and their prokaryotic symbionts.
