= Georges Tamer =

British philologist and Islamic scholar

Georges Nicolas Tamer holds the Chair of Oriental Philology and Islamic Studies at the Friedrich-Alexander-University Erlangen-Nuremberg. Until September 2012, he was professor of Arabic and Islamic studies and the holder of the M.S. Sofia Chair in Arabic Studies at the Ohio State University in Columbus, Ohio. A scholar of religion, philosophy, and Arabic and Islamic literature and culture, his fields of specialization include Qur'anic studies, Arabic philosophy, Christian- and Judeo-Arabic thought, and Islam in modernity. He has previously taught at the Freie Universität Berlin, the University of Erlangen-Nürnberg, and the Central European University.

== Education and scholarly activity ==
Infected by polio as an infant in Lebanon, Tamer was unable to attend elementary school and relied on autodidactic learning and private tutoring. After attending high school in Lebanon for one year, Tamer moved to Germany where he studied philosophy, sociology and theology in Frankfurt inter alios with Jürgen Habermas. He obtained his MA in philosophy from the Freie Universität Berlin in 1995 and was granted a Ph.D. in philosophy in 2000. He completed his habilitation in Islamic Studies at the University of Erlangen-Nürnberg in 2007.

Tamer is a highly productive researcher throughout Europe, the United States, and the Middle East, having taken part in a number of research bodies and colloquia attached to institutes of higher education. These include the Institute for Advanced Study in Princeton and the Working Group on Modernity and Islam at the Wissenschaftskolleg zu Berlin. He has planned and hosted interdisciplinary conferences on Maimonides, humor in Arabic culture, migration in Germany, and, most recently, on the influential Muslim thinker al-Ghazali.

A member of the Antiochian Orthodox Church, Tamer founded a parish in Berlin. He has participated in several ecumenical activities and interfaith dialogue groups in Germany.

== Selected publications ==
=== Books ===
- Islamische Philosophie und die Krise der Moderne: Das Verhältnis von Leo Strauss zu Alfarabi, Avicenna und Averroes. Leiden, Boston, Köln: Brill (Islamic philosophy, theology and science, Vol. 43), 2001.
- Al-Hadātha wa-khitābuhā s-siyāsī (Modernity and its Political Discourse): An Anthology of Jürgen Habermas, translated into Arabic, with introduction and explanations, Beirut: Dar Annahar 2001.
- Tārīkh al-Qur'ān: Theodor Nöldeke et al., Geschichte des Qur'ans. Translation into Arabic, with Introduction, Explanations and Register, Beirut: Konrad-Adenauer-Stiftung 2004. 2nd Edition annotated with a new Preface. Köln, Beirut: Al-Kamel 2007.
- Die Trias des Maimonides. Jüdische, arabische und antike Wissenskultur / The Trias of Maimonides. Jewish, Arabic and Ancient Culture of Knowledge (Ed.), Berlin, New York: Walter De Gruyter 2005.
- Zeit und Gott: Hellenistische Zeitvorstellungen in der altarabischen Dichtung und im Koran, Berlin, New York: Walter De Gruyter 2008.
- Humor in der arabischen Kultur / Humor in Arabic Culture (Ed.), Berlin, New York: Walter De Gruyter 2009.
- Kritische Religionsphilosophie. In Memoriam Friedrich Niewöhner, Wilhelm Schmidt-Biggemann & Georges Tamer (Eds.), Berlin, New York: Walter De Gruyter 2010.

=== Articles and book chapters ===
- "Christliche Ökumene und Islam: Zeitgemäße Betrachtungen," in: Weg und Gestalt. Ed. Ökumenisch-Missionarisches Institut des Ökumenischen Rates Berlin-Brandenburg, Berlin 1998: 257–265.
- "Markab turāthī ya'ūd. Talkhīs Ibn Rushd li-kitāb Aflātūn fī s-siyāsa," in: Dirāsāt 'Arabīya 34, Nr. 11/12 (1998): 100–111.
- "'Laßt uns hier ein Dorf gründen' – Rum-Orthodoxe Christen aus der Türkei in Deutschland," in: Gerdien Jonker (Ed.), Kern und Rand. Religiöse Minderheiten aus der Türkei in Deutschland. Arbeitsheften des Zentrums Moderner Orient, Berlin 1999: 15–28.
- "Ex oriente lux? Ein Nachwort," in: Die Zukunft der orientalischen Christen. Eine Debatte im Mittleren Osten, hrsg. vom Evangelischen Missionswerk in Deutschland (EMW), dem Informationsprojekt Naher und Mittlerer Osten (INAMO) und Alexander Flores, Hamburg und Berlin 2001: 128–134.
- "Liū Shtraus wa-l-falsafa l-islāmīya l-wasīta," in: Al-Abhath 48/49, American University of Beirut (2000–2001): 81–126.
- "Wie können die vier Fragen Immanuel Kants im Zeitalter der Globalisierung und Gentechnik gelesen werden?," in: Roland Kreuzer (Ed.), Über Kant und Kunst. Beiträge zum Weltfragen Symposium, Berlin 2002: 21–23.
- "Kreuz und Halbmond im Lande der Zedern," in: Ideen und Informationen: Arbeitsheft zum Weltgebetstag, ed. Deutsches Weltgebetstagskomitee, Stein 2003: 116–121.
- "Kirche der Übergänge: Die rum-orthodoxe Kirche im Libanon und in Deutschland," in: Sabine Gralla (Ed.), Oriens Christianus. Geschichte und Gegenwart des nahöِstlichen Christentums. Villigst Profile Bd. 1. Lit Verlag Münster/Hamburg 2003: 93–110.
- "Al-’ān mil' az-zamān," in: Chronos. Revue d'Histoire de l'Université de Balamand 8 (2003): 223-243
- "Kultursynthese als Friedenspotential: Rum-Orthodoxe aus Nahost in Deutschland," in: Hans-Martin Barth/Christoph Elsas (Eds.), in: Religiöse Minderheiten - Potentiale für Konflikt und Frieden. E. B.-Verlag Hamburg 2004: 103–115.
- "Warum der christlich-islamische Dialog notwendig ist," in: Ursula Spuler-Stegemann (Ed.), Feindbild Christentum im Islam. Verlag Herder Freiburg 2004: 62–74.
- "Monotheismus und Politik bei Alfarabi," in: Aziz Al-Azmeh and János M. Bak (Ed.), Montheistic Kingship: The Medieval Variants, Budapest: Central European University, Dept. of Medieval Studies, 2004 (= CEU Medievalia 5): 191–214.
- "Politisches Denken in pseudoplatonischen arabischen Schriften," in: Mélanges de l'Université Saint Joseph. The Greek Strand in Islamic Political Thought. Proceedings of the Conference held at the Institute for Advanced Study of Greek, Princeton 16–27 June 2003. Vol. LVII (2004): 303–335.
- "Zur Interpretation von Heiligen Schriften bei Averroes und Maimonides," in: Georges Tamer (Ed.), Die Trias des Maimonides. Jüdische, arabische und antike Wissenskultur. Berlin, New York: Walter De Gruyter 2005: 237–256.
- "Glauben und Wissen: Ein Widerspruch?," in: H. J. Luibl, K. Städler, Ch. Sudermann, K. Ulrich-Eschemann (Eds.), Gott und die Wissenschaften, Berlin: LIT Verlag 2007: 34–44.
- "Khawātir fī l-‛ilm wa-l-’īmān. A-sinwān humā am diddān?," in: Georges Massouh, As‛ad Qattān, Georges Tamer (Eds.), Wajh wa-wahj: Festschrift for Metropolitan Georges Khodr, Beirut: An-Nour Publisher 2007: 87–107.
- "Koexistenz im Konflikt: Konfession und Politik im Libanon," in: Karl Pinggéra (Ed.), "... so soll der Libanon fruchtbares Land werden". Christen im Libanon – Probleme und Perspektiven, Hofgeismar: Evangelische Akademie Hofgeismar 2007: 9-24.
- "Bemerkungen zu al-Fārābīs 'Zusammenfassung der platonischen Nomoi'," in: Andreas Eckl / Clemens Kauffamnn (Eds.), Politischer Platonismus, Würzburg: Königshausen & Neumann 2008: 53–62.
- "Islam und Zivilgesellschaft," in: Otto Jastrwo, Shabo Talay, Herta Hafenrichter (Eds.), Studien zur Semitistik und Arabistik. Festschrift for Hartmut Bobzin zum 60. Geburtstag, Wiesbaden: Harrassowitz 2008: 403–423.
- "Christliche Trinität und islamischer Monotheismus: Yah9yā Ibn (Adīs Gottesbild," in: Martin Tamcke (Ed.), Christliche Gotteslehre im Orient seit dem Aufkommen des Islams bis zur Gegenwart, Beiruter Texte und Studien 126. Beirut: Orient-Institut Beitrut 2008: 83–99.
- "The Qur'ān and humor," in: Georges Tamer (Ed.), Humor in der arabischen Kultur / Humor in Arabic Culture, Berlin, New York: Walter De Gruyter 2009: 3-28.
- "Faith and Knowledge Revisited," in: Rosenzweig Jahrbuch 4 (2009): 156–175.
- "Hellenistic Ideas of Time in the Koran," in: Lothar Gall & Dietmar Willoweit, eds., Judaism, Christianity, and Islam in the Course of History: Exchange and Conflicts, München: Oldenbourg-Verlag 2010: 21–42.
- "Alter Wein in neuen Schläuchen? Zum Umgang des Averroes mit dem Koran und seiner Rezeption im zeitgenössischen islamischen Denken," in: Wilhelm Schmidt-Biggemann and Georges Tamer (Eds.), Kritische Religionsphilosophie. In Memoriam Friedrich Niewöhner, Berlin, New York: Walter De Gruyter 2010: 47–84.
