= Wolfgang Rautenberg =

German mathematician and logician (1936–2011)

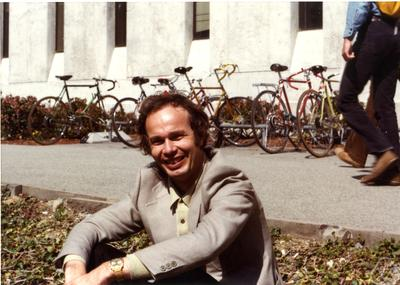
- Wolfgang Rautenberg 1975 in Berkeley
- Born: 27 February 1936; Potsdam, Germany
- Died: 4 September 2011 (aged 75); Berlin, Germany
- Education: Freie Universität Berlin
- Scientific career
- Fields: Mathematical logic, foundations of mathematics
- Doctoral advisor: Karl Schröter
- Website: http://www.math.fu-berlin.de/~raut

Wolfgang Rautenberg (27 February 1936 − 4 September 2011) was a German mathematician and logician whose areas of research were model theory, non-classical logic, modal logic, temporal logic and self reference.

== Life ==
Rautenberg was born in Potsdam. He graduated with an abitur from the gymnasium in Ludwigslust. He studied mathematics and physics at the Humboldt University in East Berlin (GDR), and there in 1963 Rautenberg received a doctorate and worked as a logician. In 1968 Rautenberg graduated from the Humboldt University as an academic lecturer. From 1969 to 1973 Rautenberg was docent at the Humboldt University. Because the Stasi contacted him to force him into co-operation, Rautenberg left East Germany in 1973 and in 1974 became Professor in West Germany. In 1976 he accepted a call to chair the academic department for mathematical logic and foundations of mathematics at Freie Universität Berlin.

Wolfgang Rautenberg was also a very active contributor in the HP48 and HP49G / HP49G+ calculator community, with many important contributions.

== Books ==
- W. Rautenberg, ed. (1987), Omega-Bibliography of Mathematical Logic, vol. I, Classical Logic, Heidelberg: Springer.
- W. Rautenberg, ed. (1987), Omega-Bibliography of Mathematical Logic, vol. II, Non-Classical Logic, Heidelberg: Springer.
- W. Rautenberg (2010), A Concise Introduction to Mathematical Logic (3rd ed.), New York City: Springer Science+Business Media, doi:10.1007/978-1-4419-1221-3, ISBN 978-1-4419-1220-6.
