= Klaus Jacob (political scientist) =

German political scientist

Klaus Jacob (born 4 January 1967) is a German political scientist, working as Research Director at the Environmental Policy Research Centre, Freie Universität Berlin. He publishes on issues such as political ecology, environmental policy in international comparison, environmental policy integration in the various domains of policy making and innovation and market effects of environmental policy. Jacob is spokesperson of the working group Environmental Policy and Global Change of the German Political Science Association and chairperson of the organizational committee of the international conference series "Berlin Conferences on the Human Dimension of Global Environmental Change".
