= Sociologus =

Sociologus: Journal for Empirical Social Anthropology is a peer-reviewed academic journal of social anthropology. It was established in 1925 by Richard Thurnwald and is published by Duncker & Humblot. The journal covers empirical research on cultural diversity, social processes and their transformations, and the contrasting forms of social relations, and also contains reviews of books, exhibitions, and ethnographic films. It is published in German and English. The editor-in-chief from 1999 to 2007 was Erdmute Alber (University of Bayreuth), the present chief editors are Bettina Beer (Lucerne) and Eveline Dürr (Munich).

== Abstracting and indexing ==
The journal is abstracted and indexed in the Social Sciences Citation Index. According to the Journal Citation Reports, the journal has a 2012 impact factor of 0.133.
