= Das Argument =

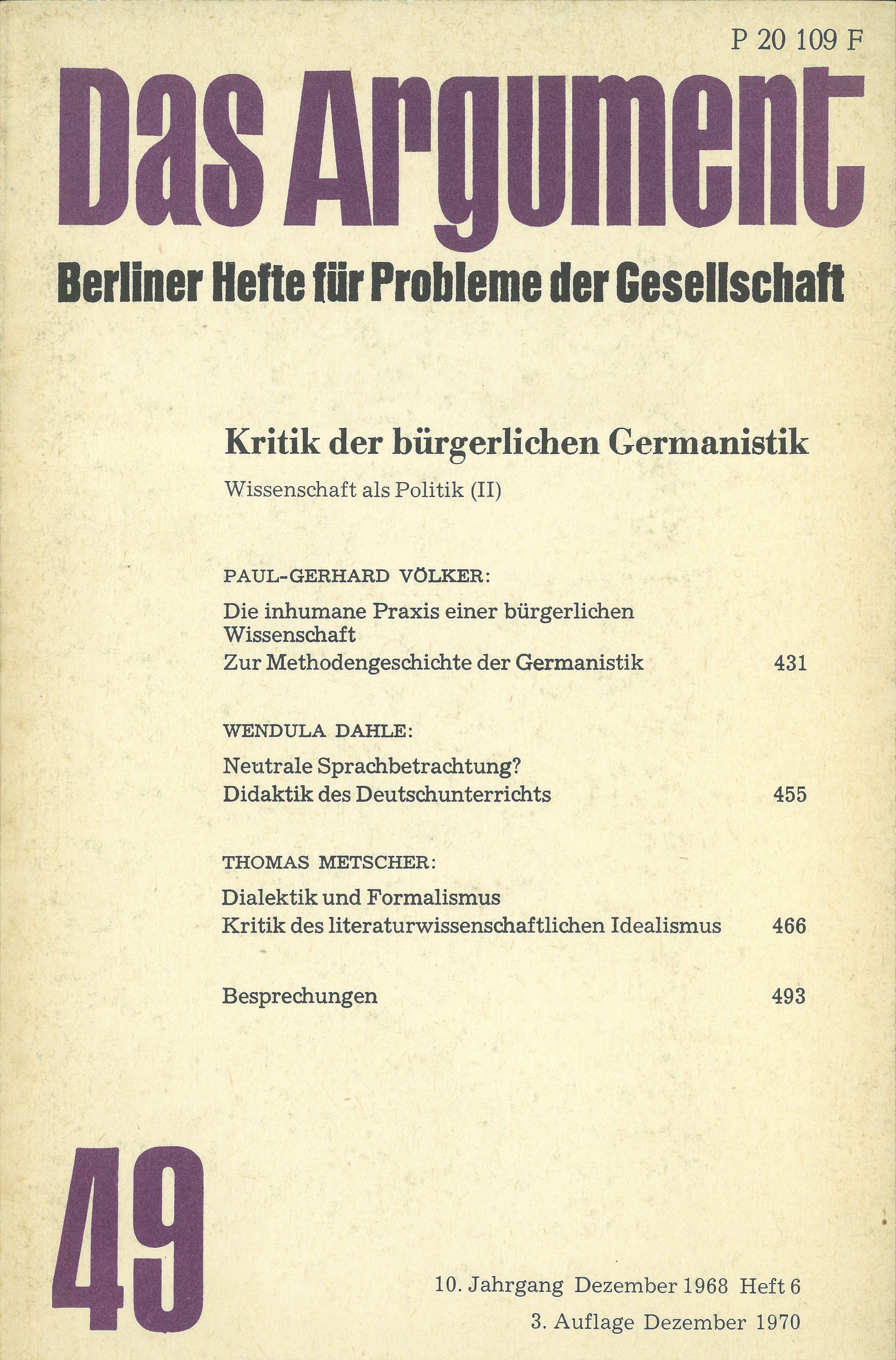
- Language: German
- Edited by: Lukas Meisner, Anna Chiara Mezzasalma, Nikita Zagvozdkin, Marina Barreto, Theresa Walter

Publication details
- History: 1959–present
- Publisher: Berlin Institute for Critical Theory (Germany)
- Frequency: Biennial

Standard abbreviations
- ISO 4: Argument

Indexing
- ISSN: 0004-1157
- LCCN: sn86000213
- OCLC no.: 1743472

Links
- Journal homepage; Online archive

Das Argument: Zeitschrift für Philosophie und Sozialwissenschaften (English: The Argument: Journal for Philosophy and Social Sciences) is a biennial German academic journal covering philosophy and social sciences from a Marxist viewpoint. It was established in 1959 as an independent West German journal. Each issue of the journal is devoted to a specific theme and contains a substantial review section.

== History ==
The journal emerged from the protests against West German remilitarization. Since 1959 and until 2025, the editor-in-chief has been the Marxist philosopher Wolfgang Fritz Haug (Free University of Berlin). Since issue 344, the journal is published by the philosopher Lukas Meisner, commissioned by the Berlin Institute of Critical Theory.

== Abstracting and indexing ==
The journal is abstracted and indexed in:

- International Bibliography of Periodical Literature
- Modern Language Association Database
- Philosopher's Index
- ProQuest databases
- Scopus
