= Richard Thurnwald =

Austrian anthropologist (1869–1954)

- Born: 18 September 1869; Vienna
- Died: 19 January 1954 (aged 84); Berlin
- Scientific career
- Fields: Anthropology

Richard Thurnwald (18 September 1869 – 19 January 1954) was an Austrian anthropologist and sociologist, known for his comparative studies of social institutions.

== Biography ==
He studied law, economics and oriental languages in Berlin, earning a law degree in 1891. He then took a government post, and while being stationed in Bosnia (from 1896), he conducted research of the local social and economic climate. In 1898 he travelled to Egypt, and following his return to Berlin, he took classes in Egyptology and Assyriology (1901–05). In Berlin, he found employment as an assistant curator at the Museum für Völkerkunde.

In 1917 he completed his habilitation at the University of Halle, and several years later, began giving lectures in sociology and anthropology in Berlin (1924). From 1931 to 1936, he taught classes in the United States, giving lectures at Harvard, Yale and at the University of California. After World War II, as a professor at the Free University of Berlin, he established the Institute of Social and Cultural Anthropology.

During his career, he conducted ethno-sociological studies in the Solomon Islands and Micronesia (1906–09). In New Guinea (1912–15) he was the first European entering the highlands of central New Guinea along with Walter Behrmann also a member of the Kaiserin-Augusta-Fluss Expedition of 1912-13.

Later he traveled to East Africa (1930) to continue his studies. He departed from the influential views of Wilhelm Wundt and Lucien Lévy-Bruhl, and believed that by analyzing social institutions comparatively, one could better explain their differences and how these differences determined the fundamental function of each institution. Thus, by comparing functional social structures, Thurnwald formed sequences of historical development.

Robert Lowie praised him in an obituary as "one of the most productive ethnologists of his time".

== Published works ==
In 1925 he founded the journal, Zeitschrift für Völkerpsychologie und Soziologie, a publication that was later renamed Sociologus. From 1931 to 1934, he published the highly acclaimed Die menschliche Gesellschaft in ihren ethno-soziologischen Grundlagen ("The ethno-sociological foundations of human society"; 5 volumes). Several of his works have been published in English, such as:

- Bánaro society; social organization and kinship system of a tribe in the interior of New Guinea, 1916.
- Economics in primitive communities, 1932.
- (with Diedrich Westermann) The missionary and anthropological research, 1932.
- Black and white in East Africa; the fabric of a new civilization; a study in social contact and adaptation of life in East Africa, 1935.
- Profane literature of Buin, Solomon Islands, 1936.
