= Wolfgang Fritz Haug =

German philosopher

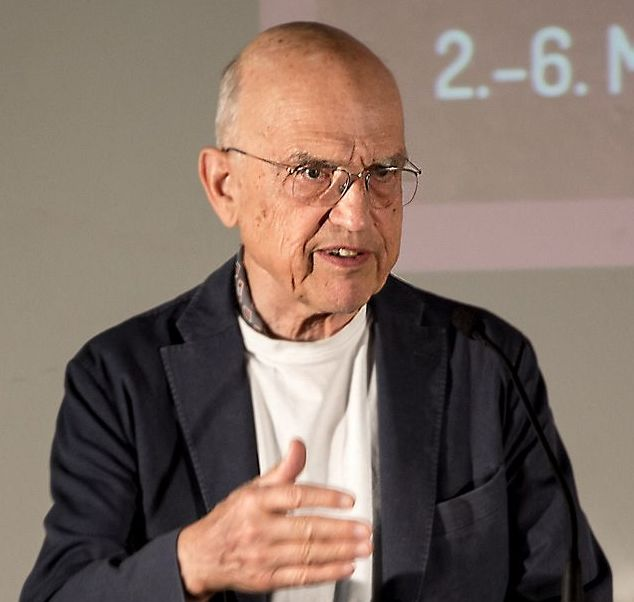
Wolfgang Fritz Haug

Wolfgang Fritz Haug (born March 23, 1936, in Esslingen am Neckar, Württemberg) was from 1979 till his retirement in 2001 professor of philosophy at the Free University Berlin, where he had also studied romance languages and religious studies and taken his PhD (in 1966 on the topic of "Jean-Paul Sartre and the construction of absurdity").

== Career ==
Haug coined the term commodity aestheticism (Warenästhetik, in German). His Critique of Commodity Aesthetics has been translated into numerous languages. Since 1958, he has also been the chief editor of the journal Das Argument, the successor to the Zeitschrift für Sozialforschung (1933–1941). The latter journal was housed at the Institute of Social Research (founded by Max Horkheimer). In a sense, Haug thus maintains a direct line from the Frankfurt School. Since 1994, Haug also edits the Historisch-kritische Wörterbuch des Marxismus and edited The Historical Critical Dictionary of Marxism, published by the Berlin Institute of Critical Theory.

With his wife Frigga Haug he was one of the first to become members of the new left wing party Die Linke in 2007.

Haug is a member of the Scientific Advisory Board of ATTAC.

== Major books and papers ==
- Kritik der Warenästhetik (1971).
- High-Tech-Kapitalismus. Analysen zu Produktionsweise, Arbeit, Sexualität, Krieg und Hegemonie, 2003.
- Historisch-kritisches Wörterbuch des Marxismus (in 15 books, 7 already published), 1994-today.
