= List of University of Göttingen people =

This is a list of notable academics who have taught or studied at the University of Göttingen, located in Göttingen, Lower Saxony, Germany.

== Natural and pure sciences, mathematics ==
=== A ===
- Wilhelm Ackermann – Mathematics
- Immo Appenzeller – Astrophysics
- Cahit Arf – (Doctorate in Mathematics)

=== B ===
- Heinrich Behmann – Mathematical Logic
- Paul Bernays – Mathematics, mathematical logic – (Student, later Professor extraordinarius)
- Patrick Blackett – Physics – Nobel Prize in Physics 1948
- Johann Friedrich Blumenbach— comparative anatomy
- Max Born – Mathematical Physics – (Professor ordinarius) – (1882–1970, in Göttingen 1921–1933) – Nobel Prize in Physics 1954
- Walther Bothe – Physics – Nobel Prize in Physics 1954 together with Max Born
- Stefan Bräse – Chemistry
- Michael Buback – Chemistry
- Adolf Butenandt – Chemistry – Nobel Prize in Chemistry 1939

=== C ===
- Constantin Carathéodory – Mathematics
- Alonzo Church – Mathematical Logic (Postdoc)
- Richard Courant – Mathematics
- Haskell Curry – Mathematical Logic (Postdoc)

=== D ===
- Peter Debye – Mathematical Physics – (Professor ordinarius) – (1884–1966, in Göttingen 1914–1920) – Nobel Prize in Chemistry 1936
- Richard Dedekind – Mathematics
- Hans Georg Dehmelt – Nobel Prize in Physics 1989
- Max Delbrück – Astronomy, Physics – Nobel Prize in Medicine 1969
- Paul Dirac – Physics – Nobel Prize in Physics 1933 (with Erwin Schrödinger)
- Peter Gustav Lejeune Dirichlet – Mathematics

=== E ===
- Manfred Eigen – Biophysical Chemistry – Nobel Prize in Chemistry 1967 (with Ronald G. W. Norrish and George Porter)
- Albert Einstein – Physics – Nobel Prize in Physics 1921 – (Visiting lecturer, 1915)
- Heinz Ellenberg – Biology, Botany – (Professor ordinarius) (1913–1997, in Göttingen 1966–1981 emeritus)

=== F ===
- William Feller – Mathematics
- Enrico Fermi – Physics – Nobel Prize in Physics 1938
- James Franck – Physics – Nobel Prize in Physics 1925 (with Gustav Hertz)
- Gottlob Frege – Mathematical Logic
- Uta Fritze-von Alvensleben – Astrophysicist
- Lazarus Immanuel Fuchs – Mathematics

=== G ===
- Carl Friedrich Gauß – Astronomy, geodesy, mathematics, physics – (Professor ordinarius for astronomy)
- Gerhard Gentzen – Mathematics
- Kurt Gödel – Mathematical logic – (Visiting scholar, 1939)
- Maria Goeppert-Mayer – Physics – Nobel Prize in Physics 1963
- Victor Goldschmidt – Chair in Mineralogy
- Hans Grauert – Mathematics
- August Grisebach – Botany

=== H ===
- Alfréd Haar – Mathematics
- Otto Hahn – Chemistry – Nobel Prize in Chemistry 1944
- Georg Hamel – Mathematics
- Jacob Pieter Den Hartog – Fluid Mechanics
- Helmut Hasse – Mathematics
- Klaus Hasselmann – Physics – Nobel Prize in Physics 2021
- Herbert Hawkes – Mathematics
- Walter Norman Haworth – Chemistry – Nobel Prize in Chemistry 1937
- Stefan W. Hell – Nobel Prize in Chemistry 2014 (affiliated with Heidelberg University but works at the Max-Planck Instiutute for Interdisciplinary Sciences at Göttingen formerly known as Max-Planck Institute for Biophysical Chemistry)
- Heinrich Heesch – Mathematics
- Andreas J. Heinrich – Physics
- Werner Heisenberg – Physics – (Professor ordinarius) – Nobel Prize in Physics 1932
- Ernst Hellinger – Mathematics
- Gerhard Herzberg – Chemistry – Nobel Prize in Chemistry 1971
- David Hilbert – Mathematics – (Professor ordinarius)
- Heinz Hopf – Mathematics
- Friedrich Hund – Mathematics

=== I ===
- Ernst Ising – Mathematics

=== J ===
- Pascual Jordan – Doctorate in Physics

=== K ===
- Erich Kamke – Doctorate in Mathematics
- Abraham Gotthelf Kästner – Mathematics
- Rudolf Kippenhahn – Astrophysics
- Felix Klein – Mathematics
- Friedrich Kohlrausch – Doctorate in physics
- Carl Koldewey – Mathematics
- Andrey Kolmogorov – Mathematics (Visiting scholar at the institute of mathematics, 1931 where he published his pioneering work in statistical physics)
- Hans Krebs – Biochemistry; Nobel Prize in Physiology or Medicine 1953
- Herbert Kroemer – Physics – Nobel Prize in Physics 2000
- Wolfgang Krull – Mathematics
- Heinrich Gerhard Kuhn – Physics

=== L ===
- Edmund Landau – Mathematics
- Dieter Langbein – Theoretical physics
- Irving Langmuir – Chemistry – Nobel Prize in Chemistry 1932
- Max von Laue – Physics – Nobel Prize in Physics 1914
- August Treboniu Laurian – Mathematics, Physics, founding member of the Romanian Academy and leader of the 1848 Revolution in Transylvania
- Georg Christoph Lichtenberg – Physics, Mathematics, Astronomy – (Student) – (Professor ordinarius)

=== M ===
- Saunders Mac Lane – Mathematics
- Tobias Mayer – Mathematics
- Robert Andrews Millikan – Physics – Nobel Prize in Physics 1923
- Hermann Minkowski – Mathematics
- Ludger Mintrop – Geophysics – pioneer in seismic exploration

=== N ===
- Leonard Nelson – Mathematics
- Walther Nernst – Physical Chemistry – Nobel Prize in Chemistry 1920
- John von Neumann – Physics, Computer Science (Postdoc)
- Albert Niemann – Known for the synthesis of cocaine
- Emmy Noether – Mathematics

=== O ===
- Hans von Ohain – Physics (Doctorate)
- Joshua Sikhu Okonya – Agricultural sciences (Doctorate)
- Robert Oppenheimer – Physics (Doctorate in physics)
- Alexander Ostrowski – Mathematics (Doctorate in natural sciences)

=== P ===
- Peter Simon Pallas – Zoology, Botany – (Student)
- Wolfgang Pauli – Physics – Nobel Prize in Physics 1945
- Wilhelm Pfeffer – Botany – (Student)
- Max Planck – Physics – Nobel Prize in Physics 1918
- Ludwig Prandtl – Physics – (Professor ordinarius)

=== R ===
- Richard Rado – Mathematics
- Johann Radon – Mathematics
- Kurt Reidemeister – Mathematics
- Theodore William Richards – Chemistry – Nobel Prize in Chemistry 1914
- Bernhard Riemann – Mathematics – (Professor ordinarius)
- Frigyes Riesz – Mathematics
- Walther Ritz – Mathematics
- Carl Runge – Mathematics
- István Rybár – Geophysics (Visiting scholar)

=== S ===
- Arthur Moritz Schönflies – Mathematics
- Moses Schönfinkel – Mathematical Logic
- Hermann Amandus Schwarz – Mathematics
- Carl Ludwig Siegel – Mathematics – (Professor ordinarius)
- Hertha Sponer – Physics
- Hugo Steinhaus - Mathematics
- Moritz Abraham Stern – Mathematics – (Professor ordinarius)
- Otto Stern – Physics – Nobel Prize in Physics 1943
- Gabriel Sudan – Mathematics
- Thoralf Skolem – Mathematics, mathematical logic – (Visiting scholar)
- Thomas A. Steitz – Nobel Prize in Chemistry 2009

=== T ===
- Gustav Tammann – Inorganic and Physical Chemistry
- Oswald Teichmüller – Mathematics
- Edward Teller – Physics
- Bruno Tesch – Nazi war criminal known for his involvement in the invention and distribution of toxin Zyklon B studied chemistry here as an undergraduate.
- Le Van Thiem – Mathematics
- Otto Toeplitz – Mathematics
- Johann Georg Tralles – Mathematics
- Alan Turing – Computer Science; there is some debate about whether Turing interrogated Konrad Zuse late summer 1947 at a "mysterious meeting" in Göttingen.

=== V ===
- Woldermar Voigt – Mathematics
- Christiane Volger – Forestry

=== W ===
- Otto Wallach – Chemistry – Nobel Prize in Chemistry 1910
- Bartel Leendert van der Waerden – Mathematics
- Arnold Walfisz – Mathematics
- Ulrich Walter; biomedical sciences
- Wolfgang Sartorius von Waltershausen – Geology
- Wilhelm Weber – Physics – (Professor ordinarius)
- Julius Weisbach – Mathematics
- Hermann Weyl – Mathematics
- Eugene Paul Wigner – Physics – Nobel Prize in Physics 1963
- Wilhelm Wien – (Student) – Nobel Prize in Physics 1911
- Norbert Wiener – Mathematics
- Adolf Windaus – Chemistry – Nobel Prize in Chemistry 1928
- Friedrich Wöhler – Chemistry, Pharmacy – (Professor ordinarius)

=== Z ===
- Ernst Zermelo – Mathematics
- Richard Adolf Zsigmondy – Chemistry – Nobel Prize in Chemistry 1925

== Law, economics and social sciences ==
=== A–M ===
- Rudolf von Bennigsen – Law – (Student)
- Otto von Bismarck – Law – (Student) – iron chancellor of the second German Empire
- Wilhelm von Bode – Law, Arts – (Student)
- Dieter Bohlen – Economics – (Student)
- Zhu De – (Student, 1922–1925) – Cofounder of the People's Liberation Army of China
- Georg Diederichs – Law, Economics, Pharmacy – (Student)
- Manolache Costache Epureanu – Law, (Prime Minister of Romania in 1870 and in 1876)
- Gustav von Hugo – Law – (Student) – (Professor ordinarius)
- Rudolf von Jhering – Law – (Student) – (Professor ordinarius)
- Klaus Kleinfeld – Business Administration – (Student)
- Georg Klute – (born 1952), ethnologist and sociologist, Prof.em.Dr. Univ. of Bayreuth
- Hinrich Wilhelm Kopf – Law and Administrative Sciences – (Student)
- Ursula von der Leyen – Economics – President of the European Commission
- Georg Michaelis – Law – (doctorate)
- Nicolae Mișu – (doctorate Law, Minister of Foreign Affairs of Romania in 1919)
- John Pierpont Morgan – (Student)

=== N–Z ===
- Lassa Oppenheim – Law – (doctorate)
- Andreas Paulus – Law – (Professor, Judge of the Federal Constitutional Court of Federal Republic of Germany)
- Helmuth Plessner – (Professor and university president)
- Johann Stephan Pütter – Law – (Professor ordinarius)
- Ingrid Robeyns – Economics – (student)
- Claus Roxin – Law – (Professor ordinarius1963–1971)
- Georg Friedrich Sartorius (von Waltershausen) – Economics and History
- Friedrich Carl von Savigny – Law – (Student)
- Wilhelm Theodor Schiefler – Law – writer, professor and linguist;
- Edzard Schmidt-Jortzig – Law – (scientific Assistant, Habilitand)
- Percy Ernst Schramm – History – (Professor 1929–1963)
- Gerhard Schröder – Law – (Student, AStA-Chairman, Honorary doctorate of Natural Sciences) – former chancellor of Germany
- Fritz-Dietlof von der Schulenburg – Law (Victim of 20 July 1944) – (Student)
- Joseph J. Sherman – Social Sciences – (Student) – Artist
- Heinrich Friedrich Karl Freiherr vom Stein – Law – (Student, 1773–1777)
- Richard von Weizsäcker – History, Law – (Student, doctorate) – former President of Germany
- Hans Julius Wolff – Law – (doctorate)

== Humanities and theology ==
=== A–F ===
- Friedrich Bouterwek – Philosopher – (Professor)
- Heinrich Brugsch – Egyptology – (Professor ordinarius) – (1827–1894, in Göttingen 1868–1870)
- Georg Bühler – Scholar of Indian languages and law
- Alexander Conze – Archaeology – (Student, Privatdozent)
- Karl Deichgräber – Philology – (Student, Professor)
- Georg Ebers – Law (later famous Egyptologist) – (Student)
- Rudolf Eucken – Philosopher – (Student) – Nobel Prize in Literature 1908
- Heinrich Ewald – Theology, Orientalistic – (Student) – (Professor ordinarius)
- Marlina Flassy – Anthropology, first woman Dean at Cenderawasih University.
- Johann Nikolaus Forkel – Law, Music (Student, Professor, Music director)
- Sigmar Gabriel – Teaching German, Sociology, Politics – (Student)

=== G–M ===
- Basil Lanneau Gildersleeve – American Classicist
- Günter Grass – Nobel Prize in Literature 1999
- Hermann von Grauert – History – (Student)
- Jonas Grethlein, German classicist
- Georg Friedrich Grotefend – Philology – Decipherer of Cuneiform script
- Jacob Grimm – Linguistics and History of Literature – (Professor ordinarius, Bibliothekar)
- Wilhelm Grimm – Linguistics and History of Literature – (Professor ordinarius, Bibliothekar)
- Jürgen Habermas
- Rebekka Habermas – Modern history
- Nicolai Hartmann – Philosophy – (Professor)
- Heinrich Heine – Law – (Student, Doctorate)
- Johann Friedrich Herbart – Philosophy, Pedagogy, Psychology – (Professor)
- Christian Gottlob Heyne – Linguistics and History, Archaeology – (Professor ordinarius)
- Edmund Husserl – Philosophy
- Nae Ionescu – Philosophy – (Student)
- Charles W. Kent – Literature – student
- Walther Killy – Literature – Rector 1967–68
- Reinhard Gregor Kratz – Biblical scholar, History of ancient Judaism
- Philip G. Kreyenbroek – Iranology – known for his studies on Yazidi culture
- August Leskien – Linguistics – (Professor extraordinarius)
- Gustav Meyer – Linguistics – (Assistant and later Professor)
- Adolf Muschg – Germanistics – (Assistant)

=== N–Z ===
- Ludwig Quidde – History, Philosophy, Economics – (Student) – Nobel Peace Prize 1927 (with Ferdinand Buisson)
- Eva Rieger – Musicology
- Dorothea von Rodde-Schlözer – Doctor of Philosophy – The first woman to be awarded a higher degree in Germany.
- Waldemar R. Röhrbein – History
- John Sadananda – Old Testament Scholar and Master of the Senate of Serampore College (University), India
- Friedrich Schlegel – Indology
- August Wilhelm Schlegel – Indology
- Arthur Schopenhauer – Philosophy
- Kurt Sethe – Egyptology – (Professor ordinarius)
- Hermann Spieckermann – biblical scholar, historian of ancient Near Eastern religion
- Philipp Albert Stapfer – Theology – (Student)
- Bassam Tibi – International Relations – (Professor ordinarius)
- Ulrich Trautwein – Psychology – Professor of Education Science, University of Tübingen
- Jürgen Trittin – Social Sciences – (Student, AStA-Member)
- Karl Heinrich Ulrichs – Law and Theology – pioneer of the gay rights movement
- Max Weber – Sociology
- Julius Wellhausen— Biblical scholar and orientalist – (Professor)
- Ji Xianlin – Linguistics – (Phd student, Assistant)

== Medicine ==
- Lykke Aresin – Medicine – Chief of Staff at the Leipzig University Women's Clinic; sexologist and writer
- Gottlieb Burckhardt – Medicine (psychiatry) – (Student) – first physician to perform modern psychosurgery (1888)
- Max Delbrück – Medicine – Nobel Prize in Medicine 1969
- Paul Ehrlich – Professor ordinarius (1904–1914) – Nobel Prize in Medicine 1908 (with Ilya Ilyich Mechnikov)
- Albrecht von Haller, Professor of Anatomy, Botanics and Surgery, (1708–1777, in Göttingen 1736–1753)
- Robert Koch – Medicine – (Student and doctorate in Göttingen) – Nobel Prize in Medicine 1905
- Hans Adolf Krebs – Medicine – (Student) – Nobel Prize in Medicine 1953
- Ilya Ilyich Mechnikov – Studies in Göttingen – Nobel Prize in Medicine 1908 (with Paul Ehrlich)
- Erwin Neher – Medicine – Nobel Prize in Medicine 1991 (with Bert Sakmann)
- Thomas Young – Medicine, Physics, Linguistics – (doctorate in Medicine)

== Other ==
- John T. Dorrance (1873–1930), inventor of Campbell's soup
- George Hanger, 4th Baron Coleraine (1751–1824), soldier, author and eccentric
- Otto Ohlendorf (1907–1951), SS general and Holocaust perpetrator, executed for war crimes
- Erich Roth (1910–1947), Nazi Gestapo member executed for war crimes
- Uwe Wolf (born 1961), musicologist

== List of Nobel prize winners ==
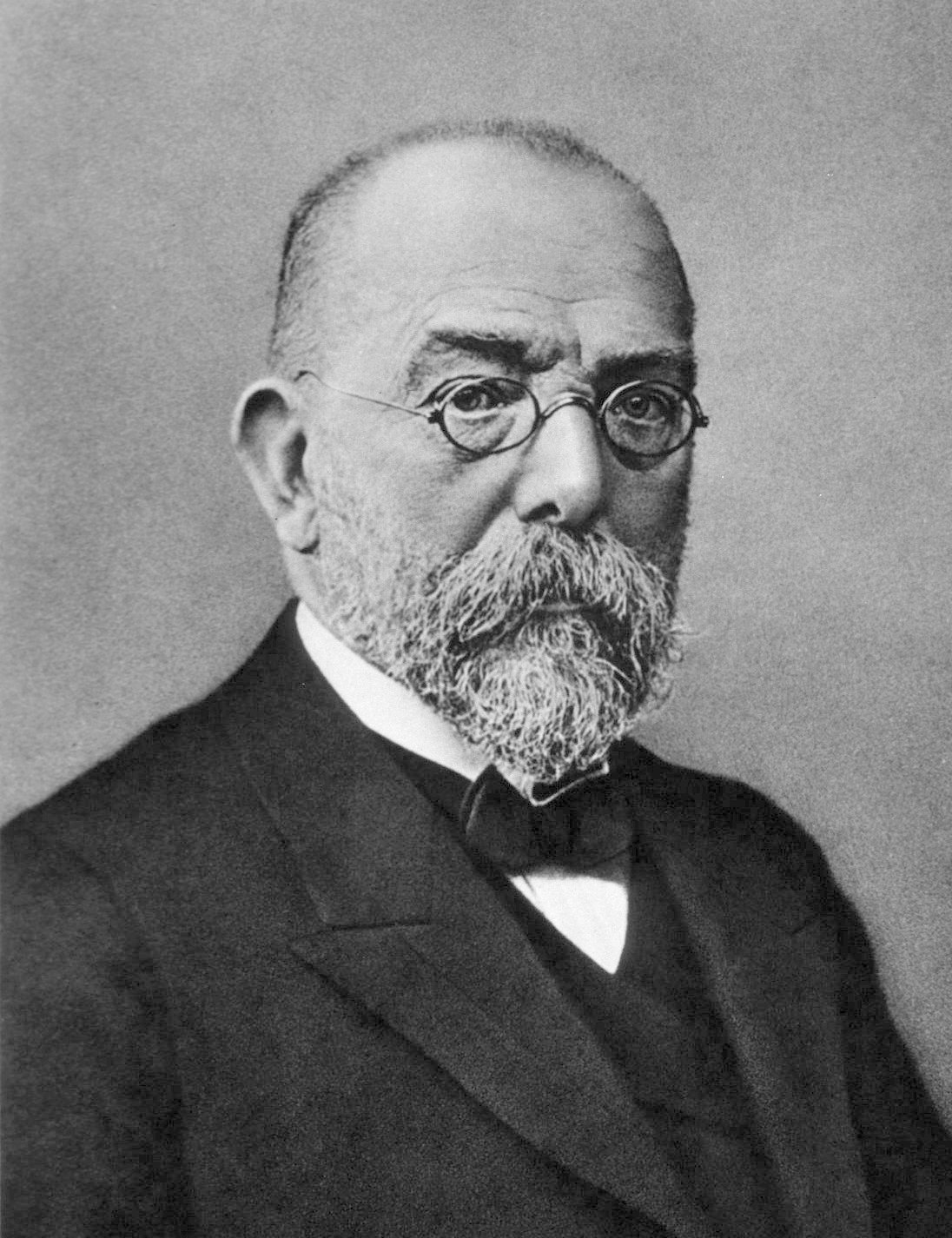
Robert Koch
microbiologist

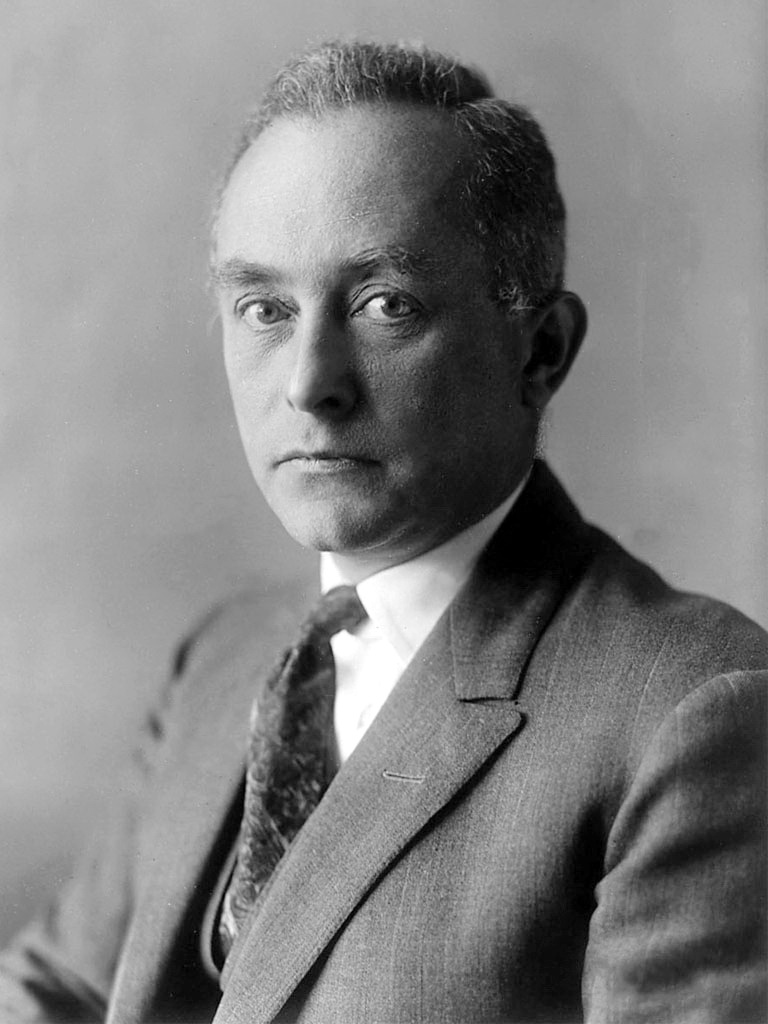
Max Born
physicist

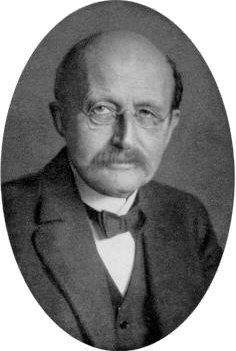
Max Planck
physicist

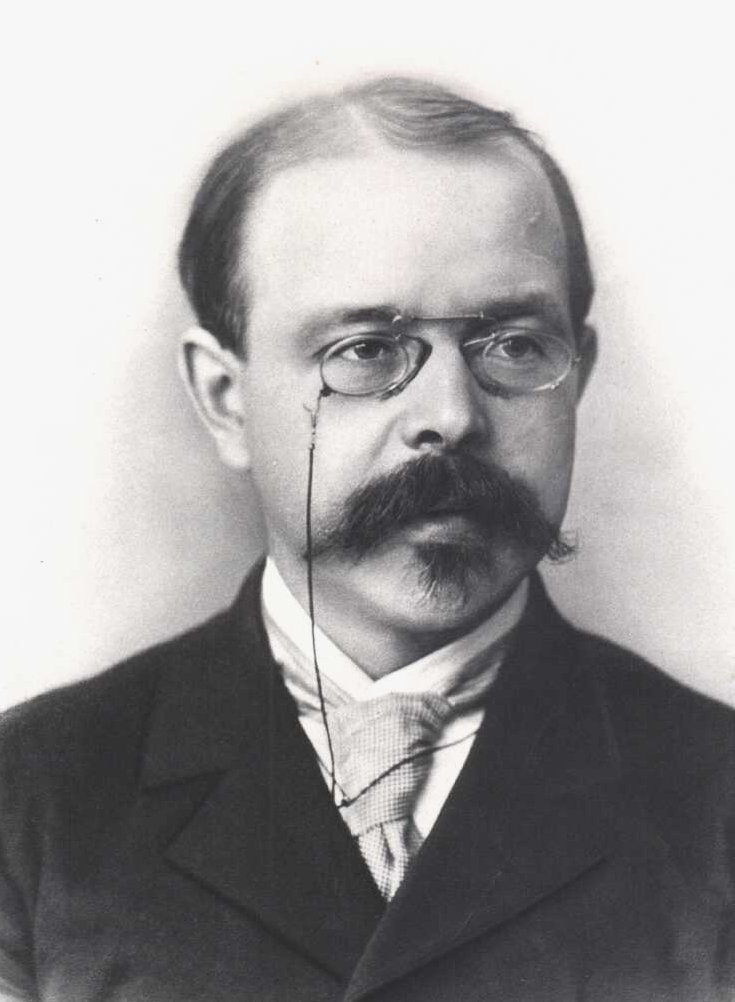
Walther Nernst
chemist

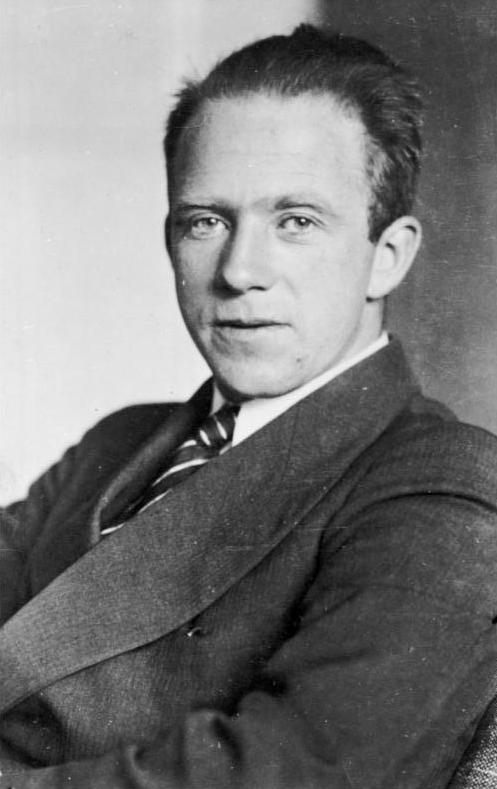
Werner Heisenberg
physicist

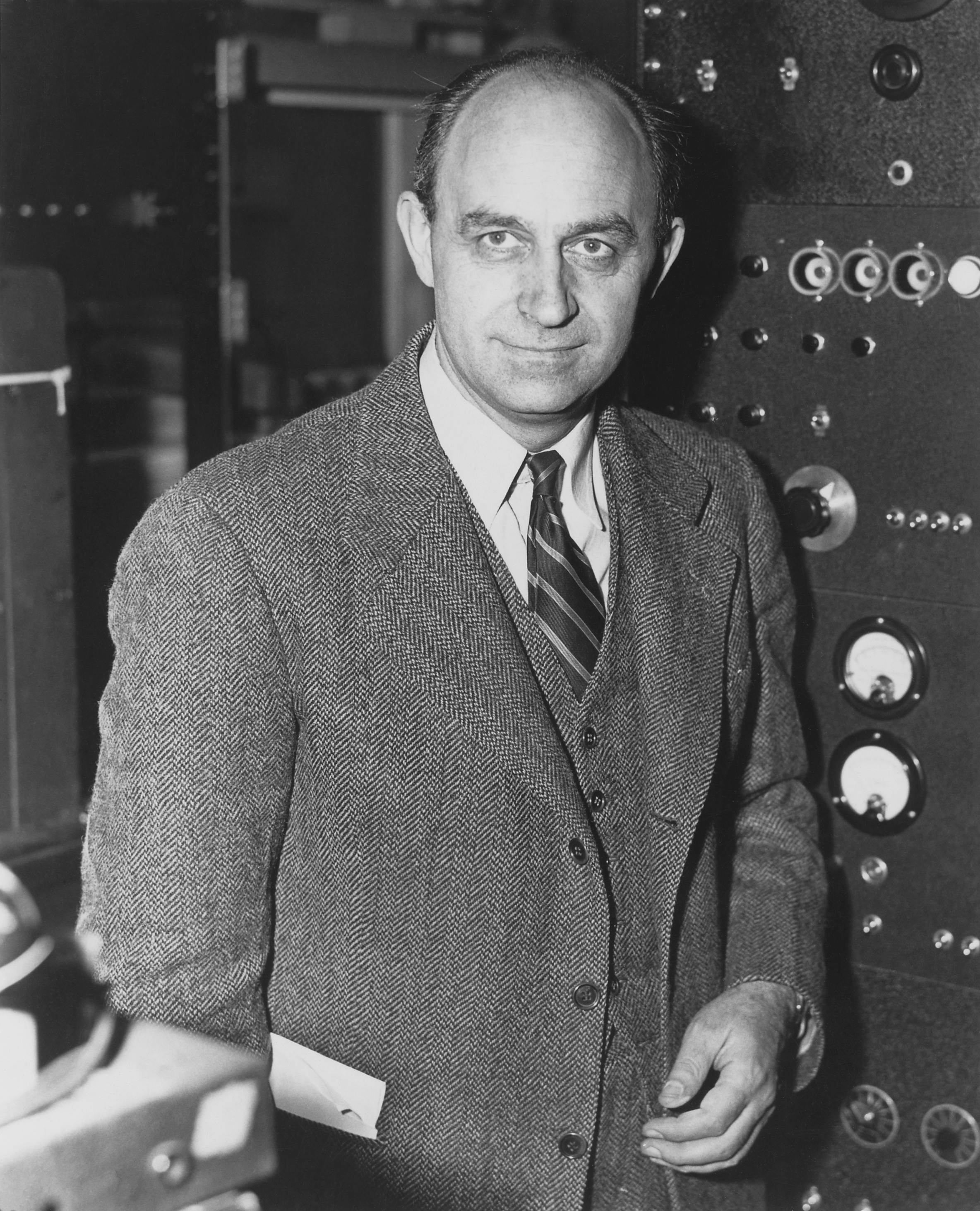
Enrico Fermi
physicist

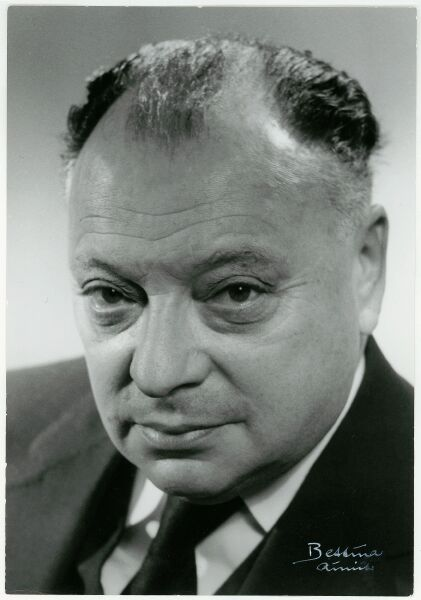
Wolfgang Pauli
physicist

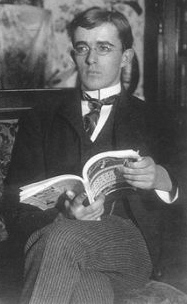
Irving Langmuir
chemist / physicist

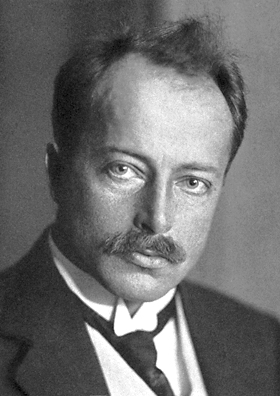
Max von Laue
physicist

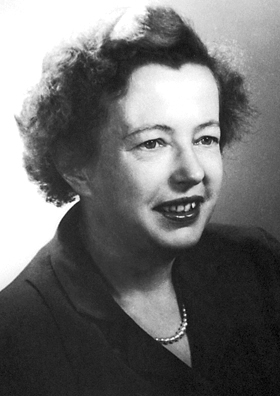
Maria Goeppert-Mayer
physicist

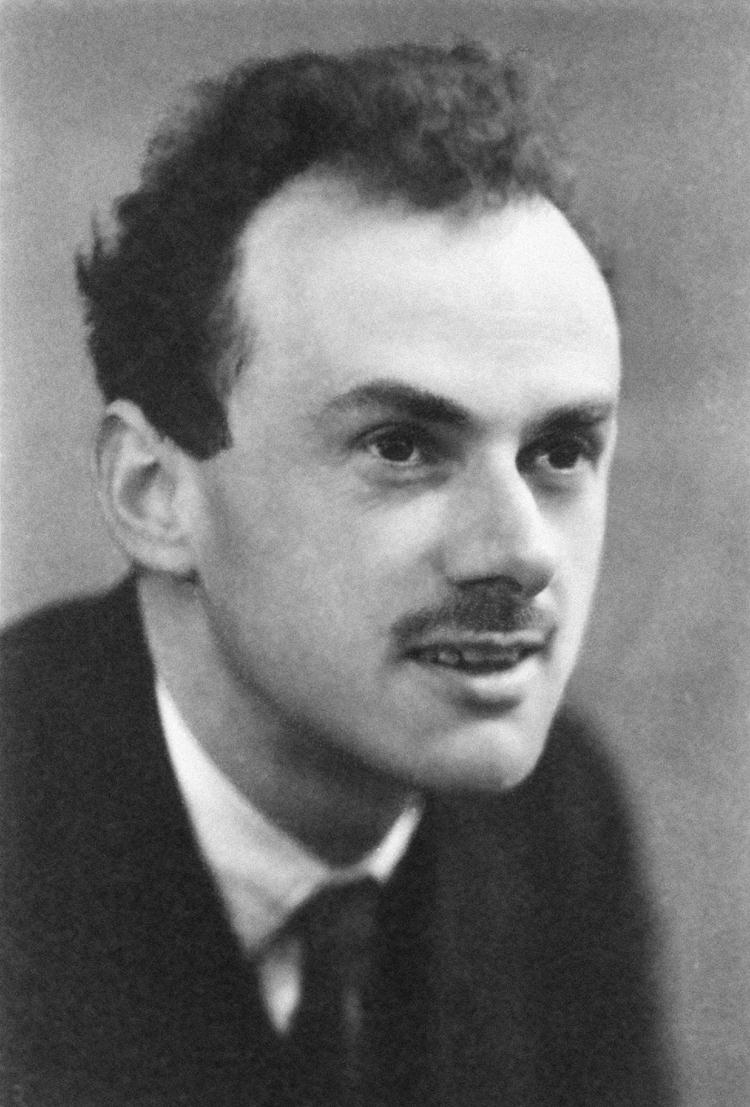
Paul Dirac
physicist

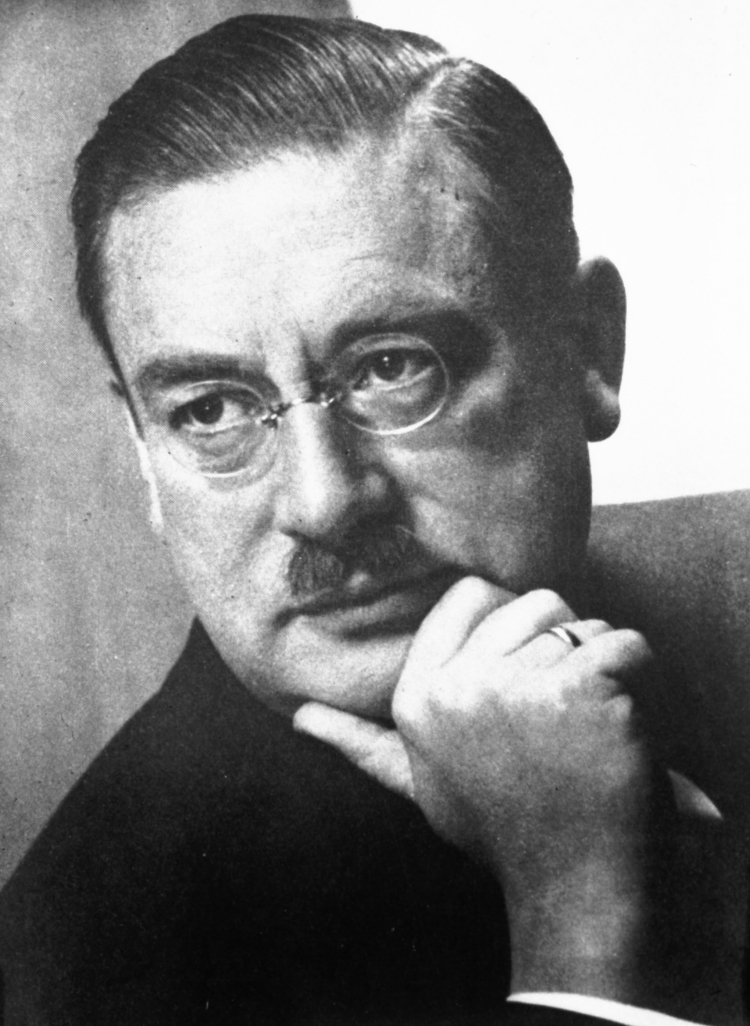
Peter Debye
physicist

To date, 45 Nobel Prize laureates have studied, taught or made contributions here. Most of these prizes were given in the first half of the 20th century, which was called the "Göttingen Nobel prize wonder".

Affiliations	Graduate	Attendee or Researcher	Academic staff before or at the time of award	Academic staff after award
Georg August University of Göttingen
50 (official 44)	1. [Ph.] Hans G. Dehmelt; 2. [Ph.] Herbert Kroemer; 3. [Ph.] Maria Goeppert-Mayer; 4. [Ph.] Max von Laue; 5. [Ph.] Werner Heisenberg; 6. [Ch.] Adolf Butenandt; 7. [Ch.] Irving Langmuir; 8. [Ch.] Manfred Eigen; 9. [Ch.] Walter Haworth; 10. [PM] Max Delbrück; 11. [PM] Robert Koch; 12. [PM] Élie Metchnikoff; 13. [PM] Thomas C. Südhof; 14. [Pe.] Ludwig Quidde; 15. [Li.] Rudolf Eucken	1. [Ph.] Enrico Fermi; 2. [Ph.] Gustav Ludwig Hertz; 3. [Ph.] Paul Dirac; 4. [Ph.] Robert A. Millikan; 5. [Ch.] Gerhard Herzberg; 6. [Ch.] Theodore William Richards; 7. [Ch.] Thomas A. Steitz; 8. [PM] Carol Greider; 9. [PM] Hans Krebs	1. [Ph.] Albert Einstein; 2. [Ph.] Eugene P. Wigner; 3. [Ph.] James Franck; 4. [Ph.] Johannes Stark; 5. [Ph.] Manne Siegbahn; 6. [Ph.] Max Born; 7. [Ph.] Max Planck; 8. [Ph.] Otto Stern; 9. [Ph.] Niels Bohr; 10. [Ph.] Patrick Blackett; 11. [Ph.] Walther Bothe; 12. [Ph.] Wilhelm Wien; 13. [Ph.] Wolfgang Paul; 14. [Ph.] Wolfgang Pauli; 15. [Ch.] Adolf Windaus; 16. [Ch.] Otto Hahn; 17. [Ch.] Otto Wallach; 18. [Ch.] Peter Debye; 19. [Ch.] Richard Adolf Zsigmondy; 20. [Ch.] Stefan Hell; 21. [Ch.] Walther Nernst; 22. [PM] Bert Sakmann; 23. [PM] Erwin Neher; 24. [PM] Paul Ehrlich; 25. [Pe.] Nathan Söderblom	1. [Ph.] Hendrik Lorentz
