= Trautwein =

Trautwein is a German surname. It may refer to:

- Dieter Trautwein (1928–2002), German Protestant theologian and hymnwriter
- Ernst Trautwein (born 1936), German ice hockey player
- Heinz Trautwein (1907–1944), German submariner and naval officer
- Hope Trautwein (born 1999), American softball player
- Jody Trautwein (born 1970), U.S. pastor and politician
- John Trautwein (born 1962), U.S. baseball pitcher
- Phil Trautwein (born 1986), U.S. football player
- Theodore Charles Trautwein (1869–1955), Australian politician
- Theodore Walter Trautwein (1920–2000), U.S. Judge
- Ulrich Trautwein (born 1972), German psychologist
- Wolfgang Trautwein (born 1961), German sports shooter
