= Christian Krell =

German political scientist

Christian Krell (born 20 December 1977 in Siegen) is a German political scientist and adult educator. He is a professor of political science and sociology at the HSPV NRW (Cologne) and honorary professor at the Rheinische Friedrich-Wilhelms-Universität Bonn.

== Career ==
Krell studied sociology, politics, history and economics at the University of Siegen and the University of York from 1997 to 2003. From 1998 to 2005 he received a scholarship from the Friedrich-Ebert-Foundation. Krell received his doctorate in 2006 with a comparative study of the European policies of British, German and French social democrats. From 2007 to 2016, Krell headed the Academy for Social Democracy of the Friedrich-Ebert-Foundation and in this function was the author and editor of numerous textbooks. In 2014 he was appointed to the Basic Values Commission of the SPD. Between 2016 and 2018, Christian Krell headed the Nordic Office of the Friedrich-Ebert-Foundation based in Stockholm and responsible for Sweden, Denmark, Finland, Iceland and Norway. One focus of his work was comparative welfare state research. In November 2018, Krell was appointed professor of constitutional law and politics at the Federal University for Public Administration. In April 2019, at the suggestion of the Faculty of Philosophy at the Rheinische Friedrich-Wilhelms-Universität Bonn, he was awarded the title of honorary professor. He previously worked as a lecturer at the University of Siegen. In October 2021, Krell accepted a call to the HSPV NRW (Cologne) and teaches political science and sociology there. Krell occasionally appears as an expert on current political issues for media such as BBC World, Deutschlandfunk and other broadcasters. In addition, Krell acts as a moderator. In this capacity, he moderated the Webtalk series "Looking out". Krell's interlocutors included the French economist Thomas Piketty, the German sociologists Andreas Reckwitz and Heinz Bude, the philosopher and social scientist Lisa Herzog and the Nobel Prize winner in economics Joseph E. Stiglitz.

== Research ==
The main research areas are party politics, democracy, comparative politics, Europe-related topics and the theory and practice of social democracy. In this context, Krell has published on various actors in the history of ideas. In addition, he considers current issues from a normative perspective, for example on digitization, basic income, inequality or the concept of solidarity. Krell is a member of the German Association for Political Science.

== Publications (selection) ==
- Thinkers of Social Democracy. Editor. (2016) Bonn. ISBN 978-3-8012-0482-2
- Vordenkerinnen und Vordenker der Sozialen Demokratie. Editor. (2015) Bonn. ISBN 978-3-8012-0459-4
- Werte und Politik. Edited with Tobias Mörschel (2015) Wiesbaden. ISBN 978-3-658-06606-2
- Freiheit, Gerechtigkeit und Solidarität in Zeiten der Digitalisierung In: Neue Gesellschaft/Frankfurter Hefte (1/2/2015). S. 68–71. ISSN 0177-6738
- Die Geschichte der Sozialen Demokratie With Michael Reschke und Jochen Dahm. (2013, 3. Auflage) Bonn. ISBN 978-3-86498-233-0
- Demokratie in Deutschland – Zustand, Herausforderungen, Perspektiven. Edited with Tobias Mörschel. (2012) Wiesbaden. ISBN 978-3-531-18582-8
- Zur wertepolitischen Verortung deutscher Parteien In: Neue Gesellschaft/Frankfurter Hefte (10/2012). p. 36–40. ISSN 0177-6738
- Mehr Gleichheit, mehr Bildung, mehr Europa – Die Demokratiedebatte in Deutschland. In: spw – Zeitschrift für sozialistische Politik und Wirtschaft. (06/2011). p. 13–21. ISSN 0170-4613
- Lessons learned? – Was man aus den sozialdemokratischen Reformdiskursen lernen kann In: Neue Gesellschaft/Frankfurter Hefte (05/2011). p. 77–79.
- Кризис германской социал-демократии: пять причин и способов его преодоления. Социал-демократия в современном мире. Материалы научно-практической конференции „Кризис европейской социал-демократии: причины, формы проявления, пути преодоления". Москва,2010. С. 75-89. (Russian translation of: Die Krise der deutschen Sozialdemokratie- Fünf Ursachen und fünf Handlungsansätze Sozialdemokratie in der modernen Welt. Ergebnisse der Konferenz „Die Krise der europäischen Sozialdemokratie: Ursachen, Erscheinungsformen, Handlungsansätze". Moskau [2010]. p. 75–89.)
- Sozialdemokratie und Europa – Die Europapolitik der britischen, deutschen und französischen Sozialdemokratie (2009) Wiesbaden. ISBN 9785364984
- Ein Kompass in bewegten Zeiten – Kompetenzvermittlung in der Akademie für Soziale Demokratie In: Praxis Politische Bildung (04/2008). p. 270–277. ISSN 1433-4755
- Laggard or Leader – Der britische Sozialstaat im Spiegel der sozialen Demokratie In: Meyer, Thomas (2006) (ed.): Praxis der Sozialen Demokratie. Wiesbaden. p. 130–241. ISBN 978-35311-51793
