= Iffert =

Surname

Iffert is a surname. Notable people with the surname include:

- John Iffert (born 1967), American Catholic bishop
- Mathias Iffert (born 1966), German educator and educational administrator
