= Frank Schirrmacher =

German journalist (1959–2014)

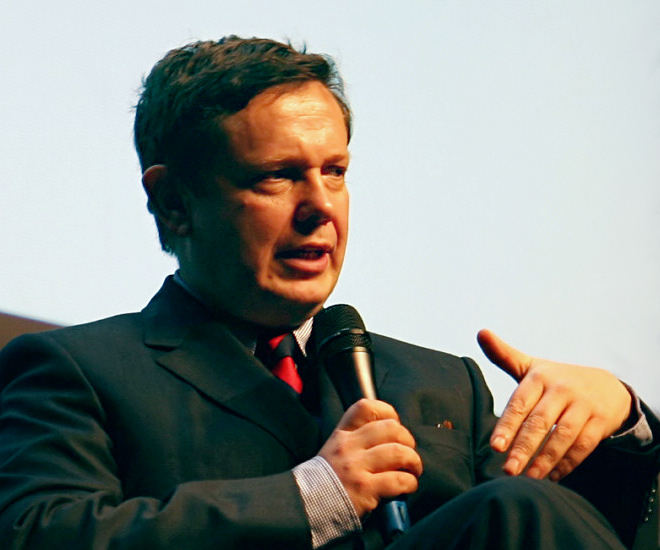
- Born: 5 September 1959; Wiesbaden, West Germany
- Died: 12 June 2014 (aged 54); Frankfurt am Main, Germany
- Education: University of Siegen; University of Heidelberg; University of Cambridge
- Occupation: Co-publisher of the FAZ

Frank Schirrmacher (5 September 1959 – 12 June 2014) was a German journalist, literature expert and essayist, writer, and from 1994 co-publisher of the national German newspaper Frankfurter Allgemeine Zeitung.

== Education ==
After studying German studies, English studies, and philosophy in Heidelberg and Cambridge, Schirrmacher joined the FAZ as editor of the feuilleton (literature and arts section) in 1985. In 1988, he received his doctorate for a work about Franz Kafka at the University of Siegen. Several years later, Der Spiegel criticized him for self-plagiarism in his dissertation—asserting that most of the text had already been used as his magister thesis and in a Suhrkamp book publication—, as well as for other inconsistent statements about his biography.

== Editor and publisher of FAZ ==
In 1989, Schirrmacher succeeded Marcel Reich-Ranicki as the director of the editorial staff of the FAZ's arts supplement – Feuilleton. In 1994, he succeeded Joachim Fest as one of the five publishers of the newspaper, responsible for the Feuilleton, Science and other parts. Under Schirrmacher's direction FAZ coverage of science and popular culture was expanded.

As the press boomed around 2000, Schirrmacher expanded the Feuilleton supplement, recruiting journalists from other newspapers. A few years later, however, he was forced to reduce the number of pages in the Feuilleton and for the first time in the history of the FAZ laid off employees.

== Public debates ==
Schirrmacher often influenced the public discussion in Germany of controversial topics such as the debates about genetic engineering and brain research and about the low birth rates in Germany and Europe. Newsweek named him one of Germany's leading intellectuals and Ray Kurzweil called Schirrmacher one of the "big thinkers".

Schirrmacher's roasting of Martin Walser's novel Tod eines Kritikers in 2002 caused a stir in the German press. Schirrmacher claimed the book, which was seen as a roman à clef centering on Schirrmacher's predecessor Reich-Ranicki (a German literature critic of Jewish ancestry), contained anti-semitic passages. He had reviewed the book before it came out, so the publishers changed the novel before publishing it, the first time a book review had this effect in German history.

In his 2004 book Das Methusalem-Komplott, published in 14 languages and selling more than 1 million copies in Germany, Schirrmacher prognosticated the ageing of society as a result of low birth rates and calling for an "uprising of the old". He received the Goldene Feder award for this book. In 2006, Minimum was published, which became a bestseller too. The title refers to Schirrmacher's assertion that the family was dissolving as the smallest cell of society, resulting in diminution of social relationships to a minimum. To prove the superiority of the family, he cites the event of the Donner Party, resorted to cannibalism. Critics claimed that he exaggerated the statistics and that he supported a conservative view of the family. Through a PR campaign which included publishing some passages in Der Spiegel and Bild-Zeitung, the book caused another media debate about the topic.

In a 2006 interview with Schirrmacher, Nobel laureate Günter Grass admitted to have served in the Waffen-SS as a young man. Grass made the admission in a conversation about his new autobiography, Peeling the Onion, saying he had been drafted at the age of 17 into the Waffen-SS—the combat force of the SS—in the final months of World War II. The interview stirred up a worldwide debate and forced Grass' publisher to publish the book earlier than intended.

Schirrmacher died on 12 June 2014 following a cardiac arrest, at the age of 54.

== Honours ==
Among other awards and honours, Schirrmacher received the International Corinne Book Prize, and in 2007 he was awarded the "Kulturpreis Deutsche Sprache" which is among the highest cultural prizes in the German-speaking world.
