= Stefanie Reese =

German engineer and academic administrator

Stefanie Reese is a German engineering professor and academic administrator, a professor emeritus of applied mathematics and former dean of civil engineering at RWTH Aachen University and the rector of the University of Siegen. Her research has concerned the use of the finite element method in computational mechanics, especially for elastic solids such as rubber.

== Education and career ==
Reese was a secondary school student at Viktoria-Luise-Gymnasium in Hamelin. She studied civil engineering at Leibniz University Hannover, where she received a diploma (the German equivalent of a master's degree) in 1990. She completed a Ph.D. in 1994 through the Institute of Mechanics at Technische Universität Darmstadt under the supervision of Peter Wriggers.

After postdoctoral research at the University of California, Berkeley, she took an assistant professorship at TU Darmstadt in 1996. She moved to the Institute of Structural and Computational Mechanics at Leibniz University Hannover in 1998, and received a habilitation there in 2000. From 2000 to 2005 she was associate professor at Ruhr University Bochum, and in 2005 she became a full professor of mechanical engineering in the Institute of Solid Mechanics at TU Braunschweig. She moved to RWTH Aachen University in 2009 as a professor in the Department of Civil Engineering and as head of the Institute of Applied Mechanics.

At RWTH Aachen University, she became dean of civil engineering in 2021. In 2023, she was elected as rector of the University of Siegen, continuing to hold an emeritus professorship at RWTH Aachen University.

== Recognition ==
Reese became a corresponding member of the Braunschweigische Wissenschaftliche Gesellschaft in 2009, a Fellow of the International Association for Computational Mechanics in 2010, a member of the North Rhine-Westphalian Academy of Sciences, Humanities and the Arts in 2013, and a member of acatech, the German Academy of Science and Engineering, in 2014.
