= Mathias Iffert =

German educator and educational administrator

Mathias Iffert (born 21 September 1966 in Schmalkalden) is a German educator, educational researcher and educational administrator. He is the founding director of the Landesinstitut Brandenburg für Schule und Lehrkräftebildung (LIBRA).

== Life and education ==
Iffert studied German and history for the teaching profession at grammar schools at the University of Potsdam and the University of Siegen. He subsequently completed doctoral studies at the University of Potsdam and received a doctorate (Dr. phil.) in history didactics in 2004.

His dissertation is titled Die Inhaltsstruktur des Geschichtsbewusstseins. Empirische rekonstruktionslogische Analyse und Theoriebildung and was published by Verlag Dr. Kovač in 2005.

== Professional career ==
After completing his preparatory service at the Studienseminar Potsdam from 1998 to 2000, Iffert worked from 2000 to 2005 as a teacher of German, history and drama at the Sportschule Potsdam “Friedrich Ludwig Jahn”.

From 2002 to 2009 he worked as an instructor in teacher training at the Studienseminar Potsdam. Together with Detlef Kölln and Carola Kreißig, he developed the concept of Ausbildungscoaching, which provides for a separation of counselling and assessment in preparatory teacher training.

From 2009 to 2023 he headed the Studienseminar Potsdam.

In 2023 Iffert became director of the Landesinstitut für Schule und Medien Berlin-Brandenburg (LISUM). After the dissolution of LISUM at the end of 2024, he became founding director of the newly established Landesinstitut Brandenburg für Schule und Lehrkräftebildung (LIBRA) on 1 January 2025.

== Cultural engagement ==
Alongside his work in education, Iffert has been active in the cultural scene of Potsdam, particularly at the Theaterschiff Potsdam. He was chairman of the theatre ship's supporting association and was involved in its programmatic and structural development.

He also worked there as both an actor and theatre director. Before directing, he had already appeared on stage as an actor. In 2011 he directed König Ödipus for the first time.

His theatre work was connected to his work as a teacher; at his school he expanded the field of drama education. The theatre also served him as a practical field of experience for educational questions, particularly regarding perspective-taking and self-reflection.

As chairman of the association, he was also involved in the theatre ship's artistic reorientation, which aimed to combine entertainment with more demanding drama.

Further appearances as an actor are documented for the productions Die Legende vom heiligen Trinker after a novella by Joseph Roth (2017) and Knocking on Angel's Door.

== Selected works ==
- with Dagmar Klose: Zeit- und Menschenläufe im 20. Jahrhundert. Subjektive Orientierungen und historischer Sinn. (= Potsdamer Studien, vol. 13). Verlag für Berlin-Brandenburg, Potsdam 1999. ISBN 3-932981-58-8.
- Die Inhaltsstruktur des Geschichtsbewusstseins. Empirische rekonstruktionslogische Analyse und Theoriebildung. Verlag Dr. Kovač, Hamburg 2005. ISBN 3-8300-1748-0.
- with Detlef Kölln and Carola Kreißig: Ausbildungscoaching. Individualisierung und Eigenverantwortung in der Lehrer*innenausbildung. Beltz Juventa, Weinheim/Basel 2023. ISBN 978-3-7799-7151-1.
- with Detlef Kölln and Carola Kreißig: “Ausbildungscoaching – ein Konzept für mehr Eigenverantwortung in der Ausbildung von Lehrpersonen”. In: Lehren & Lernen, vol. 50, no. 4, 2024, pp. 13–19.
