= Christiane Volger =

German forestry biologist

- Born: 6 August 1917; Oldenburg, Germany
- Died: 17 September 2008 (aged 91); Münster, Germany
- Scientific career
- Fields: forestry
- Workplaces: University of Göttingen
- Theses: The Oedelsheim Forestry Office - a forest area in Lower Hesse - under the influence of human settlement and exploitation as well as a pioneering management over the centuries. (Das Forstamt Oedelsheim – ein niederhessisches Waldgebiet – unter dem Einfluß menschlicher Siedlung und Ausbeutung sowie einer wegsuchenden Bewirtschaftung im Wandel der Jahrhunderte.) (1954); The bracken (Pteridium aquilinum L. Kuhn) and its control with aminotriazole. (Der Adlerfarn (Pteridium aquilinum L. Kuhn) und seine Bekämpfung mit Aminotriazol.) (1969)

Christiane Volger (1917–2008) was a German forest scientist at University of Göttingen who undertook some of the early physiological studies of the effect of herbicide on bracken in the 1960s.

== Education and personal life ==
Christiane Volger was born 6 August 1917 in Oldenburg. Her father, Hans Volger, was a professional forester and she, unusually for a woman at that time, pursued a career in forestry. She studied forestry at the Royal Prussian Forestry Academy in Münden (incorporated into the Georg August University of Göttingen from 1939) and the Albert Ludwig University in Freiburg. In 1954 she was awarded a doctorate for a dissertation on the history of forestry in the Oedelsheim an der Weser region. In 1969 she obtained her Habilitation for a thesis on Bracken and its control with aminotriazole (Der Adlerfarn und seine Bekämpfung mit Aminotriazol) about the fern bracken.

She died 17 September 2008 at the age of 91.

== Forestry career ==
From 1943 to 1948 Volger worked at the Royal Prussian Forestry Academy as a research assistant to Julius Oelkers, head of the Institute for Silviculture (Institut für Waldbau) within the academy (later University of Göttingen). She continued as a research assistant under his successor, Adolf Olberg. In 1954 she was awarded her doctorate for a dissertation on the history of forestry in the Oedelsheim an der Weser region, a topic suggested by Olberg.

Her own research then moved into forest protection, especially applications of phytopathology. She studied treatments to protect conifer seedlings from disease and also the fungi that caused these diseases. In 1962 Volger brought these studies together a series of publications Methods of Soil Disinfection and its Importance for the Cultivation of Forest Plants (Verfahren der Bodenentseuchung und ihre Bedeutung für die Anzucht von Forstpflanzen). She also researched regeneration of land after plantations were cleared, particularly control of bracken. She studied the biology of the fern and how aminotriazole herbicides were translocation by the plant. This involved the use of radioactive tracers and paper chromatographic methods to follow the plant processes. She supervised the research of over 20 students leading to the award of doctoral degrees during her research into these subjects.

In 1973, Christiane Volger became a Professor and in 1978 took over the teaching and research of the subject of forest protection at the Institute of Silviculture until her retirement in 1983. She was chair of the faculty library committee and the "Science and Literature" association.

== Publications ==
Volger's scientific publications include:

- Butin, H., Volger, C. (1982) Studies on the origin of stem cracks ("frost cracks") in oak trees (Untersuchungen über die Entstehung von Stammrissen («Frostrissen») an Eiche). Forstwissenschaftliches Centralblatt 101 pp. 295–303.
- Volger, Christiane. (1962) Soil decontamination processes and their importance for the cultivation of forest plants. (Verfahren der Bodenentseuchung und ihre Bedeutung für die Anzucht von Forstpflanzen.) Schriftenreihe der Forstlichen Fakultät der Universität Göttingen und Mitteilungen der Niedersächsischen Forstlichen Versuchsanstalt (Band 26), Frankfurt am Main.
- Volger, Christiane. (1969) The bracken (Pteridium aquilinum L. Kuhn) and its control with aminotriazole. (Der Adlerfarn (Pteridium aquilinum L. Kuhn) und seine Bekämpfung mit Aminotriazol.) Habilitation thesis as a series of publications from the Forestry Faculty of University of Göttingen and the Lower Saxony Forest Research Institute (Volume 41), Frankfurt am Main
- Volger, Christiane. (1959) Experiments on defense and control of seedling mycoses on conifers. (Versuche liber Abwehr and Bekampfung von Keimlingsmykosen an Koniferen.) Forstarchiv 30 (2) pp 29–34.
- Volger, Christiane. (1959) About the possibility of a systemic effect of TMTD preparations (Uber die Moglichkeit einer systemischen Wirkung von TMTD Präparaten.) Ghent, Landbouwhoogeschool van den Staat, Mededelingen de Opzoekingsstations 24 (3–4) pp 837–849.
- Volger, Christiane. (1957) Problems of combating fungal-parasitic seedling diseases in conifers. (Probleme der Bekampfung von pilz-parasitren Keimlingskrankheiten bei Nadelbumen.) Ghent, Landbouwhoogeschool van den Staat, Mededelingen de Opzoekingsstations 22 (3) pp 517–525.
