= Ulrich Walter (clinical biochemist) =

German physician and biomedical scientist

- Born: September 17, 1949 (age 77)
- Occupations: Physician and biomedical scientist

Academic background
- Education: MD; Habilitation in Clinical Biochemistry
- Alma mater: University of Göttingen; University of Würzburg

Academic work
- Institutions: Johannes Gutenberg University Mainz

Ulrich Walter (born 1949) is a physician and biomedical scientist. He is Professor Emeritus of the Center for Thrombosis and Hemostasis (CTH) in the University Medical Center at Johannes Gutenberg University Mainz.

Walter is most known for his contributions to biochemistry, clinical biochemistry, and cardiovascular medicine, particularly in the field of hemostaseology. His work focuses on the regulation and function of protein kinases and protein phosphorylation in cardiovascular cells with special emphasis on human platelets and their role in hemostasis and thrombosis. He and colleagues applied advanced functional proteomics and phosphoproteomics to understand the Kinome (all protein kinases) and their signal transduction network in human platelets.

== Education and career ==
Walter studied medicine at the University of Göttingen (Germany) from 1968 to 1975, completing his medical education and an MD dissertation in Clinical Biochemistry under the supervision of HD Söling. In 1971 and 1972, he studied biochemistry at Brandeis University in Massachusetts with JM Lowenstein and others. From 1975 to 1980, he was a Postdoctoral Associate in pharmacology at Yale University, working in the group of Paul Greengard. He continued this research with a DFG Heisenberg Fellowship at Julius-Maximilians-Universität Würzburg (JMU) and the University of Texas (Houston), leading to his Habilitation in Clinical Biochemistry at the University of Würzburg in 1985. In 1995, he was appointed Full Professor/Chair of the Institute for Clinical Biochemistry and Pathobiochemistry at the University Hospital Würzburg. In 2012, he was recruited as Full Professor and Director of the newly founded Center of Thrombosis and Hemostasis (CTH), Johannes Gutenberg University (JGU) Mainz, where he serves since 2015 as a professor emeritus.

Between 2001 and 2011, Walter directed the Central Laboratory/Clinical Chemistry at University Medical Center Würzburg. He served, together with Frits Rosendaal (Leiden), as congress president for the 1st Joint Thrombosis & Hemostasis Meeting GTH+NVTH 2010 in Nürnberg, and subsequently as vice-president of the Society for Thrombosis and Hemostasis (GTH) from 2011 to 2015. He was the Scientific Secretary at the Foundation for Pathobiochemistry & Molecular Diagnostics. Moreover, together with Harald Schmidt, he founded Vasopharm (Würzburg) to develop novel diagnostics for vascular diseases and treatments for traumatic brain injury (TBI) using allosteric iNOS inhibitors.

== Research ==
Walter's research focused on the characterization, regulation and function of protein kinases (especially PKA, PKG) and protein phosphorylation in human platelets and cardiovascular cells. His research has been focused on elucidating therapeutically important inhibitory pathways in platelets cells using functional, biochemical and phosphoproteomic approaches.

=== Protein kinases and platelet inhibitory pathways ===
Walter's early work addressed the heterogeneity of both PKA and PKG which led to the cloning and further characterization of the PKA regulatory subunit RIIß PKGIß, and PKG II. Other milestones were the discovery of PKA regulatory subunit (RII) binding proteins subsequently classified by others as A-kinase anchoring proteins (AKAPs), which define cellular PKA responses.

Efforts to elucidate cAMP/cGMP mechanisms in cardiovascular cells were then directed to identify selective PKA and/or PKG substrates and targets. A collaborative study showed that cyclic GMP/PKG inhibit the L-type Ca2(+)-channel current (ICa) in rat cardiac ventricular cells, which opposes the stimulating effects of cAMP/PKA in heart function.

=== Role of PKA, PKG, and VASP in platelet inhibition ===
Seeking to define the mechanisms of platelet inhibitors, Walter's group discovered platelet PKG and VASP (vasodilator-stimulated phosphoprotein). VASP was phosphorylated in repose to cAMP- and cGMP-elevating platelet vasodilators, which also inhibit platelet activation. Subsequently, three VASP phosphorylation sites and a distinct PKA-/PKG-dependent phosphorylation pattern in human platelets was established, with implications for platelet inhibition and vascular mechanisms. Molecular cloning and further studies identified VASP as adapter protein and proline-rich ligand for profilins, playing a key role in both actin filament dynamics and signal transduction. Moreover, a proline-rich motif in listerial ActA that binds EVH1 domain of VASP and other proteins, was discovered and functionally characterized. This is crucial for actin remodeling, bacterial motility, and Listeria virulence.

=== Analysis of the NO/cGMP/PKG pathway and other signaling routes ===
Walter's work also demonstrated the utility of the VASP phosphorylation assays to identify critical signaling pathways which are often impaired in diseases and targeted by therapeutics. It was shown that the NO/cGMP/PKG pathway potently inhibits agonist- and in particular ADP-evoked calcium elevation and activation of human platelets. Human platelets have 3 distinct ADP receptors which are differentially affected by cGMP/PKG, cAMP/PKA and thienopyridine-based platelet inhibitors such as clopidogrel. Importantly, only the clopidogrel-sensitive ADP receptor, P2Y12, inhibits the cAMP/PKA pathway and concomitant VASP phosphorylation, which can be monitored by the VASP phosphorylation assay. It was also noted that a subgroup of clopidogrel-treated patients did not respond to this clinically used ADP receptor blocker, which was confirmed by multiple follow-up studies leading to improved ADP receptor blockers and their clinical application. Also, the PKG selective VASP S239 phosphorylation site was used to quantify NO/cGMP/PKG signaling in physiological and pathophysiological conditions.

=== Network of platelet protein kinases, phosphatases, and their phosphorylation dynamics ===
Walter initiated a series of proteomic and phosphoproteomic studies on human platelets. This established for human platelets, small, anucleate cells, the first comprehensive human platelet proteome of ~4,000 proteins containing hundreds of distinct protein kinases, protein phosphatases and other signaling proteins. Subsequent phosphoproteomic studies revealed that stimulation of prostacyclin/cAMP-, NO/cGMP- and ADP-pathways detected hundreds of distinct, up-, but also down-regulated phosphosites in human platelets, whose functional roles are only partially clarified. These and recent studies indicate that activation or inhibition of human platelets is not achieved by single/few protein kinases /phosphorylation events, but by a network of interacting serine/threonine/tyrosine protein kinases/phosphatases which are also targeted by many clinically used protein kinase inhibitors.

== Awards and honors ==
As student (1971/1972), Walter received a Fulbright/Wien Scholarship to study biochemistry at Brandeis University. Subsequently, Walter has been awarded multiple personal and research project grants by the German Research Foundation (DFG), German Federal Ministry of Education and Research (BMBF) and other institutions. The DFG awarded him a Postdoctoral Fellowship for research at Yale University (1975), a Heisenberg Professorship (1980) and a Clinical Research Professorship (Würzburg University,1989). In 1995, he was awarded the GlaxoSmithKline foundation prize for clinical research. In 2004, he was elected to the German National Academy of Science, Leopoldina, section of Human Genetics and Molecular Medicine.

== Selected articles ==
- Schmidt, H. H., Lohmann, S. M., & Walter, U. (1993). The nitric oxide and cGMP signal transduction system: regulation and mechanism of action. Biochimica et Biophysica Acta (BBA)-Molecular Cell Research, 1178(2), 153–175.
- Schmidt, H. H., & Walter, U. (1994). NO at work. Cell, 78(6), 919–925.
- Mollnau, H., Wendt, M., Szöcs, K., Lassègue, B., Schulz, E., Oelze, M., ... & Münzel, T. (2002). Effects of angiotensin II infusion on the expression and function of NAD (P) H oxidase and components of nitric oxide/cGMP signaling. Circulation research, 90(4), e58-e65.
- Barragan, P., Bouvier, J. L., Roquebert, P. O., Macaluso, G., Commeau, P., Comet, B., ... & Eigenthaler, M. (2003). Resistance to thienopyridines: clinical detection of coronary stent thrombosis by monitoring of vasodilator‐stimulated phosphoprotein phosphorylation. Catheterization and cardiovascular interventions, 59(3), 295–302.
- Burkhart, J. M., Vaudel, M., Gambaryan, S., Radau, S., Walter, U., Martens, L., ... & Zahedi, R. P. (2012). The first comprehensive and quantitative analysis of human platelet protein composition allows the comparative analysis of structural and functional pathways. Blood, The Journal of the American Society of Hematology, 120(15), e73-e82.
