= Stefan Bräse =

German chemist

- Born: Germany

Academic background
- Education: University of Göttingen; University College of North Wales

Academic work
- Institutions: Karlsruhe Institute of Technology (KIT)

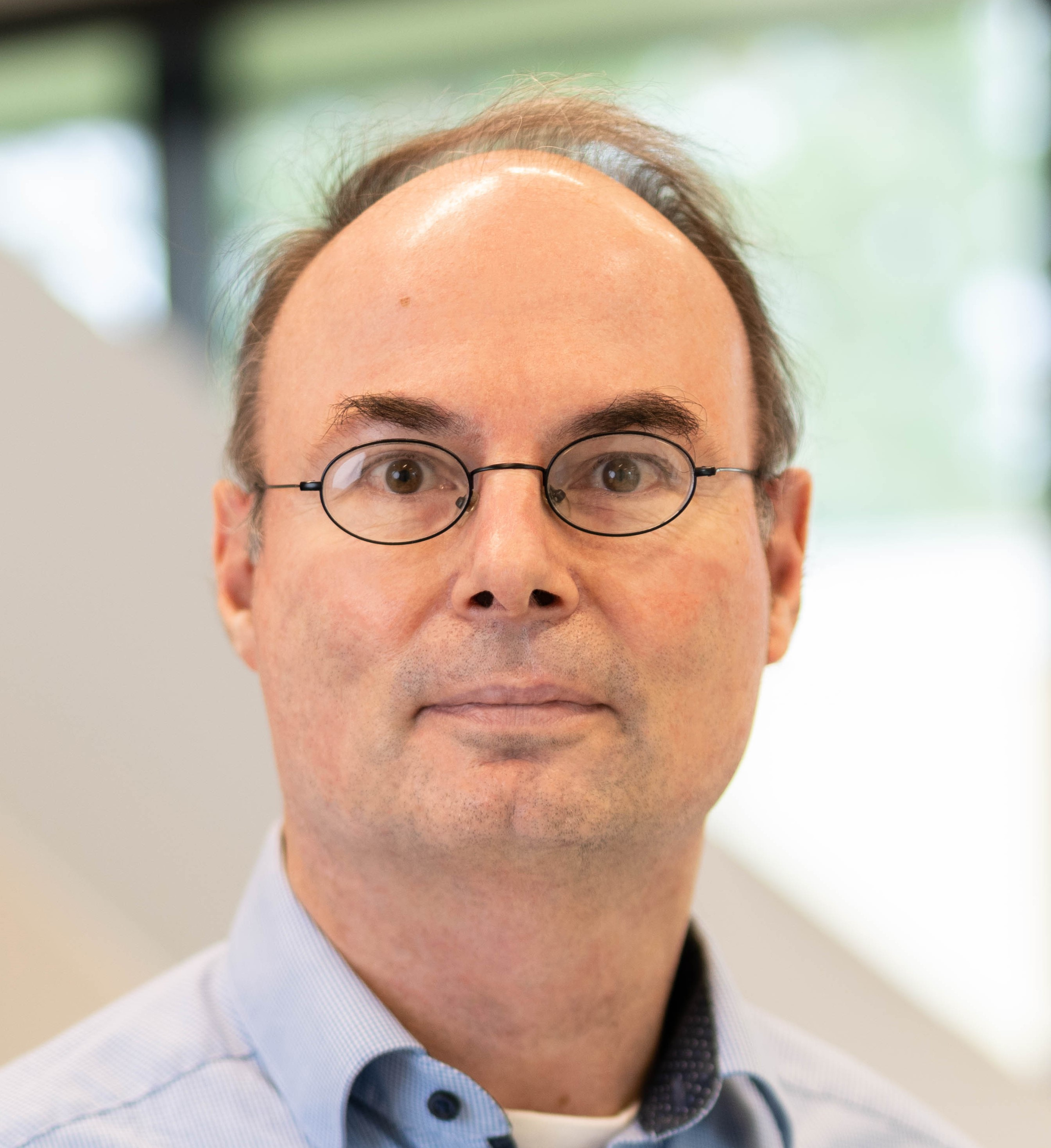

Stefan Bräse (Brase/Braese) is a German chemist and an academic. He is the Director of the Institute of Biological and Chemical Systems, Co-Director of the Soft Matter Synthesis Lab and a Full Professor at Karlsruhe Institute of Technology (KIT).

Bräse's research focuses on asymmetric synthesis, innovative combinatorial chemistry methods for biologically active compounds and catalysis, natural product synthesis on solid supports, including THC and Secalonic Acids, and functionalized nanostructures. His works have been published in academic journals, including Advanced Materials and Angewandte Chemie International Edition. Moreover, he received the 2019 Aspire Award with Nicole Jung and R. Bach.

Bräse is an Associate Editor of the journal Beilstein Journal of Organic Chemistry.

== Education and career ==
Bräse completed his chemistry studies at the University of Göttingen, Germany, and the University College of North Wales, Bangor, United Kingdom, in 1992 and obtained his Ph.D. at Göttingen in 1995. He spent his postdoc with Jan Bäckvall and K. C. Nicolaou from 1995 to 1998. He obtained his habilitation from RWTH Aachen University in 2001. From 2001 to 2003, he was a Professor at the University of Bonn. In 2003, he was appointed Head of the Department of Organic Chemistry (Institut für Organische Chemie) at the University of Karlsruhe (TH). Between 2004 and 2007, he held the position of Vertrauensdozent for Lehramt Chemie at the University of Karlsruhe. From 2007 to 2012, he also held the role of Trust Professor of the German Research Foundation (DFG) at the University of Karlsruhe (now KIT). Between 2012 and 2019, he was the Director of the Institute of Toxicology and Genetics at KIT and the Managing Director of Heika, a research alliance between Heidelberg University and KIT, from 2012 to 2016. He has been a Full Professor at KIT since 2003.

== Research ==
Bräse's research contributions span different areas of chemistry. His early work focused on synthetic organic chemistry, particularly the development of novel reaction methodologies. In 1996, he detailed a domino Heck-Diels-Alder reaction, enabling the synthesis of bicyclo[4.3.0]nonenes and bicyclo[4.4.0]decenes with high efficiency. This work introduced intramolecular Heck reactions involving bromomethylene cyclopropane systems without ring-opening, thereby expanding the boundaries of cyclopropane chemistry. Three years later, he explored the chemistry and biology of glycopeptide antibiotics, emphasizing their critical role in combating drug-resistant bacteria and the need for deeper insights to develop novel antibiotics. In subsequent years, his work broadened to include azide chemistry. In 2005, he reviewed the synthetic utility of organic azides, underlining their central role in cycloaddition reactions, heterocycle synthesis, and applications across chemistry, biology, and material sciences.

Bräse also made contributions to amino acid synthesis. A 2007 review analyzed advancements in the asymmetric synthesis of α,α-disubstituted α-amino acids. The oxa-Michael reaction was another focus of his research. In 2008, he detailed advancements that improved the reaction's reactivity and selectivity.

From 2010 onward, Bräse's work included material sciences and applied chemistry. He explored porous polymer networks (PPNs) for gas storage and separation, emphasizing their potential for clean energy applications. In 2012, his synthesis of luminescent dinuclear copper(I) complexes demonstrated their potential in OLED technology, with tunable photoluminescence and high quantum yields. One of his reviews, published in 2018 emphasized alternatives to iridium-based emitters, focusing on sustainable copper and zinc complexes, while a 2021 publication documented the evolution of OLED technologies, from fluorescence to advanced delayed fluorescence emitters. In 2023, he examined the chemistry of photochemically activated 3D printing inks, assessing the advancements and challenges in designing high-efficiency photoresists. In 2024, he received an ERC Synergy grant with colleagues from the University of Jena and École Polytechnique Fédérale de Lausanne for the development of innovative photonic devices.

== Awards and honors ==
- 1995 – Richard-Zsigmondy prize, Deutsche Kolloid-Gesellschaft
- 2000 – ORCHEM Prize for Natural Scientists, Gesellschaft Deutscher Chemiker
- 2019 – Aspire Award
- 2024 - ERC Synergy grant
- 2026 - UNIPRENEURS award

== Bibliography ==
=== Books ===
- Organic Azides: Syntheses and Applications (2009) ISBN 9780470519981
- Asymmetric Synthesis II: More Methods and Applications (2013) ISBN 9783527672592
- Privileged Scaffolds in Medicinal Chemistry: Design, Synthesis, Evaluation (2015) ISBN 9781782620303

=== Selected articles ===
- Nicolaou, K. C., Boddy, C. N., Bräse, S., & Winssinger, N. (1999). Chemistry, biology, and medicine of the glycopeptide antibiotics. Angewandte Chemie International Edition, 38(15), 2096-2152.
- Bräse, S., Gil, C., Knepper, K., & Zimmermann, V. (2005). Organic azides: an exploding diversity of a unique class of compounds. Angewandte Chemie International Edition, 44(33), 5188-5240.
- Nising, C. F., & Bräse, S. (2008). The oxa-Michael reaction: from recent developments to applications in natural product synthesis. Chemical Society Reviews, 37(6), 1218-1228.
- Nising, C. F., & Bräse, S. (2012). Recent developments in the field of oxa-Michael reactions. Chemical Society Reviews, 41(3), 988-999.
- Hong, G., Gan, X., Leonhardt, C., Zhang, Z., Seibert, J., Busch, J. M., & Bräse, S. (2021). A brief history of OLEDs—emitter development and industry milestones. Advanced Materials, 33(9), 2005630.
