= Jody Trautwein =

American pastor

Jody Lee Trautwein (born August 1970) is an American pastor, known for appearing in Sacha Baron Cohen's Brüno. A member of the Republican Party, Trautwein is a supporter of conversion therapy and was a candidate for Mayor of Birmingham, Alabama.

== Early life ==
Trautwein graduated from Huffman High School in 1988, then received his bachelor's degree in business management from the University of Alabama at Birmingham in 1995.

== Career ==
Trautwein was a coach and substitute teacher at Huffman High School, and then teacher at Cathedral Christian School. He was formerly the director of the Alabama Coalition Against Same Sex Marriage and is currently an associate pastor, church administrator and bookkeeper at House of Grace Church in Birmingham, Alabama. Trautwein campaigned in support of Alabama's Sanctity of Marriage Act in 2006.

Trautwein announced his candidacy for mayor of Birmingham in November 2009 to replace ousted mayor Larry Langford. Running as a conservative with a pro-business platform, he did not receive enough votes to make the runoff.

== Brüno ==
Trautwein was featured in the 2009 film Brüno, where he attempted to convert Sacha Baron Cohen's flamboyantly gay character to heterosexuality through conversion therapy. He was contacted in late January 2009 to participate in a German documentary on America's conservative values, especially compared to the "recent rise of liberalism in America perpetuated by the new, liberal administration in the White House." Trautwein later said "It's an example of the deception and perversion that is trying to enter our world through the entertainment industry. The holy and precious things of God are not to be touched and not to be mocked. I pray God has mercy on Sacha Baron Cohen." He hasn't seen the movie, stating "From what I understand it's about an hour and a half of darkness and perversion with about three minutes of light."
