= Georg Klute =

German ethnologist (born 1952)

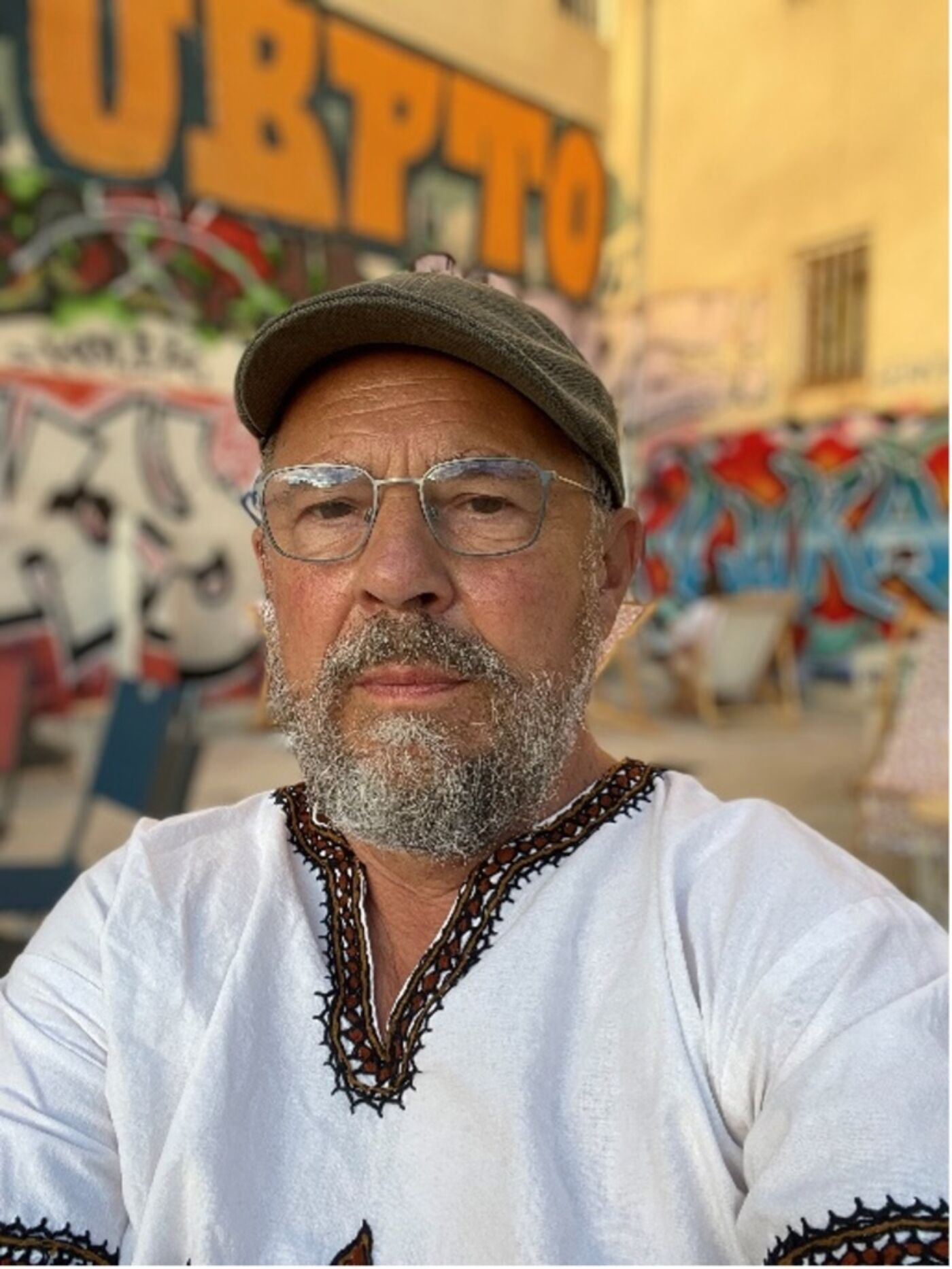
- Georg Klute, 2022
- Born: 1952 (age 73–74)
- Occupations: German ethnologist and sociologist

Academic background
- Education: University of Bayreuth

Academic work
- Discipline: Anthropology; Ethnology; Sociology
- Institutions: University of Bayreuth; University of Siegen

Georg Franz Klute (born 1952) is a German ethnologist.

== Biography ==
From 1973 to 1975, Georg Klute was a development aid volunteer in northern Niger (NGO EIRENE). From 1975 to 1990, he studied at the University of Göttingen with the subjects ethnology, Arabic studies, anthropogeography (Magister Artium Ethnologie 1980, Dr. phil. at the University of Bayreuth 1990, Habilitation in ethnosociology and development sociology at the University of Siegen 2002). From 1985 to 1987, he was a research associate in a DFG project "Qualification crises in academic careers" at the Pedagogical Seminar in Göttingen. From 1987 to 1993, he was a research associate in the research project "Work among nomads" and "Pre-industrial work" at the University of Freiburg and in the SFB 214 "Identity in Africa" in Bayreuth. From 1993 to 1994, he was the scientific advisor and production manager for the feature film "Middle of the Moment", CineNomad Film. From 1995 to 1998, he was a research associate in a DFG project at the Chair of Sociology in Siegen (de:Trutz von Trotha). He investigated issues of ethnicity, state and violence in Africa. From 1998 to 2000, he was a university assistant at the Chair of Sociology at the University of Siegen (Trutz von Trotha). From 2000 to 2002, Klute worked as a freelance consultant and lecturer at the German Foundation for International Development. In 2002, he was a research associate at the Leibniz-Zentrum Moderner Orient. From 2002 to 2003, he taught as a guest professor at the Institute for Ethnology at the FU Berlin.

Since 2003, Georg Klute is full professor for African Ethnology at the University of Bayreuth. In 2005, he was a tutor in the master's program at the École nationale d'administration (ENA). Since 2012, he has been a visiting professor at the University of Addis Ababa.

Since 2004, Klute has been a founding member and chairman of the board of TAMAT e.V., which aims to promote culture and education, development cooperation and international understanding in the Sahel. Klute is internationally recognized as one of the best experts on Tuareg culture. Last but not least, he also speaks one of their languages, Tamashaq.

With the support of Volkswagen AG, Klute was able to set up long-term school sponsorships that guarantee a functioning school system in Tuareg settlement areas. Other projects promoted the drinking water supply and food security. By investing in the training of nurses, craftsmen and teachers, TAMAT is helping to ensure that the young generation in north-west Africa has sustainable professional prospects for the future.

In 2007, he co-founded the Afro-European network ABORNE (African Borderlands Network). From 2012, he became co-editor of the magazine 'Modern Africa'. From 2012 to 2014, he was chairman of the VAD e.V. (Association of African Studies in Germany). In 2015, he was nominated for 'University Teacher of the Year' (40 nominees from around 40,000 female university teachers).

== Research focus ==
Regionally Klute concentrated on the Southern and Central Sahara, bordering West African Sahel; Algeria, Mali and Niger as well as Guinea-Bissau and Ethiopia. Thematically, Klute focused on the construction and function of the state in Africa, non-state forms of political organization, nomads and the state, Islam in Africa, work in pre-industrial societies, the anthropology of violence, war and peace, new forms of political rule (para-sovereignty, heterarchy), as well as the anthropology and sociology of development and anthropological research of monetarization.

== Awards ==
On April 9, 2018, Georg Klute received the Cross of Merit, First Class, of the Order of Merit of the Federal Republic of Germany in Munich. Therewith, the Federal President honors personalities who are committed to the community in an outstanding way. In the case of Georg Klute for his voluntary commitment as a development worker - mediator between opposing ethnic groups.

== Publications (selection) ==
=== Monographs (selection) ===
- Die schwerste Arbeit der Welt. Alltag von Tuareg-Nomaden. München 1992, ISBN 3-923804-67-9.
- Vom administrativen Häuptlingtum zur regionalen Parasouveränität. Berlin 1998, ISBN 3-86093-173-3
- with Thomas Hüsken: Emerging forms of power in contemporary Africa. A theoretical and empirical research outline. Berlin 2008, ISBN 978-3-87997-650-8
- Tuareg-Aufstand in der Wüste. Ein Beitrag zur Anthropologie der Gewalt und des Krieges. Cologne 2013, ISBN 978-3-89645-732-5.

=== Edited publications (selection) ===
- with Hauhs, Michael (eds.) 2018, Human-Environmental Relations and African Natures, special issue of Modern Africa. Politics, History and Society
- with Zeleke, Meron (eds.) 2017, Religion, Peace and Conflict in Contemporary Africa, (special issue of the Journal for the Study of the Religions of Africa and its Diaspora), Issue 3.1 (October 2017). Online publication: https://issuu.com/aasr-e-journal/docs/issue_3.1__october_2017
- with Embaló, Birgit / Borszik, Anne-Kristin / Embaló, A. Idrissa (eds.) 2008, Experiências Locais de Gestão de Conflitos – Local Experiences of Conflict Management, Bissau: INEP.
- with Embaló, Birgit (eds.) 2011, The Problem of Violence. Local Conflict Settlement in Contemporary Africa, Cologne: Koeppe
- with Hahn, Hans Peter (eds.) 2007, Cultures of Migration. African Perspectives, Münster – Hamburg – Berlin – Wien – London: Lit Verlag
- with Bellagamba, Alice (eds.) 2008, Beside the State. Emergent Powers in Contemporary Africa, Cologne: Köppe

=== Articles (selection ===
- with Ag Sidiyene, Ehya 1989, „La chronologie des années 1913/14 à 1987/88 chez les Touaregs Kal-Adagh du Mali“, Journal des Africanistes, 59 (1-2): 203-227
- with Badi, Dida 2022, „Jihadi Governance in Northern Mali: Socio-Political Orders in Contest”, Neubert, Dieter et al. (eds.), Contributions to Political Science: Local Self-Governance and Varieties of Statehood, Springer (in print)
- with Beck, Kurt 1991, „Hirtenarbeit in der Ethnologie“, Zeitschrift für Ethnologie 116, pp. 91–124
- with Bellagamba, Alice 2008, “Tracing Emergent powers in Contemporary Africa - Introduction”, Bellagamba, Alice / Georg Klute (eds.), Beside the State. Emergent Powers in Contemporary Africa, Cologne: Köppe: 7-21
- with Boesen, Elisabeth 2004, „Direkt von der Wüste in die Stadt. Moderne Migration von Nomaden aus dem Sahara-Sahelraum, Das Parlament, Beilage „Aus Politik und Zeitgeschichte“, Nr. 10 / 01.03.2004
- with Hauhs, Michael 2018, “Human-environmental relations and African natures: Editorial“, Klute, Georg / Hauhs, Michael (eds.), Human-Environmental Relations and African Natures, (special issue of Modern Africa. Politics, History and Society: 27-34
- with Hauhs, Michael / Trancón y Widemann, Baltasar 2018, “Bridging Disciplinary Gaps in Studies of Human-Environment Relations: a Modelling Framework”, Klute, Georg / Hauhs, Michael (eds.), Human-Environmental Relations and African Natures, (special issue of Modern Africa. Politics, History and Society: 35-76
- with Hüsken Thomas 2015, "Political Orders in the Making: Emerging Forms of Political Organization from Libya to Northern Mali", African Security, 8:4: 320–337.
- with Solyga, Alexander 2006, “Borut Brumen 1963-2005“, Zeitschrift für Ethnologie 131 (2006): 163-165
- with Trotha, Trutz v. 2000, „Wege zum Frieden. Vom Kleinkrieg zum parastaatlichen Frieden im Norden von Mali“, Sociologus, 50. Jg. H. 1. Berlin: 1-36
- 1992, « Le travail chez les Kal-Adagh », Journal des Africanistes, tome 62, Paris: 200–205.
- 1995, „Hostilités et alliances. Archéologie de la dissidence dans le mouvement rebelle des Touareg au Mali“, Cahiers d'Études africaines: "La démocratie déclinée", 137, XXXV-1: 55-71
- 2003, „Läßt sich Geld zähmen? Ethnologische Perspektiven auf die Monetarisierung“, Zeitschrift für Ethnologie 128 (2003): 99–117.
- 2013, “Post-Gaddafi Repercussions in Northern Mali”, Strategic Review for Southern Africa, Vol. 35, No 2: 53-67
