= University of Siegen =

Public university in Siegen, Germany

- Universität Siegen
- Motto: Zukunft menschlich gestalten
- Motto in English: Creating a humane future
- Type: Public
- Established: 1972
- Budget: €193.6 million (2020)
- Chancellor: Ulf Richter
- Rector: Stefanie Reese
- Academic staff: 1,380
- Administrative staff: 773
- Students: 18,618 (2017)
- Location: Siegen, North Rhine-Westphalia, Germany; 50°54′23″N 8°1′42″E
- Campus: Urban/Suburban
- Website: www.uni-siegen.de

The University of Siegen (German: Universität Siegen) is a public research university located in Siegen, North Rhine-Westphalia and is part of the Deutsche Forschungsgemeinschaft, a society of Germany's leading research universities. The university was founded in 1972. As of 2017, 18,618 students were enrolled at the university.

== History ==
Siegen's heritage as a centre for education and research dates back to the 16th century. In 1536, William I, Count of Nassau-Siegen charged Saxon educator and theologian Erasmus Sarcerius with the task of establishing a Latin school. During the period 1594 to 1599/1600 and 1606 to 1609, the Calvinist-Reformed Herborn Academy (Academia Nassauensis) moved from Herborn to Siegen, where it was accommodated in the buildings of the lower castle.

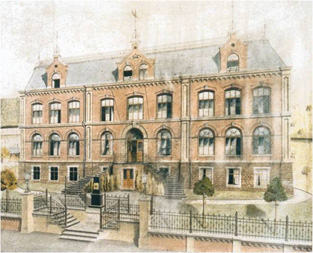
Siegen Wiesenbauschule landscaping school around 1903

=== "Wiesenbauschule" ===
In 1853, Wiesenbauschule landscaping school was established, which soon gained a reputation outside of its local area. Here, landscaping and land improvements including irrigation techniques and the drainage of meadows were taught, so as to help enhance the yields from farmland. This was of particular importance in the Siegerland region because the high demand for charcoal for the regional ironworks meant that most areas were woodland. As a result, limited areas were suitable for cattle breeding, so that research into enhancing the yields from the limited amount of meadowland had to be researched.

Following World War Two, the school's focus shifted towards civil engineering, and, in 1962, it was renamed Staatliche Ingenieurschule für Bauwesen (State School of Civil Engineering).

=== Precursor and foundation ===
The next academic facility to be set up in Siegen (formerly located at Weidenau/Hüttental) was the Pädagogische Hochschule Siegerland (Educational University Siegerland), established in 1964. In 1965, it became the Siegerland section of Pädagogische Hochschule Westfalen-Lippe (Educational University Westfalen-Lippe), which marked its transformation into a scientific university.

On 1 August 1972, the comprehensive university development act led to the setting up of a comprehensive university at Siegen/Hüttental, along with four other comprehensive universities in North Rhine-Westphalia. The Pädagogische Hochschule Siegerland and Siegen-Gummersbach University of Applied Sciences which had schools based at Siegen and Gummersbach merged to form the new Siegen comprehensive university. In 1980, Siegen comprehensive university was renamed Universität-Gesamthochschule (University-Comprehensive University). The Gummersbach location was transferred, on 1 June 1983, to Cologne University of Applied Sciences. Then, on 1 January 2003, the form of "comprehensive university" was abandoned, and the existing comprehensive universities became regular universities. Since then, the university has been called University of Siegen.

=== Current orientation ===
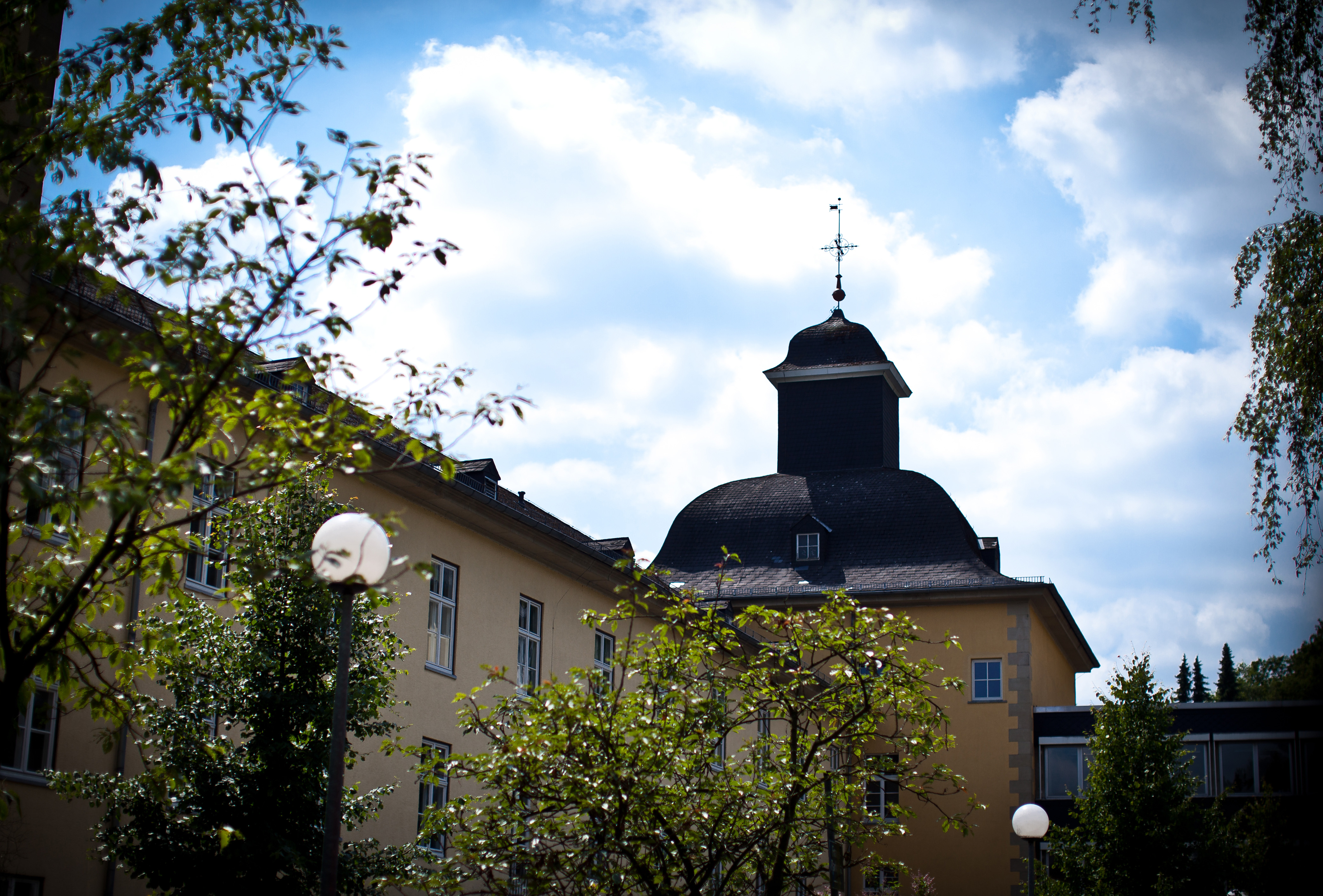
Emmy-Noether-Campus

In 1996, the University/Comprehensive University of Siegen was the first German university to take part in the "Institutional Quality Audit Programme" of the Conference of European Rectors (CRE) and went on to implement the auditors' recommendations step-by-step. University of Siegen sees itself as a modern university with a focus on basic research, practical training and contributing towards structural change in the district of Siegen-Wittgenstein and adjacent regions.

In line with the political objectives which led to the establishment of comprehensive universities, the University of Siegen is a hallmark for democracy, equal opportunities, transparent professional and scientific education as well as an international outlook. The reform approach inherent to the comprehensive university was put into practice through integral programmes, such as the innovative integrated diploma programmes "Media planning, development and consultancy" and "German and European commercial law".

Within the framework of the Bologna process, the University of Siegen implemented the Bachelor/Masters system early on, with the aim of completing the set-up of this model in all faculties during winter semester 2006–2007. The last remaining diploma programmes were actually transformed into Bachelor/Masters programmes during winter semester 2008–2009. This move enables students' achievements to be comparable and drives the international orientation of programmes. In addition, modern language training with a focus on partnerships abroad is being introduced and enhanced.

The University of Siegen is increasingly committed to working with alumni and organizes alumni meetings at regular intervals.

== Organization ==
=== Faculties ===
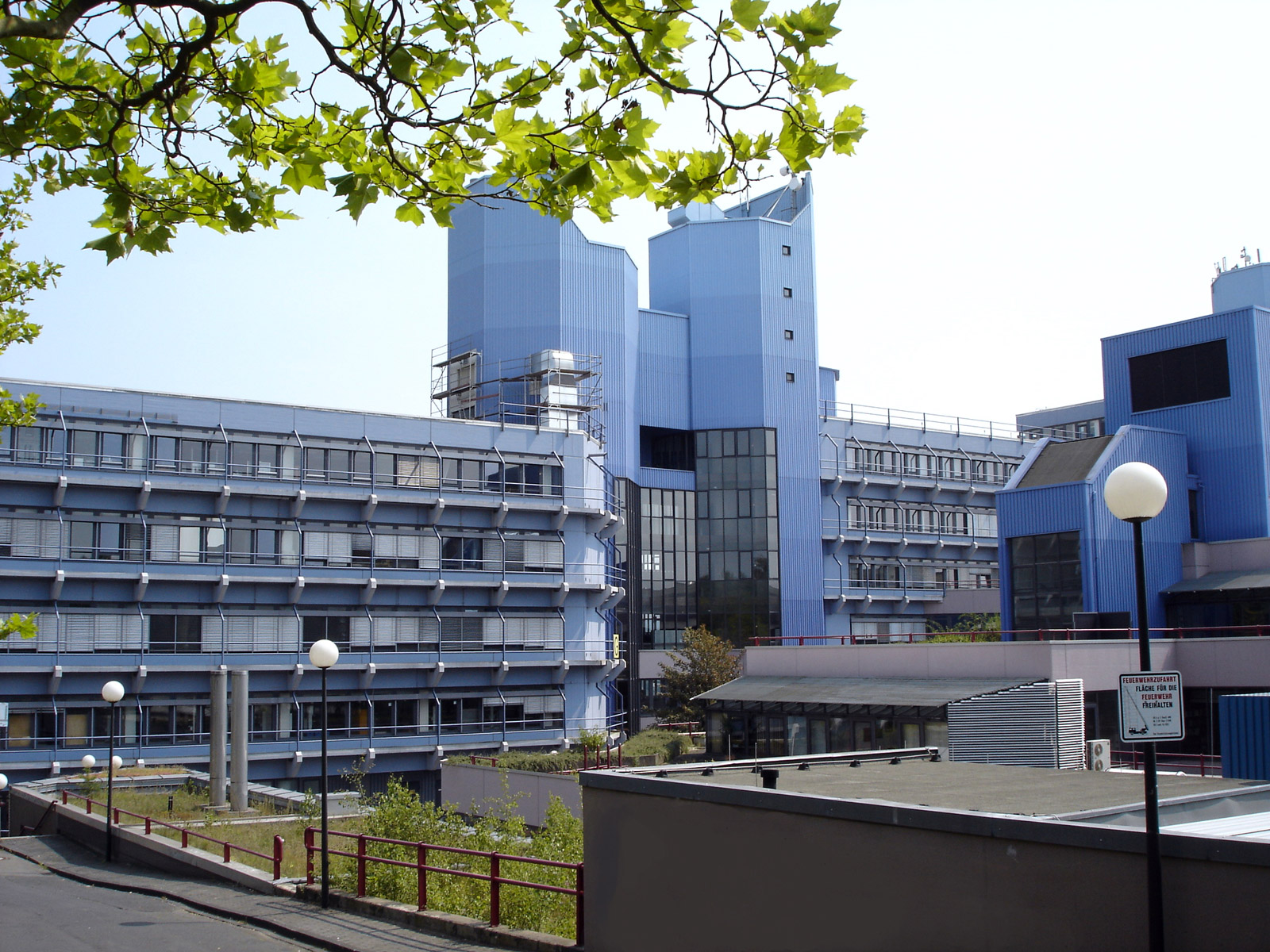
Campus "Adolf-Reichwein-Strasse"

University of Siegen offers in total 126 degree programmes across four faculties:

Faculty I: Faculty of Arts and Humanities
Department of Germanic Studies
Department of History
Department of Media Studies
Department of Philosophy
Department of Romance Studies
Department of English
Department of Protestant Theology
Department of Catholic Theology
Department of Social Sciences
Faculty II: Education · Architecture · Arts
Department of Education and Psychology
Department of Architecture
Department of Art and Music
Faculty III: School of Economic Disciplines
Faculty IV: Science and Technology
Department of Civil Engineering
Department of Chemistry and Biology
Department of Electrical Engineering and Computer Science
Department of Mechanical Engineering
Department of Mathematics
Department of Physics
Department of Nano Science & Nano Technology

=== Scientific Centres and Institutions ===
==== Transdisciplinary media research ====
- Institute for media research
- Graduate School "Locating Media"

==== Liberal arts, social science and educational studies ====
- University of Siegen Competence Centre
- Research institute for liberal arts and social sciences
- Institute for European Regional Research
- Siegen Institute for professional language and communication
- Siegen centre for socialization, CV and biography research
- Centre for annotational interpretation of Kant
- Centre for teacher training
- Centre for planning and evaluation of social services
- Siegen centre for gender studies

==== Business economics with a focus on "decentral organization" ====
- South Westphalia academy for medium-sized business
- Siegen medium-sized business institute
- Siegen institute for company taxation, auditing, reporting and commercial law
- Centre for economic training in Siegen
- Centre of excellence

==== Natural sciences and engineering ====
- Centre for innovative materials
- Centre for developing country research and knowledge transfer
- DFG Research Unit "Quark Flavour Physics and Effective Field Theories"
- DFG post graduate programme "Imaging New Modalities"
- North Rhine-Westphalia centre for sensor systems
- Research centre for micro/nano chemistry and technology
- Research centre for multidisciplinary analyses and applied system optimization
- Research Institute for Water and Environment
- Siegen Center for Particle Physics (CPPS)

== Students ==
=== General ===
The university has a combined undergraduate and graduate student population of around 17,500. Approximately 13.5% of these students are foreigners. The University of Siegen offers a large variety of undergraduate, graduate, and postdoctoral degree programs at its four faculties in 144 fields of study. As common among German universities, the academic year consists of summer and winter terms (semesters). The winter term runs from 1 October to 31 March, while the summer term runs from 1 April to 30 September. However, lectures and classes usually do not run for the full duration of these periods and allow for breaks in spring and fall. German universities enjoy government subsidies, and as a result of legislative reform, beginning in Fall 2011 the University of Siegen will no longer charge tuition fees.

=== Student life ===
There are numerous student clubs and organizations, among them a student-run radio station, Radius 92.1, and a student television program, Campus TV. Siegen is situated in one of the most densely forested areas in Germany and offers fine opportunities for leisure and outdoor activities. The university provides student housing in its various dormitories, run by the Studentenwerk. Additionally, there are further dormitories in Siegen which are operated by other institutions as well as partnerships with elderly people. Many students find private living arrangements, such as Wohngemeinschaften (shared apartments).

=== International Students ===
The International Office is the main contact for questions concerning the international course of studies, the international academy cooperation and the international academic exchange. Additionally the International Office guides and mentors international applicants for a place at university with all kinds of questions around the course of studies and life in Siegen. A number of activities for international students facilitates their integration and help students to find new friends. Each semester the International Office offers a Welcome week where international students are guided through their first steps in Siegen (walk through the city, opening a bank account, registration for medical insurance etc.). During the semester a program including trips to nearby cities, intercultural trainings or high rope courses is offered.

== Campus ==
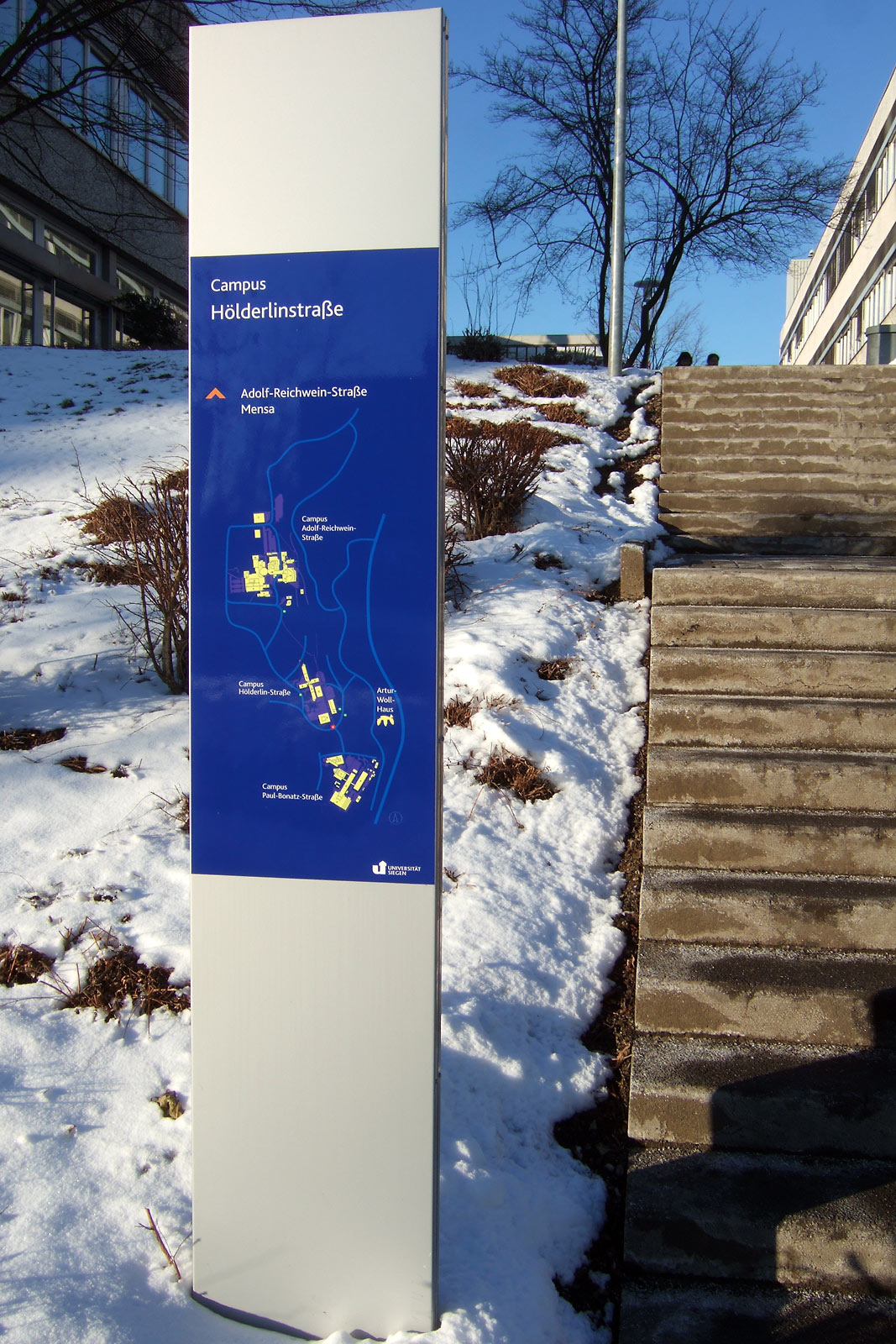
Campus sign post

The University of Siegen is a campus university with some 92,000 m^{2} of floor space. Buildings are distributed across three core areas in Siegen (Haardter Berg hill, Emmy-Noether-Campus and administration based at Herrengarten).

=== Location ===
Most university buildings are on the north-eastern side of Siegen, in the Weidenau district. Facilities at Haardter Berg include the Adolf-Reichwein-Straße campus, which has the largest lecture halls, the central canteen, the central library as well as a part of the centre for information and media technology. Some 500 m south-east is the Hölderlinstraße campus, which accommodates the centre for information and media technology, the central course guidance service and a departmental library. Another 400 m south, at Paul-Bonatz-Straße, is the engineering Campus, the modern-day descendant of the former engineering school. Artur-Woll-Haus on the eastern slope of Haardter Berg hill, which opened on 25 March 2003, accommodates the guest house and the externally funded research facilities.

Some 5 kilometres (3.1 mi) south-west of Haardter Berg, at Fischbacherberg hill is the Emmy-Noether-Campus, which, since 1999, has been home to the mathematics and physics faculties. 1 kilometre (0.62 mi) west of Haardter Berg, on the borders of the Weidenau and Geisweid districts, is the former brewery, where the art faculty is located. Here, art students create practical work, including painting and photography, and exhibitions are held on a regular basis. The university administration and student services are located in the former Siegen inland revenue offices at Herrengarten, right in the city centre, whilst the international office can be found in Siegen's former telegraph office. The city, the university and the government are working together to put Siegen's lower castle completely at the university's disposal to accommodate facilities and faculties.

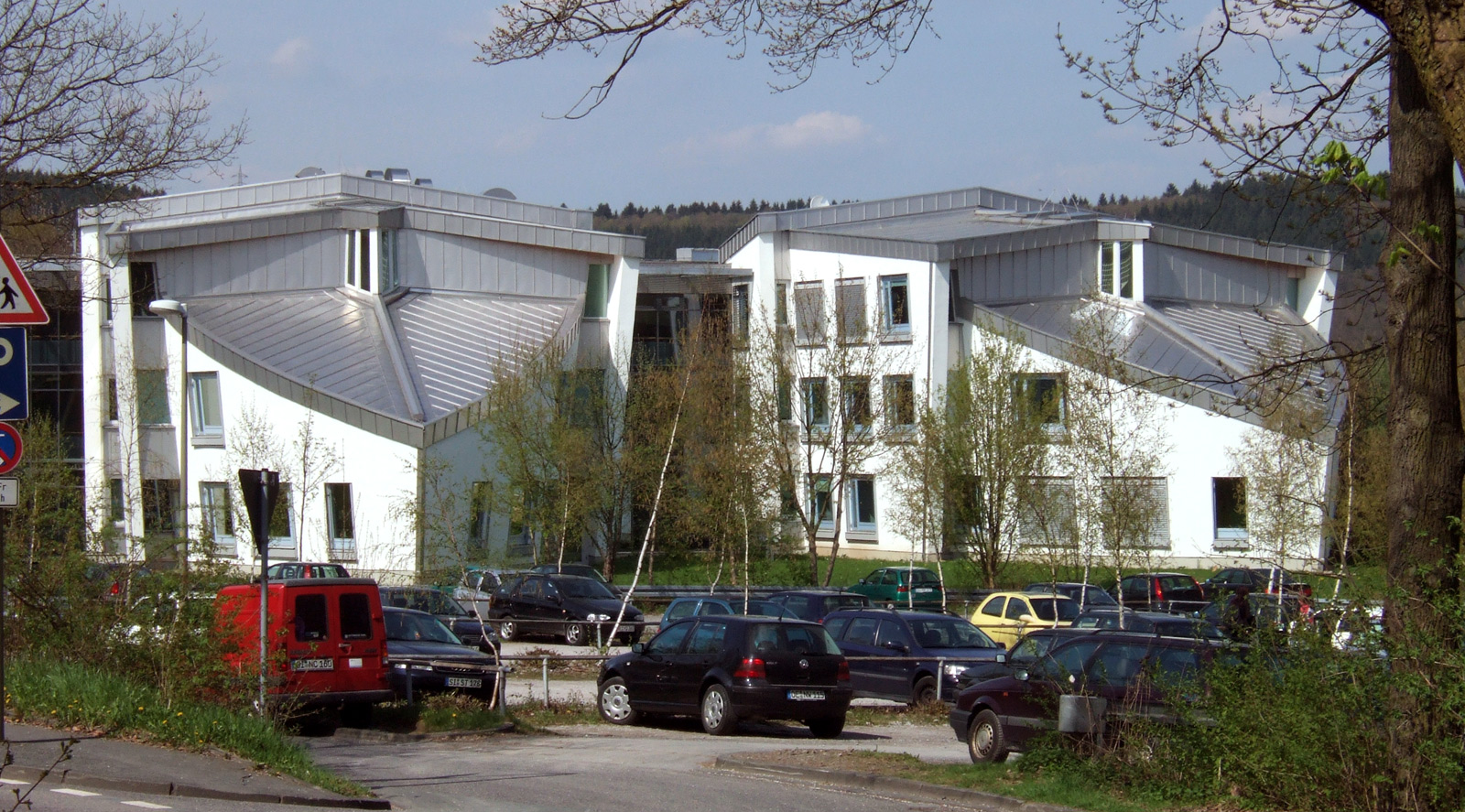
Artur-Woll-Haus

=== Architecture ===
Artur-Woll-Haus is an exceptional building, which was designed by Dutch architects rau architecten. It consists of an arc-shaped central unit with three wings that resemble a tug. The cost of construction was around €8.6 million.

The University of Siegen was planned together with other universities in North Rhine-Westphalia, so that a similar style and even some of the same building modules can be found at universities of Duisburg-Essen, Paderborn und Wuppertal.

== Rankings ==
University rankings

Overall – Global & National
THE World 2026	501-600	44-46

In the 2024 edition of the Times Higher Education World University Rankings, the university was ranked 601–800 globally .

In 2025, it was placed in the 501–600 bracket worldwide and 42-47 nationally.

In the 2026 rankings, the university was positioned at 501–600 globally and 44–46 within the country.

== Notable Alumni and Professors ==
- Marcel Beyer (born 1965), writer
- Uwe Boll (born 1965), director, producer and screenwriter
- Paul Breuer (born 1950), parliamentary defense policy spokesman for the Christian Democratic Union
- Peter Hussing (born 1948), heavyweight boxing champion
- Thomas Kellner (born 1966), Fine Art Photographer, Guest Professor and Curator
- Georg Klute (born 1952), ethnologist, sociologist, Prof.em.Dr., University of Bayreuth
- Andreas Pinkwart (born 1960), deputy prime minister of North Rhine-Westphalia 2005–2009 (Free Democratic Party)
- Hans Ulrich Gumbrecht (born 1948), German-American professor of literary studies
- Frank Sauer (born 1959), Kabarett artist, actor and writer
- Frank Schirrmacher (born 1959), co-publisher of the national German newspaper Frankfurter Allgemeine Zeitung
- Klaus-Peter Thaler (born 1949), cyclo-cross champion
- Axel Weber (born 1957), Chairman of UBS and former president of Deutsche Bundesbank
