= Ulrich Trautwein =

German psychologist and education researcher

- Born: 31 May 1972 (age 53)
- Citizenship: Germany
- Occupations: psychologist and education researcher
- Employer: University of Tübingen

Ulrich Trautwein (born 31 May 1972) is a German psychologist and education researcher. He has been a Full Professor of Education Science at the University of Tübingen, Germany, since October 2008. In addition, he has been director of LEAD Graduate School & Research Network at Tübingen University since 2012. Since 2014, he has also headed the Hector Research Institute of Education Sciences and Psychology in Tübingen.

== Biography ==
Trautwein grew up in Reutlingen in the state of Baden-Württemberg. After completing his high school education he studied Psychology at the University of Göttingen, Germany, and the University of California, Santa Cruz. After obtaining his diploma in Göttingen 1999, he worked until 2008 in various positions as a researcher at the Max Planck Institute for Human Development, Berlin. In 2002 he completed his doctorate, 2005 his habilitation in Psychology at the Free University of Berlin.

== Career ==
In 2007 he became a research group leader at the Max Planck Institute for Human Development. Shortly after being appointed an Honorary Professor at the Free University of Berlin in 2008, he joined the University of Tübingen as a Full Professor of Education Science. Trautwein is director of LEAD Graduate School & Research Network at Tübingen University, founded in 2012. LEAD features a research and training program for doctoral students and postdocs on learning, education achievement, and life course development. The School hosts more than 130 researchers and is funded by the German Universities Excellence Initiative of the German Federal Ministry of Education and Research. In 2014, Trautwein became the founding director of the Hector Research Institute of Education Sciences and Psychology. Since 2011 Trautwein has served as an expert advisor to the German federal government and the Kultusministerkonferenz in terms of education issues.

== Research ==
Trautwein has published a large number of articles on a number of topics, including the development of conscientiousness, expectancy-value beliefs, and academic effort, the effectiveness of homework assignments and completion, and the results of several randomized controlled field trials in school settings. According to an analysis published by Jones et al. (2010) in Contemporary Education Psychology, Trautwein was the third most productive researcher worldwide in the field of education psychology during 2003–2008. In 2016, Greenbaum et al. named him among the most productive researchers in education psychology as number 4 worldwide. Trautwein is principal investigator of two multicohort, longitudinal school achievement studies (TOSCA, TRAIN).

== Awards ==
- CORECHED Prize in Educational Research awarded by the Swiss Council for Educational Research, 2009
- Young Investigator Award: Section for Educational Psychology of the German Psychological Society, 2004
- Otto Hahn Medal for outstanding PhD dissertation, Max Planck Society, 2003

== Publications ==
- Bertram, C., Wagner, W., & Trautwein, U. (2017). Learning historical thinking with oral history interviews. A cluster randomized controlled intervention study of oral history interviews in history lessons. American Educational Research Journal, 54, 444–484. doi: 10.3102/0002831217694833
- Gaspard, H., Dicke, A.-L., Flunger, B., Brisson, B., Häfner, I., Nagengast, B., & Trautwein, U. (2015). Fostering adolescents’ value beliefs for mathematics with a relevance intervention in the classroom. Developmental Psychology, 51, 1226–1240. doi: 10.1037/dev0000028
- Trautwein, U., Lüdtke, O., Nagy, N., Lenski, A., Niggli, A., & Schnyder, I. (2015). Using individual interest and conscientiousness to predict academic effort: additive, synergistic, or compensatory effects? Journal of Personality and Social Psychology, 109, 142–162. doi:10.1037/pspp0000034
- Chmielewski, A. K., Dumont, H., & Trautwein, U. (2013). Tracking effects depend on tracking type: An international comparison of mathematics self-concept. American Educational Research Journal, 50, 925–957. doi:10.3102/0002831213489843
- Trautwein, U., Marsh, H.W., Nagengast, B., Lüdtke, O., Nagy, G., & Jonkmann, K. (2012). Probing for the multiplicative term in modern expectancy-value theory: A latent interaction modeling study. Journal of Educational Psychology, 104, 763–777. doi:10.1037/a0027470
- Dettmers, S., Trautwein, U., Lüdtke, O., Kunter, M., & Baumert, J. (2010). Homework works if homework quality is high: using multilevel modeling to predict the development of achievement in mathematics. Journal of Educational Psychology, 102, 467–482. doi:10.1037/a0018453
- Trautwein, U., Lüdtke, O., Marsh, H. W., & Nagy, G. (2009). Within-school social comparison: How students’ perceived standing of their class predicts academic self-concept. Journal of Educational Psychology, 101, 853–866. doi:10.1037/a0016306
- Trautwein, U., Lüdtke, O., Roberts, B. W., Schnyder, I., & Niggli, A. (2009). Different forces, same consequence: Conscientiousness and competence beliefs are independent predictors of academic effort and achievement. Journal of Personality and Social Psychology, 97, 1115–1128. doi:10.1037/a0017048
- Trautwein, U., Niggli, A., Schnyder, I., & Lüdtke, O. (2009). Between-teacher differences in homework assignments and the development of students’ homework effort, homework emotions, and achievement. Journal of Educational Psychology, 101, 176–189. doi:10.1037/0022–0663.101.1.176
- Trautwein, U., Lüdtke, O., Köller, O., & Baumert, J. (2006). Self-esteem, academic self-concept, and achievement: How the learning environment moderates the dynamics of self-concept. Journal of Personality and Social Psychology, 90, 334–349. doi:10.1037/0022–3514.90.2.334
- Trautwein, U., Lüdtke, O., Marsh, H. W., Köller, O., & Baumert, J. (2006). Tracking, grading, and student motivation: Using group composition and status to predict self-concept and interest in ninth grade mathematics. Journal of Educational Psychology, 98, 788–806. doi:10.1037/0022–0663.98.4.788
- Trautwein, U., Lüdtke, O., Schnyder, I., & Niggli, A. (2006). Predicting homework effort: Support for a domain-specific, multilevel homework model. Journal of Educational Psychology, 98, 438–456. doi:10.1037/0022–0663.98.2.438
