= Otto IV of Brandenburg-Stendal =

Margrave of Brandenburg

Otto IV, Margrave of Brandenburg-Stendal
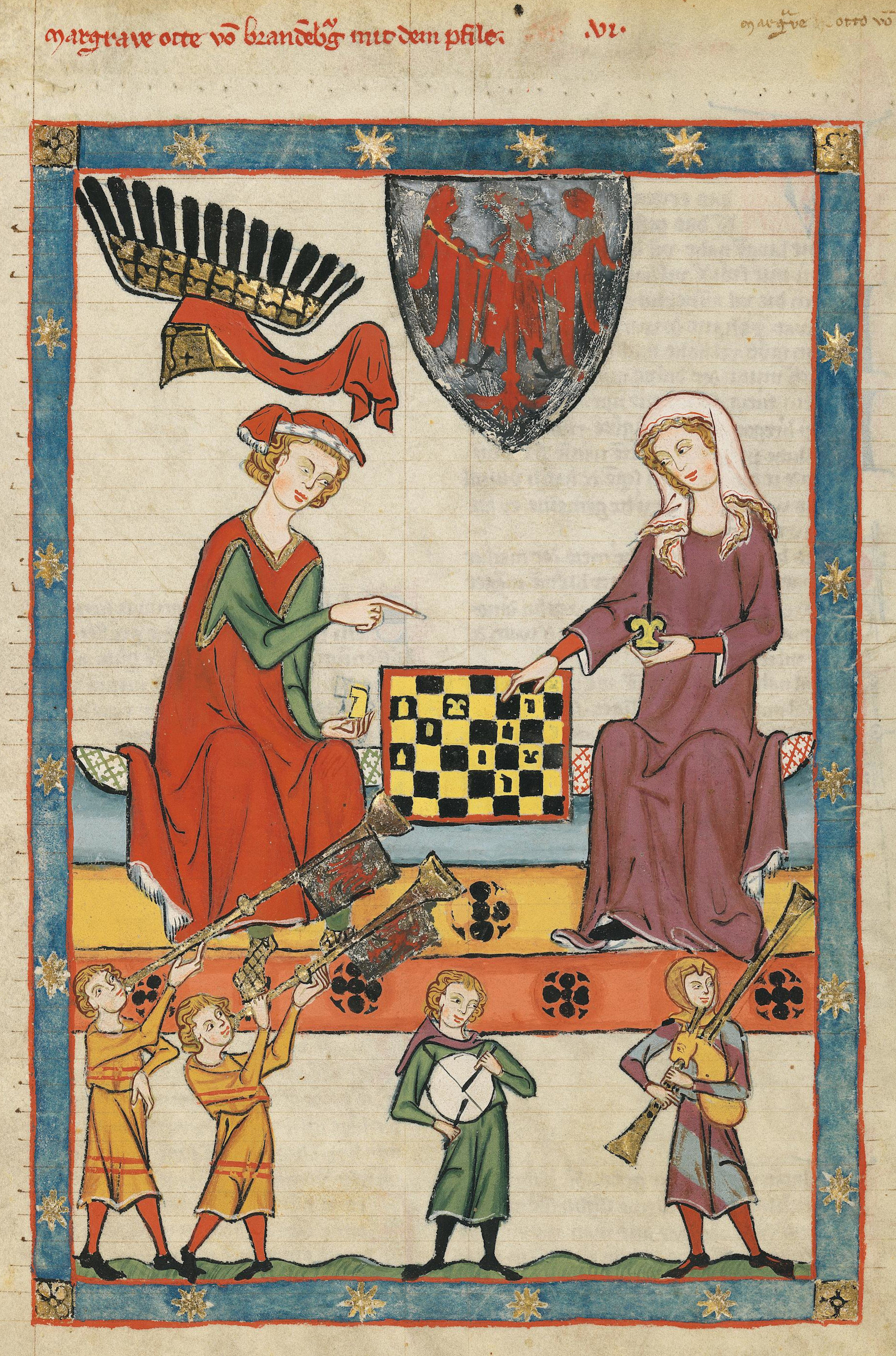
- Margrave Otto IV of Brandenburg, depicted in the Codex Manesse (c. 1300)
- Born: c. 1238
- Died: 27 November 1308 or 1309
- Noble family: House of Ascania
- Spouses: Heilwig of Holstein-Kiel; Jutta of Henneberg
- Father: John I, Margrave of Brandenburg
- Mother: Sophie of Denmark

Otto IV, Margrave of Brandenburg-Stendal, nicknamed Otto with the arrow (c. 1238 – 27 November 1308 or 1309) was the Margrave of Brandenburg from the House of Ascania from 1266 until his death.

== Life ==
Otto was the son of John I and his first wife, Sophie of Denmark. His maternal grandparents were king Valdemar II of Denmark and his second wife, Berengaria of Portugal; his paternal grandparents were Albert II and Matilda of Lusatia.

=== Reign ===
After his father died in 1266, Otto IV ruled Brandenburg-Stendal jointly with his older brother John II and his younger brother Conrad I. Otto IV emerged as the most prominent of the three.

In 1269, Otto IV and his co-ruling brothers Conrad and John II accepted Duke Mestwin II of Pomerelia as their vassal (Treaty of Arnswalde). Later, the Duke of Pomerelia would resist Brandenburg sovereignty, leading to numerous feuds, the first of which erupted in 1278, when Mestwin militarily supported Bolesław the Pious against Brandenburg.

In 1277, Otto tried to have his younger brother Eric elected as Archbishop of Magdeburg. However, the Lords of Querfurt, who were Burgraves of Magdeburg, also fielded a candidate. As a compromise, Günther I of Schwalenberg was appointed. This led to a protracted dispute between Otto and the chapter of Magdeburg Cathedral. During the Battle of Fohse, Magdeburg managed to capture Otto and lock him in a cage. Otto's councillor Johann von Buch paid a ransom of 4000 pounds silver to have him released. The dispute continued during the reign of Günther's successor Bernard III of Wölpe.

During a fight in Staßfurt in 1280, Otto was hit by an arrow. Allegedly, he lived for a year with an arrow sticking out of his head, hence his nickname. It is not quite clear how long he walked around like that; one tradition says "for some time", another says "for many years". There are no written sources to resolve this. Eric was finally appointed Bishop of Magdeburg in 1283, after Pope Martin IV had given his blessing.

In 1278 he joined King Ottokar II of Bohemia on a campaign in Hungary, where they clashed with Rudolph I of Germany. His cousin and co-ruler Otto V was Ottokar's nephew. Ottokar II fell during the Battle on the Marchfeld in 1278. Otto V became guardian for Ottokar's seven-year-old son Wenceslaus II. However, he held Wenclaus hostage in Spandau while his armies sacked Bohemia. Otto IV participated in his cousin's rule over Bohemia. Wencelaus was released in 1283, after Bohemia had paid a ransom and ceded some territory. Wencelaus later maintained cordial relations with Otto IV.

The Peace of Rostock of a 1283 created an alliance led by the City of Lübeck, uniting the cities of Wismar, Rostock, Stralsund, Greifswald, Szczecin, Demmin, Anklam, Duke Bogislaw IV of Pomerania, Prince Wizlaw II of Rügen, and Duke John I of Saxony against Brandenburg. In the Treaty of Vierraden of 1284, Otto IV and his co-rulers returned the Pomerelian territories they had conquered earlier.

In 1290, an internal dispute arose in Brandenburg between Otto IV of Brandenburg-Stendal and his cousin and co-ruler Otto V "the Long" of Brandenburg-Salzwedel, who made an alliance with the Piast dukes of Silesia. In 1294, the dispute escalated to an armed conflict. In 1295, King Adolph mediated and the conflict was resolved. Later that year, Otto IV made an alliance with Duke Otto II of Brunswick-Lüneburg.

In 1292, after the death of King Rudolf, Otto had as elector supported the election of Adolf of Nassau as the new King, against the candidacy of Rudolf's son Albert of Austria. In this, Otto was in league with the Bohemian king (his former ward and prisoner Venceslas) who actually was instigator of anti-Habsburg stance and the candidacy of Adolf.

In 1292, Otto IV purchased the Margraviate of Landsberg and in 1292 the County Palatine of Saxony, a territory in the Saale-Unstrut area. In 1303, he purchased Lusatia from Landgrave Dietrich IV.

In 1296, Brandenburg began a war against King Przemysł II of Poland, who had occupied Pomerania, because Brandenburg also claimed sovereignty over Pomerania and Brandenburg wanted to have a port on the Baltic sea. This war was unsuccessful.

In 1298, Otto IV participated in the overthrow of King Adolph, but not in the military campaign against him.

Otto IV was also involved in feuds against Lord Nicholas I of Rostock, Prince Wizlaw II of Rügen, Dukes Henry I of Brunswick-Grubenhagen and Albert II of Brunswick-Wolfenbüttel and Göttingen and the Bishops of Brandenburg and Havelberg. The conflict with the bishops culminated in an interdict being pronounced over him.

=== Chivalry ===
Otto IV was said to have lived his life after chivalric ideals. He was described as "one of the most brilliant and gallant princes of his time". His biography also suggests a rather combative character. He was also active as a minstrel; seven of his songs, written in an Upper German dialect, have been preserved. Compared to other compositions from his era, his pieces can be described as excellent.

== Marriage ==
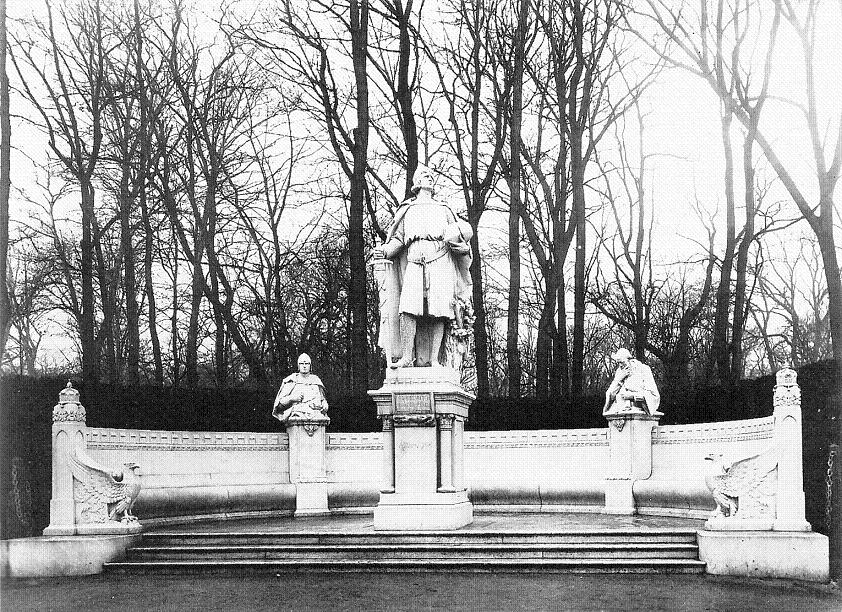
Monument for Otto IV on the Siegesallee

Otto IV married twice, but died childless. In 1262, he married Heilwig, the daughter of Count John I of Holstein-Kiel and Elisabeth of Saxony. She died in 1305. He remarried in 1308, to Jutta, who was a daughter of Count Berthold VIII of Henneberg and the widow of Dietrich IV of Lusatia. Jutta survived her second husband and died in 1315.

== Monument ==
Karl Begas designed statue group 7 of the Siegesallee in Berlin, centered on a statue of Otto IV, flanked by busts of Johann von Kröche (nicknamed Droiseke) and Johann von Buch. This statue group was unveiled on 22 March 1899.

== Family Tree ==
Otto I	Judith of Poland	Conrad II	Elisabet of Poland
Albert II	Matilda of Lusatia
John I
John II	Otto IV	Eric of Brandenburg

Valdemar I	Sophia of Novgorod	Sancho I	Dulce of Barcelona
Valdemar II	Berengaria of Portugal
Sophia of Denmark
Conrad I	Helene	Herman

== Footnotes ==
Otto IV of Brandenburg-Stendal House of Ascania Born: c. 1238 Died: 27 November 1308 or 1309
Preceded by Otto III	Margrave of Brandenburg-Stendal; 1266–1308	Succeeded by Waldemar
