= Wilbrand von Käfernburg =

German bishop (c. 1180–1253)

Wilbrand von Käfernburg (Note: Also known as Wilbrand von Kevernburg. His given name is also found as Wulbrand or Hildebrand.) (c. 1180 – 5 April 1253) was the Archbishop of Magdeburg between 1235 and 1253.

== Life ==
Wilbrand was the son of Prince Günter II of Schwarzburg-Käfernburg, by his father's second marriage which was to the Princess Adelheid of Loccum-Hallermund.

In August 1209 Wilbrad was appointed Provost at the church of St Nicholas, Magdeburg, where he was appointed Domherr. In 1212 he moved to Bibra where he was appointed provost Provost, and between 1212 and 1226 he was active as Papal Subdeacon and Chamberlain. Through the intervention of his half brother, Archbishop Albert of Käfernburg, he was appointed cathedral provost in Magdeburg in 1225. When Albert died in October 1232 the Cathedral Chapter elected Burkhard I of Woldenberg as the new archbishop, event though Wilbrand had been expected to take over the position. Less than four years later, on 31 May 1235, Burchard also died, and Wilbrand von Kevernburg was elected to the position of archbishop, although his appointment was not confirmed till November or December 1235.

Wilbrand cultivated good relations with the emperor. This meant that relations with the pope, especially after 1239 which was the year in which Pope Gregory excommunicated Emperor Frederick, were dreadful. Wilbrand's loyalty to the emperor provoked several threats of excommunication from a later pope, Innocent IV, who took over in 1241. The wider context in the Magdeburg area was a decline in the authority of the emperor whose focus during these years was on his territories in Sicily. This opened the way for a corresponding growth in the independence and expansionist appetites of local German rulers.

As archbishop, Wilbrand found himself in conflict with the territorial ambitions of the Ascanian lords John and his brother Otto, who were jointly the Margraves of Brandenburg, because he transferred the towns of Köpenick and Mittenwalde from Henry III, Margrave of Meissen. The later outcome of the mid-century wars was the incorporation of these territories into Brandenburg, but Wilbrand was able to win Lebus for the Archbishopric of Magdeburg.

In 1253 he acquired land for St Peter's Church in Olvenstedt (today a suburb on the western fringe of Magdeburg).
