= Walthard =

Walthard (or Waltaro) (died 12 August 1012) was the Archbishop of Magdeburg very briefly from June to August in 1012.

Walthard was the initial archiepiscopal candidate of the cathedral chapter on the death of Archbishop Giseler in 1004, but King Henry II elected to appoint his chaplain Tagino instead. When Tagino died on 9 June 1012, the cathedral elected Walthard, but he died within a few months and they elected one named Otto, who was passed over again by the king in favour of Gero. Otto was accepted into the royal chaplaincy as a consolation.

== Sources ==
- Reuter, Timothy. Germany in the Early Middle Ages 800–1056. New York: Longman, 1991.
- Thompson, James Westfall. Feudal Germany, Volume II. New York: Frederick Ungar Publishing Co., 1928.

== Notes ==
Walthard (also Waltard, Walther) Born: c. 960 Died: 12 August 1012 on Giebichenstein Castle
Catholic Church titles
Preceded by Tagino	Archbishop of Magdeburg; 1012	Succeeded by Gero
