= Eastern March =

Eastern March (Latin: Marcha Orientalis) may refer to:

- any frontier region (march) that is positioned towards the East
- Eastern March (Austria), a medieval march on the Danube river
- Eastern March (Saxony), a medieval march to the east of the Elbe river
- Eastern March (Scotland), a medieval march on Scottish border with England

== See also ==
- Ostmark (disambiguation)
- German Eastern Marches Society
