= John II of Brandenburg-Stendal =

Margrave of Brandenburg

John II, Margrave of Brandenburg-Stendal
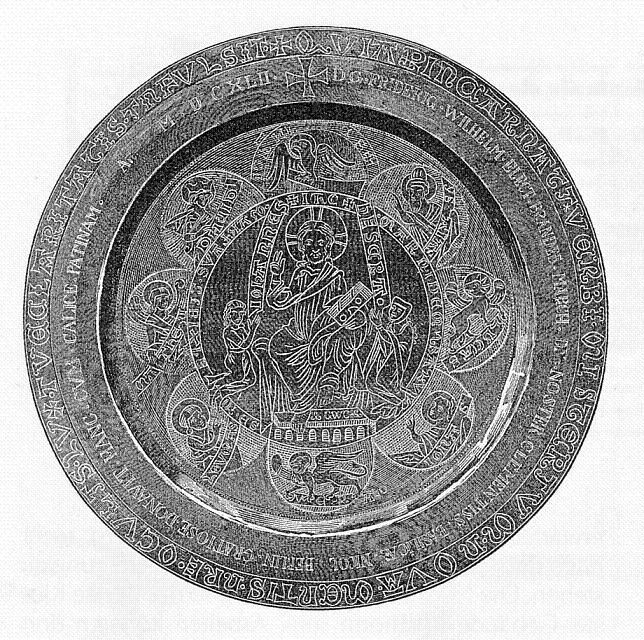
- Paten depicting John II and his wife, Hedwig of Werle, from the Chorin Abbey, 1280/1290
- Born: 1237
- Died: 10 September 1281
- Spouse: Hedwig of Werle
- House: House of Ascania
- Father: John I, Margrave of Brandenburg
- Mother: Sophie of Denmark

John II, Margrave of Brandenburg-Stendal (1237 – 10 September 1281) was co-ruler of Brandenburg with his brother Otto "with the arrow" from 1266 until his death. He also used the title Lord of Krossen, after a town in the Neumark.

== Life ==
=== Co-ruler ===
John II belonged to the Brandenburg line of the House of Ascania and was the eldest son of Margrave John I and his first wife, Sophie of Denmark (1217–1247), the daughter of King Valdemar II of Denmark and his second wife, Berengaria of Portugal. Since he was only co-ruler and appeared in the limelight less often than his brother, less is known about him than the other Ascanian Margraves of Brandenburg. On one occasion in 1269, he was consignatory of the Treaty of Arnswalde with Duke Mestwin II of Pomerelia. Nevertheless, he is one of only two of the co-rulers of this time (the other being Otto IV) to be given a statue on the Siegesallee in Berlin by Kaiser Wilhelm II.

=== Chorin Abbey ===
Most of what is known about John II relates to Chorin Abbey. This was a Cistercian abbey that his father had founded in 1258 under the name Mariensee, where he intended the Margraves of Brandenburg-Stendel would be buried, considering that Lehnin Abbey, where the earlier margraves had been buried, was located in the part of the Margraviate held by the Brandenburg-Salzwedel line.

==== Ascanian castles on the Schorfheide hunting grounds ====
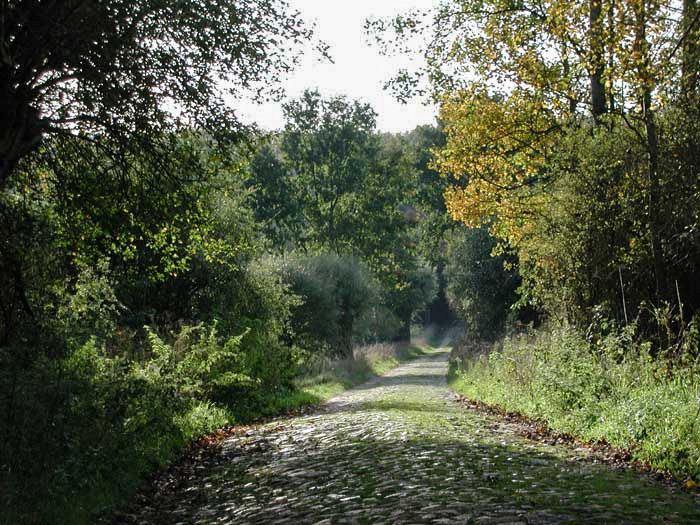
400-year-old road in the Schorfheide hunting grounds

In 1273 the three brothers, Otto IV "with the arrow", John II and Conrad I (the father of Waldemar, the last great Margrave of Brandenburg from the House of Ascania) issued a joint declaration confirming the move of the Mariensee monastery to Chorin. Their three seals show the same picture of a standing armed Margrave with an eagle on his shield and the margraviate flag flying from his lance. They only differ in the inscription, which associates each seal with one of the brothers.

The deed was issued on the castle at Werbellin, a village in the Schorfheide area to the west of the monastery. In the second half of the 13th century, the Schorfheide was the Ascanians' favourite hunting ground. Besides Werbellin, they had two other castles in this vast forest area. Otto IV's favourite castle was Grimnitz Castle on the western shore of Lake Grimnitzsee. John II preferred the fortified house at Breden on the south-eastern shore of Lake Werbellin and the castle in Werbellin at the southern end of the lake.

All three castles had been established by John I and were probably destroyed during the 14th century. Ruins of Grminitz castle still exist. It was first mentioned in a deed sealed by John II, Otto IV, Conrad I and Henry I ""Lackland" in 1297. On the hill site of Werbellin castle, a (closed) observation tower now stands. This tower was inaugurated by Prince Charles of Prussia as a reminder of the Ascanians in 1879. Wolfganf Erdemann has suggested that this paten was donated after John II's death by his brothers Otto IV and Conrad I: donated to Chorin to remember the Ascanians. The other half of the Eucharist set is a beautiful calyx (the Ascanian chalice), which was probably donated in 1266 or 1267 and depicts John I and Otto III and their wives.

John II was buried as Chorin Abbey 1281 and his wife Hedwig in 1287. The abbey's construction had not been completed at that time.

=== Marriage and issue ===
Between 1258 and 1262, he married Hedwig of Werle (1243–1287), the daughter of Nicholas I of Werle and Jutta of Anhalt. They had two sons:

- Conrad II (1261–1308)
- John (1263–1292), Bishop of Havelberg

== Statue on the Siegesallee ==
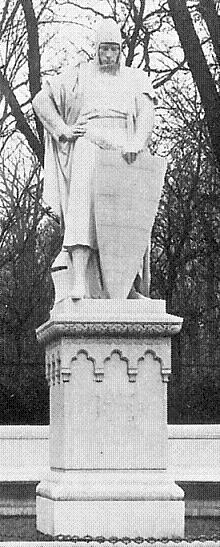
The statue of John II on the Siegesallee

The inclusion of a statue of John II's nephew Henry II, who played an insignificant rôle in the history of Brandenburg, in the statue collection lining the Siegesallee, was controversial and in the end his statue was only accepted for reasons of symmetry: the design called for sixteen statue groups on both sides of the avenue. No such controversy appears to have existed around the inclusion of the equally insignificant co-ruler John II. As typical contemporaries and distinctive supporting characters, whose busts would complete John II's statue group, the historical commission led by Reinhold Koser selected Count Günther I of Lindow and Ruppin (d. 1284) and Konrad Belitz (d. 1308), a long-distance trader and councillor from Berlin.

Sculpture group 6 was sculpted by Reinhold Felderhoff, who was given a free hand in the design of his statues. No contemporary picture of John II was available. The Chronica Marchionum Brandenburgensium describes John II as small in stature, capable and strong. However, the overall design of the Siegesallee prescribed a uniform height of all statues. The design Felderhoff settled on, was rather unlike the historicizing art of the other statue groups on the Siegesallee. Instead, he opted for an almost modern large typifying shape. He refrained from individualizing his statue and instead created a quiet and serious warrior archetype. The warrior is looking to the ground and leans on a large shield bearing the arms of the House of Ballenstedt — Esico of Ballenstedt is considered the progenitor of the House of Ascania.

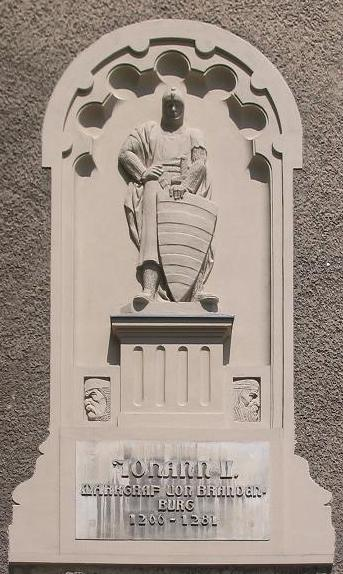
Relief in Mariendorf by an unknown artist, after the statue on the Siegesallee, 1909

Sculpture group 6 was ceremonially unveiled on 14 November 1900. Between 1978 and 2009, John II's statue was housed in the Lapidarium in Kreuzberg. Since 2009, it has been on display in the Spandau Citadel. A relief after the statue by Felderhoff was created in 1909 by an unknown artist. It can be found on the corner of Markgrafenstraße and Mariendorfer Damm in the Berlin district of Mariendorf
