= Tagino =

Tagino (died 9 June 1012) was the third Archbishop of Magdeburg from 1004 until his death.

Tagino was a chaplain of Henry II, Duke of Bavaria, when, in 995, the See of Regensburg became vacant. He was the duke's candidate for bishop, as well as the candidate of late bishop Saint Wolfgang, and he was elected by the congregation; but the Emperor Otto III appointed his own chaplain Gebhard and instead adopted Tagino into his own royal chaplaincy. Some strife ensued between the duke and the emperor concerning this event.

When Archbishop Gisilher died in 1004, the cathedral chapter elected as his replacement Walthard, but Henry II of Germany — the son of the old duke of Bavaria — overruled them and appointed Tagino, replacing him as his chaplain with Walthard. As archbishop, Tagino lobbied hard for his own candidates in the suffragan sees of Magdeburg. He and his suffragans were relied upon heavily for military service in the eastern marches. He also worked closely with Bernard I, Duke of Saxony, to (successfully) reconcile Henry of Schweinfurt with the Emperor.

Tagino remained close to Henry as archbishop. With famous Thietmar of Merseburg in his train, he accompanied Queen Cunigunda from Augsburg to Gernrode and thence Magdeburg in 1004 after Henry had left for his Italian campaign against Arduin. Tagino died in 1012 and was replaced by Walthard.

== Sources ==
- Reuter, Timothy. Germany in the Early Middle Ages 800–1056. New York: Longman, 1991.
- Thompson, James Westfall. Feudal Germany, Volume II. New York: Frederick Ungar Publishing Co., 1928.
- Bernhardt, John W. Itinerant Kingship and Royal Monasteries in Early Medieval Germany, c. 936–1075. Cambridge: Cambridge University Press, 1993.

== Notes ==
Tagino (aka: Tegno, Dagino, Dago, Dagan, Tagamo) Born: unknown in Dollnhofen near Regensburg Died: 9 June 1012 in Rothenburg upon Saale
Catholic Church titles
Preceded by Gisilher	Archbishop of Magdeburg; 1004–1012	Succeeded by Walthard
