= Boso of Merseburg =

Boso of Merseburg (died 1 November 970) was the first Bishop of Merseburg in Saxony-Anhalt, and "Apostle of the Wends."

Boso, a native of Bavaria, was a Benedictine monk of Saint Emmeram's in Regensburg, from where he was summoned to the court of Otto I, who, considering the conversion of the lately subjugated Wends indispensable to the security of the German Empire, sent Boso to convert them to Christianity. In the beginning Boso's mission appeared useless, because of the hatred of the Wends for the Germans who had deprived them of their liberty. Boso however studied their language in order to preach to them in their own tongue, and gradually gained their trust and respect.

In 967 or 968, Boso was able to provide for the creation of three new bishoprics based at Merseburg, Meissen and Zeitz. He chose Merseburg as his own bishopric; Hugo, another Benedictine monk, became Bishop of Zeitz, and Burchard, of Meissen. All three were consecrated on Christmas Day 968, by their metropolitan, Adalbert of Magdeburg. Boso continued his missionary labours, but died on a visit to his native Bavaria. He was succeeded by Gisilher.

Boso of Merseburg Born: unknown Died: 1 November 970
Catholic Church titles
new diocese	Bishop of Merseburg; 968–970	Succeeded by Gisilher
