= Conrad I (archbishop of Magdeburg) =

Conrad I, called Conrad of Querfurt (c. 1100 – 2 May 1142), was the archbishop of Magdeburg from 1134 until his death.

Conrad was the son of Count Gebhard of Querfurt and Countess Oda of Ammensleben. He was a second cousin of the Emperor Lothar III. His brother was Burchard I of Querfurt. His great nephew and namesake, Conrad, became bishop of Würzburg.

Conrad was a canon of Magdeburg Cathedral with the rank of subdeacon when he was chosen by a majority of the chapter as the next archbishop. Because of his rank, however, his election was quashed in favour of Norbert of Xanten. On 29 June 1134, he was elected in the presence of Lothar III to succeed Norbert. He spent much time at Lothar's court, but exerted little influence. He was present at the important diet held in Würzburg in 1136. That year, he made his brother Burchard the burggrave of Magdeburg.

In 1137, Conrad participated in Lothar's expedition to Italy. At the siege of Ancona, he repelled a sally by the defenders. He assisted in the consecration of the pope's candidate, Gregory, as archbishop of Benevento on 2 October 1137. In the 1138 Imperial election, he supported Duke Henry the Proud against the ultimate victor, Conrad III. This caused a break with his former ally, Albert the Bear, and brought military conflict to the archdiocese, during which he destroyed the castle of Plötzkau. He was buried in Magdeburg Cathedral.

Catholic Church titles
Preceded by Norbert of Xanten	Archbishop of Magdeburg; 1134–1142	Succeeded by Frederick of Wettin
