= Albert I of Käfernburg =

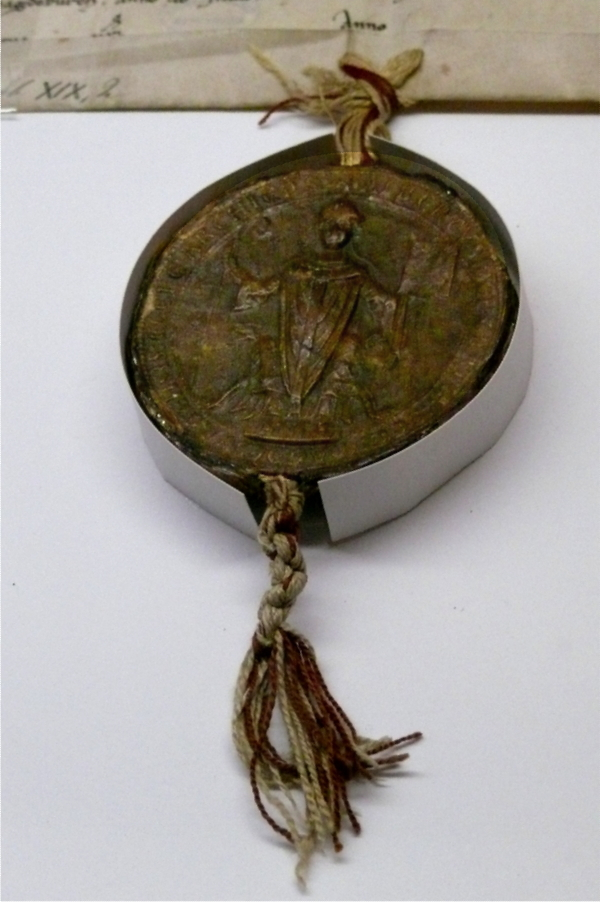
Seal of Archbishop Albert

Albert I of Käfernburg (German: Albrecht I. von Käfernburg; c. 1170 – 15 October 1232) was Archbishop of Magdeburg from 1205 until his death.

He was the son of Count Gunther II of Käfernburg (d. about 1197), a member of the Thuringian nobility and relative of the comital House of Schwarzburg, who held large estates in the area around Arnstadt. His mother was Gunther's first wife Agnes, a daughter of Count Simon I of Saarbrücken. Albert began his studies at the cathedral school in Hildesheim, completing them later at Paris and Bologna. At an early age he was made a prebendary of Magdeburg Cathedral, and in 1200 was appointed Provost of the collegiate church of St Mary in Mainz by Pope Innocent III.

Albert played a prominent part in the great struggle for the Imperial crown, which marked the close of the twelfth and the beginning of the thirteenth centuries. Even before his consecration, he had inclined to the side of the Hohenstaufen candidate Philip of Swabia, who sought the crown in spite of his minor nephew Frederick II, the son and heir of late Emperor Henry VI. In turn, through the influence of the Bishop of Halberstadt, he was nominated successor of the Magdeburg Archbishop Ludolph of Kroppenstedt who had died on 17 August 1205. After receiving the papal approbation, which was at first withheld by Innocent III, partly on account of those who had taken part in his election and partly on his account of his attitude towards King Philip, Albert proceeded to Rome, where he was consecrated bishop by the Pope on 24 December 1206 and received the pallium.

Albert entered the city of Magdeburg on Palm Sunday, 15 April 1207, and five days later – on Good Friday – a conflagration destroyed many of the buildings in the city, including his own cathedral. One of his first cares was to repair the damage wrought by fire, and in 1208 he laid the cornerstone of the present cathedral, an early example of the Gothic architecture in Germany which, though completed 156 years later, serves as his most fitting memorial. He likewise rebuilt a large part of the city, and is regarded as the founder of Magdeburg's Alte Neustadt quarter. Albert did much to further the interest of Catholicism. He established the Dominicans (1224), and the Franciscans (1225) in the city, and also founded a convent for women in honour of St. Mary Magdalene.

Albert's activity was not confined to his diocese. In the German throne quarrel, he increasingly came under pressure from the Welf aspirant Otto of Brunswick. Otto, a younger son of Henry the Lion, had been set up as anti-king to Philip of Swabia by a party headed by Archbishop Adolphus of Cologne and crowned King of the Romans at Aachen Cathedral. Archbishop Albert finally accepted the papal "deliberation" and signed a support agreement with Otto in July 1208. After the assassination of Philip in June 1208, Albert did much to have his rival acknowledged as king. He accompanied him to Rome, where Otto was crowned emperor by Pope Innocent III on 4 October 1209. Magdeburg was indebted to Albert for several valuable privileges which he obtained from the Welf emperor.

However, Otto soon broke off relations. Still in Italy, he seized Ancona and Spoleto – part of the papal territories – and installed his vassal Dipold as Duke of Spoleto. Upon attempting to enter the Kingdom of Sicily, Otto was excommunicated by Pope Innocent III on 18 November 1210, and his subjects released from their allegiance. Albert, after some hesitation, published the bull of excommunication and thenceforth transferred his allegiance to Frederick II. While Albert prepared the Frederick's election as King of the Romans in 1212, Otto returned to Germany and defied the Pope. The struggles that followed, in which Magdeburg and its neighbourhood suffered severely, did not come to an end until Otto's power was finally broken at the Battle of Bouvines in 1214.

Albert's later years were overshadowed by a feud with the young Brandenburg margraves John I and Otto III. In 1222 he accompanied Frederick II to Italy and made several efforts to arbitrate between the Empire and the Papacy. Albert is said to have died in Cividale, during an interval of peace in 1232. His mortal remains were transferred to Magdeburg Cathedral. Albert's younger half-brother Wilbrand became dean of Magdeburg Cathedral in 1233 and Archbishop in 1235.

Preceded by Ludolf of Kroppenstedt	Archbishop of Magdeburg; 1205–1232	Succeeded by Burkhard I of Woldenberg
