= Bishopric of Merseburg =

Roman Catholic diocese

Prince-Bishopric of Merseburg Hochstift Merseburg
- 1004–1565
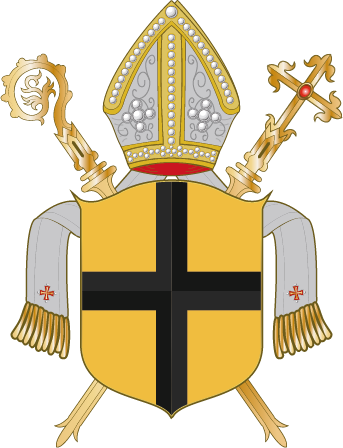
- Coat of arms

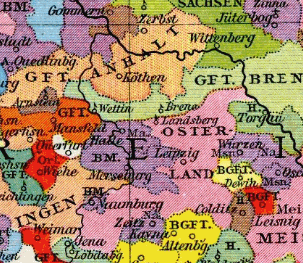
- Bishoprics of Merseburg, Naumburg and Zeitz (violet) about 1250
- Status: Prince-Bishopric
- Capital: Merseburg
- Common languages: Upper Saxon
- Religion: Roman Catholic
- Government: Ecclesiastical principality
- Historical era: Middle Ages
  - Bishopric established: 967
  - Prince-bishopric: 1004
  - Turned Protestant: 1544
  - Incorporated by Saxony: 1565
Preceded by	Succeeded by
Duchy of Saxony	Electorate of Saxony

The Bishopric of Merseburg was an episcopal see on the eastern border of the medieval Duchy of Saxony with its centre in Merseburg, where Merseburg Cathedral was constructed. The see was founded in 967 by Emperor Otto I at the same time in the same manner as those of Meissen and Zeitz (from 1029: Naumburg), all suffragan dioceses of the Archbishopric of Magdeburg as part of a plan to bind the adjacent Slavic ("Wendish") lands in the Saxon Eastern March beyond the Saale River more closely to the Holy Roman Empire.

The prince-bishopric was re-established by King Henry II of Germany in 1004. It then covered a considerable small territory stretching from the Saale up to the Mulde River and the Margraviate of Meissen in the east.

== History ==
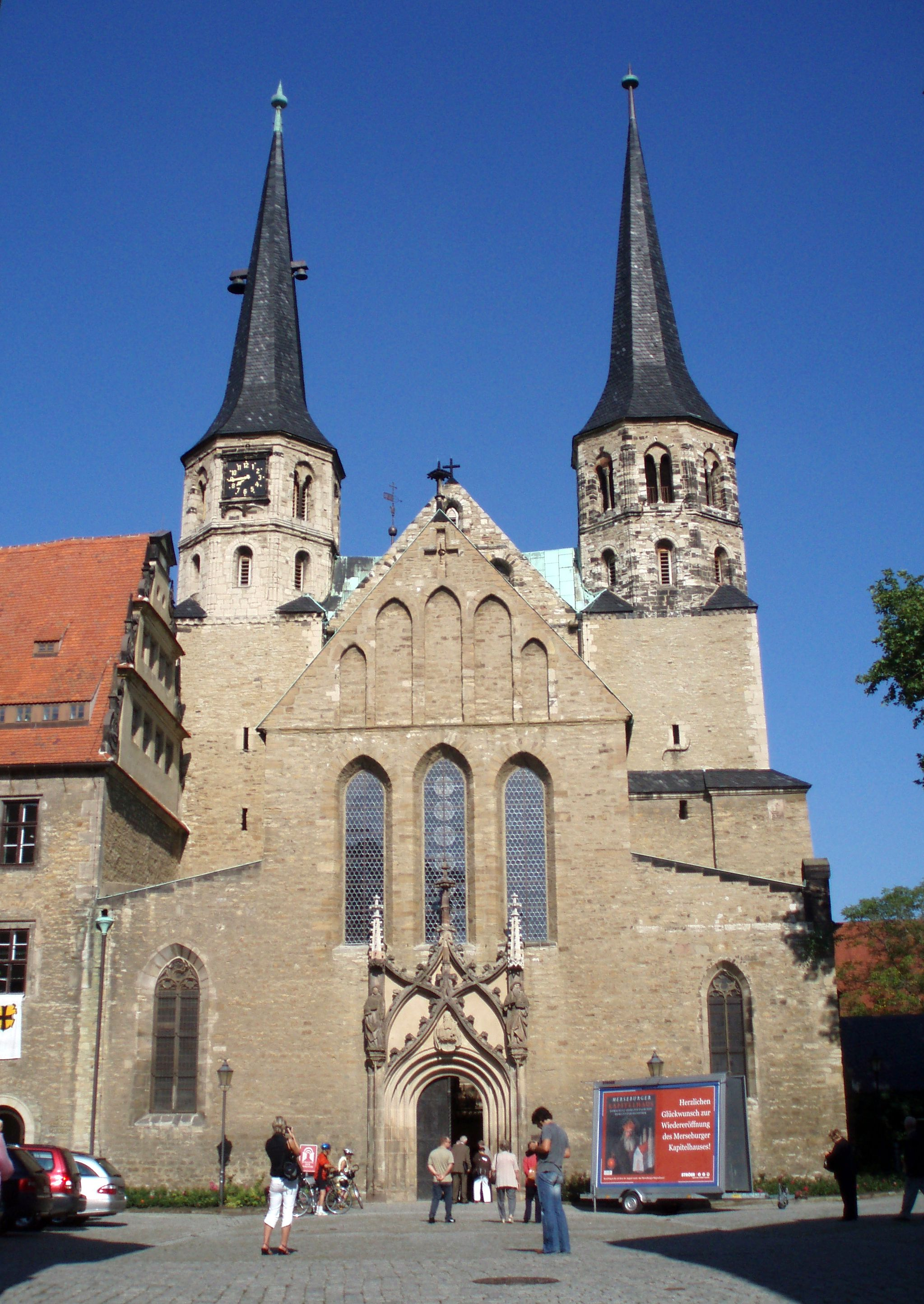
Merseburg Cathedral

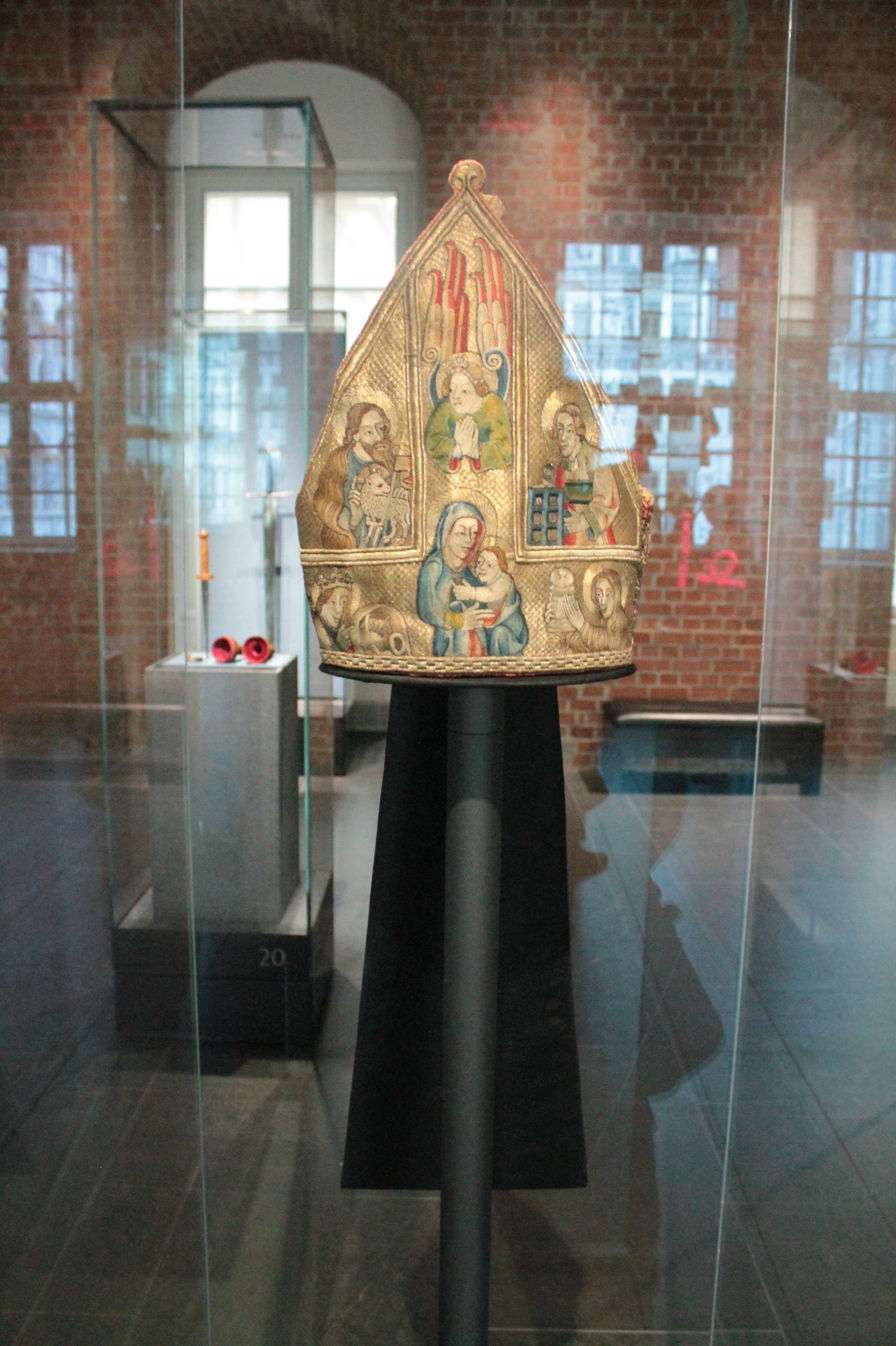
Mitre of Friedrich II von Holm, Bishop of Merseburg 1357–1382, Rustkammer museum, Dresden

About 919 Otto's father King Henry the Fowler had a Kaiserpfalz erected in Merseburg in the Eastphalian Hassegau, hometown of his first wife, Hatheburg of Merseburg. The establishment of the diocese traced back to a vow Otto took before his victory against the Hungarians at the Battle of Lechfeld on Saint Laurence day, 10 August 955. Confirmed by Pope John XIII at the 968 synod in Ravenna, the first Merseburg bishop was Boso, a Bavarian monk descending from St. Emmeram's Abbey in Regensburg (Ratisbon), already distinguished by his missionary labours among the pagan Sorbs.

Boso's successor Gisilher, a confidant of the new Emperor Otto II, from 971 procured the suppression of the see in favour of his aims to become Archbishop of Magdeburg, finally reached through the Emperor's power over Pope Benedict VII in 981. However this step was clearly against the interests of the Church and the position of Magdeburg archbishopric was decisively enfeebled after the Great Slav Rising of 983, therefore the dissolution was revoked by the papacy in 998 or early in 999 at a Roman synod. Upon Archbishop Gisilher's death in 1004, King Henry II re-established the prince-bishopric; the diocese did not, however, recover all its former territory, and was now almost exclusively a missionary jurisdiction among the Sorbs, who were not fully converted to Christianity until the middle of the 12th century.

Under Bishop Thietmar (1009–1018) the erection of Merseburg Cathedral began, it was consecrated in 1021 in presence of Emperor Henry II. During the Investiture Controversy the Merseburg bishops sided with Pope Gregory VII and also joined the Great Saxon Revolt, which, however, could not stop the dwindling importance of the small diocese. From the 13th century onwards, the bishops had to deal with rising power of the Meissen margraves of the Wettin dynasty, from 1423 Electors of Saxony, who by denying Merseburg's Imperial immediacy attempted to acquire the overlordship. By the 1485 Treaty of Leipzig the Wettins allocated the protectorate over Merseburg to Duke Albert III of Saxony.

The bishopric's fate was sealed with the Protestant Reformation, which was enforced here during the episcopate of Prince Adolph II of Anhalt, who was driven out of office by his uprising subjects during the German Peasants' War in 1525. In 1544 Elector Augustus of Saxony finally assumed the rule as Protestant administrator, with Prince George III of Anhalt as Coadjutor bishop. In 1561 the Saxon elector installed his minor son Alexander as administrator, who nevertheless died four years later, whereafter the Bishopric of Merseburg was finally incorporated by the Saxon electorate. From 1652 to 1738 the descendants of the Wettin duke Christian I held the title of a "Duke of Saxe-Merseburg".

At the 1815 Congress of Vienna, three-fourths of the former diocesan territory was assigned to the Kingdom of Prussia, the rest remaining Saxon; the religious attitude of the people was by that time almost entirely Lutheran.

== Incumbents of the see of Merseburg ==
=== Bishops of Merseburg ===
- 967–970: Boso
- 971–981: Gisilher
- 981–1004: diocese dissolved

=== Prince-Bishops of Merseburg ===
- 1004–1009: Wigbert
- 1009–1018: Thietmar of Walbeck
- 1019–1036: Bruno (bishop of Merseburg)
- 1036–1050: Hunold
- 1050–1053: Alberich
- 1053: Winther
- 1053–1057: Ezzelin I
- 1057–1062: Offo (also Uffo, Onuphrius, or Woffo)
- 1062–1063: Günther (also Winithar)
- 1063–1093: Werner of Wolkenburg
- 1075: Eberhard (anti-bishop)
- 1093–1097: sede vacante
- 1097–1112: Albuin
- 1112–1120: Gerard (Gerhard)
- 1120–1126: Arnold
- 1126–1140: Megingoz (also Meingod)
- 1140–1140: Henry I
- 1140–1143: Ezzelin II (also Eckhelm)
- 1143–1151: Raynard (Reinhard) of Querfurt
- 1151–1170: John I (Johann)
- 1171–1201: Count Eberhard of Seeburg
- 1201–1215: Derek of Meissen (Dietrich von Meißen)
- 1215–1240: Ekkehard Rabil (also Engelhard)
- 1240–1244: Rudolph of Webau
- 1244–1265: Henry II of Waren
- 1265: Albert I of Borna (Albrecht)
- 1265–1283: Frederick I of Torgau
- 1283–1300: Henry III (von Amendorf)
- 1300–1319: Henry IV
- 1320–1340: Gebhard of Schrapelau (or Schraplau)
- 1341–1357: Henry of Stolberg (1270–1357)|Henry V, Count of Stolberg
- 1357–1382: Frederick of Hoym (bishop)
- 1382–1384: Burkhard of Querfurt
- 1382–1385: Andreas Dauba (anti-bishop)
- 1384–1393: Henry VI, Count of Stolberg
- 1393–1403: Henry VII, treasurer from Orlamünde
- 1403–1406: Otto of Honstein
- 1406: Bishop Elect Henry of Stolberg (coadjutor)
- 1407–1411: Walter von Köckeritz
- 1411–1431: Nikolaus Lubich
- 1431–1463: John II of Bose (Johannes; 23 May 1431 - 3 October 1463)
- 1464–1466: John III of Bose (Johannes; January 1464 - 11 July 1466)
- 1466–1514: Thilo of Trotha (21 Jul 1466 - 5 Mar 1514)
- 1514–1526: Adolph of Anhalt (5 March 1514 - 23 March 1526)
- 1526–1535: Vincent of Schleinitz (Vinzenz; 9 April 1526 - 21 March 1535)
- 1535–1544: Sigismund of Lindenau (3 April 1535 - 4 January 1544)

=== Lutheran Administrator and coadjutor ===
- 1544–1548: Augustus of Saxony, as administrator
  - 1544–1549: George of Anhalt, as Lutheran coadjutor

=== Prince-Bishop ===
- 1549–1561: Michael Helding (28 May 1549 - 30 September 1561)

=== Lutheran Administrator ===
- 1561–1565: Alexander of Saxony
  - In 1565 the prince-bishopric was annexed to the Electorate of Saxony
