= Gero (archbishop of Magdeburg) =

Archbishop of Magdeburg from 1012 to 1023

Gero (died 21 October 1023) was the Archbishop of Magdeburg from 1012 until his death. He was a son of Dedo Wodenswege and Eilika (Eilica) and possibly a relative of the family of Gero the Great.

Gero was the candidate of King Henry II following the death of the Archbishop Walthard on 12 August 1012. He was appointed over the candidate, Otto, of the cathedral canons. Between 1016 and 1017, the ambitious Gero and Bernard, Margrave of the Nordmark, feuded over territory. Bernard's men attacked Magdeburg, but in 1017 he agreed to compensate Gero with 500 pounds of silver.

== Sources ==
- Reuter, Timothy. Germany in the Early Middle Ages 800–1056. New York: Longman, 1991.

== Notes ==
Gero Born: unknown Died: 22 October 1023 in Vadderode (today's Mansfeld-Vatterode)
Catholic Church titles
Preceded by Walthard	Archbishop of Magdeburg; 1012–1023	Succeeded by Humphrey
