= Günther I of Schwalenberg =

Archbishop of Magdeburg and Bishop of Paderborn

- Died: 1310 or shortly thereafter probably in Marienmünster abbey
- Noble family: von Schwalenberg
- Father: Volkwin IV, Count of Schwalenberg
- Mother: Ermengard of Schwarzburg

Günther I of Schwalenberg was a German nobleman. He was elected Archbishop of Magdeburg in 1277, but had to step down in 1278. He was Bishop of the Bishopric of Paderborn from 1307 to 15 May 1310.

== Background ==
Günther relatives were the Counts of Schwalenberg. They were Vogts of the Bishopric of Paderborn and founders of the abbey in Marienmünster. They had a lot of influence on the clerical positions in Westphalia. Günther was a son of Count Volkwin IV and his wife Ermengard of Schwarzburg. His parents had eleven children. His brother Volkwin V was Bishop of Minden. His cousin Widukind of Waldeck was Bishop of Osnabrück from 1265 to 1269, and his nephew Conrad II of Sternberg was Archbishop of Magdeburg from 1266 to 1277. Three of Günter's sisters were abbesses: Kunigunde in Falkenhagen Abbey in Lügde, Ermengard in Neuenheerse, and Mathilda in Möllenbeck Abbey, near Rinteln.

== Life ==
In 1268, Günther became provost in the Dionysius monastery in Enger, and also canon in Magdeburg where his nephew Conrad was archbishop. In 1272, he became thesaurer in Minden and cathedral custodian in Magdeburg. He was also dean in Goslar. In 1273, he became vice-dominus in Magdeburg, later provost.

Conrad died in 1277 and Günther succeeded him, after a disputed election, in which he defeated Bernard III of Wölpe, the cathedral cellarer. An important condition for his election was that the finances of the cathedral, for which he had been responsible as thesaurer, should be in order.

Around that time, a feud broke out, because Margrave Otto IV of Brandenburg wanted his younger brother Eric elected as Archbishop, and had made an alliance with the Duke of Saxony against Günther. Otto's troops raided the archbishopric, and the monastery and surrounding areas suffered badly. Günther, supported by a strong force from the City of Magdeburg, defeated Otto in battles at Aken and Frohse (10 January 1278). However, Günther grew tired of fighting Otto and in March 1278, he abdicated, even before he had been confirmed and consecrated. He was succeeded by his former opponent Bernard III of Wölpe. However, Pope Martin IV appointed Eric as Archbishop of Magdeburg. In 1282, Bernard abdicated and Eric was consecrated as his successor.

In 1307, Günther was elected Bishop of Paderborn. His election was confirmed by the ecclesiastical province of Mainz and Emperor Henry VII transferred the regalia of Paderborn to him. However, he turned out to be a weak ruler. His provost, Bernard V of Lippe de facto administered the bishopric. In 1308, Bernard vouched for Günther and in 1309, he chaired the Permanent Council as "Defender and Tutor of the safety of the Bishop". Günther abdicated in 1310 and was succeeded by his cousin Dietrich II of Itter.

He probably retired to the abbey in Marienmünster. He probably died shortly after his abdication, but the exact date is unknown. He was probably buried in the church of Marienmünster abbey.

Günther I of Schwalenberg von Schwalenberg
Preceded by Conrad II	Archbishop of Magdeburg; 1277-1278	Succeeded by Bernard III
Preceded by Otto	Bishop of Paderborn; 1307-1310	Succeeded by Dietrich II
