= Eric of Brandenburg =

Archbishop of Magdeburg

- Born: c. 1245
- Died: 21 December 1295
- Noble family: House of Ascania
- Father: John I, Margrave of Brandenburg
- Mother: Sophia of Denmark

Eric of Brandenburg (c. 1245 – 21 December 1295) was Archbishop of Magdeburg from 1283 until his death.

== Life ==
Eric was a younger son of Margrave John I of Brandenburg. From an early age, he was destined for a career in the clergy. In the 1360s and 1370s, he appears in documents as canon and dean of the Monastery St. Boniface and St. Maurice in Halberstadt. His brothers, the Margraves of Brandenburg, tried, undoubtedly for political reasons, to have him appointed as canon and later as archbishop in Magdeburg. On 20 June 1264, Pope Urban IV ordered the chapter in Magdeburg to accept Eric as a canon, however, the chapter ignored this order. Later attempts to gain a foothold in the archbishopric were also unsuccessful. On 1 May 1272, archbishop Conrad II of Magdeburg created a defensive alliance with the Princes of Werle, Rugia and Mecklenburg, against the Margraves of Brandenburg.

After Conrad II died in 1272, a split occurred in the cathedral chapter in Magdeburg. One party preferred Eric, who was supported by his brother Margrave Otto and his cousin Duke Albert of Brunswick. The other party preferred Canon Burchard of Querfurt. The two parties were at the brink of war when a settlement was reached: neither candidate was elected, instead the post was offered to Günther I of Schwalenberg. Peace, however, did not last long. War soon broke out between the newly elected archbishop and Margrave Otto IV, who was defeated and captured in the Battle of Frohse on 10 January 1278. The feud against Magdeburg continued after his release.

Eric was finally elected in 1283, after Günther had abdicated in 1278 and his successor, Bernard of Wölpe, resigned in 1282. He only held the archbishop's chair for twelve years; however, this period turned out to be highly significant for the constitutional history of the city. There were many feuds early in his reign, and fighting them was expensive. The citizens of Magdeburg were initially unhappy with his election, because they viewed him as the brother of the bellicose Margrave; the city had often suffered hardships during his many wars.

In 1284, Eric had to combat a revolt by ministeriales in his territory. He called in assistance from his brother. The revolt was quenched. However, Otto demanded he be compensated for the cost incurred, and Eric had to pledge Lusatia to him.

His subjects changed their view of him when events began to unfold. When Eric was taken prisoner in 1284 during the siege of Harlingberg castle in the Duchy of Brunswick, the citizens of Magdeburg paid his ransom. Several years later, Eric concluded an alliance at the Diet in Erfurt with Bishop Siegfried II of Hildesheim and other princes to maintain the public peace in the area. When this alliance attacked Harlingberg again in 1291, they were successful and the castle was conquered and destroyed.

The many feuds and the resultant financial difficulties gave the citizens of Magdeburg, who were struggling for greater independence, the opportunity to purchase several important privileges from the archbishop. In a deed dated 17 January 1292, he undertook to not use the property of the cathedral chapter or to citizens of Magdeburg to pay the cost of a feud. Instead, if war threatened, he would, with permission of the chapter and the citizens, levy a tax, which would not exceed the subject's ability to pay. In later years, the city acquired other important benefits.

In 1293, the larger guilds objected the large influence the nobility had on the city government. After these guilds did well in the council elections, the council sought to shift power from the magistrates to the council. All sorts of allegations were made against the magistrates and it came to violent scenes between the magistrates and the council. The council impounded the book in which all land transfers were registered and demanded that it be kept under auspices of the Burding, the citizen's council, rather than under the auspices of the Burgrave's court and the Schultheiß. The key of the book was taken away from the magistrates. In the following year, the archbishop gave in to these demands. Duke Albert I of Saxony sold the post of Burgrave of Magdeburg for 900 Marks to Eric, who was reimbursed by the city. Eric undertook to enfeoff the same person with the posts of Burgrave and Schultheiß. Lay magistrates were to be selected by the city council and the five guild masters and their selection confirmed by the archbishop. Conveyancing would henceforth be done in the Burgrave's court. Later that year, the city also purchased the post of Schultheiß. Thus, the city council found itself in a significantly different position: they now needed to realize their newly gained powers vis-à-vis the magistrates. In March 1295, the city council transferred jurisdiction of real estate and inheritance cases to the Burgrave's court, allowing the magistrates to focus on criminal offences. The magistrates objected to this transfer. The city council also used its privilege to select new magistrates, ignoring objections from the old magistrates who were still in office.

Archbishop Eric did what he could to combat feuds and brigandage. He made some large donations to various religious institutions, in particular to Lehnin Abbey, where the Ascanian margraves were buried.

Eric of Brandenburg House of Ascania Born: c. 1245
Preceded by Bernard of Wolpe	Archbishop of Magdeburg; 1283-1295	Succeeded by Burchard II of Blankenburg
