= Archbishopric of Magdeburg =

Former archdiocese of the Catholic Church

Archbishopric of Magdeburg: Erzstift Magdeburg (German); Archiepiscopatus Magdeburgensis (Latin)
- 1180–1680
- Coat of arms

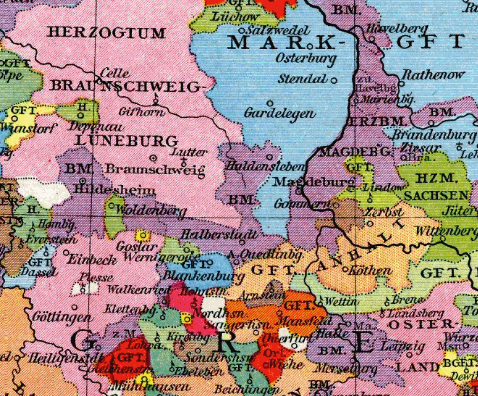
- Prince-Bishoprics of Hildesheim, Halberstadt and Magdeburg (violet), about 1250
- Status: Prince-Archbishopric
- Capital: Magdeburg; Halle (from 1503)
- Common languages: Eastphalian
- Government: Hochstift
- Historical era: Middle Ages
  - Archbishopric founded by Emperor Otto I: 968
  - Conquered Jüterbog: 1157 1180
  - Gained immediacy at breakup of Saxony: 1180
  - Subdued Halle: 1478
  - Lower Saxon Circle: 1500
  - Albert of Brandenburg elected archbishop: 1513
  - Secularization: 1680
Preceded by	Succeeded by
Duchy of Saxony	Duchy of Magdeburg

The Archbishopric of Magdeburg was a Latin Catholic archdiocese (969–1552) and Prince-Archbishopric (1180–1680) of the Holy Roman Empire centered on the city of Magdeburg on the Elbe River.

Planned since 955 and established in 967, the archdiocese had de facto turned void since 1557, when the last papally confirmed prince-archbishop, the Lutheran Sigismund of Brandenburg came of age and ascended to the see. All his successors were only administrators of the prince-archbishopric and Lutheran too, except the Catholic cleric Leopold William of Austria (1631–1635). In ecclesiastical respect the remaining Catholics and their parishes and abbeys in the former archdiocese were put under supervision of the Archdiocese of Cologne in 1648 and under the jurisdiction of the Apostolic Vicariate of the Northern Missions in 1670.

In political respect the Erzstift, the archiepiscopal and capitular temporalities, had gained imperial immediacy as a prince-archbishopric in 1180. Its territory comprised only some parts of the archdiocesan area, such as the city of Magdeburg, the bulk of the Magdeburg Börde, and the Jerichow Land as an integral whole and exclaves in parts of the Saalkreis including Halle upon Saale, Oebisfelde and environs as well as Jüterbog and environs. The prince-archbishopric maintained its statehood as an elective monarchy until 1680. Then the Brandenburg-Prussia the prince-archbishopric of Magdeburg. After being secularised, the state was transformed into the Duchy of Magdeburg, a hereditary monarchy in personal union with Brandenburg.

The 1994-founded modern Diocese of Magdeburg is a diocese of the Latin Church of the Catholic Church located in the German states of Saxony-Anhalt (bulk), Brandenburg and Saxony (smaller fringes each).

== History ==
The town was one of the oldest emporia of the German trade for the Wends who dwelt on the right bank of the Elbe. In 805 it is first mentioned in history. In 806 Charlemagne built a fortress on the eastern bank of the river opposite Magdeburg. The oldest church is also credited to this time.

Magdeburg first played an important part in the history of Germany during the reign of Otto the Great (936-73). In 929 King Otto I granted the city to his English-born wife Edith as dower. She had a particular love for the town and often lived there. The emperor also continually returned to it. In September 937, Otto and his wife founded a Benedictine monastery at Magdeburg, which was dedicated to Sts. Peter, Maurice, and the Holy Innocents. The first abbots and monks came from St. Maximin's Abbey, Trier.

After the wars of the years 940 and 954, the Polabian Slavs as far as the Oder, had been brought into subjection to German rule. However, the Magyars had advanced so far into Germany, that Augsburg was threatened. At the Battle of Lechfeld in 955 they were defeated and repelled. Otto immediately set to work to establish an archbishopric in Magdeburg, for the stabilisation through Christianisation of the eastern territories. He wished to transfer the capital of the diocese from Halberstadt to Magdeburg, and make it an archdiocese. But this was strenuously opposed by the Archbishop of Mainz, who was the metropolitan of Halberstadt.

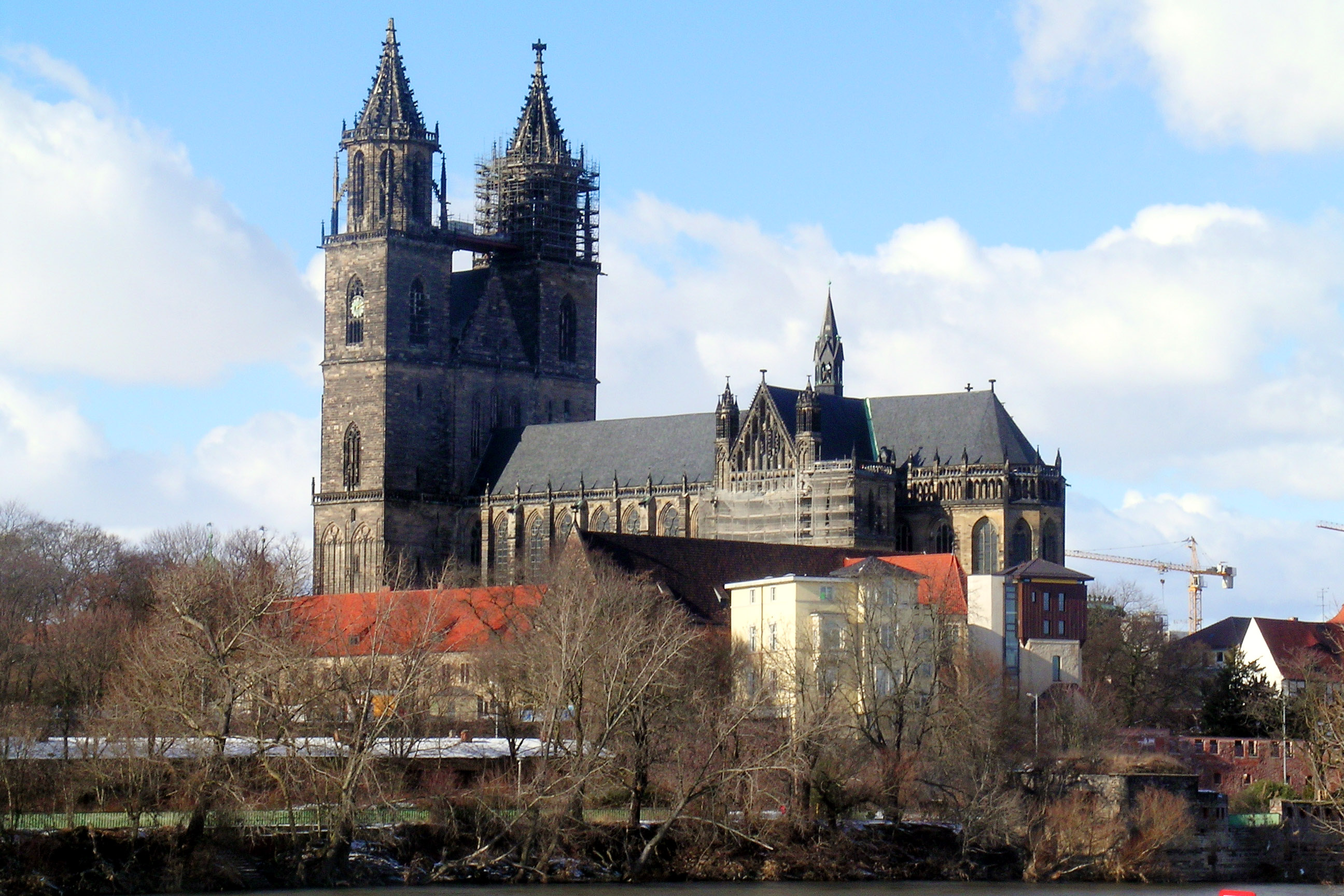
Cathedral of Magdeburg

When, in 962, Pope John XII sanctioned the establishment of an archbishopric, Otto seemed to have abandoned his plan of a transfer. The estates belonging to the convent founded in 937 were converted into a mense for the new archbishopric, and the monks transferred to the Berge Convent. The abbey church became the Cathedral of St. Maurice.

Its ecclesiastical province included the existing dioceses of Brandenburg and Havelberg and the newly founded dioceses of Merseburg, Zeitz, and Meißen. (Lebus was added in 1424.) The new archdiocese was close to the unsecured border regions of the Holy Roman Empire and Slavic tribes, and was meant to promote Christianity among the many Slavs and others. On 20 April 967, the archbishopric was solemnly established at the Synod of Ravenna in the presence of the pope and the emperor. The first archbishop was Adelbert, a former monk of St. Maximin's at Trier, afterwards a missionary bishop to the Ruthenians (Ruthenia), and Abbot of Weissenburg in Alsace. He was elected in the autumn of 968, received the pallium at Rome, and at the end of the year was solemnly enthroned in Magdeburg.

The archdiocesan area of Magdeburg was rather small; it comprised the Slavonic districts of Serimunt, Nudizi, Neletici, Nizizi, and half of northern Thuringia, which Halberstadt resigned. The cathedral school especially gained in importance under Adalbert's efficient administration. The scholastic Othrich was considered the most learned man of his times. Many eminent men were educated at Magdeburg.

Othrich was chosen archbishop after Adalbert's death (981). Gisiler of Merseburg obtained possession of the See of Magdeburg by bribery and fraud. Upon his death in 1004, there followed a brief conflict between King Henry II and the cathedral canons before Tagino was installed as archbishop. Tagino and his suffragans were relied upon heavily for military service in the eastern marches.

Among successors worthy of mention are the zealous Gero (1012–23) and St. Norbert, prominent in the 12th century (1126–34), the founder of the Premonstratensian order.

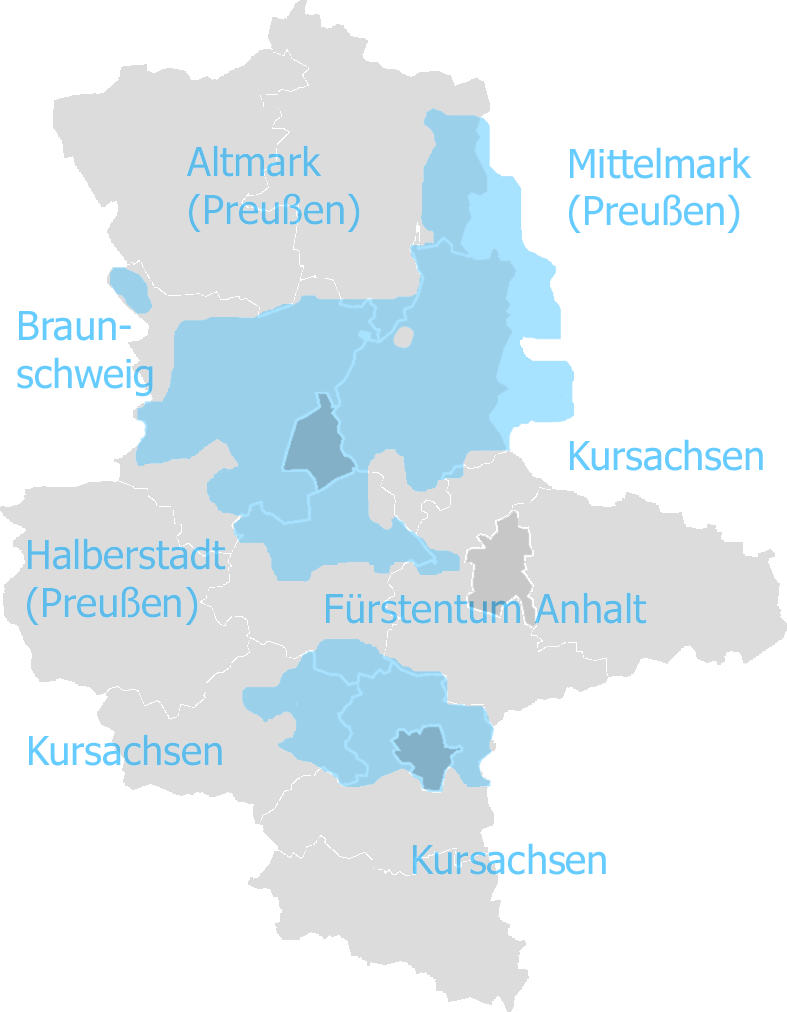
Political territory of the Prince-Archbishopric (lacking Jüterbog exclave) by 1648, over present-day Saxony-Anhalt

Archbishop Wichmann (1152–92) was more important as a sovereign and prince of the Holy Roman Empire than as a bishop. Wichmann sided with the emperor in the Great Saxon Revolt and was rewarded by recognising the archepiscopal and the cathedral capitular temporalities as a state of imperial immediacy within the Holy Roman Empire, thus Wichmann was the first to add the title secular prince to his ecclesiastical archbishop. Albrecht II (1205–32) quarrelled with Otto II, Margrave of Brandenburg (1198–1215), because he had pronounced the pope's ban against the latter and this war greatly damaged the archbishopric. In 1208 he began to build the present Cathedral of Magdeburg, which was only consecrated in 1263, and never entirely finished; Günther I (1277–79) hardly escaped a serious war with the Margrave Otto IV, who was incensed because his brother Eric of Brandenburg had not been elected archbishop. The Brandenburgers succeeded in forcing Günther I and Bernard III (1279–1281) to resign and in making Eric archbishop (1283–1295).

Cardinal Albert of Brandenburg (1513–45), on account of his insecure position, as well as being crippled by a perpetual lack of funds, gave some occasion for the spread of Lutheranism in his diocese, although himself opposing the Reformation. It is not true that he became a Lutheran and wished to retain his see as a secular principality, and just as untrue that in the Kalbe Parliament in 1541 he consented to the introduction of the Reformation in order to have his debts paid. His successors were the zealous Catholics John Albert of Brandenburg-Ansbach (1545–1550), who however could accomplish very little, and Frederick IV of Brandenburg, who died in 1552.

Administrators who were secular princes now took the place of the archbishop, and they, as well as the majority of the cathedral chapter and the inhabitants of the archdiocese, were usually Protestant. They belonged to the Hohenzollern House of Brandenburg, which had adopted Calvinism in 1613. Christian William was taken prisoner in 1631 after the sack of Magdeburg, and went over to the Catholic Church in Vienna. At the time of the Peace of Prague (1635), the Archbishopric of Magdeburg fell to August, Duke of Saxe-Weissenfels. In the Treaty of Westphalia (1648), the expectancy to the archbishopric was promised to Brandenburg-Prussia upon the death of August. When the Saxon prince died in 1680, the archbishopric was secularised by Brandenburg and transformed into the Duchy of Magdeburg.

The remaining Catholics in the area were under the jurisdiction of the Apostolic Vicariate of the Northern Missions between 1670 and 1709, and again from 1780 to 1821. Between 1709 and 1780 the Apostolic Vicariate of Upper and Lower Saxony was the competent Catholic jurisdiction. In 1821, the area was transferred in Catholic respect to the Diocese of Paderborn. In 1994, the Diocese of Magdeburg was founded in the area.

== Archbishops and administrators ==
=== Archbishops of Magdeburg ===
- Adalbert 968–981
- Giselmar 981–1004
- Tagino 1004–1012
- Waltaro 1012
- Gero 1012–1023
- Humfrid 1023–1051
- Engelhard 1052–1063
- Werner of Steutzlingen 1064–1078
- Hartwig of Spanheim 1079–1102
- Henry I of Assel 1102–1107
- Adalgod of Osterberg 1107–1119
- Rudigar of Baltheim 1119–1125
- Norbert of Xanten 1126–1134
- Conrad I of Querfurt 1134–1142
- Frederick of Wettin 1142–1152
- Wichmann von Seeburg 1152–1180; prince-archbishop to 1192; Bishop of Naumburg, 1150–54

1180: Gained Imperial immediacy on breakup of duchy of Saxony

=== Prince-archbishops of Magdeburg ===
- Wichmann von Seeburg 1180–1192; archbishop from 1152
- Ludolf of Koppenstedt 1192–1205
- Albert I of Käfernburg 1205–1232
- Burkhard I of Woldenberg 1232–1235
- Wilbrand of Kasernberg 1235–1254
- Rudolf of Dinselstadt 1254–1260
- Rupert of Mansfeld 1260–1266
- Conrad II of Sternberg 1266–1277
- Günther I of Schwalenberg 1277–1279
- Bernhard III of Wolpe 1279–1282
- Eric of Brandenburg 1282–1295
- Burkhard II of Blankenburg 1295–1305
- Henry III, Prince of Anhalt-Aschersleben 1305–1307
- Burkhard III of Mansfeld-Schrapglau 1307–1325
- Heideke of Erssa 1326–1327
- Otto of Hesse 1327–1361
- Dietrich Kagelwit 1361–1367
- Albert II of Sternberg 1367–1372
- Peter Gelvto 1372–1381
- Louis of Meissen 1381–1382
- Frederick II of Hoym 1382
- Albert III of Querfurt 1382–1403
- Günther II of Schwarzburg 1403–1445
- Frederick III of Beichlingen 1445–1464
- John II of Palatinate-Simmern 1464–1475
- Ernest II of Saxony 1475–1480; prince-archbishop to 1513

1480: Prince-Bishopric of Halberstadt administered by archbishops of Magdeburg

=== Prince-archbishops of Magdeburg, administrators of Halberstadt ===
- Ernest II of Saxony 1480–1513; prince-archbishop from 1475
- Albert IV of Brandenburg 1513–1545; also archbishop-elector of Mainz from 1514–1545
- John Albert of Brandenburg-Ansbach 1545–1551
- Frederick IV of Brandenburg 1551–1552; Frederick III as administrator of Halberstadt
- Sigismund of Brandenburg 1552–1566; papally confirmed as archbishop although Lutheran, since the Holy See still expected the new schism to be a temporary phenomenon

1566: Archdiocese ruled by Lutheran administrators

=== Administrators of Magdeburg ===
- Joachim Frederick of Brandenburg 1566–1598
- Christian William of Brandenburg 1598–1631
- Leopold William of Austria, a layman, Catholic administrator, 1631–1638; also administrator of the prince-bishoprics of Passau (1625–1662), of Strasbourg (1626–1662), of Halberstadt (1628–1648), of Olmütz (1632–1662) and of Breslau (1656–1662) and de jure of the prince-archbishopric of Bremen (1635–1645)
- Augustus, Duke of Saxe-Weissenfels, Count of Barby, 1638–1680

1680: Prince-Archbishopric secularised to duchy

== Ecclesiastical Province of Magdeburg ==
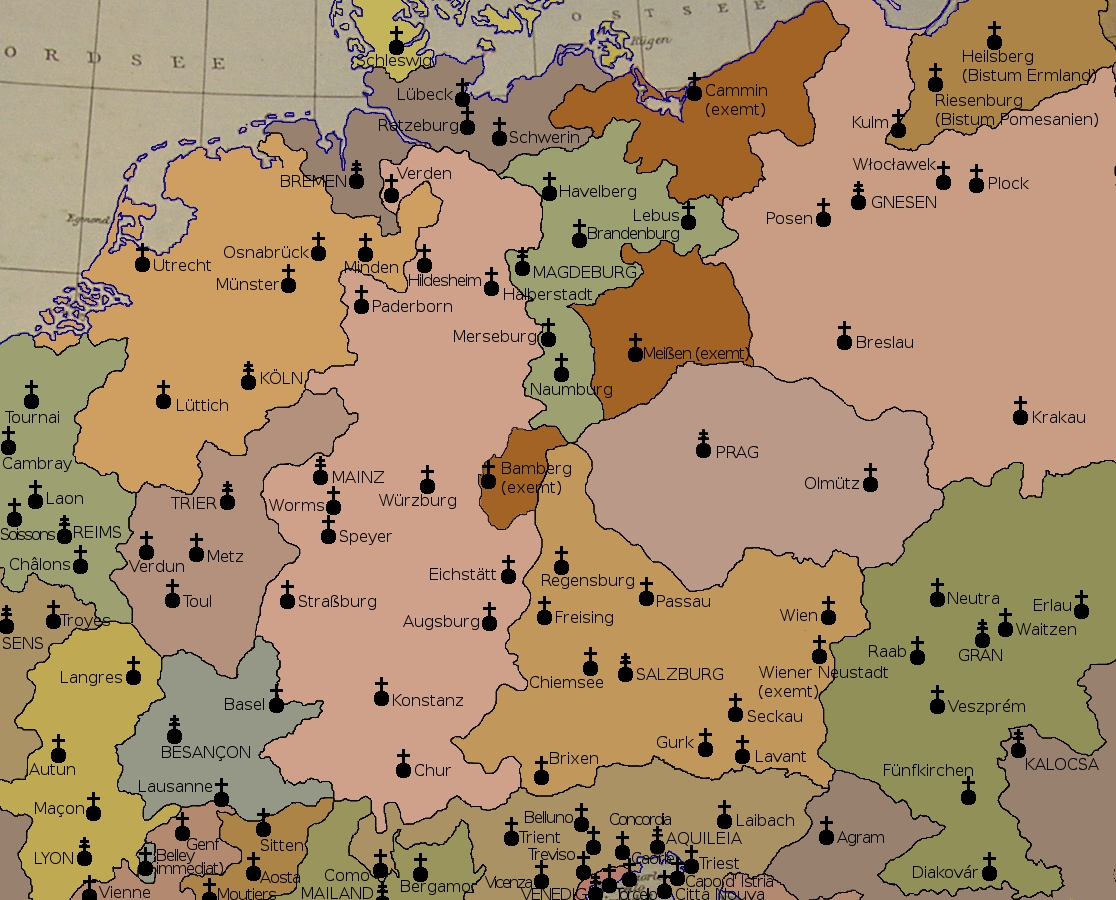
Ecclesiastical Province of Magdeburg (in green) amidst other provinces in Central Europe.

The archbishop of Magdeburg was the metropolitan of the Ecclesiastical Province of Magdeburg (de facto dissolved in 1648), with the archbishops also holding – besides the archbishop-elector of Mainz – the honorary title Primas Germaniae. The suffragans of Magdeburg were:

- Diocese of Brandenburg, Lutheran since 1539, the pertaining prince-bishopric secularised and merged into the Electorate of Brandenburg in 1571.
- Diocese of Havelberg, Lutheran since 1558, the pertaining prince-bishopric secularised and merged into the Electorate of Brandenburg in 1598.
- Diocese of Lebus since 1424 (before suffragan to Gniezno), Lutheran since 1555, pertaining temporalities (County of Beeskow) secularised and merged into the Electorate of Brandenburg in 1598.
- Diocese of Merseburg, Lutheran since 1544, the pertaining prince-bishopric secularised and merged into the Electorate of Saxony in 1565
- Diocese of Naumburg-Zeitz, Lutheran between 1542 and 1547 and from 1562 on, the pertaining prince-bishopric secularised and merged into the Electorate of Saxony in 1615

== Residences ==
Residences of the Archbishops of Magdeburg were:

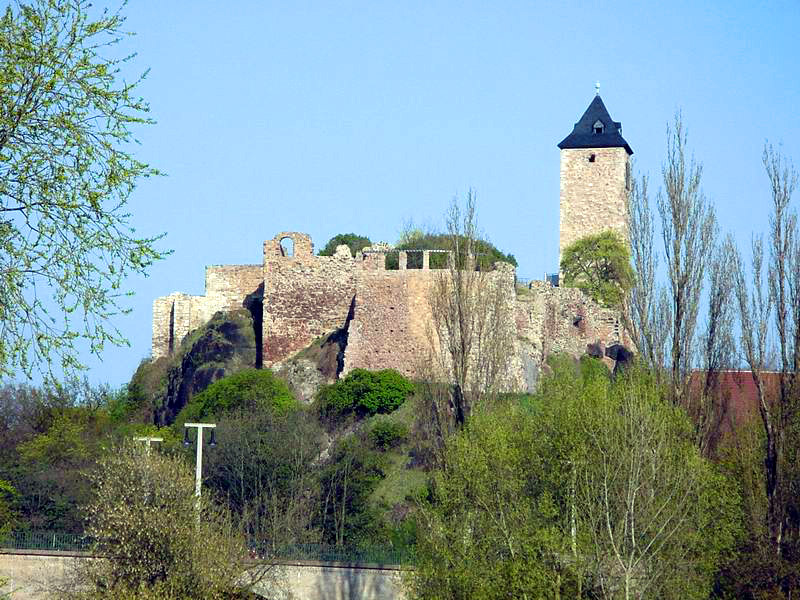
Giebichenstein Castle in Halle (Saale)

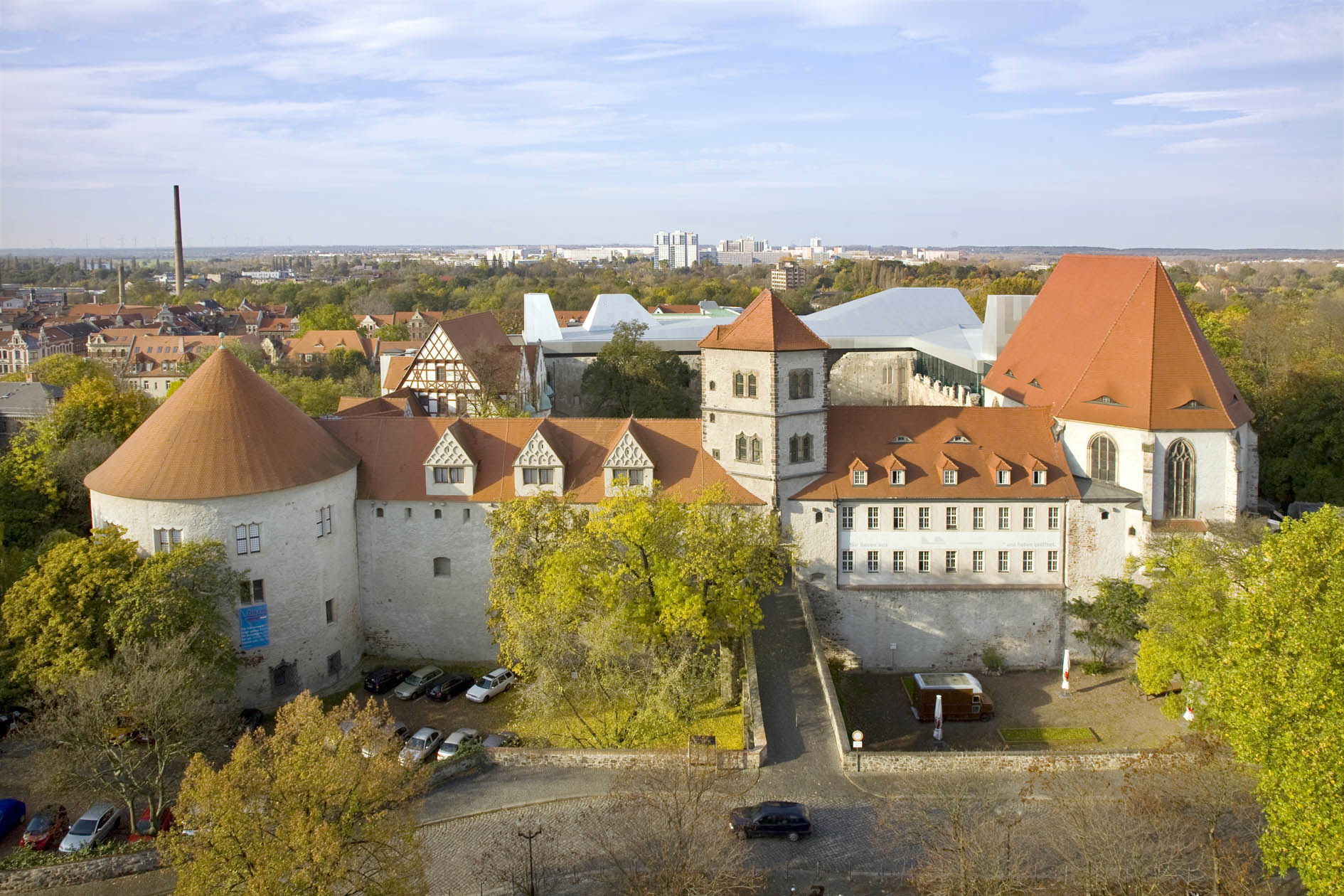
Moritzburg in Halle

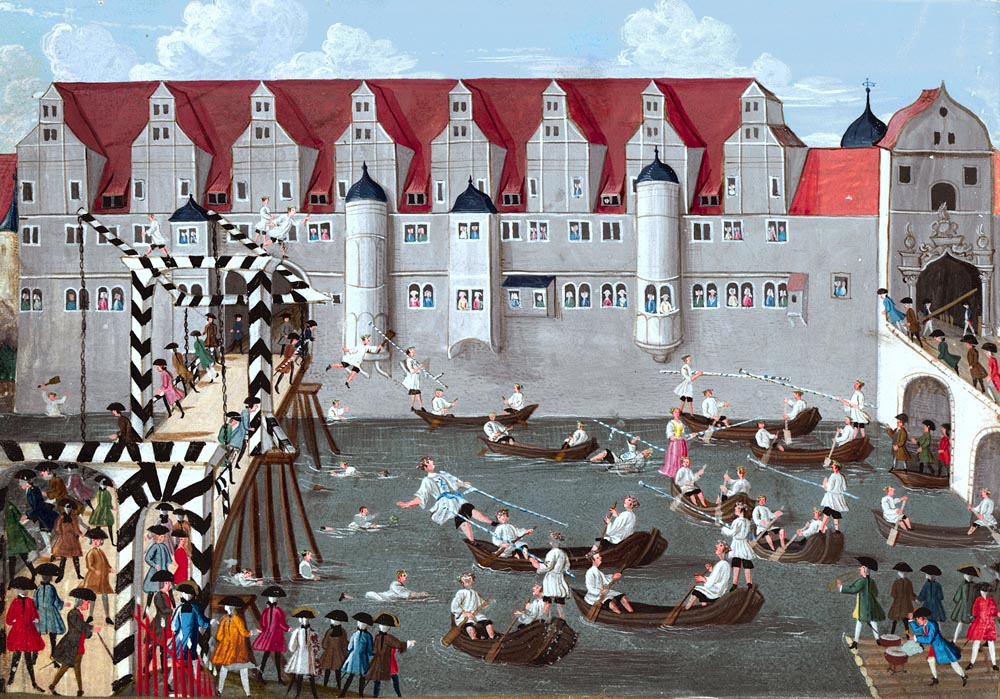
The New Residence in Halle

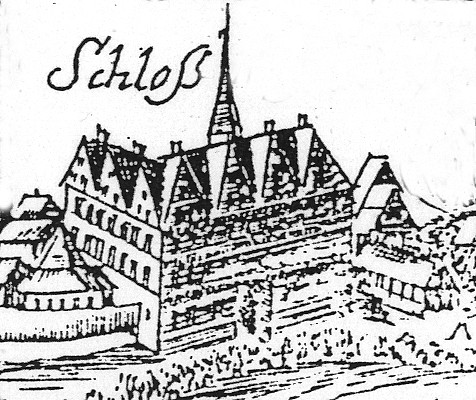
Calbe Castle (secondary residence)

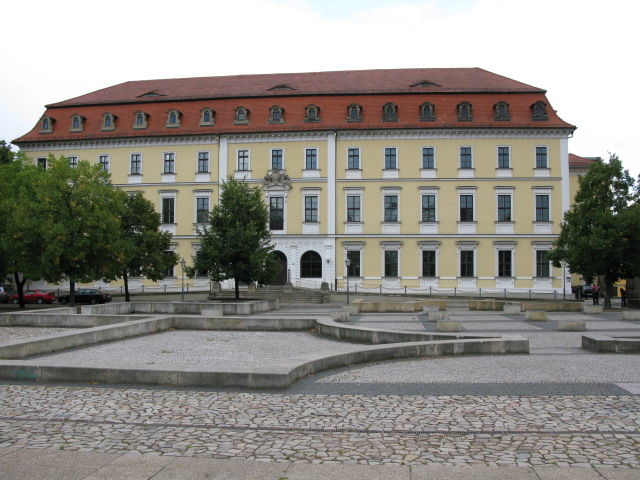
The Archbishop's Palace in Magdeburg

== See also ==
- Bull of Gniezno
