= Treaty of Arnswalde =

1269 treaty between Brandenburg and Pomerelia

The Treaty of Arnswalde (Treaty of Choszczno) was signed on 1 April 1269 between three Brandenburgian margraves, the Ascanians John II, Otto IV and Conrad, and Duke Mestwin II of Pomerelia (Mściwój II) in Arnswalde (then a fortified place in the Brandenburgian New March, now Choszczno, Poland).

With the treaty, Mestwin gave some of his possessions to the margraves, and had them returned as a fief. Excluded from the return was the Białogard (Belgard) area, including Świecie (Schwetz), which remained under direct Brandenburgian rule. In turn the margraves financed the duke, e.g. for the marriage of Mestwin's daughter Catherine with Pribislaw II of Parchim-Richtenberg (part of Mecklenburg).

Through this treaty, Brandenburg gained direct access to the Baltic Sea.

The signing of the treaty provoked a rebellion by the nobility of the region who were opposed to the Brandenburgians. Likewise, Mestwin's brother Warcisław of Gdańsk (Danzig), and his uncle, Sambor II took the opportunity to try and depose Mestwin. However, Warcisław died in 1270 while Sambor was defeated with the help of the Polish duke Bolesław the Pious.

In 1273 Mestwin found himself in open conflict against the margraves who refused to remove their troops from Gdańsk, Mestwin's possession, which he had been forced to temporarily lease to them during his struggles against Warcisław and Sambor. Since the lease had now expired, through this action, the Margrave Conrad broke the treaty and subsequent agreements, in the hopes of capturing as much of Mestwin's Pomeralia as possible. Mestwin, unable to dislodge the Brandenburgian troops himself called in the aid of Bolesław the Pious, whose troops took the city with a direct attack. The war against Brandenburg ended in 1273 with a treaty (possibly signed at Drawno Bridge), in which Brandenburg returned Gdańsk to Mestwin while he rendered feudal homage to the margraves for the Lands of Schlawe and Stolp.

In a subsequent treaty of 1282, the Treaty of Kępno signed with the Polish duke (later, king) Przemysł II, Mestwin transferred the suzerainty over all of Pomeralia and Gdańsk Pomerania, including Słupsk (Stolp) and Sławno (Schlawe) to Poland. Przemysł took control over the area but was murdered by agents of Brandenburg in 1296. The subsequent conflict over the area led to the Teutonic takeover of Danzig in 1308.
