= Gisilher (archbishop of Magdeburg) =

Archbishop of Magdeburg from 981 to 1004

Gisilher, Gisiler or Giseler (died 1004) was the second Archbishop of Magdeburg, succeeding Saint Adalbert, from 981 until his death in 1004.

From 971 to 981, Gisilher was the Bishop of the new see of Merseburg. When he was elevated to the archdiocese in that latter year, however, he suppressed the Merseburg bishopric on the basis that its creation (967 or 968) had not received the written consent of the Diocese of Halberstadt. In 981, the Diocese of Merseburg was united to that of Magdeburg. It was only separated on Gisilher's death. The archbishop had the support of the Bishops of Zeitz and Meissen, who wished to aggrandise their own dioceses.

In 983, the Slavic tribes bordering eastern Saxony rebelled. Havelberg and Brandenburg were destroyed and the March of Zeitz devastated. In August, the margraves of Meissen, Lusatia, and the Nordmark joined with the troops of the Bishop of Halberstadt under the leadership of Gisilher and defeated the Slavs at Belkesheim, near Stendal. Nevertheless, the Germans were once again limited to the land west of the Elbe.

In March 984, Gisilher hosted Henry II, Duke of Bavaria, in Magdeburg on Palm Sunday. He supported Henry for the regency of the young Emperor Otto III and perhaps even as king, for Henry received the commendation of the magnates at Magdeburg.

On his death in 1004, there followed a brief conflict between King Henry II and the cathedral canons before Tagino was installed as archbishop.

== Notes ==
=== Sources ===
- Reuter, Timothy (1991). Germany in the Early Middle Ages 800–1056. Longman History of Germany. New York: Longman. ISBN 9780582490345.
- Thompson, James Westfall (1928). Feudal Germany. Vol. II. New York: Frederick Ungar Publishing.

Gisilher, Gisiler, Giseler, or Giselmar Born: unknown Died: 1004
Catholic Church titles
Preceded by Boso	Bishop of Merseburg; 971–981	Vacant Title next held by Wigbert of Merseburg see defunct, only restored in 1004
Preceded by Adalbert	Archbishop of Magdeburg; 981–1004	Succeeded by Tagino
