= Chorin Abbey =

Former abbey in Brandenburg, Germany

Coordinates: 52°53′34″N 13°53′01″E

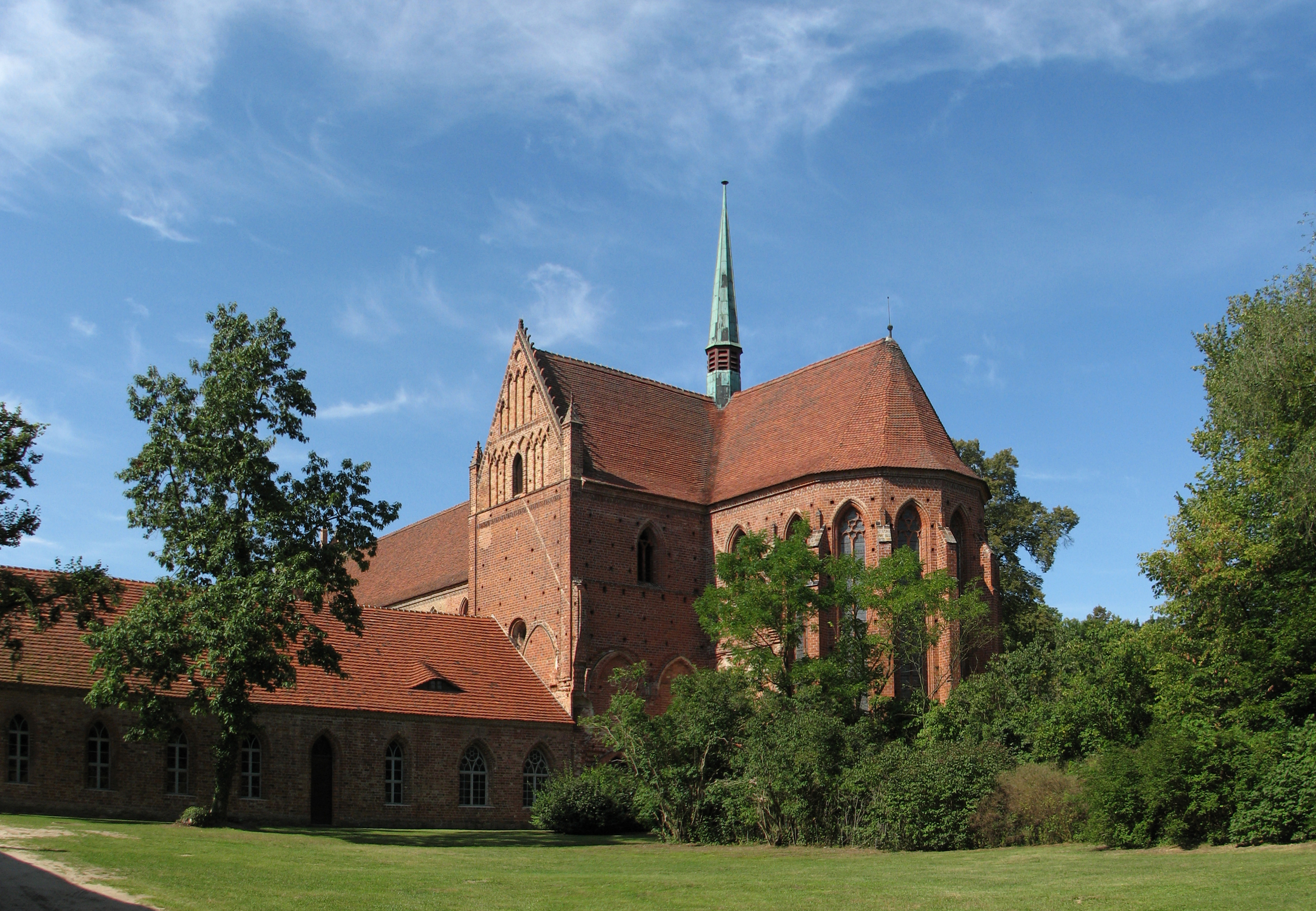
Chorin Abbey

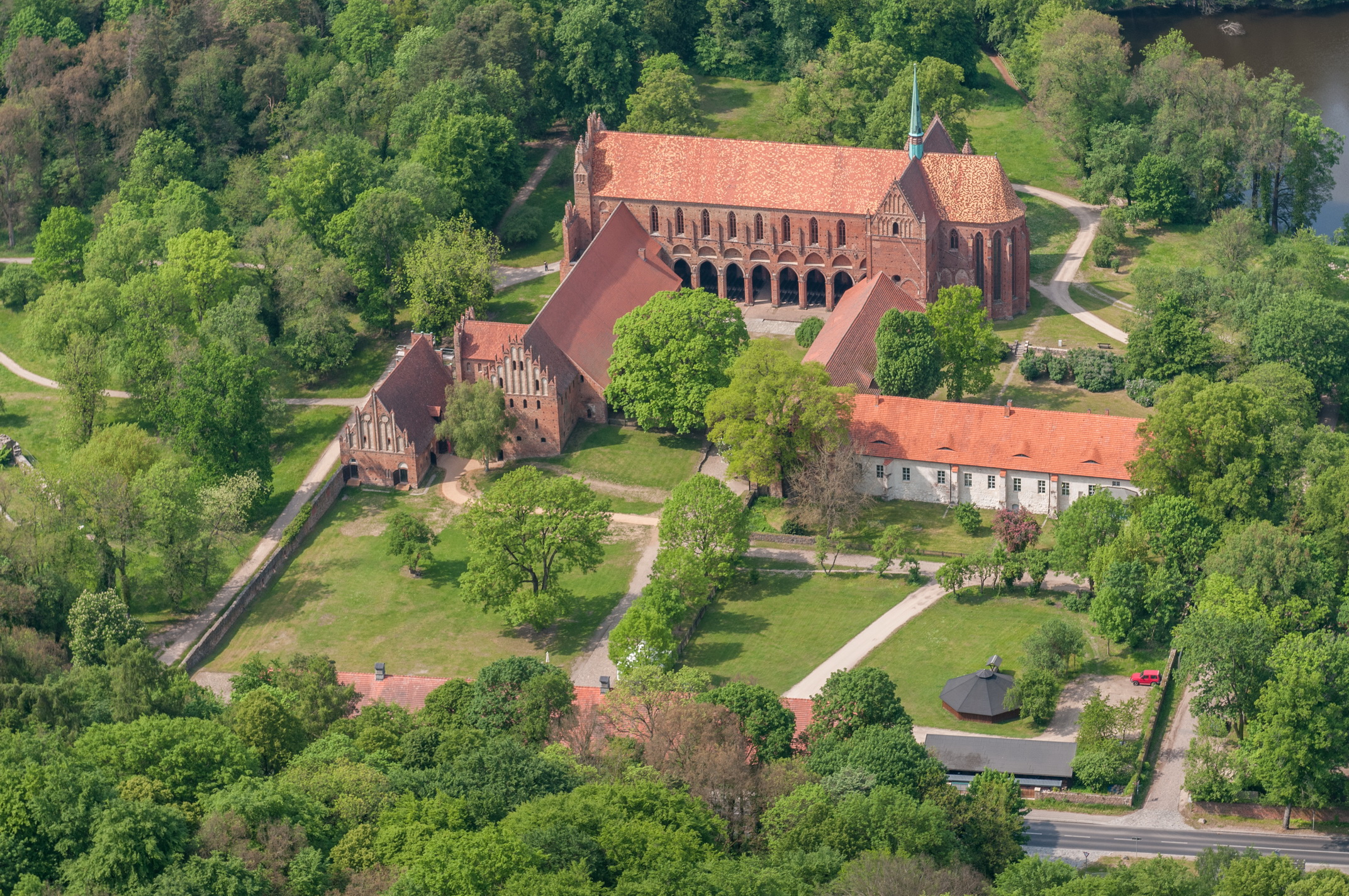
Aerial view

Chorin Abbey (Kloster Chorin) is a former Cistercian abbey near the village of Chorin in Brandenburg, Germany. It was founded by the Ascanian margraves in 1258 and had far-reaching influence on the northern edge of the Ascanians' sphere of influence, where it bordered with the Slavs. It was secularized in 1542 and allowed to decay until the early 19th century, when the ruins were restored and the building partly rebuilt under the direction of Karl Friedrich Schinkel. It is now an archetypal example of the Brick Gothic style and part of the Deutsch-Polnisches Klosternetzwerk.

Some scenes in the 1912 film Das Mirakel were filmed there.
