= Ostmark =

Ostmark may refer to:

- Margraviate of Austria, later known as Ostmark
- Saxon Eastern March, a march of the Holy Roman Empire from the 10th to 12th century
- Ostmark (Austria), Austria's name when it was part of Nazi Germany
- Ostmark, a Gau of the Nazi Party
- East German mark, the currency of the former German Democratic Republic
- German ostmark, short-lived currency used in eastern areas occupied by Germany in 1918

== See also ==
- German Eastern Marches Society
- Army Group Ostmark
