= Gertrude of Hohenberg =

Queen of Germany from 1273 to 1281

- Tomb of Gertrude and her son Charles in Basel

Queen consort of Germany
- Tenure: 1273–1281
- Born: c. 1225; Deilingen, Swabia
- Died: 16 February 1281; Vienna, Austria
- Burial: Saint Paul's Abbey, Lavanttal
- Spouse: Rudolph I of Germany
- Issue Detail: Albert I, King of Germany; Rudolf II, Duke of Austria; Matilda, Duchess of Bavaria; Agnes, Electress of Saxony; Hedwig, Margravine of Brandenburg; Clementia, Queen of Hungary; Judith, Queen of Bohemia
- House: Hohenberg
- Father: Burkhard V, Count of Hohenberg
- Mother: Matilda of Tübingen

Gertrude Anne of Hohenberg (c. 1225 – 16 February 1281) was German queen from 1273 until her death, by her marriage with King Rudolf I of Germany. As queen consort, she became progenitor of the Austrian House of Habsburg.

== Biography ==
Gertrude was born in Deilingen, Swabia to Count Burkhard V of Hohenberg (died 1253) and his wife Matilda (Mechtild), daughter of Count Palatine Rudolf II of Tübingen. The comital Hohenberg dynasty, a cadet branch of the Swabian House of Hohenzollern, then ruled over extended estates in southwestern Germany. Citing contemporary sources, Gertrude's descent was questioned by the Swiss historian Aegidius Tschudi (1505–1572), who postulated a Frohburg lineage; nevertheless, his objections have been disproved.

About 1253/4, Gertrude married Rudolf (1218–1291), son of Count Albert IV of Habsburg and Heilwig of Kyburg. She went on to live with her husband as a comital couple in Rheinfelden. They had eleven children.

Gertrude's husband was elected King of the Romans (as Rudolf I) in Frankfurt on 29 September 1273. The election was largely due to the efforts of her cousin Burgrave Frederick III of Nuremberg. Rudolf was crowned in Aachen Cathedral on 24 October 1273. After the coronation of the noble couple, she called herself Queen Anne. As "Queen Anne" (Anna Regina) she served as his consort for the following eight years. Reluctant to interfere in politics, she witnessed Rudolf's struggles to secure his rule against the rivalling King Ottokar II of Bohemia, as well as his fruitless efforts to be crowned Holy Roman Emperor.

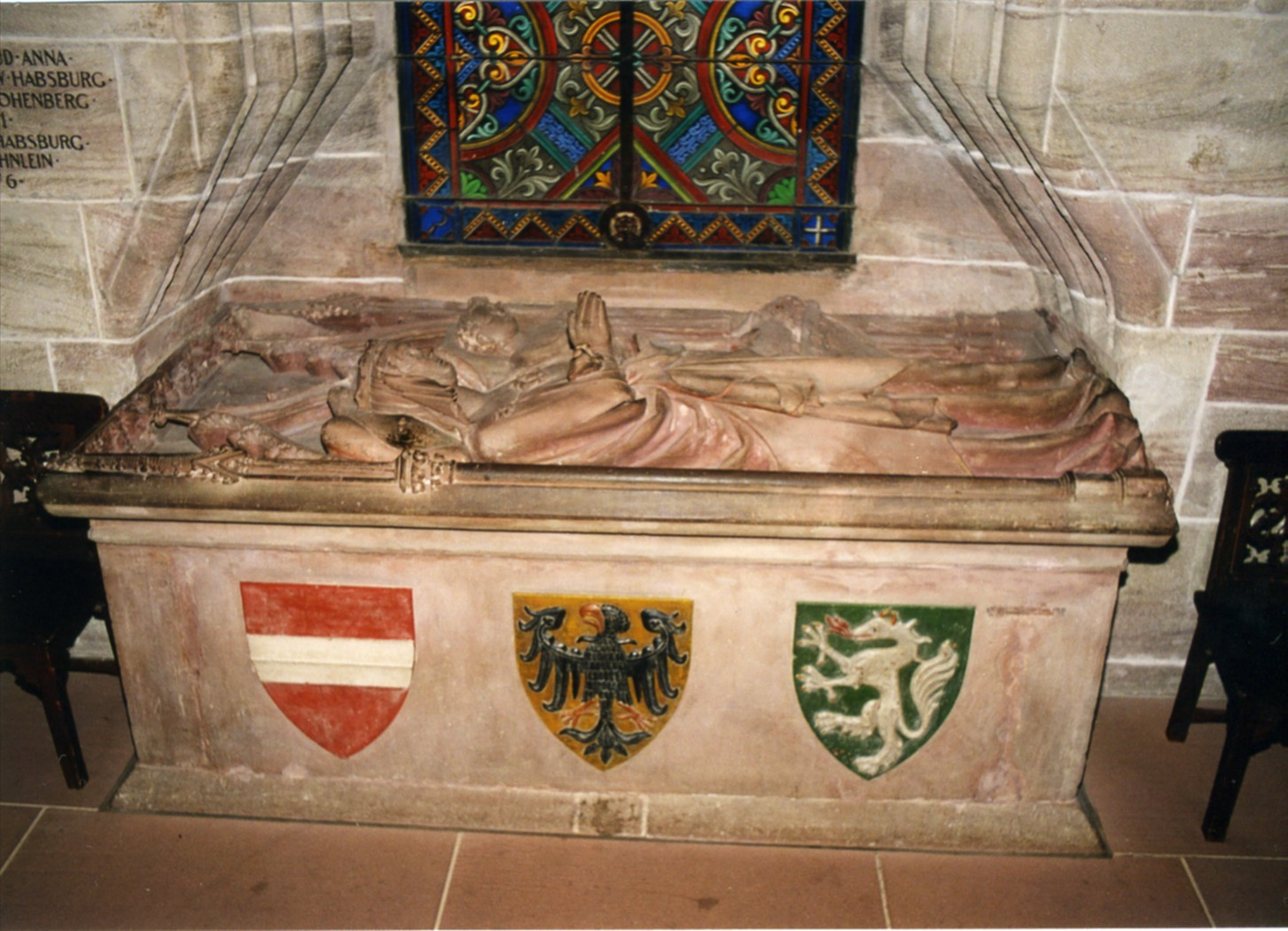
Tomb in Basel Minster

Gertrude died on 16 February 1281 at her husband's residence in Vienna. According to her will, she was buried in Basel Minster, alongside her youngest son Charles. King Rudolf had been engaged in lengthy conflicts with the Prince-Bishops of Basel before his coronation, and Queen Anne wish to be buried in Basel provided him with an opportunity to mend ties with the citizens of Basel. He gave his consent to the funeral in Basel which took place on 20 March. Her entrails were taken out and her body was filled with sand before the burial. Centuries later, her mortal remains were solemnly transferred to Saint Blaise Abbey in 1770; today they rest at Saint Paul's Abbey in Carinthia.

King Rudolf remained a widower for three years and proceeded to marry Isabella of Burgundy.

== Issue ==
1. Matilda (c. 1253, Rheinfelden – 23 December 1304, Munich), married 1273 in Aachen to Louis II, Duke of Bavaria and became mother of Rudolf I, Count Palatine of the Rhine and Louis IV, Holy Roman Emperor.
2. Albert I of Germany (July 1255 – 1 May 1308), Duke of Austria and also of Styria.
3. Catherine (1256 – 4 April 1282, Landshut), married 1279 in Vienna to Otto III, Duke of Bavaria who later (after her death) became the disputed King Bela V of Hungary and left no surviving issue.
4. Agnes [Gertrude] (c. 1257 – 11 October 1322, Wittenberg), married 1282 to Albert II, Duke of Saxony and became the mother of Rudolf I, Duke of Saxe-Wittenberg.
5. Hedwig (c. 1259 – 26 January 1285/27 October 1286), married 1279 in Vienna to Otto VI, Margrave of Brandenburg-Salzwedel and left no issue.
6. Clementia (c. 1262 – after 7 February 1293), married 1281 in Vienna to Charles Martel of Anjou, the Papal claimant to the throne of Hungary and mother of king Charles I of Hungary, as well as of queen Clementia of France, herself the mother of the baby king John I of France.
7. Hartmann (1263, Rheinfelden – 21 December 1281), drowned in Rheinau.
8. Rudolf II, Duke of Austria and Styria (1270 – 10 May 1290, Prague), titular Duke of Swabia, father of John the Patricide of Austria.
9. Judith of Habsburg (Jutte/Bona) (13 March 1271 – 18 June 1297, Prague), married 24 January 1285 to King Wenceslaus II of Bohemia and became the mother of king Wenceslaus III of Bohemia, Poland and Hungary, of queen Anne of Bohemia (1290–1313), duchess of Carinthia, and of queen Elisabeth of Bohemia (1292–1330), countess of Luxembourg.
10. Charles (14 February 1276 – 16 August 1276).

Royal titles
Preceded by Elisabeth of Bavaria	Queen consort of Germany; 29 September 1273 – 16 February 1281	Succeeded by Isabella of Burgundy
