= Treaty of Rheinfelden =

1283 treaty establishing succession for the House of Habsburg

The Treaty of Rheinfelden (German: Rheinfelder Hausordnung) was the first Habsburg order of succession, concluded on 1 June 1283 at the Imperial City of Rheinfelden.

Rudolph of Habsburg had been chosen as King of the Romans in 1273 and had defeated his rival Ottokar II of Bohemia who was killed at the 1278 Battle on the Marchfeld. Ottokar's son Wenceslaus II retained the Bohemian Kingdom, while Ottokar's estates in Austria, Styria, Carinthia and Carniola fell back to the Holy Roman Empire.

King Rudolph had reached an agreement with the prince-electors to award these territories to his sons and, at the Diet of Augsburg in 1282, Albert I and his brother Rudolph II "jointly and severally" received Austria, Styria, Carniola and the Windic March. However, in 1286, Meinhard II of Gorizia-Tyrol became Duke of Carinthia as recompensation for supporting King Rudolph against Ottokar, and also received Carniola and the Windic March as fiefs.

Deviating from these decisions, the Rheinfelden Treaty set down the primogeniture order: then eleven-year-old Duke Rudolph II had to waive all his rights to the thrones of Austria and Styria to the benefit of his elder brother Albert I. According to the terms of the agreement, Rudolf should receive some territories in Further Austria in return but was never compensated until his death in 1290. This fact induced his son John Parricida to murder Albert in 1308.

The adoption of the primogeniture right crucially strengthened the Habsburg influence within the Holy Roman Empire as it allowed the dynasty to constitute a compact allodial territory (Hausmacht) that it could rely on. It nevertheless did not prevent the partition of the Habsburg lands by the 1379 Treaty of Neuberg.

== See also ==
- House of Habsburg
- List of treaties
