= Hedwig of Habsburg =

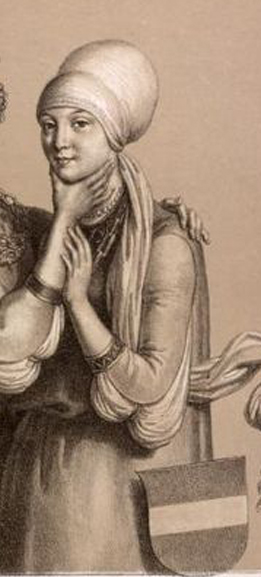

Margravine consort of Brandenburg
- Tenure: 1279–1285/1286
- Born: c. 1260; Rheinfelden, Swabia
- Died: 1285/1286
- Burial: Lehnin Abbey
- Spouse: Otto VI, Margrave of Brandenburg-Salzwedel
- House: House of Habsburg
- Father: Rudolf I of Germany
- Mother: Gertrude of Hohenberg

Hedwig (or Heilwig; c. 1260 – 1285/1286), a member of the royal House of Habsburg, was Margravine of Brandenburg from 1279 until her death, by her marriage with the Ascanian margrave Otto VI of Brandenburg-Salzwedel.

Hedwig was born in Rheinfelden, Swabia, the seventh of nine children of Count Rudolf IV of Habsburg and his first wife, Gertrude of Hohenberg. It is unknown when Hedwig was born, but it was probably between 1258 and 1261 from the evidence of the births of her two closest siblings. The Habsburgs did not play much of a role in history until the time of Hedwig's father, Count Rudolf, was elected king of Germany in 1273, whereafter the family rose to one of the most powerful ruling dynasties in the Holy Roman Empire.

After the 1278 Battle on the Marchfeld, King Rudolf wished to make peace with the Bohemian kings, and to do this he needed to marry at least one of his daughters into the royal Přemyslid dynasty. Hedwig's younger sister Judith was married to King Wenceslaus II of Bohemia, son of the late King Ottokar II, and Hedwig herself was married to Margrave Otto VI (called "the Small") of Brandenburg, whose elder brother Otto V ("the Tall") acted as King Wenceslaus' guardian. Hedwig and Otto VI were married in 1279 at the Habsburg residence in Vienna, Austria.

Hedwig and Otto may have had a child who died young. In 1285 or 1286, her husband renounced all claims to the Margraviate of Brandenburg in favour of his brother and joined the Knights Templar. Hedwig died the same year; she was buried at the Cistercian abbey of Lehnin.
