= Beatrice of Bohemia =

- Born: 1225
- Died: 1290 (aged 64–65)
- Noble family: Přemyslid
- Spouse: Otto III, Margrave of Brandenburg
- Issue: John III, Margrave of Brandenburg-Salzwedel; Otto V, Margrave of Brandenburg-Salzwedel; Albert III, Margrave of Brandenburg-Salzwedel; Otto VI, Margrave of Brandenburg-Salzwedel; Kunigunde; Matilda of Brandenburg, Duchess of Pomerania
- Father: Wenceslaus I of Bohemia
- Mother: Kunigunde of Hohenstaufen

Beatrice of Bohemia (Czech: Božena Česká; 1225–1290) was a daughter of King Wenceslaus I of Bohemia and his wife Kunigunde of Hohenstaufen.

She married Margrave Otto III and was the mother of:

- John III "of Prague" (1244-1268)
- Otto V "the Tall" (c. 1246-1298)
- Albert III (c. 1250-1300)
- Otto VI "the Short" (c. 1255-1303)
- Kunigunde (died c. 1292), married:

in 1264 to Duke Bela of Slavonia (1245-1269)
in 1273 to Duke Waleran IV of Limburg

- Matilda (d. 1316), married in 1266 to Duke Barnim I of Pomerania (c. 1218-1278)

== Ancestry ==
Ancestors of Beatrice of Bohemia

16. Vladislaus I of Bohemia
8. Vladislaus II of Bohemia
17. Richeza of Berg
4. Ottokar I of Bohemia
18. Louis I, Landgrave of Thuringia
9. Judith of Thuringia
19. Hedwig of Gudensberg
2. Wenceslaus I of Bohemia
20. Géza II of Hungary
10. Béla III of Hungary
21. Euphrosyne of Kiev
5. Constance of Hungary
22. Raynald of Châtillon
11. Agnes of Antioch
23. Constance of Antioch
1. Beatrice of Bohemia
24. Frederick II, Duke of Swabia
12. Frederick I, Holy Roman Emperor
25. Judith of Bavaria
6. Philip, King of the Romans
26. Renaud III, Count of Burgundy
13. Beatrice I, Countess of Burgundy
27. Agatha of Lorraine
3. Kunigunde of Hohenstaufen
28. Andronikos Dukas Angelos
14. Isaac II Angelos
29. Euphrosyne Kastamonitissa
7. Irene Angelina
30. George Komnenodoukas Palaiologos; (1125–1168)
15. Unknown Palaiologina?, afterwards Irene
31. ?Irene Komnene Kantakouzene?
