= Isabella of Burgundy, Queen of Germany =

Queen of Germany from 1284 to 1291

Isabella of Burgundy
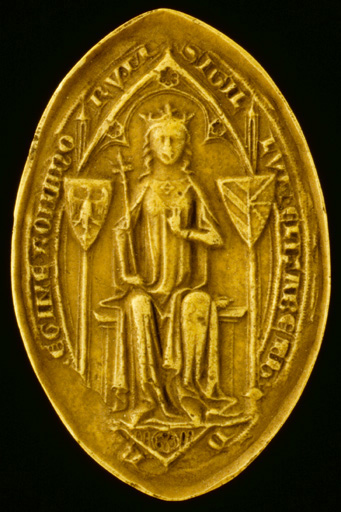
- Seal of Isabella as Queen

Queen consort of Germany
- Tenure: 1284–1291
- Born: 1270
- Died: August 1323 (aged 52–53)
- Spouse: Rudolf I of Germany
- House: House of Burgundy
- Father: Hugh IV, Duke of Burgundy
- Mother: Beatrice of Navarre

Isabella of Burgundy (1270 – August 1323), Lady of Vieux-Château, was the second and last Queen consort of Rudolf I of Germany.

She was the second daughter of Hugh IV, Duke of Burgundy and his second wife Beatrice of Navarre.

Isabella was betrothed in 1272 to Charles of Flanders. He was born in 1266 to Robert III, Count of Flanders and his first wife Blanche of Sicily. He died in 1277.

On 6 February 1284, Isabella became the second wife of Rudolf I of Germany. The bride was fourteen years old and the groom almost sixty-six. Their marriage remained childless. Rudolph died on 15 July 1291. He was succeeded as Duke of Austria by his co-ruling sons Albert I and Rudolph II.

She returned to the Court of Burgundy and was granted the title of Lady of Vieux-Château on 20 November 1294.

== Sources ==
- Morvan, Frederic (2009). La Chevalerie bretonne et la formation de l'armee ducale, 1260-1341 (in French). Presses Universitaires de Rennes. ISBN 978-2-7535-0827-9.

Royal titles
| Preceded by Gertrude of Hohenberg | German Queen; 6 February 1284 – 15 July 1291 | Succeeded by Imagina of Isenburg-Limburg |
