= John III of Brandenburg-Salzwedel =

13th Century Margrave of Brandenburg-Salzwedel

John III, Margrave of Brandenburg-Salzwedel
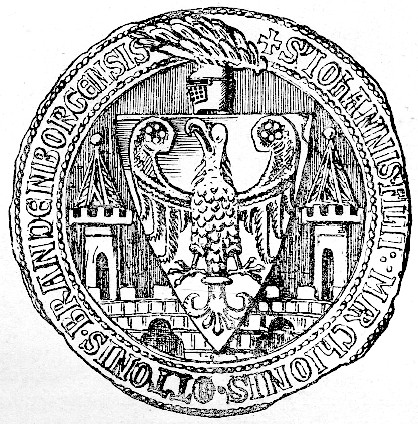
- The seal of John III
- Born: 1244; Prague
- Died: 1268 (aged 23–24)
- Noble family: House of Ascania
- Father: Otto III, Margrave of Brandenburg
- Mother: Beatrice of Bohemia

John III, Margrave of Brandenburg-Salzwedel, nicknamed John from Prague (1244 in Prague – 1268) was the eldest son of Margrave Otto III and his wife, Beatrice of Bohemia.

After his father died in 1267, he ruled the Margraviate of Brandenburg jointly with his brother Otto V and his cousins Otto IV and Henry I until he died sometime the following year.

John died during a tournament in 1268. He was unmarried and childless.

John III of Brandenburg-Salzwedel House of Ascania Born: 1244 Died: 1268
Preceded by Otto III	Margrave of Brandenburg; 1267-1268; With: Otto V, Otto IV and Henry I	Succeeded by Otto V, Otto IV and Henry I
