= Otto III of Brandenburg =

Margrave of Brandenburg from 1220 to 1267

Otto III
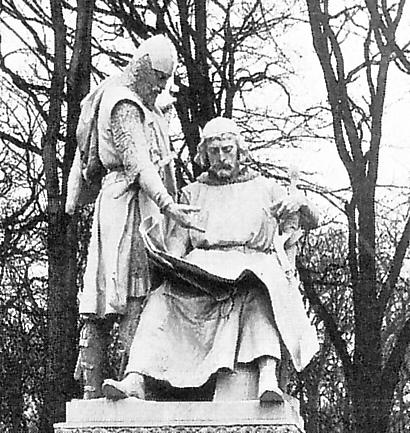
- Monument to John I (sitting) and his brother Otto III in the Siegesallee in Berlin, by Max Baumbach.

Margrave of Brandenburg
- Reign: 1220–1267
- Predecessor: Albert II
- Successor: Otto IV
- Born: 1215
- Died: 9 October 1267; Brandenburg an der Havel
- Burial: Church of the Dominican monastery in Strausberg
- Spouse: Beatrice of Bohemia
- Issue: John III, Margrave of Brandenburg-Salzwedel; Otto V, Margrave of Brandenburg-Salzwedel; Albert III, Margrave of Brandenburg-Salzwedel; Otto VI, Margrave of Brandenburg-Salzwedel; Kunigunde, Duchess of Slavonia and Limburg; Matilda, Duchess of Pomerania
- House: House of Ascania
- Father: Albert II, Margrave of Brandenburg
- Mother: Matilda of Lusatia

Otto III, nicknamed the pious (1215 – 9 October 1267 in Brandenburg an der Havel) was Margrave of Brandenburg jointly with his elder brother John I until John died in 1266. Otto III then ruled alone, until his death, the following year.

The reign of these two Ascanian margraves was characterized by an expansion of the margraviate, which annexed the remaining parts of Teltow and Barnim, the Uckermark, the Lordship of Stargard, the Lubusz Land and parts of the Neumark east of the Oder. They consolidated the position of Brandenburg within the Holy Roman Empire, which was reflected in the fact that in 1256, Otto III was a candidate to be elected King of the Germans. They founded several cities and developed the twin cities of Cölln and Berlin. They expanded the Ascanian castle in nearby Spandau and made it their preferred residence.

Before their death, they divided the margraviate in a Johannine and an Ottonian part. The Ascanians were traditionally buried in the Lehnin Abbey in the Ottonian part of the country. In 1258, they founded a Cistercian monastery named Mariensee, where members of the Johannine line could be buried. In 1266, they changed their mind and founded a second monastery, named Chorin, 8 km southwest of Mariensee. John was initially buried at Mariensee; his body was moved to Chorin in 1273.

After the Ottonian line died out in 1317, John I's grandson Waldemar reunited the margraviate.

== Life ==
=== Regency and guardianship ===
Otto was the younger son of Albert II of the Brandenburg line of the House of Ascania and Mechthild (Matilda) of Lusatia, daughter of Count Conrad II of Lusatia, a junior line of the House of Wettin. Since both Otto and his two-year older brother John I were minors when their father died in 1220, Emperor Frederick II transferred the regency to Archbishop Albert I of Magdeburg. The guardianship was taken up by the children's first cousin once removed, Count Henry I of Anhalt, the older brother of Duke Albert I of Saxony, a cousin of Albert II. As the sons of Duke Bernard III of Saxony, they were the closest relatives, and Henry had the older rights.

In 1221, their mother, Countess Matilda, purchased the regency from the Archbishop of Magdeburg for 1900 silver Marks and then ruled jointly with Hernry I. The Archbishop of Magdeburg then traveled to Italy, to visit Emperor Frederick II and Duke Albert I of Saxony attempted to grab power in Brandenburg, causing a rift with his brother Henry I. The Saxon attack presented an opportunity for Count Palatine Henry V to get involved. Emperor Frederick II managed to prevent a feud, urging them to keep the peace.

After Matilda died in 1225, the brothers ruled the Margraviate of Brandenburg jointly. John I was about twelve years old at the time, and Otto III was ten. They were knighted on 11 May 1231 in Brandenburg an der Havel and this is generally taken as the beginning of their reign.

=== Domestic policies ===
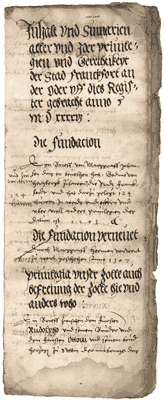
Deed of John I, raising Frankfurt an der Oder (Vrankenvorde) to city status in 1253

After the death of Count Henry of Brunswick-Lüneburg in 1227, the brothers supported his nephew, their brother-in-law Otto the Child, who was only able to prevail against Hohenstaufen claims and its vassals by force of arms. In 1229, there was a feud with former regent Archbishop Albert, which ended peacefully. Like their former opponents and defenders, they appeared at the Diet of Mainz in 1235, where the Public Peace of Mainz was proclaimed.

After the dispute over the kingship between Conrad IV and Henry Raspe the brothers recognized William II of Holland as king in 1251. They first exercised Brandenburg's electoral privilege in 1257, when they voted for king Alfonso X of Castile. Although Alfonso was not elected, the fact that they were able to vote illustrates the growing importance of Brandenburg, which had been founded only a century earlier, in 1157, by Albert the Bear. When John and Otto came to power, Brandenburg was considered an insignificant little principality on the eastern border. By the 1230s, the Margraves of Brandenburg had definitely gained the heritable post of Imperial Chamberlain and the indisputable right to vote in the election of the King of the Germans.

=== Developing the country ===
John I and his brother Otto III developed the territory of their margraviate and expanded market towns and castles, including Spandau, Cölln and Prenzlau into towns and centers of commerce. They also expanded Frankfurt an der Oder and John I awarded it city status in 1253.

==== The Teltow War and the Treaty of Landin ====
Between 1230 and 1245, Brandenburg acquired the remaining part of Barnim and the southern Uckermark up to the Welse river. On 20 June 1236, the Margraviate acquired the Lordships of Stargard, Beseritz and Wustrow by the Treaty of Kremmen from Duke Wartislaw III of Pomerania. Later that year, the brothers initiated the construction of Stargard Castle, to secure the northernmost part of their territory.

From 1239 to 1245, the brothers fought the Teltow War against the Margraves of Meissen of the House of Wettin. At stake was a Slavic castle at Köpenick, a former headquarters of the Sprewanen tribe, located at the confluence of the Spree and Dahme rivers, at the time, it was just east of Berlin; today it's part of the city. It dominated the Barnim and Teltow areas. In 1245, the brothers managed to take both castle a Köpenick and a fortress at Mittenwalde. From this base, they could expand further to the east. In 1249, they acquired the Lubusz Land and reached the river Oder.

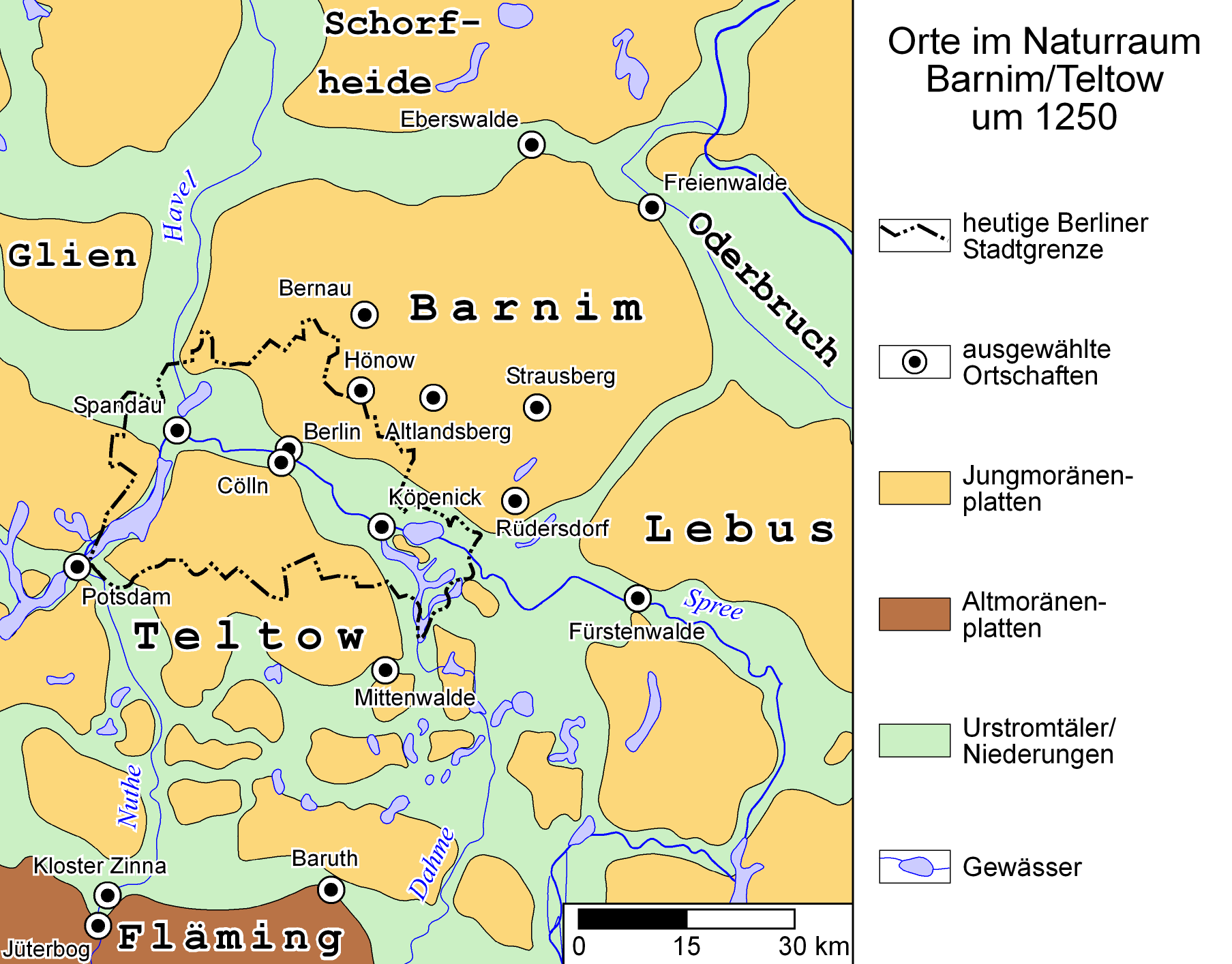
Towns on the Teltow and Barnim plateaus, around 1250

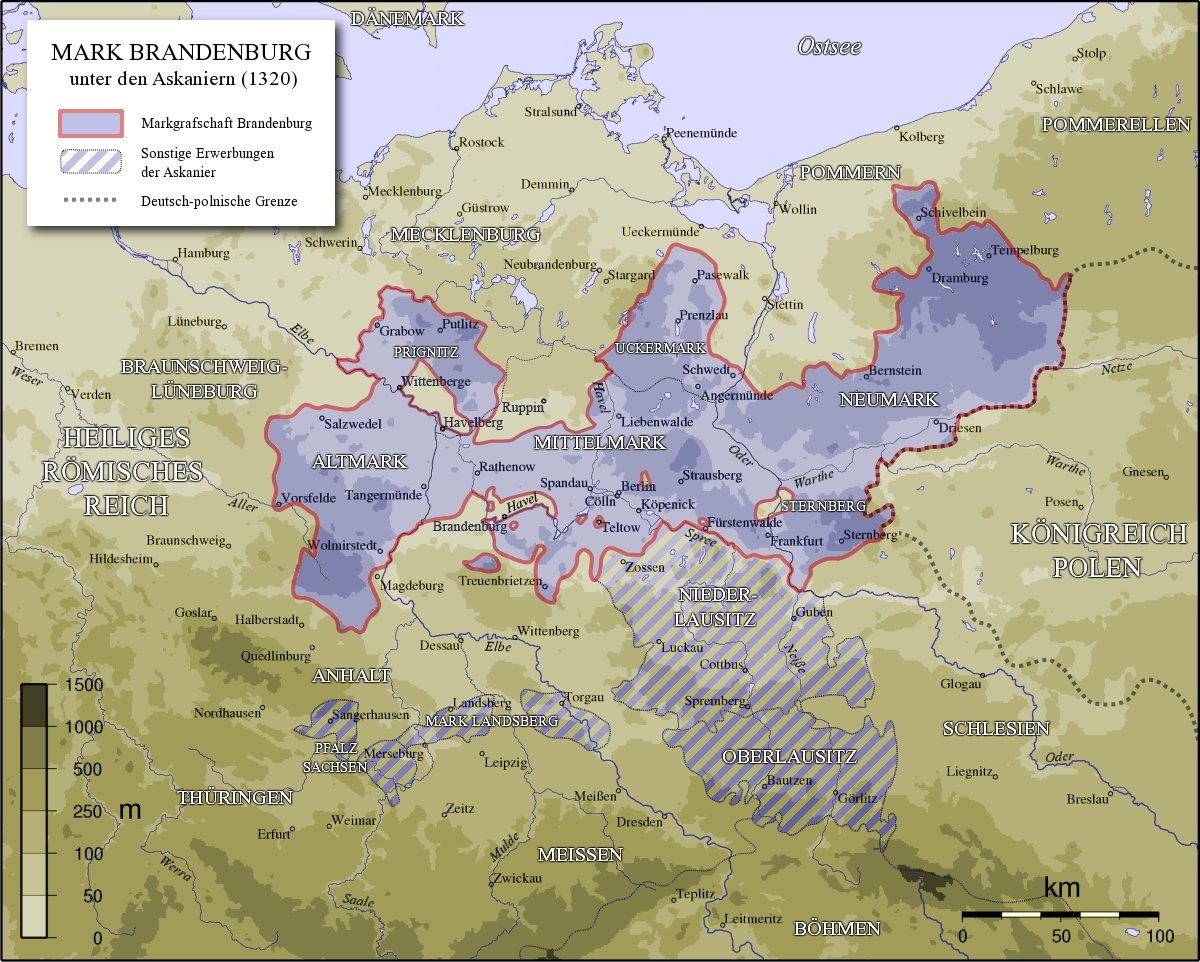
The Ascanian Margraviate of Brandenburg, around 1320

In 1250, the brothers closed the Treaty of Landin with the Dukes of Pomerania. Under this treaty, they received the northern part of the Uckermark (terra uckra), north of the Welse river and the districts of Randow and Löcknitz, in exchange for the half of the Lordship of Wolgast that John I had received as dowry from King Waldemar II of Denmark when he married his first wife, Sophia. This treaty is considered the birth of the Uckermark as a part of Brandenburg.

Otto joined King Ottokar II of Bohemia in 1255 in the Prussian Crusade, and helped establish Königsberg.

==== Policies to stabilize the Neumark ====
During the first third of the 13th century German settlers were recruited by Duke Leszek I the White to settle the Neumark. After he died in 1227, the Polish central government collapsed, allowing the Margraves of Brandenburg to expand eastwards. They acquired land east of the Oder and expanded their domain further east to the river Drawa and north to the river Persante. In 1257, John I founded the town of Landsberg (now called Gorzów Wielkopolski) as an alternative river crossing across the Warta, competing with the crossing in the Polish town of Santok, detracting from the considerable revenues Santok made from foreign trade (custom duties, fees from the market operation and storage fees), similar to the way Berlin had been founded to compete with Köpenick. In 1261, the Margraves purchased Myślibórz (German: Soldin) from the Knights Templar and began developing the town to their power center in the Neumark.

To stabilize their new possessions, the Margraves used the tried and tested Ascanian policy of founding monasteries and settlements. As early as 1230, they supported the Polish Count Dionysius Bronisius when he founded the Cistercian Paradies Monastery near Międzyrzecz (Meseritz) as a filiation of the monastery at Lehnin. Their cooperation with the Polish count provided border security against Pomerania and prepared the economy of the area for integration into the Neumark. Among the settlers in the Neumark was the von Sydow family, who were later ennobled. the small town of Cedynia (Zehden; today in the Polish Voivodeship of West Pomerania) was enfeoffed to the noble von Jagow family.

The historian Stefan Warnatsch has summarized this development and the attempts of the Ascanians to gain access to the Baltic Sea from the middle Oder and the Uckermark as follows: The great success of the territorial expansion in the 13th century was largely due to the great-grandsons of Albert the Bear [...]. The design of their reign reached much further spatially and conceptually then that of their predecessors. According to Lutz Partenheimer: [around 1250], the Ascanians had pushed back their competitors from Magdeburg, Wettin, Mecklenburg, Pomerania, Poland and the smaller competitors on all fronts. However, John I and Otto III failed to produce the strategically important connection to the Baltic Sea.

=== Development in the Berlin area ===
The development of the Berlin area is closely related to the other policies of the two Margraves. The two founding cities of Berlin (Cölln and Berlin) were founded relatively late. The settlements began around 1170 and achieved city status around 1240. Other settlement in the area, such as Spandau and Köpenick, date back to the Slavic period (from about 720) and these naturally had a greater strategic and political importance than the young merchant towns Cölln and Berlin. For a long time the border between the territories of the Slavic tribes Hevelli and Sprewanen crossed straight through the area of today's Berlin. Around 1130, Spandau was an eastern outpost of the Hevelli under Pribislav. When Pribilav died in 1150, Spandau fell to Brandenburg under the terms of an inheritance treaty between Pribislav and Albert the Bear. Brandenburg did not acquire Köpenick until 1245.

==== Residence at Spandau ====
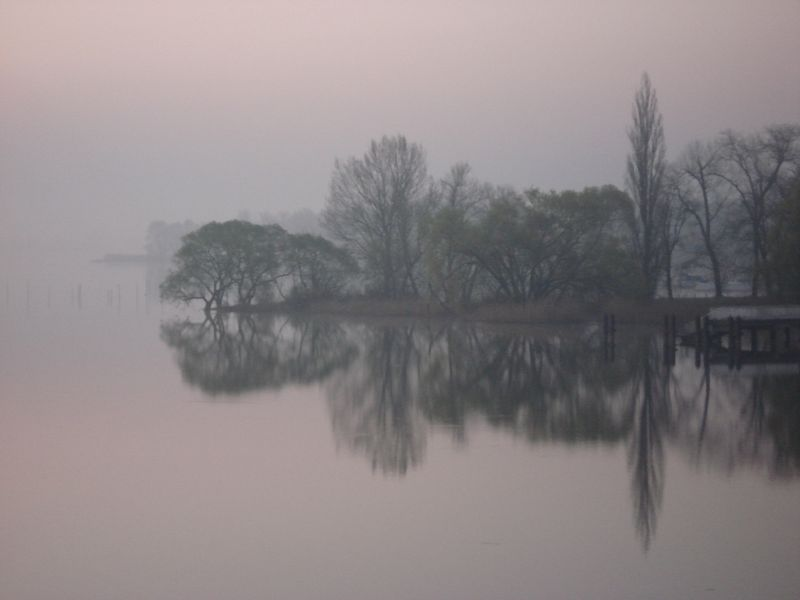
Plauer See, the scene of a battle against Magdeburg in 1229

In 1229, the Margraves of Brandenburg lost a battle against their former guardian, the archbishop of Magdeburg at the Plauer See, close to their residence in Brandenburg an der Havel. They escaped to the fortress at Spandau. In the following years, the brothers made Spandau their preferred residence, next to Tangermünde in the Altmark. Between 1232 and 1266, seventeen stays at Spandau have been documented, more than at any other town.

Albert the Bear probably expanded the fortress island at Spandau eastwards before or shortly after his victory against a certain Jaxa (this was probably Jaxa of Köpenick) in 1157. Towards the end of the 12th century, the Ascanians moved the fortress about a kilometer to the North, to the location of today's Spandau Citadel, probably because of a rising ground water table. The presence of an Ascanian fortress on this site in 1197 has been established. John I and Otto III expanded the fortress and promoted the civitas in the adjacent settlement. They gave it city rights in 1232 or earlier. They founded the Benedictine nunnery of St. Mary in 1239. The Nonnendammallee, one of the oldest streets in Berlin and as Nonnendamm part of a trade route as early as the 13th century, is still a reminder of the former nunnery

==== Expansion of Cölln and Berlin ====
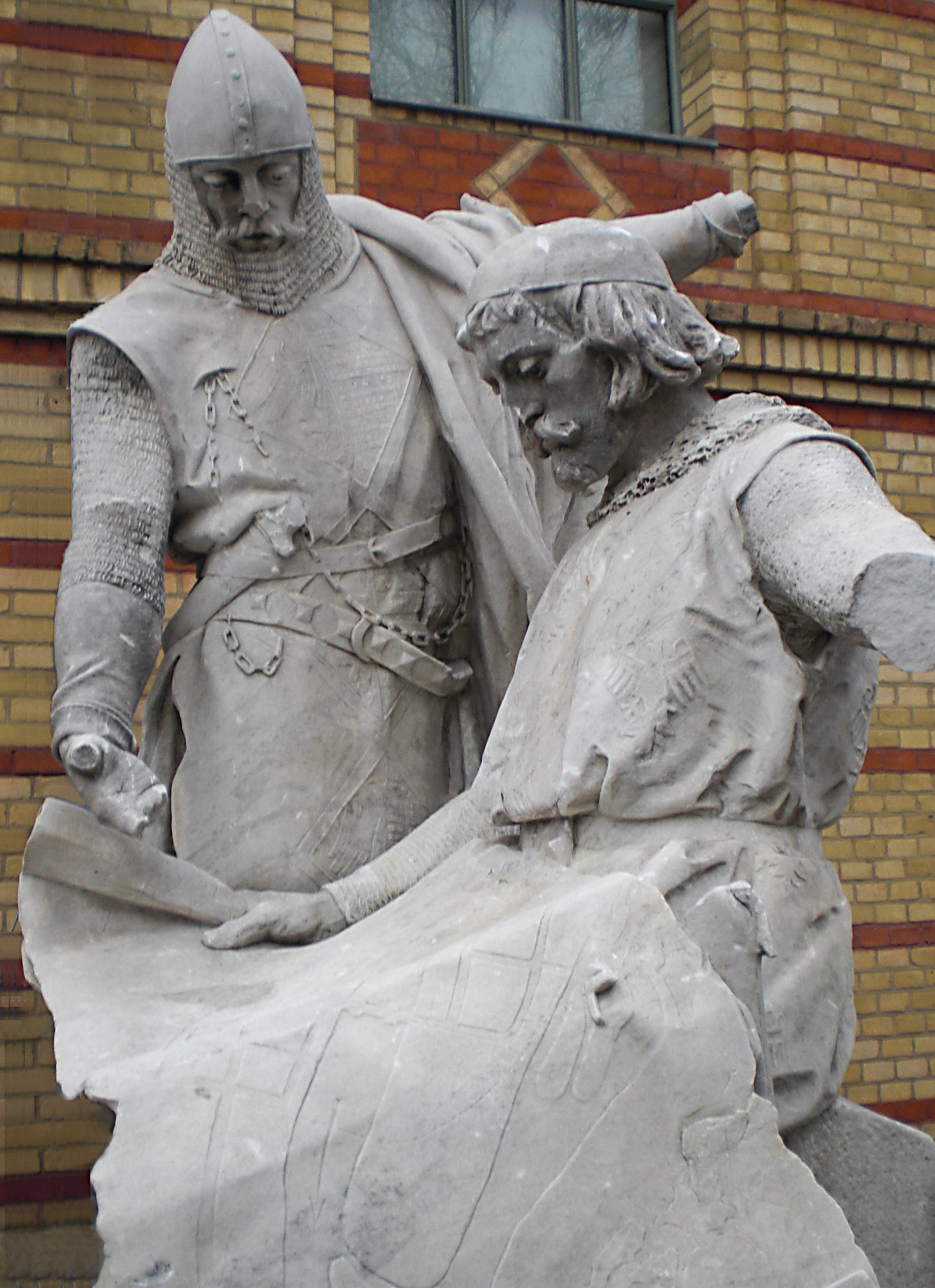
John I (sitting) and Otto III studying the (alleged) city charter of Berlin and Cölln (now in the Spandau Citadel).

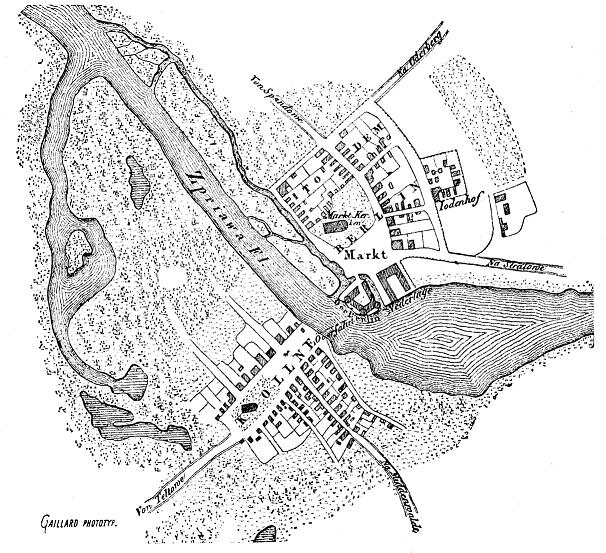
Berlin and Cölln around 1230

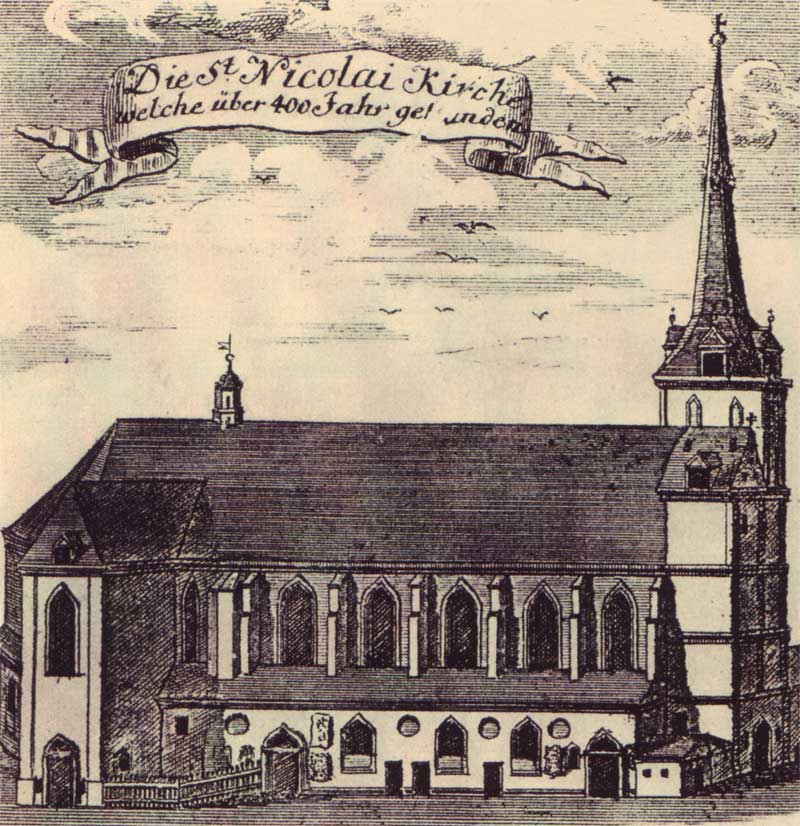
St. Nicholas Church in Berlin, founded around 1220/1230, picture from 1740

According to the current state of research, no evidence has been found that a Slavic settlement existed in the area around the twin towns of Berlin and Cölln. The ford across the largely swampy Berlin Glacial Valley gained importance during the Slavic-German transition period, when John I and Otto III settled the sparsely populated plateaus of Teltow and Barnim with local Slavs and German immigrants.

According to Adriaan von Müller, the strategic importance of Cölln and Berlin, and the reason for the foundation was probably to form a counterweight to Köpenick, a secure trading hub held by the Wettin (dynasty)s with its own trade routes to the north and east. The broad ford across two or even three river arms away could best be protected by fortified settlements on both river banks. The Margraves protected the route to Halle across the northwestern Teltow plateau by a chain of Templar villages: Marienfelde, Mariendorf, Rixdorf and Tempelhof. After the Ascanians defeated the Wettins in the Teltow War of 1245, the importance of Köpenick decreased, took an increasingly central position in the developing trading network.

According to Winfried Schich, we can assume the Berlin and Cölln owe their development as urban settlements to the structural changes in this area due to the expansion during the High Middle Ages, which led both to a denser population and a reorganization of long-distance trade routes. [...] The diluvial plateaus of Teltow and Barnim with their heavy and relatively fertile soils, were systematically settled and put under the plow during the reign of Margraves John I and Otto III. During the first phase of settlement, the lowland areas along the river with their lighter soils seem to have been the preferred places of settlement.

According to the Chronica Marchionum Brandenburgensium of 1280, Berlin and other places were built (exstruxerunt) by John I and Otto III. Since their reign had started in 1225, the period around 1230 is considered the founding period of Berlin. Recent archaeological research has uncovered evidence of late 12th century market towns in both Cölln and Berlin. Ninety graves were excavated in the St. Nicholas Church, the oldest building in Berlin, with foundations dated 1220-1230 and some of these graves could also be from the late 12th century. This implies that the two Margraves did not actually found the cities of Cölln and Berlin, although they did play a decisive role in the early expansion of the cities.

Among the privileges granted to the two cities by the Margraves were Brandenburg Law (including absence of tolls, free exercise of trade and commerce, hereditary property rights) and in particular the staple right, which gave Cölln and Berlin an economic advantage of Spandau and Köpenick. The Margraves gave the Mirica, the Cölln Moor, with all usage rights to the citizens of Cölln. The connection of the Margraves with Berlin is also evidenced by their choice of Hermann von Langele as their confessor. This Hermann von Langele was the first known member of the Franciscan convent at Berlin. He is mentioned as a witness in a deed issued by the Margrave in Spandau in 1257.

=== Otto's death ===
Otto III died on 9 October 1267 at his residence in Brandenburg an der Havel. Although the traditional Ascanian grave site at Lehnin Abbey was situated in his half of the Margraviate, he preferred to be buried in the church of the Dominican monastery in Strausberg he had founded in 1252. The Ascanians had neglected Lehnin Abbey with regards to gifts and donations since the regency of their mother, who was probably not very close to the Abbey on the Zauche plateau.

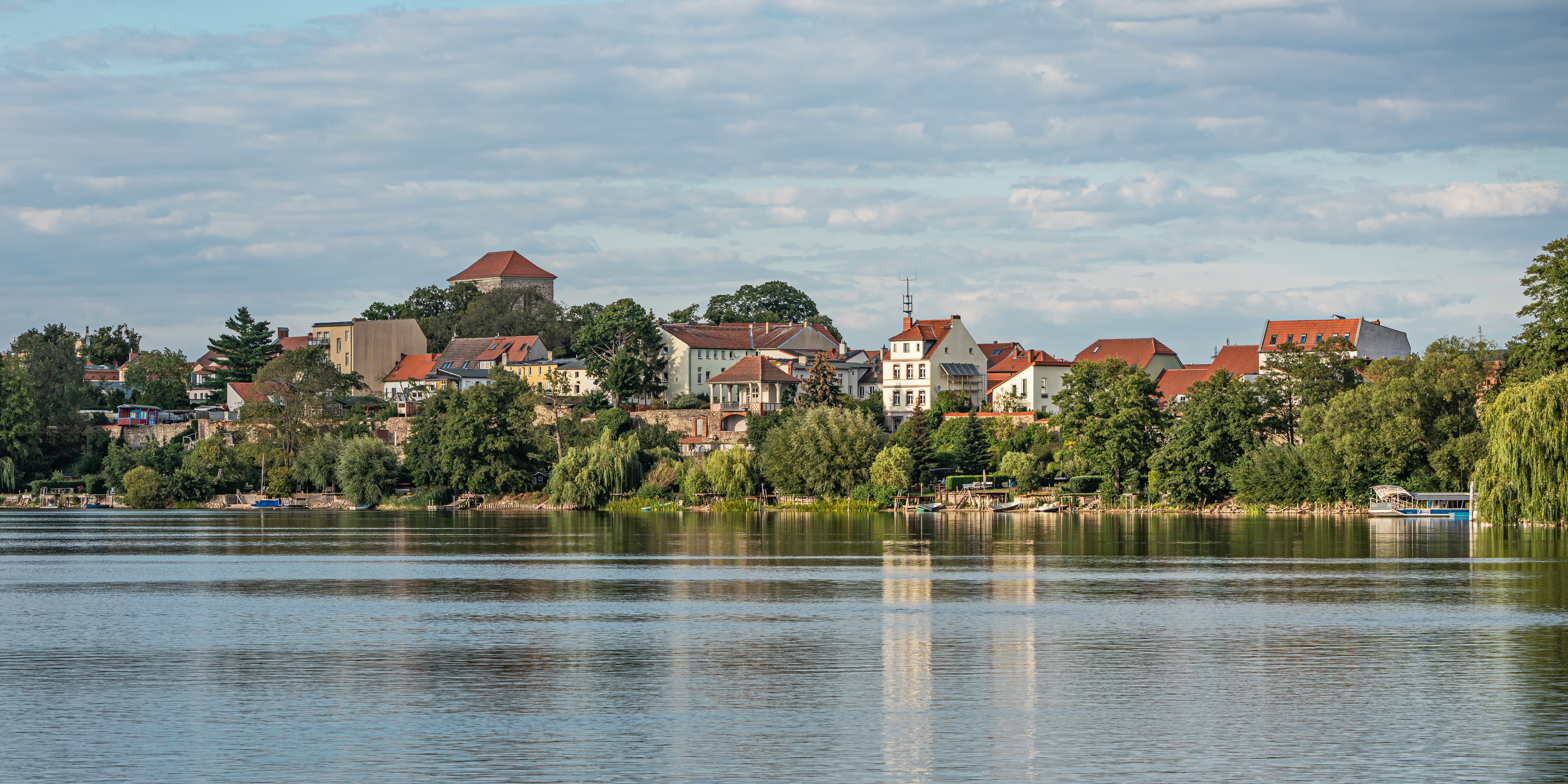
The town where Otto III was buried: Strausberg, at the banks of lake Straussee

The historian Otto Tschirch writes about Otto's death: [...] Otto III's preferred residence, apart from the castle on the cathedral island, appears to have been the margrave's court in the New Town (i.e. west of the river) in Brandenburg an der Havel, on the spot where later the St. Pauli Monastery was built. He met his death here, a few months after his older brother John, who died in the second half of 1266. After he had attended Sunday mass, he died in the presence of numerous Dominican friars. for whom he had a special fondness. This is why the court was later donated to the Dominican Order, who built a monastery on this spot. His wife, Beatrice of Bohemia, and his two older sons, John III and Otto V, brought his body to Strausberg, where he was buried in the choir of the Dominican church he had founded, according to his solemn last wishes

== Inheritance and descendants ==
The joint rule of the Margraves ended in 1258 with a division of their territory. A cleverly managed division and continued consensual policy prevented the Margraviate from falling apart. The preparations for the reorganization may have begun in 1250, when the Uckermark was acquired, but no later than 1255, when John I married Jutta (Brigitte), the daughter of Duke Albert I of Saxony-Wittenberg.

=== Johannine and Ottonian line ===
==== Chorin Abbey - Grave laying and power politics ====
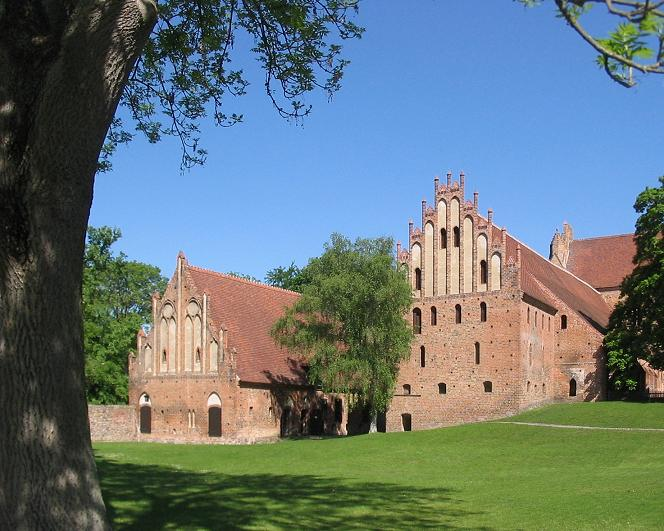
Chorin Abbey, burial place of John I

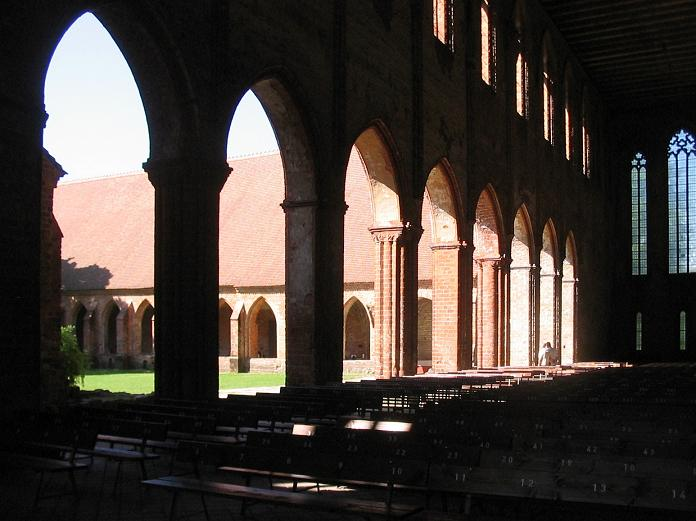
Chorin Abbey church

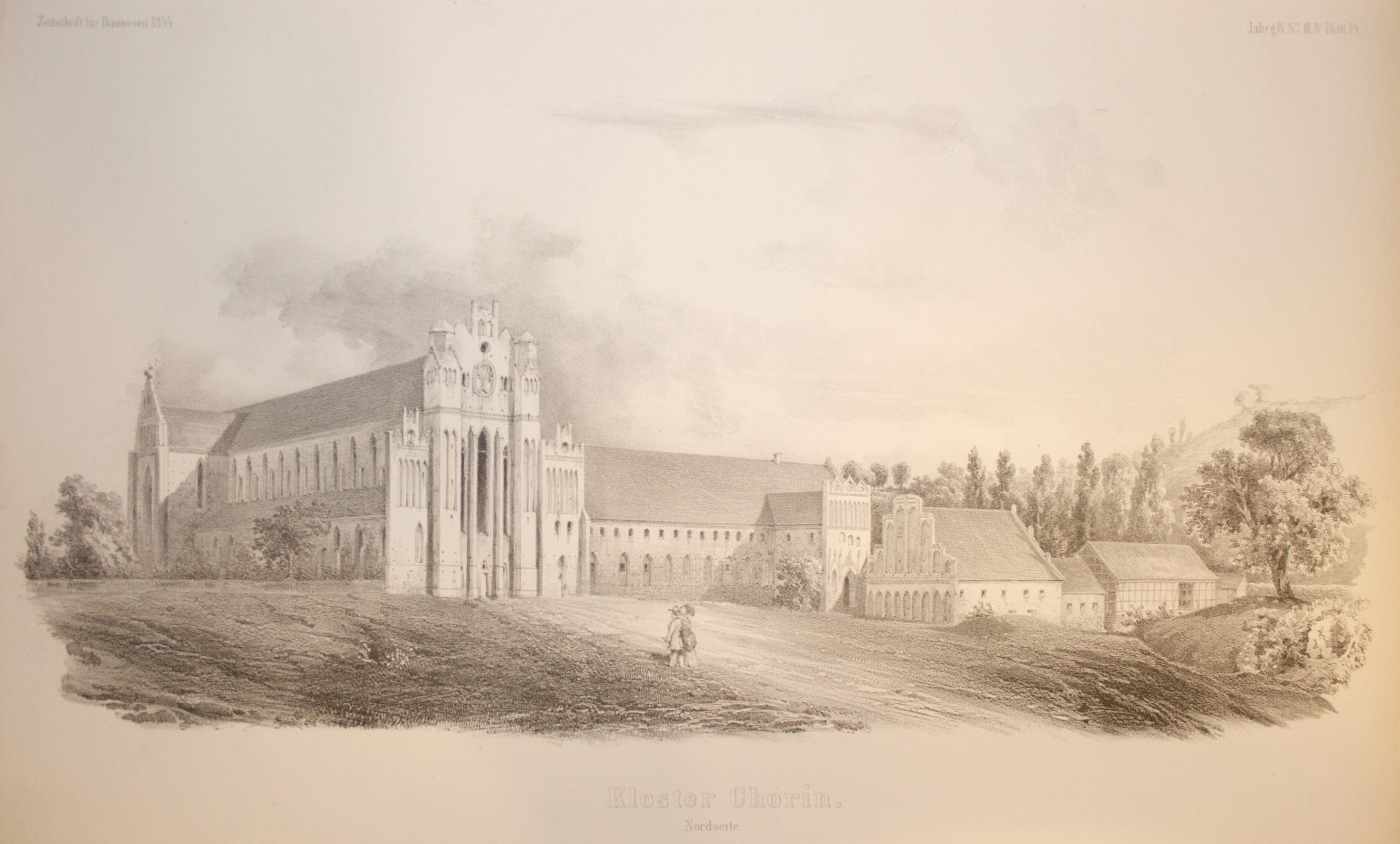
Chorin Abbey, founded by John I and Otto III, north side, 1854

The politics of marriage and 1258 consummated division of the state government led to the joint foundation of the monastery of Mariensee on a former island in the Parsteiner See lake on the northeastern edge of today's Barnim. Until then, deceased Margraves of Brandenburg had been buried at Lehnin Abbey, in the Ottonian part of the Margraviate. The monastery of Mariensee was meant to provide the Johannine line with a burial place of their own. Construction of the monastery began in 1258 with monks from Lehnin. Even before Mariensee was completed in 1273, a decision was made to move to a new location approximately five miles to the southwest with the new name Chorin Abbey. When John I died in 1266, he was initially buried at Mariensee. In 1273, his body was moved to Chorin Abbey. It appears that in 1266, John I arranged for the monastery to move and that he donated rich gifts to the new Chorin Abbey, including the village of Parstein. His sons later confirmed these donations for the benefit of their father's soul and their own.

As with all monasteries founded by the Ascanians, political and economic considerations played an important rôle, alongside the pastoral aspects. A Slavic circular rampart existed on the island, to the west of the monastery. John I and Otto III probably used this rampart as a castle against their Pomeranian competitors. The monastery was meant to provide central and administrative functions. "Both the foundation itself and the location in a regional centre 'across' the trade route [...] in a populated area are to be interpreted as the result of political calculations".

==== Dividing the Margraviate ====
When the Margraviate was divided, John I received Stendal and the Altmark, which was considered the "cradle" of Brandenburg, and would remain a part until 1806. He also received the Havelland and the Uckermark. His brother Otto III received Spandau, Salzwedel, Barnim, the Lubusz Land and Stargard. The most important factors in this division were revenue and the number of vassals; geographical factors played only a subordinate rôle. Their successors as Margraves of Brandenburg, Otto IV "with the Arrow", Waldemar "the Great" and Henry II "the Child" all stem from the Johannine line. Otto's sons and grandsons and John's younger sons also styled themselves "Margrave of Brandenburg" and as such co-signed official document — for example, John's sons John II and Conrad so-signed in 1273 the decision to move Mariensee monastery to Chorin — however, they remained "co-regents".

The Ottonian line died out in 1317 with the death of Margrave John V in Spandau, so that Brandenburg was reunited under Waldemar the Great. The Johannine line died out only three years later, with the death of Henry the Child in 1320, ending Ascanian rule in Brandenburg. In 1290, nineteen Margraves of the two lines had gathered on a hill near Rathenow; in 1318 only two Margraves were left alive: Waldemar and Henry the Child. The last Ascanian in Brandenburg, the eleven-year-old Henry the Child, only played a minor rôle and was already at the mercy of the various houses trying to grab power in the upcoming power vacuum.

=== Marriage and issue ===
In 1244, Otto III married Beatrix (Božena), a daughter of King Wenceslaus I of Bohemia. Upper Lusatia came to Brandenburg via this marriage. They had the following children:

- John III "of Prague" (1244–1268)
- Otto V "the Tall" (c. 1246-1298)
- Albert III (c. 1250-1300)
- Otto VI "the Short" (c. 1255-1303)
- Kunigunde (died c. 1292), married:

in 1264 to Béla, Duke of Slavonia (1245-1269)
in 1273 to Waleran IV, Duke of Limburg

- Matilda (d. 1316), married in 1266 to Duke Barnim I of Pomerania (c. 1218-1278)

According to some historians his daughter was Agnes (Agnieszka), who was engaged in 1278 to Bolko I of Opole. Other historians rejected this hypothesis.

== Double statue of the brothers at the Siegesallee ==
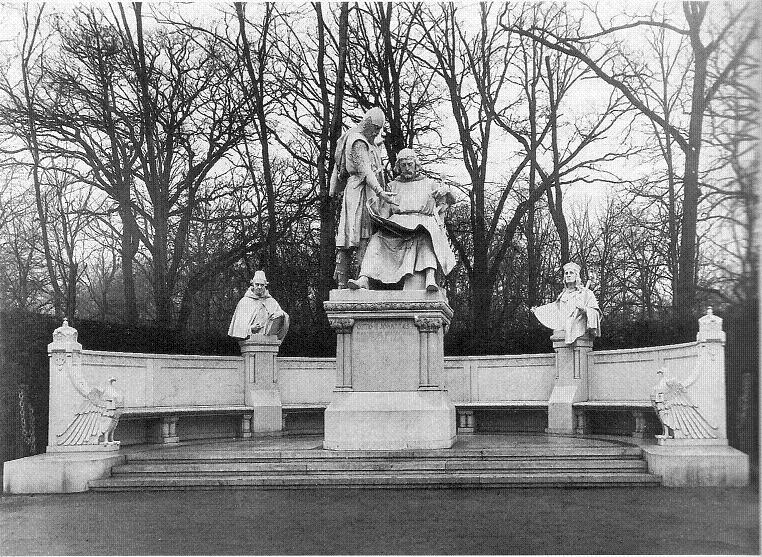
Siegesallee in Berlin with double statue for the Margraves John I and Otto III. The left side figure is the priest Simeon from Cölln, the figure on the right is Marsilius de Berlin. Sculptor: Max Baumbach, unveiled in 1900

The double statue depicted on the left stood in the Siegesallee in the Großer Tiergarten in Berlin. The Siegesallee was a grand boulevard commissioned by Emperor Wilhelm II in 1895 with statues illustrating the history of Brandenburg and Prussia. Between 1895 and 1901, 27 sculptors led by Reinhold Begas created 32 statues of Prussian and Brandenburg rulers, each 2.75 high. Each statue was flanked by two smaller busts representing people who had played an important rôle in the life of the historic ruler.

The central statue in group 5 was the double statue of John and Otto. On the left was a bust of provost Simeon of Cölln, who was a witness, on 28 October 1237, together with bishop Gernand of Brandenburg, of the oldest deed in which Cölln is mentioned. On the right was a bust of Marsilius de Berlin, the first recorded mayor (Schultheiß) of Berlin. He was simultaneously mayor of Cölln.

The choice of the secular and ecclesiastical leaders of Berlin and Cölln as flanking characters for John and Otto underscores the pivotal rôle the city of Berlin played in the lives of the Margraves in the opinion of Reinhold Koser, the historian who did the research for the Siegesallee. Koser regarded the founding and development of the city as the Margrave's most important policy, more so than the expansion the principality and the founding of the monastery. he was also impressed by the consensus which characterised their joint rule, as presented in the Chronicle of 1280. According to Koser, the sculptor Max Baumbach was responsible for the decision to make the founding of Berlin the central theme of the double statue, rather than the expansion or the founding of the monastery.

John I depicted sitting on a stone, with the city charter of Berlin and Cölln spread across his knees. The younger Otto III stand beside him, pointing to the deed with one hand, while his other arm rests on a spear. The outstretched arms and bowed head suggest the brothers' protection and promotion of the twin cities. The fact that the two young men are depicted as mature men was seen by Koser as legitimized by the right of artistic freedom. Two adolescents would not have been able to adequately express the founding of a future world city, from the perspective of the late 19th century interpretation of history.

The overall architecture of the statue group maintains a romanticistic style. According to Uta Lehnert, the two eagles show characteristics of the Jugendstil.

== Ancestry ==
Ancestors of Otto III of Brandenburg

16. Otto, Count of Ballenstedt
8. Albert the Bear
17. Eilika of Saxony
4. Otto I, Margrave of Brandenburg
18. Herman I, Count of Winzenburg
9. Sophie of Winzenburg
19. A Countess of Everstein
2. Albert II, Margrave of Brandenburg
20. Dirk VI, Count of Holland
10. Floris III, Count of Holland
21. Sophia of Rheineck
5. Ada of Holland
22. Henry of Scotland
11. Ada of Huntingdon
23. Ada de Warenne
1. Otto III, Margrave of Brandenburg
24. Conrad I, Margrave of Meissen
12. Dedi III, Margrave of Lusatia
25. Luitgard of Ravenstein
6. Conrad II, Margrave of Lusatia
26. Goswin II of Valkenburg-Heinsberg
13. Matilda of Heinsberg
27. Adelaide of Sommerschenburg
3. Matilda of Groitzsch
28. Bolesław III Wrymouth
14. Mieszko III the Old
29. Salomea of Berg
7. Elisabeth of Poland
30. Béla II of Hungary
15. Elisabeth of Hungary
31. Helena of Raška

== Footnotes ==
Otto III of Brandenburg House of Ascania Born: 1215 Died: 9 October 1267
Preceded by Albert II	Margrave of Brandenburg; 1220–1267; With: John I	Succeeded by Otto IV
