= Matilda of Brandenburg, Duchess of Pomerania =

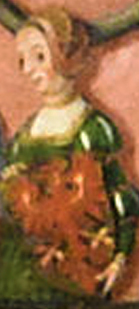
Matilda of Brandenburg, Duchess of Pomerania

Matilda of Brandenburg (died 1316), was a Duchess consort of Pomerania by marriage to Barnim I, Duke of Pomerania. She was the daughter of Otto III, Margrave of Brandenburg and his wife, Beatrice of Bohemia.

She was the regent of Pomerania during the minority of her sons Barnim II, Duke of Pomerania and Otto I, Duke of Pomerania between 1277 and 1294, in co-regency with her stepson Bogislaw IV, Duke of Pomerania.

She had five children:

- Miroslawa (b. ca. 1270 – d. between 23 December 1327 and 11 November 1328), married in 1285 to Niklot I, Count of Schwerin.
- Beatrix (d. 1315 or 1316), married bef. 1290 to Henry II, Lord of Werle in Penzlin, son of Henry I of Werle.
- Matilda (d. young, 1295).
- Barnim II (b. 1277 – d. 28 May 1295).
- Otto I (b. posthumously, 1279 – d. 30 or 31 December 1344).
