= Treaty of Landin =

1250 treaty between Pomerania-Stettin and Brandenburg

The Treaty of Landin was signed in Landin, Germany in 1250 between Barnim I of Pomerania-Stettin, the Ascanian margraves Johann I and Otto III of Brandenburg. Barnim I was accepted as co-ruler of Wartislaw III of Pomerania-Demmin by the Margraviate of Brandenburg, thereby hindering Brandenburg's succession in Pomerania-Demmin as was ruled out in the 1236 Treaty of Kremmen. Instead of the margraves, Barnim I integrated what was left of Pomerania-Demmin, after the territorial losses of 1236 into his Stettin-based duchy. The terra Wolgast within the Duchy of Pomerania, which was to be inherited by the Margraves, was exchanged for Pomeranian-held northern parts of the Uckermark. Barnim also accepted to be a Brandenburgian vassal.
