= Agnes of Bohemia, Duchess of Austria =

Duchess of Austria (1269–1296)

Agnes of Bohemia
- Duchess of Austria
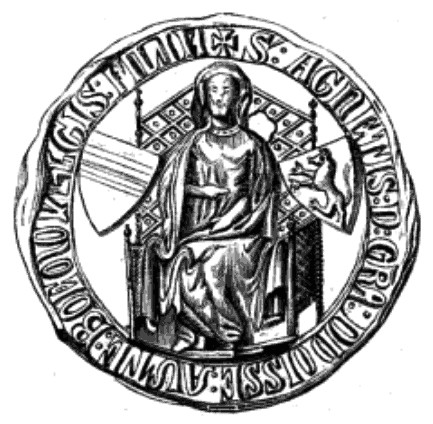
- A seal of Agnes
- Born: 5 September 1269
- Died: 17 May 1296 (aged 26); Convent of Saint Agnes, Old Town, Prague
- Burial: St. Salvator Church, Prague
- Spouse: Rudolf II, Duke of Austria (m. 1289; died 1290)
- Issue: John Parricida
- Dynasty: Přemyslid
- Father: Ottokar II of Bohemia
- Mother: Kunigunda of Halych

Agnes of Bohemia (5 September 1269 – 17 May 1296) was a Bohemian princess, Countess of Habsburg, and Duchess of Austria.

== Biography ==
Agnes was born on 5 September 1269 to Ottokar II of Bohemia and Kunigunda of Halych. Her marriage contract to Rudolf II, Duke of Austria was agreed upon in 1278, but they only married in 1289. He died just a year later, leaving Agnes widowed at 21. After his death, she gave birth to their only child, John Parricida. Following her husband's death, she moved to Schloss Prugg, where she lived until 1295. After that, she moved to Convent of Saint Agnes to be a nun. She died there on 17 May 1296. She was buried in St. Salvator Church, Prague, except for her heart, which was interred in a Cistercian monastery founded by her father in Zbraslav.
