= Barnim I =

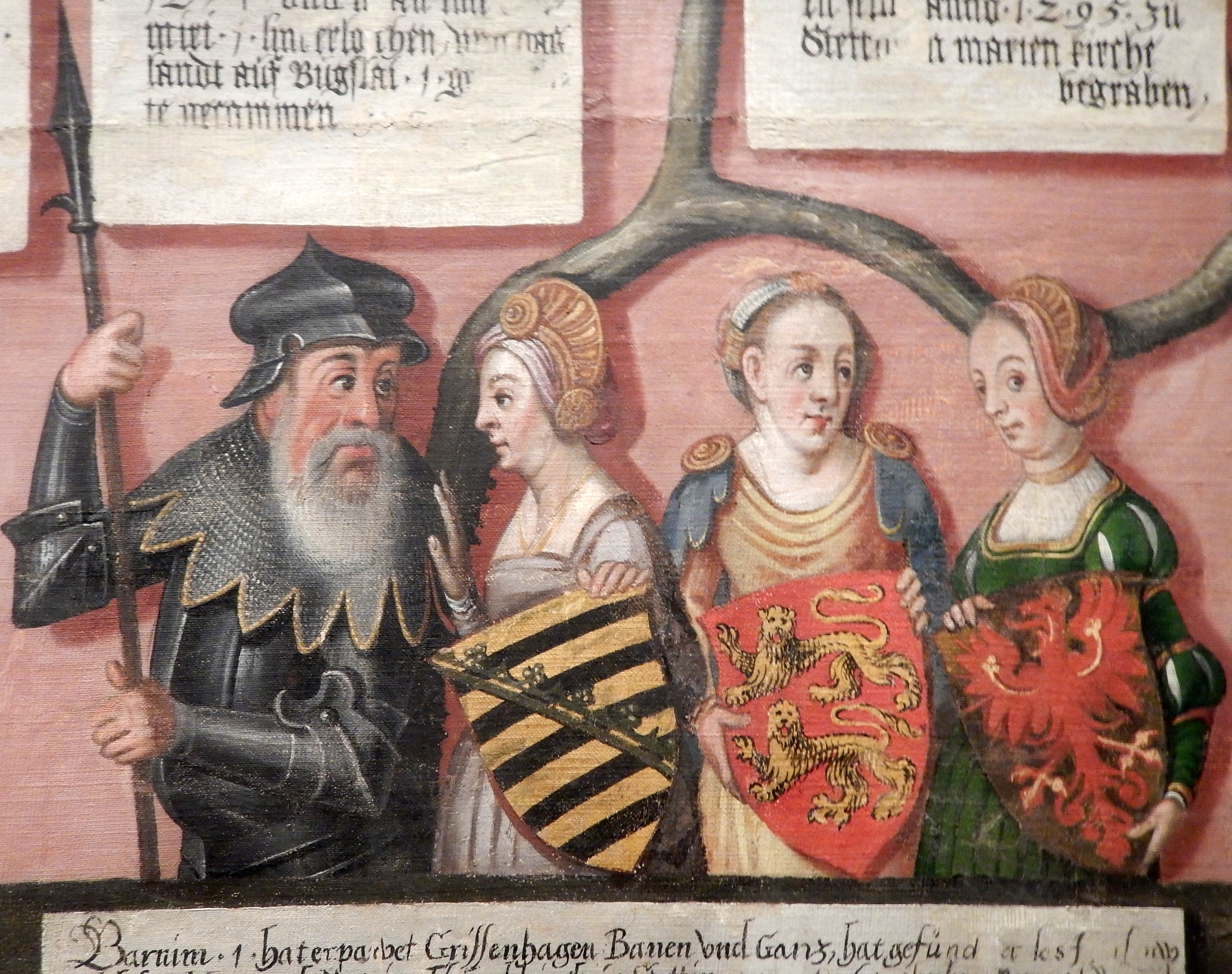
- A later depiction of Barnim and his three wives
- Born: c. 1217/1219
- Died: 13 November 1278; Dąbie, Szczecin
- Noble family: House of Griffin
- Spouses: Marianna; Margareta; Matilda of Brandenburg
- Issue Detail: Bogislaw IV; Barnim II; Otto I
- Father: Bogislaw II, Duke of Pomerania
- Mother: Miroslava of Pomerelia

Barnim I the Good (c. 1217/1219 – 13 November 1278), from the Griffin dynasty, was a Duke of Pomerania (ducis Slauorum et Cassubie) from 1220 until his death.

== Life ==
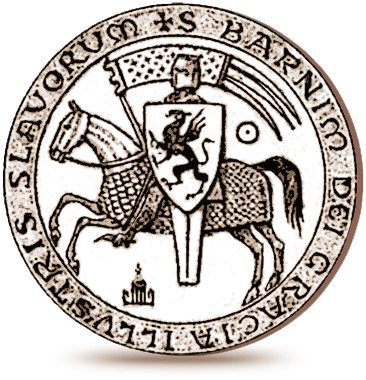
Seal of Barnim I

Son of Duke Bogislaw II and Miroslava of Pomerelia, he succeeded to the Duchy of Pomerania-Stettin upon his father's death in 1220; he had, however, to share the rule of Pomerania with his cousin Wartislaw III, who resided at Demmin. Because he was minor when his father died, until about 1226 his lands were under the regency of his mother Miroslawa from the Pomerelian Samborides dynasty. At first still a Danish fief, the Pomeranian lands fell back to the Holy Roman Empire after the victory of several North-German princes at the 1227 Battle of Bornhöved. Emperor Frederick II of Hohenstaufen in 1231 put the Duchy of Pomerania under the suzerainty of the Ascanian margraves of Brandenburg, disregarding the tenure of the Griffin dynasty, and thereby fueling the long-term Brandenburg–Pomeranian conflict.

After his cousin Wartislaw III had formally accepted the Brandenburg overlordship by the 1236 Treaty of Kremmen, Duke Barnim I came to terms with the mighty Ascanian margraves in the 1250 Treaty of Landin: he confessed himself a Brandenburg vassal and had to renounce the Uckermark region, nevertheless he reached the consent, that the fief of his cousin Wartislaw would remain with the Griffin dynasty upon his death. When Duke Wartislaw III died in 1264, Barnim I was able to unite the whole Duchy of Pomerania under his rule. He promoted the Ostsiedlung by introducing German settlers and customs into the duchy, established many towns, among them Prenzlau, Szczecin, Gartz, Anklam, Stargard, Gryfino, Police, Pyrzyce, Ueckermünde and Goleniów. He was also known for his generous ecclesiastical foundations, and supported the extension of the secular reign of the Cammin bishops in the Kołobrzeg area.

Duke Barnim died at the town of Dąbie (Altdamm), today part of Szczecin. The Minnesinger Meister Rumelant wrote a dirge in his honour.

== Marriages and issue ==
Between 4 September 1238 and 18 July 1242, Barnim I married firstly with Marianna (d. 27 June 1252), whose parentage is disputed: she was either identified as a daughter of King Eric X of Sweden, or a member of the House of Ascania as daughter of either Count Albert II of Weimar-Orlamünde, Count Henry I of Anhalt or Albert I, Duke of Saxony. Modern historiography considers that her origins are unknown. They had one daughter:

- Anastasia (b. 1245 – d. 15 March 1317), married in 1259 to Henry I the Pilgrim, Lord of Mecklenburg.

Between 1253 and 1254, Barnim I married secondly with Margareta (b. aft. 1231 – d. bef. 27 May 1261), probably a daughter of Nicholas I, Lord of Werle and member of the House of Mecklenburg, although other sources identified her as a daughter of Otto the Child, Duke of Brunswick-Lüneburg. Historian Robert Klempin identified her as the widow of Vitslav I, Prince of Rügen, but this seems very doubtful from a chronological view. They had one son:

- Bogislaw IV (bef. 1258 – 19 February 1309), co-ruler from 1276 and sole ruler after his father's death, sharing power with his younger half-brothers

Before 20 May 1267, Barnim I married thirdly with Matilda (b. ca. 1255 – 20 December 1316), a daughter of Otto III, Margrave of Brandenburg. They had five children:

- Miroslawa (c. 1270 – d. between 23 December 1327 and 11 November 1328), married in 1285 to Niklot I, Count of Schwerin
- Beatrix (d. 1315 or 1316), married bef. 1290 to Henry II, Lord of Werle in Penzlin, son of Henry I of Werle
- Matilda (d. young, 1295)
- Barnim II (1277 – 28 May 1295)
- Otto I (b. posthumously, 1279 – d. 30 or 31 December 1344).

== See also ==
- List of Pomeranian duchies and dukes
- History of Pomerania
- Duchy of Pomerania
- House of Griffin

== Notes ==
Barnim I House of Pomerania Born: before 1219 Died: December 13 1278
Preceded by Bogislaw II of Pomerania-Stettin	Duke of Pomerania; 1220–1278	Succeeded by Bogislaw IV
Preceded by Wartislaw III of Pomerania-Demmin (until 1264)	Duke of Pomerania; 1220–1278	Succeeded by Bogislaw IV
