= Otto I of Pomerania =

Otto I, Duke of Pomerania
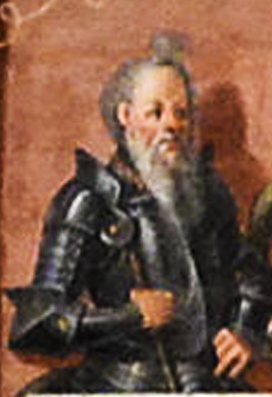
- Born: 1279
- Died: 31 December 1344
- Noble family: House of Griffin
- Spouse: Elizabeth of Holstein
- Issue: Barnim III; Mechtild
- Father: Barnim I, Duke of Pomerania
- Mother: Mechtild of Brandenburg-Salzwedel

Otto I, Duke of Pomerania (1279 – 31 December 1344) was Duke of Pomerania-Stettin.

Youngest, and probably posthumous, son of Duke Barnim I and his third wife, Mechtild of Brandenburg-Salzwedel, Otto became titular co-ruler at his birth, along with his elder half-brother Barnim II and his much older half-brother Bogislaw IV.

Bogislaw was effectively sole ruler while Barnim and Otto were children, and it was not until 1294 that he shared power with his elder brothers. In 1295, with Barnim dead, the brothers divided Pomerania with Otto as ruler of Stettin while Bogislaw received Wolgast.

In 1296 Otto married Elizabeth of Holstein, daughter of Gerhard II, Count of Holstein-Plön. Their children included Barnim III, future Duke of Pomerania, and Mechtild, who married John III, Lord of Werle.

From 1320 his son Barnim (III) was co-ruler with Otto.

== See also ==
- List of Pomeranian duchies and dukes
- History of Pomerania
- Duchy of Pomerania
- House of Pomerania

Otto I of Pomerania House of Pomerania Born: 1279 Died: December 31, 1344
Preceded by Bogislaw IV	Duke of Pomerania-Stettin; 1294–1344	Succeeded by Barnim III
