= Barnim II =

Duke of Pomerania

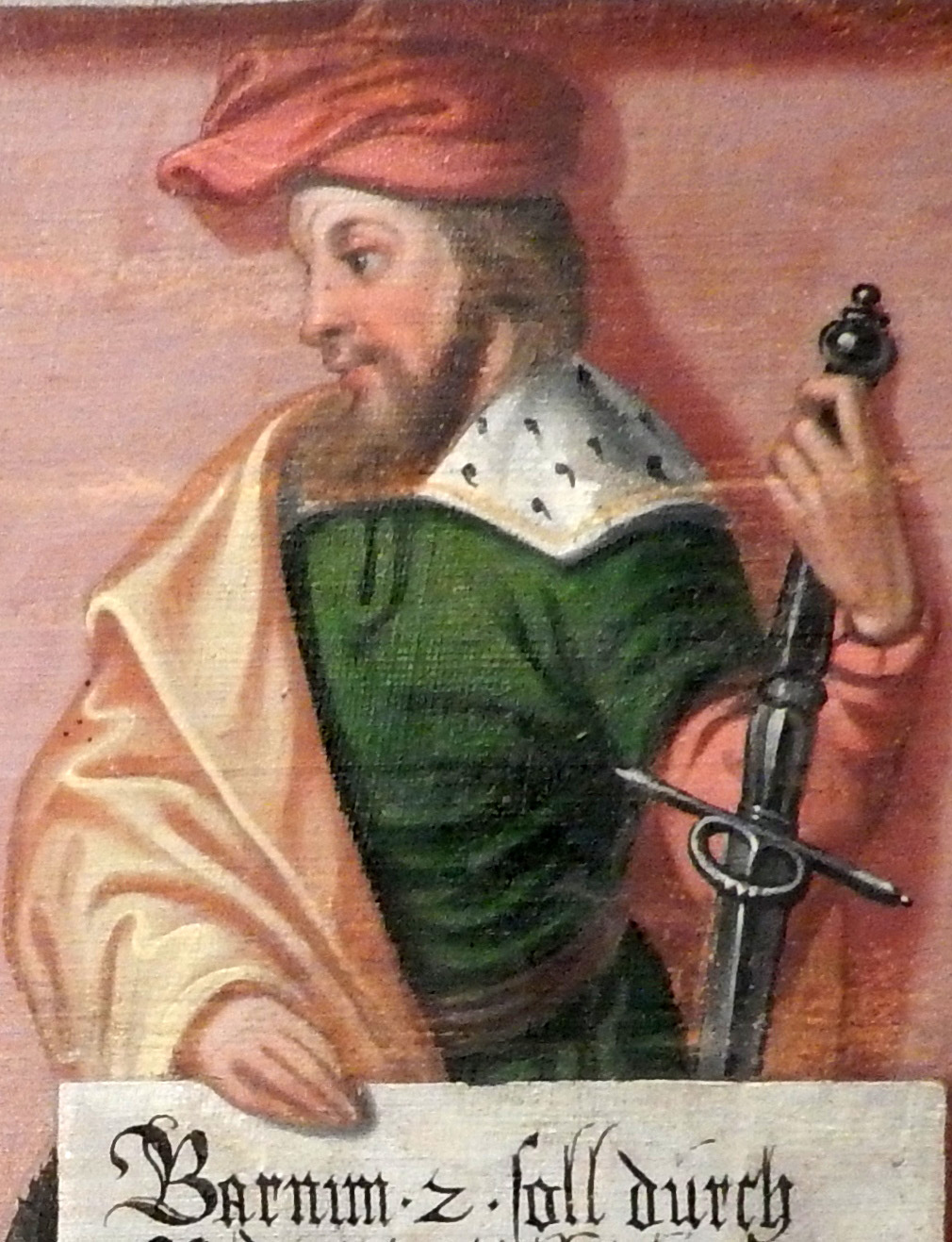

Barnim II (c. 1277 – 28 May 1295) was Duke of Pomerania.

Son of Duke Barnim I and his third wife, Mechtild of Brandenburg, Barnim's father died in 1278 when he was still a child. He was titular co-ruler with younger brother Otto I and his much older half-brother Bogislaw IV, in whose hands effective power lay. Protected by his mother, Barnim had no real power until 1294 when he and Otto gained a share in ruling Pomerania.

He was killed the following year, in the Ueckermünder Heide, by an irate husband whose wife he had seduced. He left no children and Pomerania was ruled by Bogislaw and Otto after his death.

== See also ==
- List of Pomeranian duchies and dukes
- History of Pomerania
- Duchy of Pomerania
- House of Pomerania

Barnim II House of Pomerania Born: ~ 1277 Died: 28 May 1295
Preceded by Bogislaw IV	Duke of Pomerania; 1278-1295	Succeeded by Bogislaw IV of Pomerania-Wolgast
Preceded by Bogislaw IV	Duke of Pomerania; 1278-1295	Succeeded by Otto I of Pomerania-Stettin
