= Neuhabsburg Castle =

Castle in Meggen, Switzerland

Coordinates: 47°02′30″N 8°22′25″E

Ruins of Neuhabsburg in 1782

Neuhabsburg Castle (German: Schloss Neuhabsburg) is a privately owned castle located in Meggen, Lucerne, Switzerland, built on the ruins of a much older castle. In 1244 the income from the land was granted to the Fraumünster Abbey in Zurich. In 1244/5 the original castle was built by the Habsburg family on the shore of Lake Lucerne. The castle may have been built to replace the old Meggenhorn fort. While it may have been the summer home of Rudolph I it mostly served as the administration building for a small Habsburg department that covered Weggis, Lippertschwil, Küssnacht, Immensee, Kehrsiten, Greppen, Udligenswil, Arth and Holzhäusern. The castle was damaged in 1245 following the excommunication of Frederick II by Pope Innocent IV at the Council of Lyon. Following the creation of the Old Swiss Confederacy in 1291, the castle was an obstacle to the new Confederation. However, it was not destroyed until 1352, after Lucerne had joined the original Forest Cantons.

Of the original castle only portions of the square main tower, a thick ring wall and several other buildings remain.

The current castle was built in 1871 in a Gothic Revival style and remains privately owned.

== See also ==
- List of castles and fortresses in Switzerland
