= Otto VI of Brandenburg-Salzwedel =

German margrave (c. 1255-1303)

Otto VI
- Born: c. 1255
- Died: 1303
- Noble family: House of Ascania
- Spouse: Hedwig of Habsburg
- Father: Otto III, Margrave of Brandenburg
- Mother: Beatrice of Bohemia

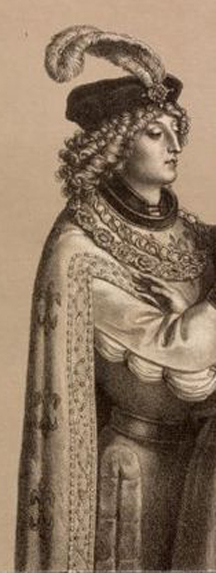
Otto VI.jpg

Otto VI, Margrave of Brandenburg-Salzwedel, nicknamed Otto the Short (c. 1255 – 1303 in Lehnin) was a member of the House of Ascania and co-ruler of Brandenburg. He was a son of Margrave Otto III and his wife, Beatrice of Bohemia.

In 1267, his father died and Otto succeeded as margrave, jointly with his brothers and cousins.

In 1279, Otto married Hedwig, the daughter of King Rudolph I of Germany. This marriage remained childless.

In 1286, he abdicated and became a Knight Templar. Later, he became a Cistercian monk. He died in 1303, around the age of 48.

Otto VI of Brandenburg-Salzwedel House of Ascania Born: c. 1255 Died: 1303
Preceded by Otto III	Margrave of Brandenburg; 1267–1286; With: Otto IV, John II, Henry I, Conrad I, and Otto V	Succeeded by Otto IV, Henry I, Conrad I, and Otto V
