= Rudolf II of Austria =

Rudolf II
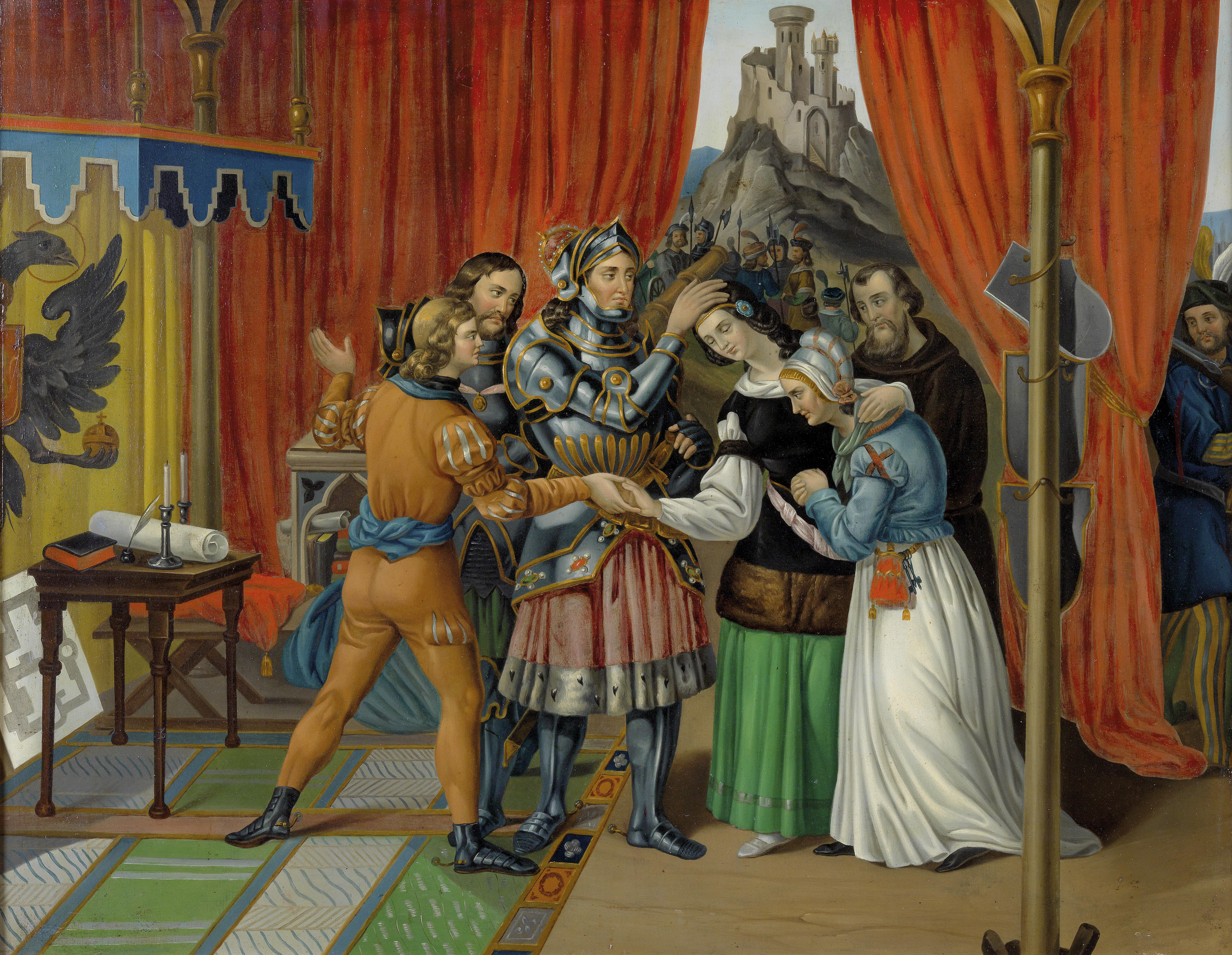
- Rudolf I in the marriage of his son Rudolf II to Agnes of Bohemia, Duchess of Austria.

Duke of Austria and Styria with Albert I
- Reign: 1282 – 1 June 1283
- Predecessor: Rudolf I of Germany
- Successor: Albert I of Germany
- Born: c. 1270; Rheinfelden, Swabia
- Died: 10 May 1290 (aged c. 20); Prague, Bohemia
- Burial: St. Vitus Cathedral, Prague
- Spouse: Agnes of Bohemia, Duchess of Austria
- Issue: John Parricida
- House: House of Habsburg
- Father: Rudolf I of Germany
- Mother: Gertrude of Hohenberg

Rudolf II (c. 1270 – 10 May 1290), a member of the House of Habsburg, was Duke of Austria and Styria from 1282 to 1283, jointly with his elder brother Albert I, who succeeded him.

== Biography ==
Rudolf II was born in Rheinfelden, Swabia, the youngest son of Count Rudolf of Habsburg and his first wife Gertrude of Hohenberg to survive infancy. In 1273 his father was elected king of Germany, the first of the Habsburg dynasty, whereafter he seized the "princeless" duchies of Austria, Styria and Carinthia from the Bohemian king Ottokar II. After King Ottokar was defeated and killed in the 1278 Battle on the Marchfeld, King Rudolf in December 1282 vested his sons Albert and Rudolf II with the Austrian and Styrian duchies. However, in the Treaty of Rheinfelden on 1 June 1283 Rudolf II had to relinquish his share in favour of his elder brother Albert.

In compensation Rudolf II was designated as future king and his father appointed him a "duke of Swabia" - more or less an honorific title, as the former stem duchy had been in long-term disarray after the last Hohenstaufen duke, the underage Conradin, was killed in 1268. In Swabia the former counts of Habsburg only held various smaller home territories, later summed up as Further Austria, of which Rudolf II never got hold.

In the course of the reconciliation process with the Bohemian Přemyslid dynasty, Rudolf II in 1289 married Agnes of Bohemia, Duchess of Austria (1269-1296), daughter of the late King Ottokar II. Rudolf II died suddenly at the age of 20 in Prague, where he stayed at the court of his brother-in-law King Wenceslaus II. In the same year his son, John Parricida, was born. His brother's failure to ensure that Rudolf II would be adequately compensated for relinquishing his claim on the throne caused strife in the Habsburg dynasty, leading to the assassination of Albert I by Rudolph's son, John, in 1308.

Rudolf II of Austria House of Habsburg Born: 1270 Died: 10 May 1290
Preceded by Rudolph I	Duke of Austria and Styria with Albert I 1282-1283	Succeeded by Albert I
