= Rudolf I of Germany =

King of the Romans from 1273 to 1291

Rudolf I
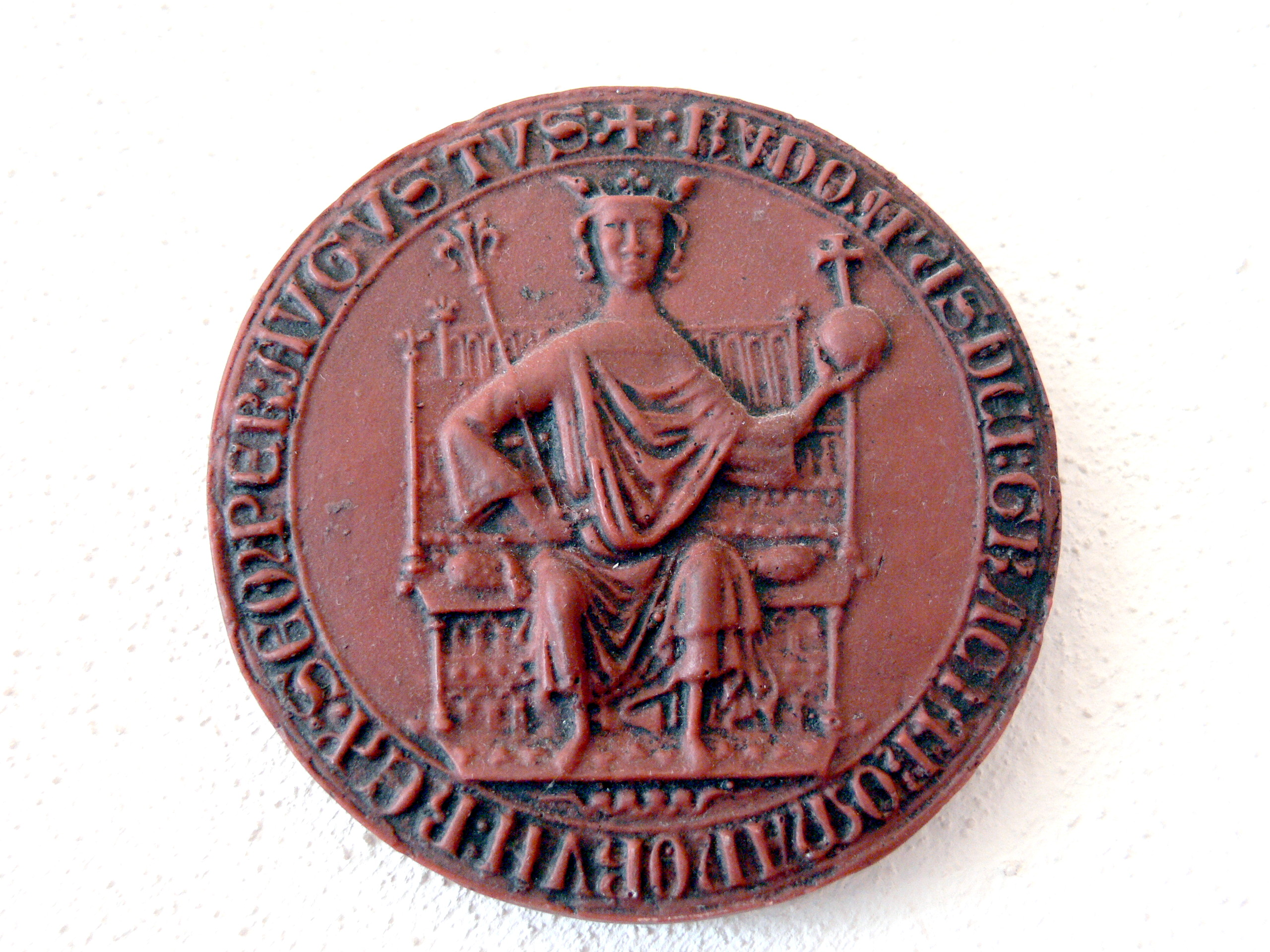
- Seal of Rudolf I inscribed: RUDOLFUS DEI GRACIA ROMANORUM REX SEMPER AUGUSTUS ("Rudolf by the grace of God King of the Romans, ever majestic")

king of the Romans
- Reign: 1 October 1273 – 15 July 1291
- Coronation: 24 October 1273; Aachen Cathedral
- Predecessor: (Richard of Cornwall); Interregnum
- Successor: Adolf of Nassau
- Born: 1 May 1218; Limburgh Castle near Sasbach am Kaiserstuhl
- Died: 15 July 1291 (aged 73); Speyer
- Burial: Speyer Cathedral
- Spouses: Gertrude of Hohenberg; Isabella of Burgundy
- Issue more...: Matilda, Duchess of Bavaria; Albert I, King of Germany; Catherine, Duchess of Bavaria; Agnes, Duchess of Saxony; Hedwig, Margravine of Brandenburg; Clementia, Queen of Hungary; Rudolf II, Duke of Austria; Judith, Queen of Bohemia
- House: Habsburg
- Father: Albert IV, Count of Habsburg
- Mother: Hedwig of Kyburg

Rudolf of Habsburg (1 May 1218 – 15 July 1291) was a German nobleman and the first member of the House of Habsburg to become King of the Romans, reigning from 1273 until his death.

Born into a relatively minor noble family, Rudolf succeeded his father as Count of Habsburg in 1240, gradually expanding his power through military campaigns, political alliances, and the construction of key fortresses such as Neuhabsburg Castle. His marriage to Gertrude of Hohenberg further strengthened his position among the Swabian nobility.

During the turbulent period of the Great Interregnum, Rudolf distinguished himself both as a formidable military leader—participating in regional conflicts and even joining the Prussian Crusade in 1254—and as a restorer of order, often intervening against robber barons and feuding nobles.

Despite facing excommunication due to disputes with the Church, Rudolf ultimately reconciled with ecclesiastical authorities and built a reputation for fairness and pragmatism. In 1273, he was elected King of the Romans, ending decades of imperial vacancy and division.

As king, Rudolf reasserted imperial authority in Germany, notably defeating King Ottokar II of Bohemia and securing Habsburg control over Austria, Styria, and Carinthia. His reign laid the foundations for the rise of the Habsburg dynasty, which would become one of the most influential royal houses in European history. Rudolf died in 1291, leaving a legacy of restored stability and dynastic ambition within the Holy Roman Empire.

== Early life ==
Rudolf was born on 1 May 1218 at Limburgh Castle near Sasbach am Kaiserstuhl in the Breisgau region of present-day southwestern Germany. He was the son of Count Albert IV of Habsburg and Hedwig, daughter of Count Ulrich of Kyburg. The Habsburgs derive their name from Habichtsburg Castle near Brugg in Aargau, which was probably built by Guntram the Rich in 1020. According to the chronicler Matthias of Neuchâtel from the mid-14th century, Emperor Frederick II was Rudolf's godfather. However, Rudolf was not educated at the royal court and probably knew neither writing nor Latin. Rudolf had four siblings: two brothers, Albrecht and Hartmann, and two sisters, Kunigunde and another whose name is unknown. Rudolf's father Albrecht IV joined the Barons' Crusade in the summer of 1239. When news of his death arrived in 1240, Rudolf assumed sole rule of the main Habsburg line.

== Count of Habsburg ==
At his father's death in 1239, Rudolf inherited from him large estates around the ancestral seat of Habsburg Castle in the Aargau region of present-day Switzerland as well as in Alsace. Thus, in 1240, Early in his rule, Rudolf became embroiled in disputes with neighboring nobles such as Hugo von Tiefenstein, which led to military confrontations and the eventual destruction of Tiefenstein’s stronghold. Around 1244, Rudolf constructed Neuhabsburg Castle on Lake Lucerne, strengthening his family's presence in central Switzerland and consolidating his territorial base. In 1253, Rudolf married Gertrude of Hohenberg, an alliance that enhanced his political standing and brought valuable connections, particularly in Swabia. Amidst the ongoing conflicts between secular and ecclesiastical authorities, Rudolf sometimes clashed with church officials; at one point, his actions against the Bishop of Basel resulted in his excommunication, though he later reconciled with the Church. In 1254, Rudolf joined the Prussian Crusade, a campaign led by the Teutonic Order against pagan Prussian tribes, which not only enhanced his reputation as a Christian knight but also expanded his network among the German nobility.

== Rise to power ==
After the death of Frederick II in 1250, the Holy Roman Empire plunged into a period of political turmoil known as the Great Interregnum. Frederick’s son, Conrad IV, briefly attempted to assert his claim to the throne but faced strong opposition from the papacy and rival princes, ultimately dying in 1254 without consolidating his rule. In the ensuing chaos, William of Holland was elected king by a faction of princes but struggled to establish authority beyond his core territories and died in 1256. The double election of 1257 resulted in two kings being installed in the empire: Alfonso X of Castile and Richard of Cornwall. However neither of them was able to secure effective control over the Holy Roman Empire or achieve imperial coronation by the pope. Richard visited Germany only a few times and lacked a strong power base there, while Alfonso, ruling from Spain, never set foot in Germany and was unable to assert his authority. Both men struggled to gain widespread recognition, enforce their rule, or gain the papal approval necessary for imperial coronation.

The disorder in Germany during the interregnum afforded an opportunity for Count Rudolf to increase his possessions. His wife was a Hohenberg heiress; and on the death of his childless maternal uncle Count Hartmann IV of Kyburg in 1264, Rudolf seized Hartmann's valuable estates. Successful feuds with the Bishops of Strasbourg and Basel further augmented his wealth and reputation, including rights over various tracts of land that he purchased from abbots and others.

In August 1273, in view of the situation in the Holy Roman Empire, the pope Gregory X issued an ultimatum to the electors to choose a king. The pope added the threat that he would appoint an emperor if the electors could not agree on the election of a king. In September 1273, the electors, with the exception of Ottokar II, agreed on Rudolf. Ottokar II stayed away from the election; his place was taken by Henry XIII, Duke of Lower Bavaria.The electors assembled in Frankfurt unanimously elected Rudolf on October 1, 1273. Soon after, Rudolf reached Frankfurt and proceeded to Aachen with the princes, where on October 24, 1273, Archbishop Engelbert II of Cologne formally crowned him in Charlemagne's cathedral. Rudolf ignored Pope Gregory X's claim to approval. Despite the Curia's reluctance, the Habsburg's support for the Staufers, for which he had been excommunicated in 1248, had not yet been forgotten, the pope eventually acknowledged Rudolf's election on September 20, 1274.

Rudolf met with Gregory X on October 20, 1275, to discuss the Lausanne Cathedral's consecration. King Rudolf promised the pope during this meeting that he would defend the Church's rights and property and that Sicily and the Empire would not be merged. The king's legally enforceable pledge marked a break from the Staufer dynasty's power-politics strategy. Rudolf was invited to Rome for his imperial coronation after he accepted the cross from the pope's hand and was officially acknowledged as king. It was widely accepted that the coronation date would be February 2, 1276. Before the agreed date, Pope Gregory X died on January 10, 1276, and the king was initially busy dealing with the aftermath of the interregnum and fully occupied with the fight against King Ottokar II of Bohemia.

== King of the Germans ==
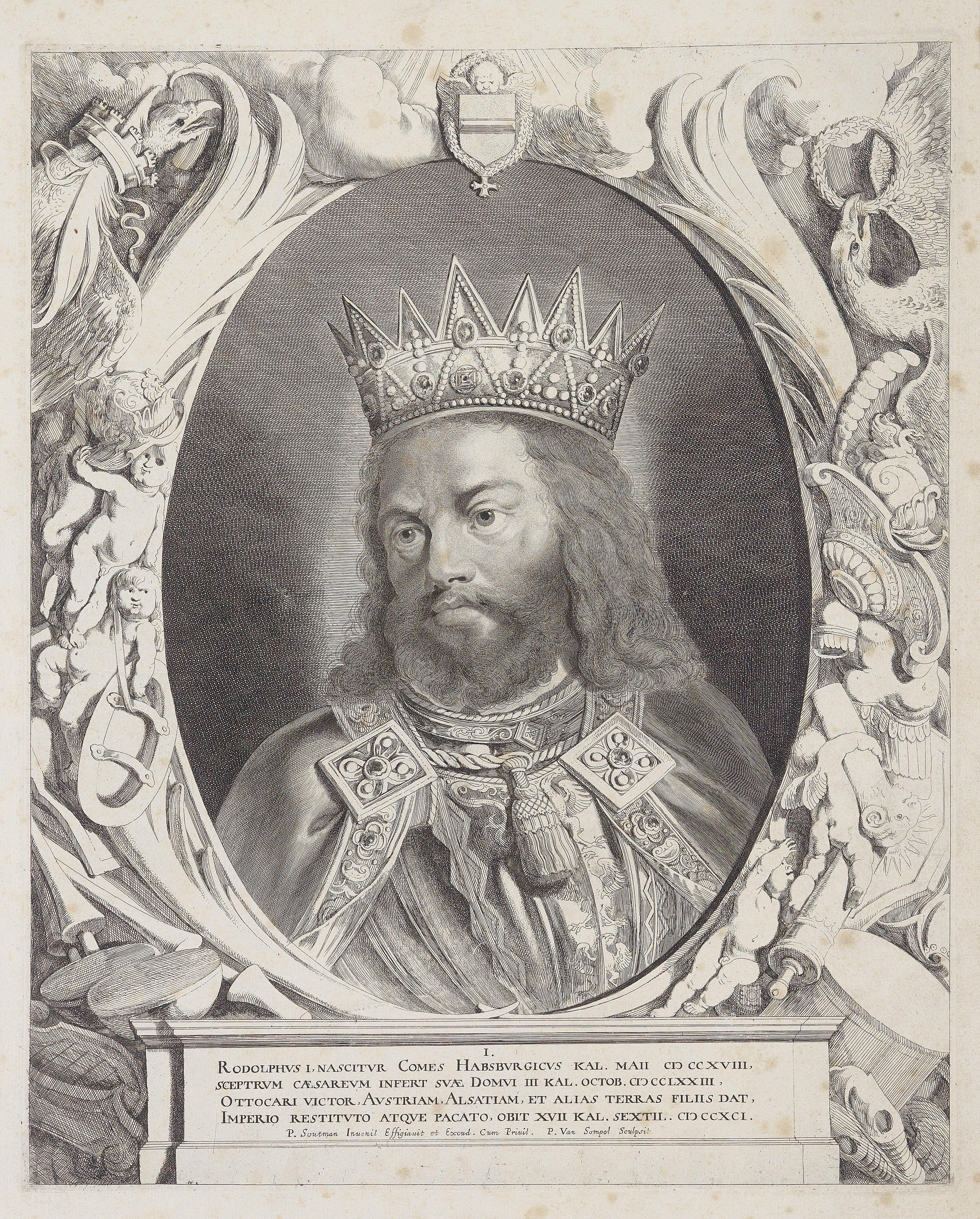
Engraving of Rudolf I of Habsburg, c. 1640

In November 1274, the Imperial Diet at Nuremberg decided that all Crown estates seized since the death of the Emperor Frederick II must be restored, and that King Ottokar II must answer to the Diet for not recognising the new king. Ottokar refused to appear or to restore the duchies of Austria, Styria and Carinthia together with the March of Carniola, which he had claimed through his first wife, a Babenberg heiress, and which he had seized while disputing them with another Babenberg heir, Margrave Hermann VI of Baden. Rudolf refused to accept Ottokar's succession to the Babenberg patrimony, declaring that the provinces reverted to the Imperial crown due to the lack of male-line heirs. King Ottokar was placed under the imperial ban; and in June 1276 war was declared against him.

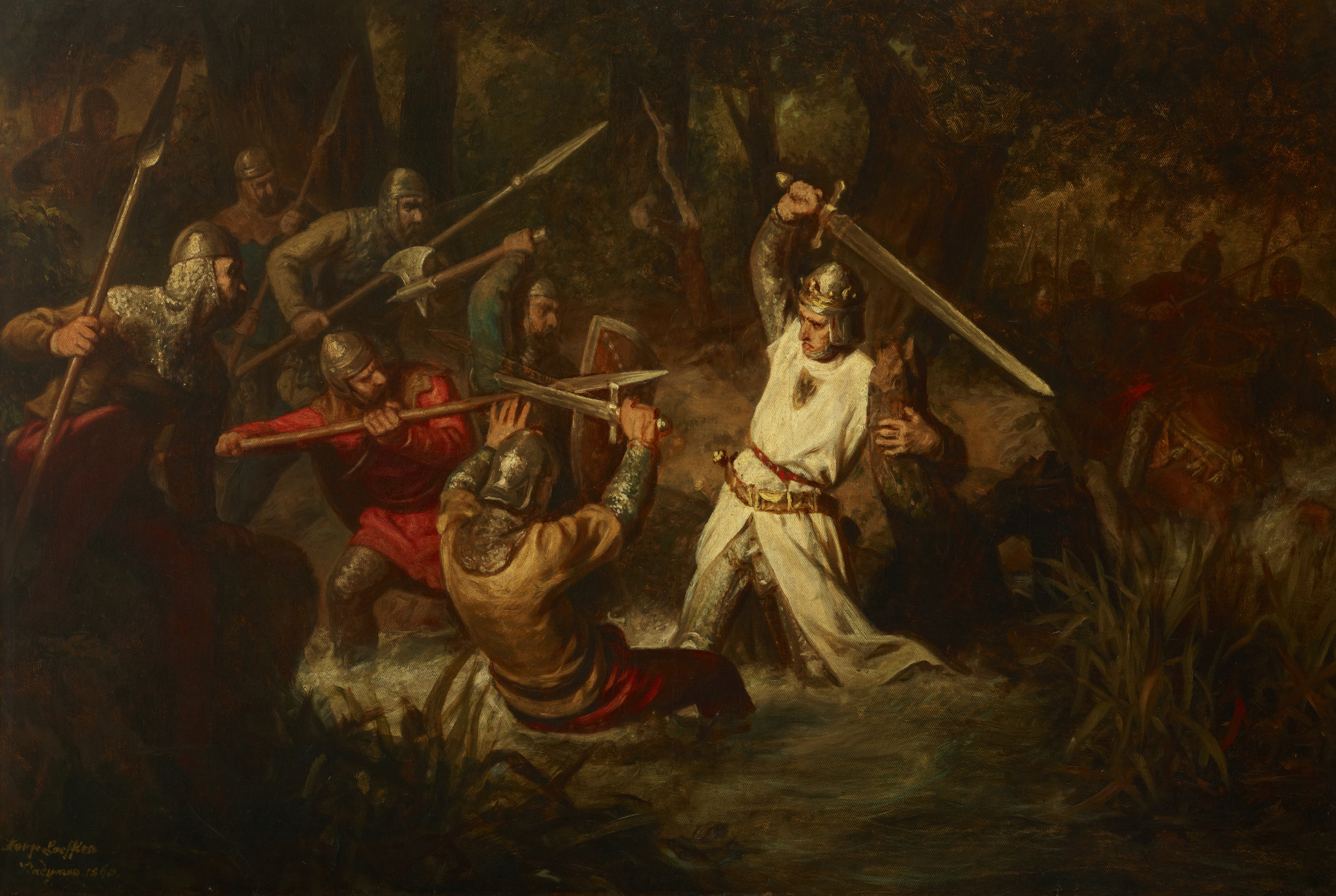
Emperor Rudolf I in the Battle of Marchfeld, a 19th century depiction by Leopold Loeffler

Having persuaded Ottokar's former ally Duke Henry XIII of Lower Bavaria to switch sides, Rudolf compelled the Bohemian king to cede the four provinces to the control of the royal administration in November 1276. Rudolf then re-invested Ottokar with the Kingdom of Bohemia, betrothed one of his daughters to Ottokar's son Wenceslaus II, and made a triumphal entry into Vienna. Ottokar, however, raised questions about the execution of the treaty, and procured the support of several German princes, again including Henry XIII of Lower Bavaria. To meet this coalition, Rudolf formed an alliance with King Ladislaus IV of Hungary and gave additional privileges to the Viennese citizens. On 26 August 1278, the rival armies met at the Battle on the Marchfeld, where Ottokar was defeated and killed. The Margraviate of Moravia was subdued and its government entrusted to Rudolf's representatives, leaving Ottokar's widow Kunigunda of Slavonia in control of only the province surrounding Prague, while the young Wenceslaus II was again betrothed to Rudolf's youngest daughter Judith.

Rudolf's attention next turned to the possessions in Austria and the adjacent provinces, which were taken into the royal domain. He spent several years establishing his authority there but found some difficulty in establishing his family as successors to the rule of those provinces. At length, the hostility of the princes was overcome. In December 1282, at the Hoftag (imperial diet) in Augsburg, Rudolf invested his sons, Albert and Rudolf II, with the duchies of Austria and Styria and so laid the foundation of the House of Habsburg. Additionally, he made the twelve-year-old Rudolf Duke of Swabia, a merely titular dignity, as the duchy had been without an actual ruler since Conradin's execution. The 27-year-old Duke Albert, married since 1274 to a daughter of Count Meinhard II of Gorizia-Tyrol (1238–95), was capable enough to hold some sway in the new patrimony.

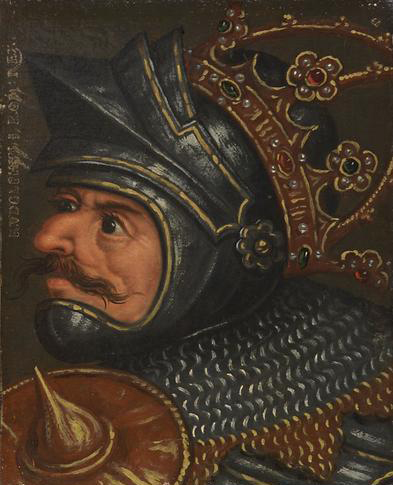
Rudolph I of Austria

In 1286, King Rudolf fully invested Albert's father-in-law Count Meinhard with the Duchy of Carinthia, one of the conquered provinces taken from Ottokar. The Princes of the Empire did not allow Rudolf to give everything that was recovered to the royal domain to his own sons, and his allies needed their rewards too. Turning to the west, in 1281 he compelled Count Philip I of Savoy to cede some territory to him, then forced the citizens of Bern to pay the tribute that they had been refusing. After his son Rudolf II defeated Bern at the Battle of Schosshalde, he strengthened his authority in Switzerland. He further expanded his Swiss possessions and granted some ecclesiastical posts to his family. In 1289 he marched against Count Philip's successor, Otto IV, compelling him to do homage.

In 1281, Rudolf's first wife died. On 5 February 1284, he married Isabella, daughter of Duke Hugh IV of Burgundy, the Empire's western neighbor in the Kingdom of France.

Rudolf was not very successful in restoring internal peace. Orders were indeed issued for the establishment of territorial peaces in Bavaria, Franconia and Swabia, and at the Synod of Würzburg in March 1287 for the whole Empire. But the king lacked the power, resources, and determination to enforce them, although in December 1289 he led an expedition into Thuringia, where he destroyed a number of robber castles. In 1291, he attempted to secure the election of his son Albert as German king. The electors refused, however, claiming inability to support two kings, but in reality, perhaps, wary of the increasing power of the House of Habsburg. Upon Rudolf's death they elected Count Adolf of Nassau.

== Persecution of the Jews ==
In 1286, Rudolf I instituted a new persecution of the Jews, declaring them servi camerae ("serfs of the treasury"), which had the effect of negating their political freedoms. Along with many others, Rabbi Meir of Rothenburg left Germany with family and followers, but was captured in Lombardy and imprisoned in a fortress in Alsace. Tradition has it that a large ransom of 23,000 marks silver was raised for him (by the Rosh), but Rabbi Meir refused it, for fear of encouraging the imprisonment of other rabbis. He died in prison after seven years. Fourteen years after his death a ransom was paid for his body by Alexander ben Shlomo (Süsskind) Wimpfen, who was subsequently laid to rest beside the Maharam.

== Death ==
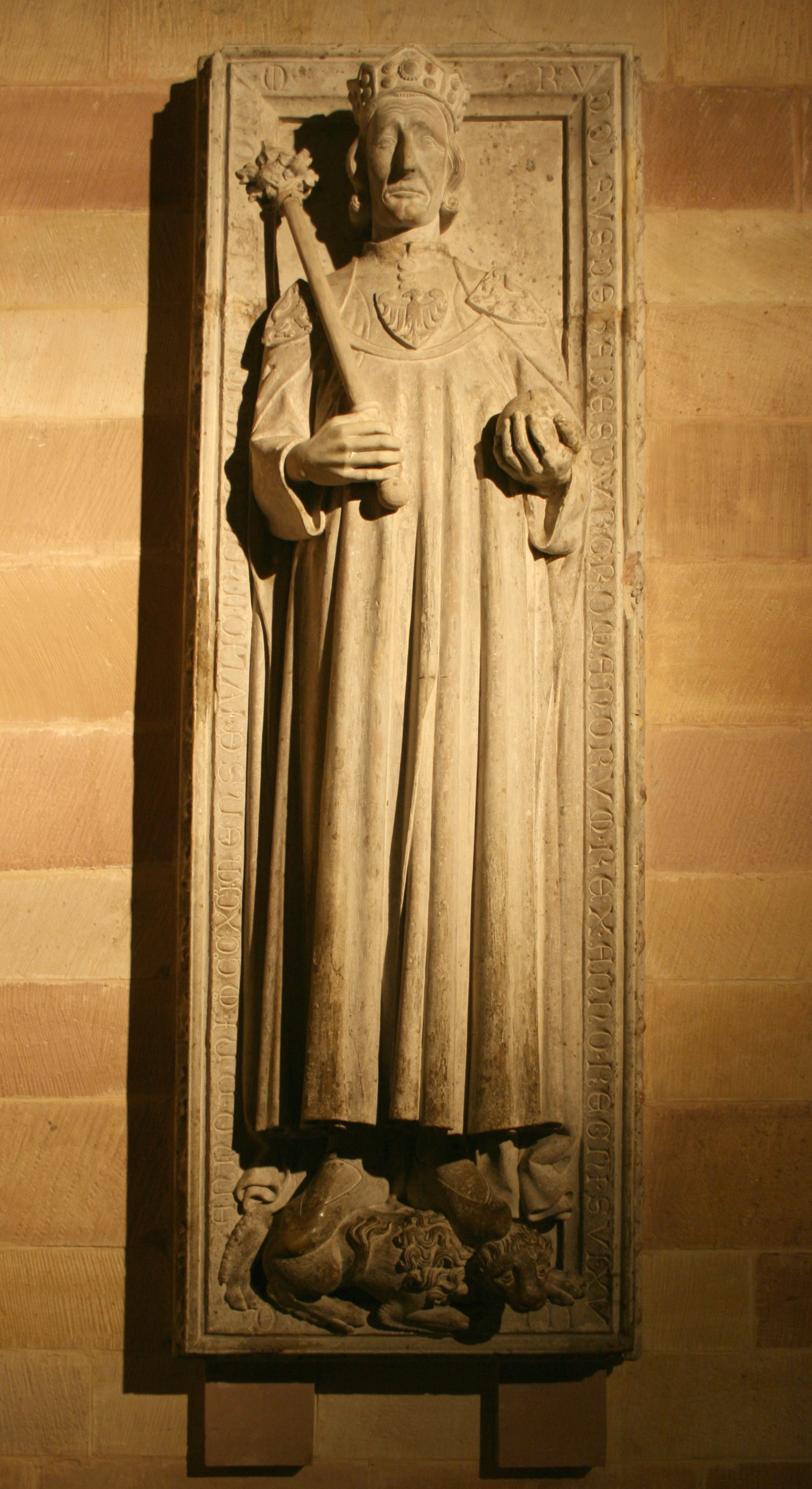
Rudolf's cenotaph in Speyer Cathedral

Rudolf died in Speyer on 15 July 1291 and was buried in Speyer Cathedral. Only one of his sons survived him: Albert I. Most of his daughters outlived him, apart from Catherine who had died in 1282 during childbirth and Hedwig who had died in 1285/6.

Rudolf's reign is most memorable for his establishment of the House of Habsburg as a powerful dynasty in the southeastern part of the realm. In the other territories, the centuries-long decline of Imperial authority since the days of the Investiture Controversy continued, and the princes were largely left to their own devices.

In the Divine Comedy, Dante finds Rudolf sitting outside the gates of purgatory with his contemporaries, characterizing him as "he who neglected that which he ought to have done".

== Family and children ==
Rudolf was married twice. First, in 1251, to Gertrude of Hohenberg and second, in 1284, to Isabelle of Burgundy. All children were from the first marriage.

1. Matilda (c. 1253, Rheinfelden – 23 December 1304, Munich), married 1273 in Aachen to Duke Louis II of Bavaria and became mother of Duke Rudolf I of Bavaria and Emperor Louis IV
2. Albert I of Germany (July 1255 – 1 May 1308), Duke of Austria and also of Styria
3. Catherine (1256 – 4 April 1282, Landshut), married 1279 in Vienna to Duke Otto III of Bavaria
4. Agnes [Gertrude] (ca. 1257 – 11 October 1322, Wittenberg), married 1273 to Duke Albert II of Saxony and became the mother of Duke Rudolf I of Saxe-Wittenberg
5. Hedwig (c. 1259 – 26 January 1285/27 October 1286), married 1279 in Vienna to Margrave Otto VI of Brandenburg-Salzwedel and left no issue
6. Clementia (c. 1262 – after 7 February 1293), married 1281 in Vienna to Charles Martel of Anjou, the papal claimant to the throne of Hungary
7. Hartmann (1263, Rheinfelden – 21 December 1281), betrothed to Joan of Acre, drowned in Rheinau
8. Rudolf II, Duke of Austria and Styria (1270 – 10 May 1290, Prague), titular Duke of Swabia, father of John the Parricide of Austria
9. Judith (13 March 1271 – 18 June 1297, Prague), married 24 January 1285 to King Wenceslaus II of Bohemia and became the mother of King Wenceslaus III of Bohemia, Poland and Hungary
10. Samson (before 19 Oct 1275 – died young)
11. Charles (14 February 1276 – 16 August 1276)

== See also ==
- Kings of Germany family tree
- Symboli Rudolf

== Bibliography ==
- Abbott, John S. C. (1877). Austria: Its Rise and Present Power. World's Best Histories. New York: The Cooperative Publication Society. OCLC 283257.
- Chisholm, Hugh (ed.). "Rudolf I King of the Romans". Encyclopædia Britannica. Cambridge: Cambridge University Press.
- Coxe, William (1847). From the Foundation of the Monarchy by Rhodolph of Hapsburgh, to the Death of Leopold the Second, 1218 to 1792. History of the House of Austria. Vol. 1. London: Henry G. Bohn.
- Earenfight, Theresa (2013). Queenship in Medieval Europe. London: Palgrave Macmillan. ISBN 978-0-230-27645-1.
- Emerton, Ephraim (1917). The Beginnings of Modern Europe (1250–1450). Boston: Ginn and Company. OCLC 484803.
- George, Hereford Brooke (1875). Genealogical Tables Illustrative of Modern History. Oxford: Clarendon Press.
- Herm, Gerhard (1988). Der Aufstieg des Hauses Habsburg. Düsseldorf, Vienna, New York City: ECON Verlag. ISBN 3-4301-4448-5.
- Jäschke, Kurt-UlrichSteinar (2002). "From Famous Empresses to Unspectacular Queens: The Romano-German Empire to Margaret of Brabant, Countess of Luxemburg and Queen of the Romans". In Duggan, Anne J. (ed.). Queens and Queenship in Medieval Europe. The Boydell Press. ISBN 978-0-851-15881-5.
- Kaufhold, Martin (2000). Deutsches Interregnum und europäische Politik : Konfliktlösungen und Entscheidungsstrukturen 1230-1280. Hannover: Hahnsche Buchhandlung. ISBN 3-7752-5449-8.
- Kohlrausch, Frederick (1847). History of Germany. New York: D. Appleton & Co.
- Redlich, Oswald (1903). Rudolf von Habsburg. Das Deutsche Reich nach dem Untergange des alten Kaisertums. Innsbruck: Verlag der Wagnerischen Universitätsbuchhandlung.
- Reifenscheid, Richard (2000). Die Habsburger in Lebensbildern von Rudolf I. bis Karl I. Kreuzlingen: Hugendubel. ISBN 3-7205-2102-8.
- Toch, Michael; et al. (The New Cambridge Medieval History) (1999). "Welfs, Hohenstaufen and Habsburgs". c. 1198—c. 1300. Vol. V. Cambridge: Cambridge University Press. ISBN 0-521-36289-X.

Rudolf I of Germany House of Habsburg Born: 1218 Died: 1291
Regnal titles
Preceded by Richard (died 1272) and Alfonso as rival kings	King of the Romans; 1273–1291 with Alfonso as contender (1273–1275)	Succeeded by Adolf
Preceded by Ottokar II of Bohemia	Duke of Carinthia and Carniola; 1276–1286	Succeeded by Meinhard
Preceded by Ottokar II of Bohemia	Duke of Austria and Styria; 1278–1282	Succeeded by Albert I Rudolf II
Preceded by Albert IV	Count of Habsburg; 1239–1291; With: Rudolph V (1282–1283)	Succeeded by Albert V Rudolph VI
