= Bogislaw IV of Pomerania =

Bogislaw IV, Duke of Pomerania
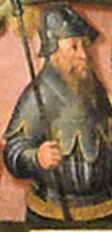
- Born: c. 1255
- Died: 19 February or 24 February 1309
- Noble family: House of Griffin
- Spouses: Mechtild of Brandenburg-Stendal; Margarete of Rügen
- Issue Detail: Euphemia of Pomerania; Wartislaw IV, Duke of Pomerania
- Father: Barnim I, Duke of Pomerania
- Mother: Marianne (House of Eric)

Bogislaw IV (c. 1255 – 19 or 24 February 1309), of the House of Griffin, was Duke of Pomerania from 1278 until his death in 1309.

Bogislaw was the eldest son of Duke Barnim I by his second wife, Margaretha, sometimes said to be a daughter of King Eric X of Sweden. He was an adult at his father's death in 1278, having been co-ruler since 1276. His half-brothers Barnim II and Otto I were still very young and so he was sole ruler in Pomerania during their minority.

In the early 1280s Bogislaw was involved in the war in the neighbouring margraviate of Brandenburg. In 1295, Barnim II died and Pomerania was divided into two parts, with Bogislaw receiving Wolgast and Otto receiving Szczecin (Stettin).

In the 14th century, he was allied with would-be King of Poland Władysław the Short. He was unsuccessfully involved in the opening stages of the decade-long Brandenburg War.

He died in 1309 leaving his share of Pomerania to his son Wartislaw. He is buried in Marienkirche in Stettin.

== Marriage and issue ==
At some point before 14 December 1278, he married Mechtild, daughter of John I and a sister of reigning Margrave Otto IV. However, all of his known children were by a second marriage to Margarethe, daughter of Wizlaw II, Prince of Rügen. He married Margarethe before 1290, possibly in 1283–4. He had one son and at least four daughters:

- Euphemia of Pomerania (died 1330) married Christopher II of Denmark
- Wartislaw IV, Duke of Pomerania, who would later rule in Western Pomerania and inherit Rügen
- Elisabeth (1291–1349), who married Duke Eric I of Saxe-Lauenburg ca. 1318
- Jutta
- Margaret (c. 1287-1334), wife of Nicholas I, Lord of Rostock, then of John Piast (1298-1365)
- possibly another daughter, Euphemia, wife of Adolph V, Count of Holstein-Segeberg

== See also ==
- List of Pomeranian duchies and dukes
- History of Pomerania
- Duchy of Pomerania
- House of Pomerania

Bogislaw IV of Pomerania House of Pomerania Born: c. 1255 Died: February 1309
Preceded by Barnim I	Duke of Pomerania-Wolgast; 1278–1309	Succeeded by Wartislaw IV
