= John Parricida =

Member of the House of Habsburg

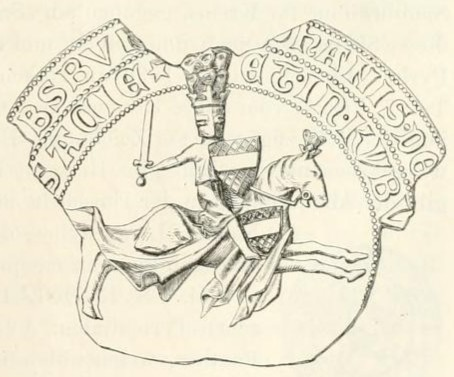
- Seal of John Parricida
- Born: John of Swabia ca. 1290
- Died: 13 December 1312/13
- House: House of Habsburg
- Father: Rudolf II, Duke of Austria
- Mother: Agnes of Bohemia, Duchess of Austria

John Parricida (German: Johann Parricida) or John the Parricide, also called John of Swabia (Johann von Schwaben), (ca. 1290 – 13 December 1312/13) was the son of the Habsburg duke Rudolf II of Austria and Agnes of Bohemia, Duchess of Austria, daughter of King Ottokar II of Bohemia. By killing his uncle, King Albert I of Germany, he foiled the first attempt of the Habsburg dynasty to install a hereditary monarchy in the Holy Roman Empire.

== Life ==
John was born shortly before or after the death of his father Rudolf II, the younger son of King Rudolf I of Germany. His mother was Agnes of Bohemia, Duchess of Austria, daughter of King Ottokar II of Bohemia. He passed his early days at the Bohemian court and the town of Brugg in the Swabian home territory of the Habsburgs, where he is mentioned as titular duke in a 1294 deed.

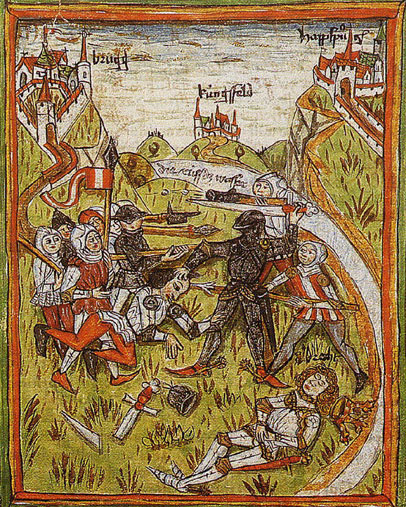
Assassination of King Albert I, Austrian Chronicle of 95 Seigneurs, 14th century

As John's father had been forced to waive his right to the Habsburg duchies of Austria and Styria in favour of his elder brother Albert I according to the 1283 Treaty of Rheinfelden, he felt deprived of his inheritance. When he came of age, he demanded a portion of the family estates from his uncle, who had finally prevailed in the election as King of the Romans against Adolph of Nassau in 1298. His wishes, however, were not granted nor did he receive any of the compensations in the Swabian territories of Further Austria, awarded to his father by the Rheinfelden Treaty. In 1306, King Albert even placed his son, Duke Rudolf III, on the Bohemian throne, denying his nephew's right of inheritance. Thereupon John, mocked as "Duke Lackland" (Hertzog Anlant), with several companions of Swabian nobility formed a plan to murder the king.

A Habsburg family banquet in Winterthur, held by Albert on the evening of 30 April 1308, gave rise to a scandal, when the invitee John rejected a floral wreath offered by his uncle, exclaiming that he would not be fobbed off with flowers. The next day, King Albert on his way home became separated from his attendants when crossing the Reuss River near Windisch, and was at once attacked by John and his conspirators. John rode toward his uncle and split his skull without a word. He escaped the vengeance of Albert's sons, and from that point his fate remained unknown. In the same year, the prince-electors chose the Luxembourg count Henry VII as Albert's successor, who placed John under the imperial ban (Reichsacht). John allegedly fled to Italy and found refuge in a Pisa monastery, where, in 1313, he is said to have been visited by Emperor Henry VII. After the defeat of Albert's son Frederick the Fair at the 1322 Battle of Mühldorf, the Habsburg dynasty was not able to regain the German crown until the election of Albert II in 1438.

== Fictional character ==
The character of John is rendered by Friedrich Schiller in his 1804 drama William Tell: John on the run arrives at Tell's house begging for help and arguing that he had to take revenge on his enemy — like Tell on bailiff Albrecht Gessler. Tell rejects the comparison but directs him to Italy, advising him to seek papal absolution.

John's fate was further perpetuated in the poem Der Graf von Thal (1838) by Annette von Droste-Hülshoff and by the Austrian writer Johann Nepomuk Vogl, whose ballad Der Mönch zu Pisa was set to music by Carl Loewe (Op. 114) in 1846. Historical dramas were written by August Gottlieb Meißner (Johann von Schwaben, 1770) and Julius Grosse (Johann von Schwaben, 1870).

== Male-line family tree ==
House of Habsburg

Original line
Albert; Count of Habsburg c. 1188–1239
Rudolf I of Germany c. 1218–1291
Albert I of Germany; 1255–1308	Hartmann; 1263–1281	Rudolf II; Duke of Austria; 1270–1290
Rudolf I of Bohemia; 1281–1307	Frederick the Fair c. 1289–1330	Leopold I Duke of Austria; 1290–1326	Albert II; Duke of Austria; 1298–1358	Henry the Friendly; 1299–1327	Otto; Duke of Austria; 1301–1339	John; Parricida c. 1290–1312/1313
Albertinian line	Leopoldian line
Rudolf IV; Duke of Austria; 1339–1365	Frederick III; 1347–1362	Albert III; Duke of Austria; 1349–1395	Leopold III; Duke of Austria; 1351–1386	Frederick II; Duke of Austria; 1327–1344	Leopold II; Duke of Austria; 1328–1344
Albert IV; Duke of Austria; 1377–1404	William; Duke of Austria c. 1370–1406	Leopold IV; Duke of Austria; 1371–1411	Ernest; Duke of Austria; 1377–1424	Frederick IV; Duke of Austria; 1382–1439
Albert II of Germany; 1397–1439	Frederick III; HRE; 1415–1493	Albert VI; Archduke of Austria; 1418–1463	Sigismund; Archduke of Austria; 1427–1496
Ladislaus the Posthumous; 1440–1457	Maximilian I HRE; 1459–1519
Philip I of Castile; 1478–1506
Spanish / Iberian line	Austrian / HRE line
Charles V HRE; 1500–1558	Ferdinand I HRE; 1503–1564
Philip II of Spain; 1527–1598	Maximilian II; HRE; 1527–1576	Ferdinand II; Archduke of Austria; 1529–1595	Charles II; Archduke of Austria; 1540–1590
Carlos; Prince of Asturias; 1545–1568	Philip III of Spain; 1578–1621	Rudolf II; HRE; 1552–1612	Ernest of Austria; 1553–1595	Matthias; HRE; 1557–1619	Maximilian III; Archduke of Austria; 1558–1618	Albert VII; Archduke of Austria; 1559–1621	Wenceslaus; Archduke of Austria; 1561–1578	Andrew; Margrave of Burgau; 1558–1600	Charles; Margrave of Burgau; 1560–1618	Ferdinand II; HRE; 1578–1637	Maximilian Ernest of Austria; 1583–1616	Leopold V Archduke of Austria; 1586–1632	Charles of Austria; 1590–1624
Philip IV of Spain; 1605–1665	Charles of Austria; 1607–1632	Ferdinand of Austria; 1609–1641	John-Charles of Austria; 1605–1619	Ferdinand III; HRE; 1608–1657	Leopold Wilhelm of Austria; 1614–1662	Ferdinand Charles; Archduke of Austria; 1628–1662	Sigismund Francis; Archduke of Austria; 1630–1665
Balthasar Charles; Prince of Asturias; 1629–1646	Charles II of Spain; 1661–1700	Ferdinand IV; King of the Romans; 1633–1654	Leopold I HRE; 1640–1705	Charles Joseph of Austria; 1649–1664
Joseph I HRE; 1678–1711	Charles VI; HRE; 1685–1740
Lorraine
Maria Theresa; HRE; 1740–1780	Francis I HRE; 1745–1765
Habsburg-Lorraine
Joseph II; HRE; 1765–1790	Leopold II; HRE; 1790–1792
Francis II; HRE; 1792–1806
