= Treaty of Kremmen =

1236 treaty between Pomerania and Brandenburg

The Treaty of Kremmen was signed on 20 June 1236 by Duke Wartislaw III of Pomerania, recognizing the seigniory of the Brandenburg margraves over his Duchy of Pomerania-Demmin, and ceding the terrae Stargard, Wustrow and Beseritz to Brandenburg.

== Background ==
After the Danish defeat at the 1227 Battle of Bornhöved, the Griffin dukes of Pomerania had lost their allies against the rising power of their Brandenburg neighbours in the south. In 1231 Emperor Frederick II had confirmed the seigniory of the Ascanian margraves John I and Otto III of Brandenburg. At the same time the Mecklenburg dukes campaigned the Circipane lands in the west, while the eastern territory of Schlawe-Stolp was occupied by Duke Swietopelk II of Pomerelia.

To ease the tensions with Brandenburg, Duke Wartislaw entered into the Kremmen agreement. He also stipulated the escheat (reversion) of his Pomeranian lands, would he die without heirs.
