= Otto V of Brandenburg-Salzwedel =

German margrave (c. 1246–1298)

Otto V, Margrave of Brandenburg-Salzwedel
- Born: c. 1246
- Died: 1298
- Noble family: House of Ascania
- Spouse: Judith of Henneberg-Coburg
- Issue: Matilda of Brandenburg, Duchess of Poland; Herman, Margrave of Brandenburg-Salzwedel; Otto; Kunigunde; Beatrice of Brandenburg; Judith; Albert
- Father: Otto III
- Mother: Beatrice of Bohemia

Margrave Otto V of Brandenburg-Salzwedel (c. 1246 – 1298), nicknamed Otto the Tall, was a son of Margrave Otto III and co-ruler of Brandenburg with his cousin, Margrave Otto IV.

Otto V spent many years in Prague, at the court of his maternal uncle King Ottokar II of Bohemia. When Ottokar died in battle in 1278, Otto V became the regent for Ottokar's son and heir Wenceslaus II, who was only seven years old when his father died. As regent, Otto V had to deal with the machinations of Ottokar's widow Kunigunda of Slavonia and with factions of powerful noblemen. Bohemian chroniclers describe Otto's persistent rigour and that Wenceslaus was forced to give up his claims on Upper Lusatia before he could start reigning himself. When Wenceslaus had taken over, he and Otto V were still on good terms, and Wenceslaus took measures against the strong influence of the group around his mother.

Otto V also persistently defended his claims on Pomerania against Polish counter-claims.

== Marriage and issue ==
He married with Judith of Henneberg-Coburg, a daughter of Count Herman I of Henneberg. They had the following children:

- Matilda (c. 1270 – before 1 June 1298), the second wife of Henry IV Probus, Duke of Wrocław and High Duke of Poland
- Herman (c. 1275 – 1 February 1308), his successor
- Otto (died 1307)
- Kunigunde (died 1317), never married
- Beatrix (d. c. 1316), married Bolko I the Strict, Duke of Świdnica in 1284
- Judith (also known as Jutta; died: 9 May 1328), married Rudolph I, Duke of Saxe-Wittenberg in 1303
- Albert (before 1283 – c. 1296)
