= Principality of Copnic =

- 12th century – 13th century
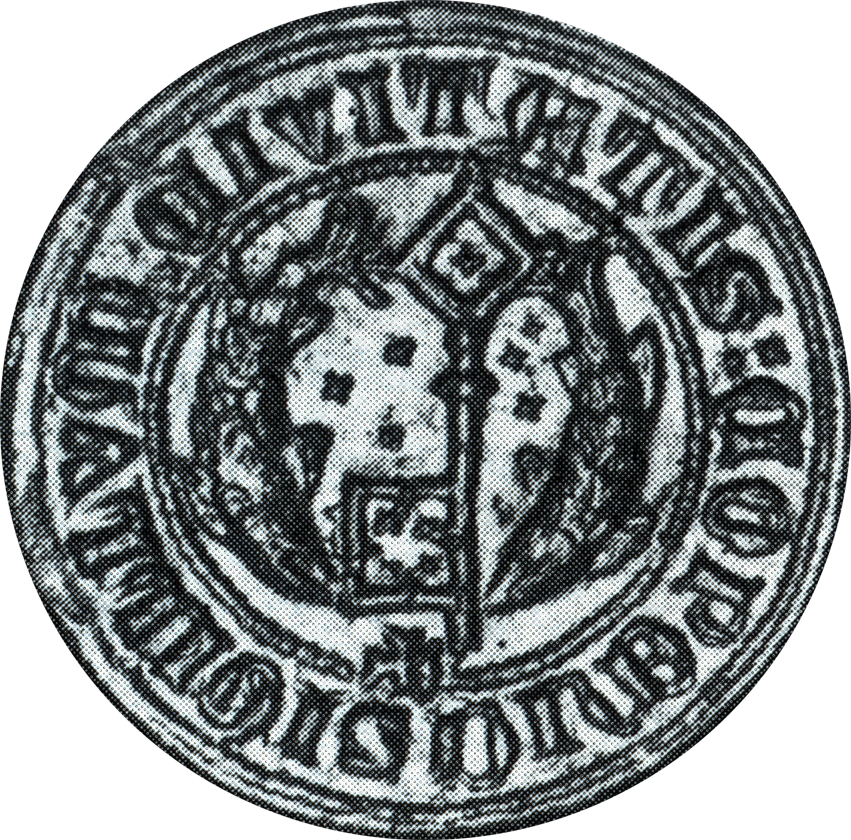
- Coat of arms

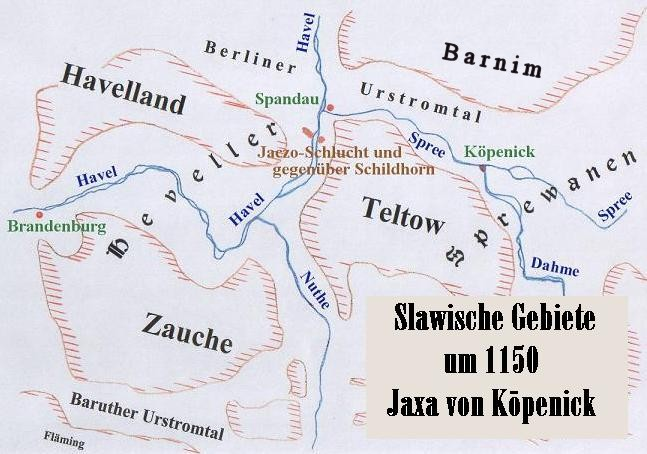
- Capital: Kopnik
- Common languages: Polabian, Latin
- Religion: Paganism, Christianity
- Government: Principality
- Historical era: Middle Ages
  - appeared: 12th century
  - ended: 13th century
Preceded by	Succeeded by
Sprevane	March of Lusatia / March of Lusatia
- Today part of: Germany

The Principality of Copnic (Principality of Kopanica; Polish: Księstwo Kopanickie; German: Fürstentum Köpenick) was a Slavonic principality in Central Europe in present-day central and eastern Brandenburg. Its seat of power was the castle and trade hub Copnic (German: Köpenick, today part of Berlin).

The principality appeared as a Christian entity in the early 12th century, from the Slavic Polabic tribe of the Sprevani. Its only ruler known by name was Jaksa of Kopanica. It is disputed if this Jacza is identical to the later Jaksa of Miechów (1120-1176) of the Gryfici (Świebodzice) noble clan, a knight of the Order of the Holy Sepulchre.

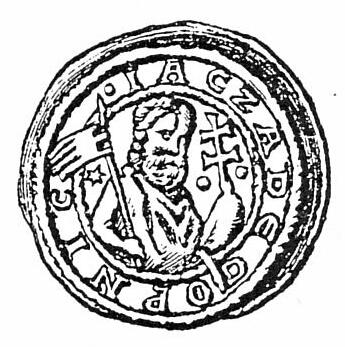
A bracteate of Jaksa de Copnic. The Patriarchal cross held by the figure suggests a Christian ruler.

The only surviving sources for the principality are bracteates showing the ruler Jaksa de Copnic titled as knes, a Slavic title meaning prince, and the Tractatus de Urbe Brandenburg, written in the early 13th century by Henry of Antwerp.

After losing the castle Brandenburg to Albrecht the Bear in battle in 1157, Jacza retreated to the Copnic.

In 1180, the margraviates of Lusatia would conquer the area from the Pomeranians. Finally in 1244, the region would be annexed to the Margraviate of Brandenburg.

== Etymology ==
The Slavic (Veneti) name Kopnik means a place at which some kind of digging related to irrigating, building, mining, also building a kopiec (kurhan, kurgan, tumulus, barrow, mound) is being performed. Kopanica means an area belonging to or surrounding the place of Kopnik. Kopa is the name often used for mountains, also the original Vindelici name for the main mountain massive hosting kopalnie (mines) of the Hallstatt culture.

Jaksa could be derived from the Slavic root iskati meaning to strike/split/sliver [stones], to make sparks/light, to glitter/shine and is related to such ancient names as Iskra (spark), Iškur (lord of the sparks/thunderbolts). Alternatively, Jaksa could be a Polabian variant of the Christian name Jacob.

== Geography ==
The territory of the Principality of Copnic consisted of central and eastern parts of modern day Brandenburg around the river Spree. In the late 12th century, in the west it bordered other territories of the Polabian Slavs, which were annexed into the Germanic Holy Roman Empire. In the east the Principality of Kopanica bordered the Kingdom of Poland.

== See also ==
- Polabian Slavs
- Polabian language
