= Jaxa of Köpenick =

Prince of Copnic

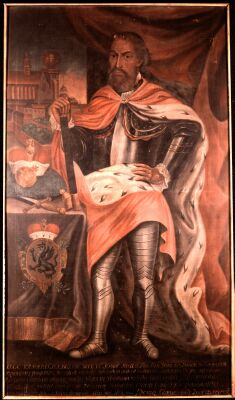
- Imaginative portrait of Jaksa of Kopanica from the Norbertine monastery in Zwierzyniec, 1757
- Born: 12th century
- Died: after 1176

Jaxa of Köpenick, also known as Jaksa of Kopanica or Jaksa of Miechów (Polish: Jaksa z Kopanicy or Jaksa z Miechowa; died after 1176) was a Polish noble, the prince of the Sprevane and Stodoranen, and the ruler of Copnic. He was an opponent of Albert the Bear during the formation of Brandenburg in 1157.

Jaxa was one of the most powerful Polish magnates of the second half of the twelfth century. He was the son-in-law of Piotr Włostowic and possessed numerous estates in Poland. As a prince of the Sprevane, he controlled Brenna, the capital of the Stodoranen, for several years, contesting it with Albert the Bear. He lost Brenna in 1157 and exercised authority from Copnic. In 1162 he undertook a pilgrimage to Jerusalem, from where he brought the Canons Regular of the Holy Sepulchre to Miechów. In 1167 he participated in a rebellion against Bolesław IV the Curly. After the death of his only son, he founded numerous ecclesiastical institutions. He died after 1176.

In historiography there was a long-standing debate regarding Jaxa's identity, since in historical sources it was possible to distinguish several figures bearing the same name and having similar biographies (the son-in-law of Piotr Włostowic, the founder of the Holy Sepulchre monastery in Miechów, the prince of the Sprevane and Stodoranen, and others). Currently, the view with the most supporters is that these all are one and the same person.

== Biography ==
=== Origins and family ===
Jaxa appears in several twelfth-century sources, most often described as dominus. The first mention of a magnate bearing this name occurs in a charter issued by Duke Bolesław IV the Curly on 23 June 1149 for the Ołbin monastery near Wrocław: comitibus autem domino Jaxa, Michora, Clemente, Vrotis, Theodoro et Crisano.

Neither the name nor the exact social status of Jaxa's father is known. In later tradition, however, he was ascribed a distinguished lineage. According to the Greater Poland Chronicle, written at the end of the thirteenth century, he was a descendant of Leszek III, prince of the Lechites. According to the fifteenth-century annalist Jan Długosz, he was a descendant of the Sorbian princes. Somewhat more is known about his mother: according to some scholars, she was Przybysława, the sister of the Stodoran prince Przybysław Henryk.

The first known fact from his life is his marriage in 1145 to Agapia (Agatha), also known as Beatrice, the daughter of the great Polish magnate Piotr Włostowic. She brought him as a dowry numerous estates in Silesia, Greater Poland, and Lesser Poland, including Miechów, which became the center of his domains. As a result, Jaxa became one of the most powerful lords in the kingdom, especially after the death of his father-in-law in 1153, working closely with his son Świętosław.

Jaxa and Agafia had an unnamed son, who died in 1158 at the court of the Bohemian king Vladislav II as a hostage, as well as three daughters. One of them married Frederick II, the vogt of Slaztwedel; another married the voivode Mikołaj; and the third, known by name as Anna, became the abbess of the Norbertine convent in Zwierzyniec founded by Jaksa. A different view is presented by Marek Cetwiński, according to whom Jaxa's sons were the successive patrons of the Ołbin monastery: Piotr, Włodzimierz, and Leonard.

=== Rule in Copnic and war for Brenna ===
It is not known when or under what circumstances Jaxa became the prince of the Sprewian tribe, settled on both banks of the lower Spree, nor whether he ruled them in his own right or as a vassal of the Polish duke Bolesław IV the Curly. Polish authority had been extended during the reign of Bolesław the Wrymouth over the entire Lubusz Land, which therefore directly bordered the Principality of Copnic. The overlordship of the bishop of Lubusz, whose diocese was also founded by the Wrymouth in 1123/24, probably extended to Köpenick as well. The Polish princes initiated the process of colonization of the Lubusz region toward the west. Johannes Schultze put forward the thesis that Jaxa may have taken control of the Spree region during the Polish crusade against the Polabian Slavs.

Archaeological research indicates that the large complex built around the year 1000 on the castle island in Köpenick still existed in the mid-12th century, when it underwent a significant reconstruction. This seat encompassed the entire island, which corresponds to analogous structures of this type in Poland. According to Joachim Herrmann, this castle was built by Poland or with Poland’s assistance during Bolesław the Brave’s campaigns in the Polabian lands, during which he extended his authority over this region.

According to Herbert Ludat, the extent of Jaxa’s power spread widely, encompassing the entire territories of Teltow and Barnim. However, according to Joachim Herrmann, archaeological evidence clearly indicates that his authority was limited to the plain around the confluence of the Dahme and the Spree rivers and their surrounding areas. Under his rule were also the strongholds of Pennigsberg (near Mittenwalde) and Zossen in Teltow.

The principal source for the history of Jaxa's rule in the Polabian region is the work of Henry of Antwerp, prior of the Premonstratensian monastery in Brandenburg, Tractatus de captione urbis Brandenburg, which describes the capture of Brenna by Albert the Bear. It was probably written still in the 12th century or at the beginning of the following century; thus, the author may have been a direct witness to the events described. After the death of Pribislav Henry, ruler of Brenna, his wife Petryssa concealed the fact of his death for three days, awaiting the arrival of Albrecht's forces, who indeed soon took possession of Brenna against the will of the local population. According to Henry of Antwerp, Jaxa, then exercising ducal authority in Poland (Iaxzonis in Polonia tunc principantis) and a kinsman (avunculus) of the deceased, upon learning of this event hastened as quickly as possible to Brenna, arrived at the head of a Polish army (cum magno exercitu Polonorum), and seized the city, taking captives to Poland (in Poloniam ducens). These events are dated to the period after 1150. Albert did not give up and laid siege to Brenna, which capitulated on 11 June 1157, while Jaxa withdrew to Köpenick. Much indicates that Jaxa’s rule over Brenna lasted quite a long time, since for the period 1150–1157 there are no documents by Albert mentioning Brenna, whereas immediately after its capture in 1157 he included it in his titulature.

The capture of the town is generally regarded as the beginning of the Margraviate of Brandenburg.

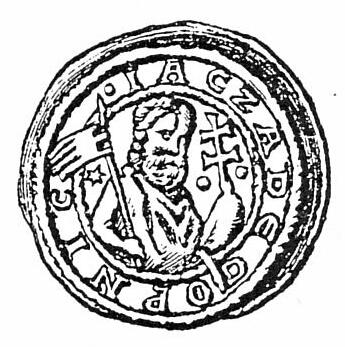
A bracteate of Jacza de Copnic. The cross held by the figure suggests a Christian ruler.

Jaxa issued his own coins, bracteates, bearing the legends “IAC KES” and “IAKZA COPTNIK CNE,” which are commonly interpreted as “Jaksa knez” and “Jaksa knez of Copnic,” respectively. These coins are exceptional, as they constitute virtually the only known case of a West Slavic ruler minting coinage with a title expressed in the vernacular rather than in Latin. According to Piotr Boroń, the reason for this peculiarity may have been a deliberate attempt to not offend or to enter into conflict with the Polish dukes, who were Jaxa's suzerains and who alone were entitled to use the title “dux,” whereas the native term “knez” had a much broader usage and was effectively synonymous with “lord.” This is indirectly corroborated by the charter of Bolesław the Chaste from 1252, in which he confirmed the possessions of the monastery at Sieciechów, part of which, according to the wording of the document, had been granted by “Jaxa, who was called duke” (a Iacza qui cognominatus erat dux). Jaksa is also described as dux in the necrology of the monastery at Ołbin and in that of Doksany. It is also possible that this was influenced by the fact that, in the same period, Albert the Bear began minting coins with the inscriptions “Brandenburg” and “Marchio.” On the one hand, Jaxa may have wished to present himself as an equal ruler; on the other, he avoided elevating himself above the margrave by using the title “dux,” which occupied a higher position in the hierarchy.

The coins were most likely issued after the loss of Brenna in 1157, since otherwise that stronghold would probably have appeared in the titulature. One of the coin issues also features the motif of a palm branch, a symbol of a pilgrim to Jerusalem, and it is known that Jaxa undertook such a pilgrimage in 1162. On some of his coins, Jaxa is depicted with an uncovered head and a long beard, holding a double patriarchal cross, which, according to some scholars, indicates his joining the confraternity of the Canons Regular of the Holy Sepulchre after bringing them to Miechów. The double cross was a symbol of the brotherhood.

Coins bearing the image of Jaxa are found not only along the Elbe but also in the territory of Poland, in Silesia, Kuyavia, and Pomerania.

=== Activity in Poland ===
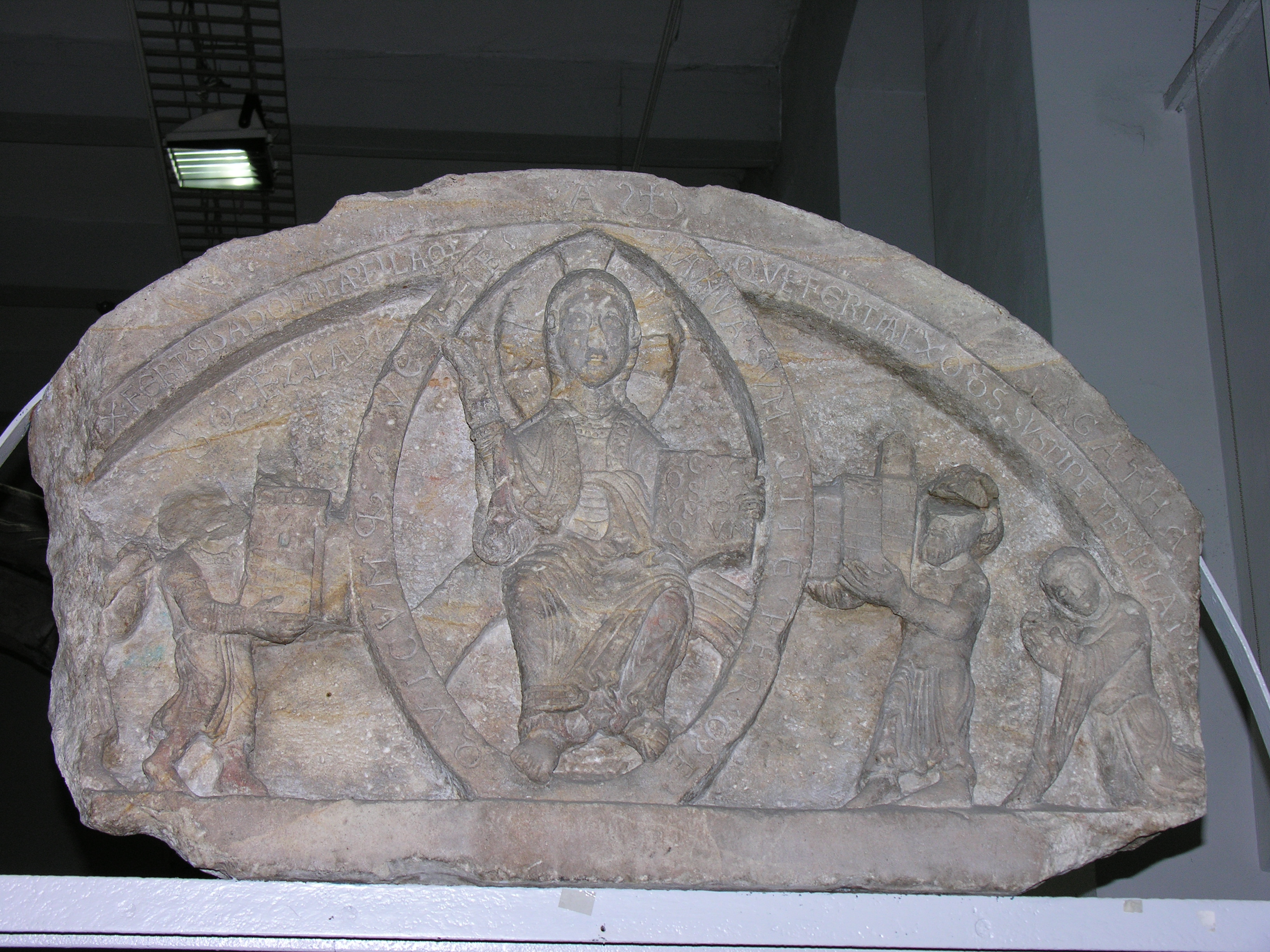
The foundation tympanum from the Church of St. Michael in the monastery at Ołbin in Wrocław. On the tympanum, alongside the figures of Jaxa, Bolesław the Curly, and his son Leszek, Jaxa's wife is also depicted, whose name is engraved in Cyrillic. The inscription reads: Ad hanc novellam dux fert sua dona capellam / Que fert Jacxo, Deus suscipe templa (“To this new chapel the Duke brings his gifts / Accept, O God, the temple which Jaxa brings”).

Jaxa was active in Polish politics and took part in assemblies of dignitaries at Jędrzejów and Łęczyca in 1153, again at Łęczyca in 1161, at Jędrzejów and Wkryujście in 1168, and also at Milica in 1172. Together with his brother-in-law Świętosław, he participated in the rebellion of 1167 against the rule of Bolesław the Curly in support of his younger brother, Casimir the Just.

In 1162 Jaxa undertook a pilgrimage to Jerusalem, where he likely did not participate in any significant military engagements. However, he certainly met with the Jerusalem Patriarch Amalric of Nesle, who granted permission for the foundation of a monastery of the Canons Regular of the Holy Sepulchre in Miechów, which belonged to Jaxa. This is confirmed in a document of Patriarch Aymar the Monk from 1198, which mentions that Jaxa (dominus Iaczo), with the consent of his lord Bolesław, granted the monks three villages: Miechów, Zagorzyce, and Komorów. According to tradition, Jaxa brought back from the Holy Land a fragment of the True Cross, as well as four sacks of soil from the region (in another version, a reliquary box containing soil trodden by Jesus Christ), and also a French monk named Marcin Gallus, nicknamed “the Camel.”

Miechów was only one of the foundations attributed to Jaxa. According to Jan Długosz, he also founded the Norbertine monastery in Zwierzyniec. The Zwierzyniec monastery was a filial monastery of the one in Doksany, of which Jaxa was a donor and maintained with it close ties.

He is likewise credited with founding the Norbertine monastery in Krzyżanowice. Jaxa was also a benefactor of the Benedictine monastery in Sieciechów and the builder of the Church of St. Michael in Wrocław, whose construction was completed by his widow Agapia. According to Marian Gumowski, he may also have been a patron of the establishment of the Templar commandery in Tempelhof.

=== Death ===
Jaxa most likely died in the 1170s. Various necrologies record the date as 26 February, 27 February, or 20 March. According to the Chronicle of the Kraków Chapter, he died in 1176, although it may in fact have occurred a few years later. It is also difficult to determine where he was buried, with two locations most commonly considered: the Church of St. Michael in Wrocław or the monastery in Miechów.

It may be assumed that his principality on the Spree continued to exist after his death at least until around 1200, when this territory was conquered by Margrave Conrad II of Lusatia. At that time, the strongholds of Pennigsberg and Copnic were also burned.

== Historical identification ==
The exact identity of Jaxa of Köpenick, the leader of the Slavic revolt, has been subject of dispute, partly because there might have been several individuals with the unusual name "Jaxa" (or its variants) alive at the time. This is complicated by the fact that it is also not clear whether Jaxa was a pagan or if he had converted to Christianity. While Jaxa led a pagan revolt, some sources claim that he himself was a Christian, having converted through the Polish Bishopric of Lebus. Likewise the coins issued by a Jacza de Copnic show a ruler holding a cross, however it is not clear that Jacza and Jaxa were the same person, although undoubtedly both were associated with Köpenick. Other sources on the other hand refer to Jaxa as a pagan or a heathen.

The Polish numismatist Marian Gumowski identified Jaxa with a Polish noble from Lesser Poland, Jaksa of Miechów, who in 1145 married a daughter of Piotr Włostowic, the castellan of Wrocław and palatyn to Polish Duke Bolesław Wrymouth. According to this version Jaxa/Jaksa did not become prince of Stodorans until 1154. If the identification is correct then Jaxa's death can be placed at around 1176. Marek Cetwiński also identified Jaxa, prince of Kopenick, with Jaksa of Miechów. According to this thesis Jaksa's coins could have been fabricated at silver mines of Rozbark and Bytom.

This thesis has been disputed by other scholars, for example the Polish historian Gerard Labuda, who argued that the two were distinct persons. In this Labuda followed the Polish Renaissance chronicler Jan Długosz who had posited that there were in fact three different Jaxas alive during this period. Currently, the view with the most supporters is that these all are one and the same person.

== Commemoration ==
A monument for him can be found on the Schildhorn peninsula in the Havel.

== Bibliography ==
- Boroń, Piotr (2010). Kniaziowie, królowie, carowie... Tytuły i nazwy władców słowiańskich we wczesnym średniowieczu. Katowice.
- Cetwiński, Marek (1982). Rycerstwo śląskie do końca XIII w. Biogramy i rodowody (in Polish). Wrocław.
- Herrmann, Joachim (1962). Köpenick: Ein Beitrag zur Frühgeschichte Gross-Berlins. Berlin.
- Kała, Damian (2011). "Książę Jaksa z XII wieku – wymowa źródeł a historiografia" [Prince Jaksa in the 12th Century – The Wording of the Sources and Historiography] (PDF). Meritum. 3.
- Lindner, Michael (2012). Jacza von Köpenick. Ein Slawenfürst des 12. Jahrhunderts zwischen dem Reich und Polen. Geschichten aus einer Zeit, in der es Berlin noch nicht gab [Jacza of Köpenick: A Slavic Prince of the 12th Century between the Empire and Poland. Stories from a Time When Berlin Did Not Yet Exist] (in German). Berlin.
