= Jaxa (disambiguation) =

JAXA is Japan's national space agency.

Jaxa or JAXA may also refer to:

== Places ==
- 100267 JAXA, minor planet
- Jaxa (state), 17th century state in North Asia

== People ==
- Jaxa of Köpenick, German prince
- Jaxa Gryfita, Polish crusader
- Tina Jaxa, South African actress
- Ricardo de Jaxa Malachowski, Polish-Peruvian architect

=== Fictional characters ===
- Sito Jaxa, minor Star Trek character
