= Georg Kössler =

German politician

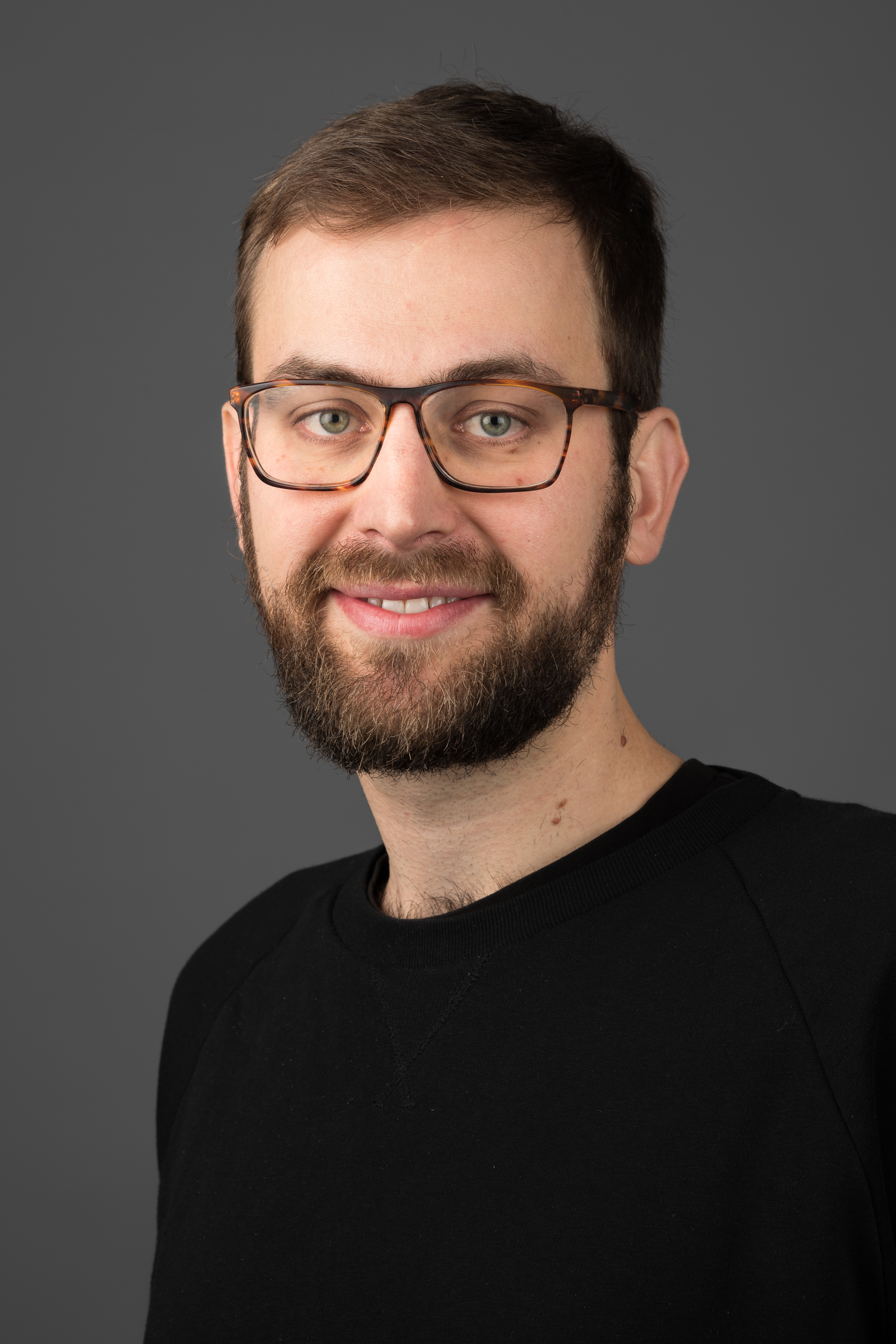
- Kössler in 2017

Member of the Abgeordnetenhaus of Berlin
- Incumbent
- Assumed office 27 October 2016
- Constituency: State-wide list

Personal details
- Born: 21 December 1984 (age 41) East Berlin, East Germany
- Party: Alliance 90/The Greens
- Occupation: Politician

Georg Kössler (born 21 December 1984) is Political Director of Greenpeace Germany. Until 2021, he served as Member of the Abgeordnetenhaus of Berlin since the 2016 election as a statewide member representing Alliance 90/The Greens and the district Berlin-Neukölln 3.

== Personal life and education ==
Tomiak was born in Berlin and grew up in Köpenick. He completed his secondary education at the Alexander-von-Humboldt-Gymnasium. He then studied political science at University of Erlangen-Nuremberg and completed his diploma at the Free University of Berlin. From 2011-2012 he was a Research Fellow at the Heinrich Böll Foundation.

== Career ==
At the 2016 election Kössler contested the Neukölln 3 constituency for The Greens and received 21.7% of the vote but was defeated by Joschka Langenbrinck of the SPD. He was, however, elected as a statewide list member.

Kössler is especially involved in climate and environmental activism and is a keen cyclist. He serves as the Green group spokesperson for Climate and Environmental Protection and Club Culture.

Kössler is the Spokesperson for the Greens Federal Energy Working Group, a role he has served in since 2012.
