= Hevelli =

Slavic ethnic group

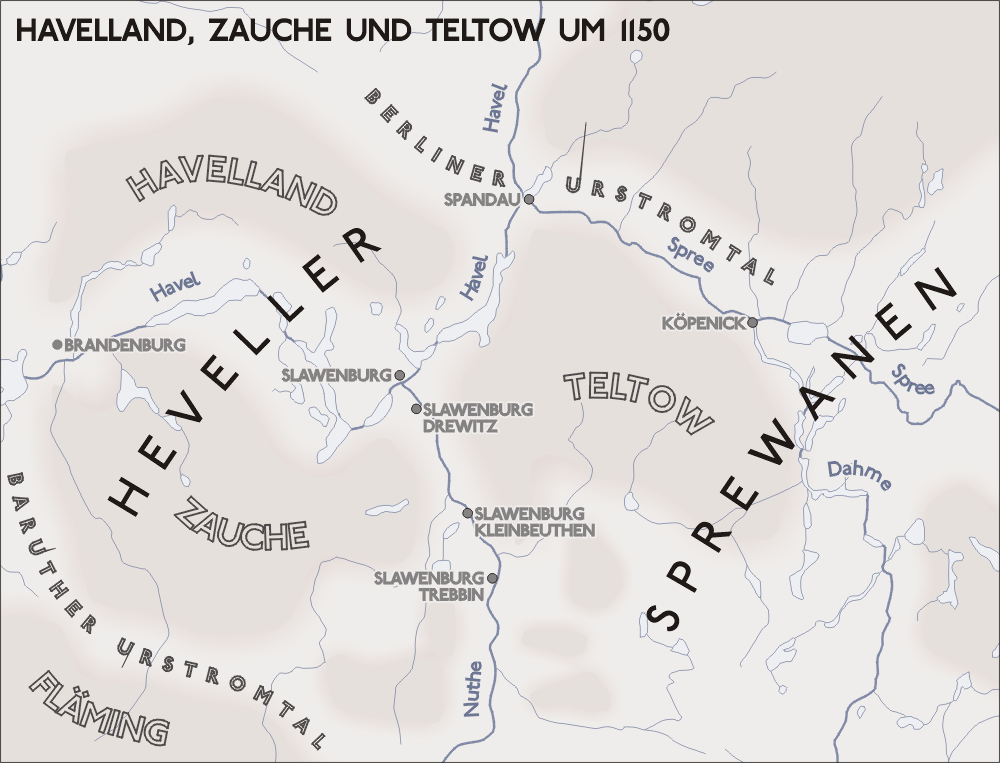
Lands of the Hevelli and Sprevane, about 1150

The Hevelli or Hevellians/ Navellasîni (sometimes Havolane; German: Heveller or Stodoranen; Polish: Hawelanie or Stodoranie; Czech: Havolané or Stodorané) were a tribe of the Polabian Slavs, who settled around the middle Havel river in the present-day Havelland region of Brandenburg in eastern Germany from the 8th century onwards.

West Slavic tribes ("Wends") had settled in the Germania Slavica region from the 7th century onwards. The Hehfeldi as they were called by the Bavarian Geographer about 850 built their main fortification at Brenna (later to become Brandenburg an der Havel) and a large eastern outpost at the current site of Spandau. In 906 the Hevelli princess Drahomíra married the Přemyslid duke Vratislaus I of Bohemia. Baçlabič was the prince of Hevelli from 921-936, succeeded by Tugumir.

Brenna was occupied by the German king Henry the Fowler in his 928/29 Slavic campaign and incorporated into the Marca Geronis. Henry's successor Otto I in 948 established the Bishopric of Brandenburg in order to Christianize the pagan population. These efforts were aborted in the course of the 983 Great Slav Rising in the Northern March, which again defied German control over the region. Together with the neighbouring Sprevane in the east, the Hevelli waged war against not only the German Saxon forces to the west, but also other Slavic tribes.

The baptized Hevelli prince Pribislav (died 1150) finally bequested his lands to the Ascanian count Albert the Bear. Albert until 1157 could re-conquer the territory of the former Northern March, whereafter he established the Margraviate of Brandenburg. The Slavic Hevelli were gradually assimilated by German settlers in the course of the Ostsiedlung.

== See also ==
- List of medieval Slavic tribes

== Sources ==
- Barkowski, Robert F. (2015). Słowianie połabscy: Dzieje zagłady. Warszawa: Bellona.
- Bachrach, Bernard S.; Bachrach, David S., eds. (2014). Widukind of Corvey: Deeds of the Saxons. Washington: The Catholic University of America Press.
- Rotter, Ekkehart; Schneidmüller, Bernd, eds. (1981). Widukind von Corvey: Res gestae Saxonicae: Die Sachsengeschichte. Stuttgart: Reclam.
- Stone, Gerald (2016). Slav Outposts in Central European History: The Wends, Sorbs and Kashubs. London and New York: Bloomsbury Academic.
