= Baçlabič =

- Prince of Hevelli
- Reign: 921–936
- Successor: Tugumir
- Died: 936
- Spouse: unknown
- Issue: Tugumir (maybe) unknown son unknown daughter
- Father: Boleslaw Hevelli Stodoransky - prince of Hevelli

Baçlabič (Václav) (died 936) was a prince of the Hevelli. He was possibly the father of Tugumir and an unknown concubine of Otto I the Great, and the brother of Drahomíra of Stodor.
