= Jaksa Gryfita =

Medieval możnowładca (magnate)

Jaksa Gryfita, Jaksa z Miechowa or Jaxa Gryfita (1120–1176) of the Gryfici family was a medieval możnowładca (magnate) in Lesser Poland, crusader and fundator of the Monastery of the Holy Sepulchre in Miechów, son-in-law of Piotr Włostowic.

According to some historians this is the same person as Jaxa of Köpenick (Jaksa z Kopanicy), Prince of the Sprevane.

== Bibliography ==
- A. Małecki, Studya heraldyczne, t. II, Lwów 1890, s. 59−64.
- G. Labuda, Jaksa z Kopanicy – Jaksa z Miechowa, Polski słownik biograficzny, t. X, Wrocław 1962-1964, s. 339–341.
- L. M. Wójcik, Ród Gryfitów do końca XIII wieku. Pochodzenie — genealogia — rozsiedlenie, "Historia" CVII, Wrocław 1993, s. 12–23.
- S. Wrzesiński, Polscy krzyżowcy. Tajemnice średniowiecznych krucjat, Warszawa 2007.
