= Mellowpark =

Sportpark in Berlin, Germany

Mellow Park
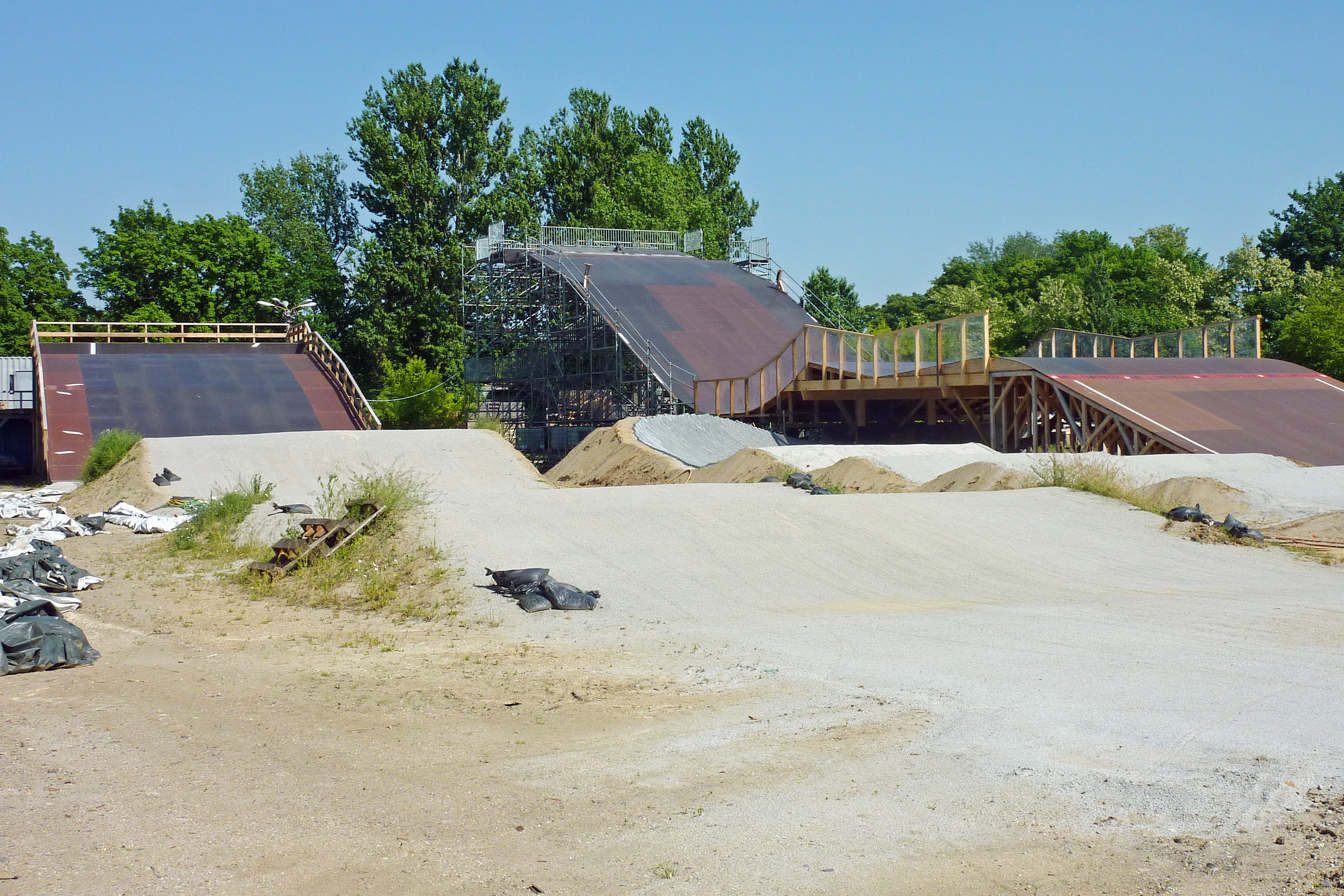
- Mellowpark Rampen Berlin-Obers-2014 1443-1323-120
- Interactive map of Mellow Park
- Type: Outdoor Skate Park
- Location: Köpenick, Berlin
- Coordinates: 52°27′20.69″N 13°33′50.85″E
- Area: 2.5 acres (1.0 ha)
- Created: 2001
- Operator: All eins e.V.
- Visitors: 20 thousand (to y. 2008)
- Status: At new place reopened in y. 2012

The Mellowpark in Berlin is Europe's biggest outdoor sportpark for skateboarder and for BMX biker.

== Details ==
| hectare | yearly visitors | publisher |
|---|---|---|
| 1 | 20.000 | All eins e.v. |

== History ==
The "All 1" moved to an old cable factory in 1999 when its previous site at the "Allende Viertel" was redeveloped for housing. It was planned as a sports and teens project and won the 1999 & 2000 city contest "Teens Build the New Berlin" (Jugend entwicklet das neue Berlin).

Mellowpark grew very fast and is now the biggest Outdoor Skaterpark in Europe. To the year 2008 the park was used by more than 20,000 people a year. The Youth Welfare Office sponsored Mellowpark with over €75,000 (USD $115,000) annually. The Berner Group, a private investor, bought the place next to Mellowpark and planned a project for loft apartments. The Berner Group wanted Mellowpark to be closed as few people would want to live next to a skatepark.

In June 2008, after two demonstrations and a year-long petition collection, the City of Berlin decided that Mellowpark would close on December 31, 2008. Later that month, the City of Berlin announced Mellowpark would be moved to a new location, opposite the football stadium of 1. FC Union Berlin and the river Spree, address: An der Wuhlheide.

The new Mellowpark was opened in August 2012 with the event "Highway to Hill 2012".

== Events ==
| 2001 | 2002 | 2003 | 2004 | 2005 | 2006 | 2007 | 2008 |
|---|---|---|---|---|---|---|---|
| "Mellowpark Jam" "Highway to Hill" "BMX Dirt Contest" "BMX Lake Jump Contest" | "Highway to Hill" "Mellowpark Jam" "European King of Dirt" "Crossroads Streetjam" "Beach Party @ Mellowpark" "Ready to Rock Streetjam" "Presentation of futurevisions / Designing of the Project Mellowpark" | "Road*Star BMX-Jam" "Red Bull Local Hero Tour" "Highway to Hill" "Carnival of the Cultures" "Bin Baden - BMX Lake Jump Contest" "Mellowpark Jam" "European King of Dirt" "Crossroads Streetjam" "GERMAN OPEN - German BMX Championship" "Beatheadz" | "Road*Star BMX-Jam" "Highway to Hill" "B-Berlin Open" "Red Bull Local Hero Tour" "The big eating" "Ladiez First" "Berlin City Games - Palast der Republik" | "Road*Star BMX-Jam" "Carnival of the Cultures" "Highway to Hill" "Mellowpark Jam" "rebeljam - unfiltered bmx" "Ladiez 1st" "Globe Skateboard Team @ Mellowpark" "kidsfestival" "Berlin City Games - Dresdener Bahnhof" | "Ladiez 1st" "Highway to Hill" "Carnival of the Cultures" "Marshmellow Jam" "Final Mellowpark Soccer League" "Red Bull Local Hero Tour" "Three Amigos Skateboard Contest" "rebeljam - unfiltered bmx" "Berlin City Games - Parochialkirche" | "highway to hill" "c.o.s cup" "kidsfestival" "rebeljam" "marshmellow jam" "DRAGONFESTIVAL" | "Highway to Hill" "SUMMERCLASH" "Family meets Mellowp" "GERMAN OPEN" |

== Partners/Sponsors ==
Sponsors

- Eastpak
- Felt Bicycles
- Adidas
- Titus
- Carhartt
- Red Bull

Partners

- 030 magazin of Berlin
- Audio
- Berlin Massive
- Best Sabel Touristikakademie
- Cafe HdJK (Café im Haus der Jugend Köpenick)
- Deutsche Kinder- und Jugendstiftung
- Fatbmx
- Fine Lines
- Gsub
- Messe Berlin
- Musicmediapark
- Praxis-Nah e.V.
- Roof BMX
- Star.FM
- Uncle Sally's

== See also ==
- Sport in Berlin
