= Köpenick =

- Quarter of Berlin
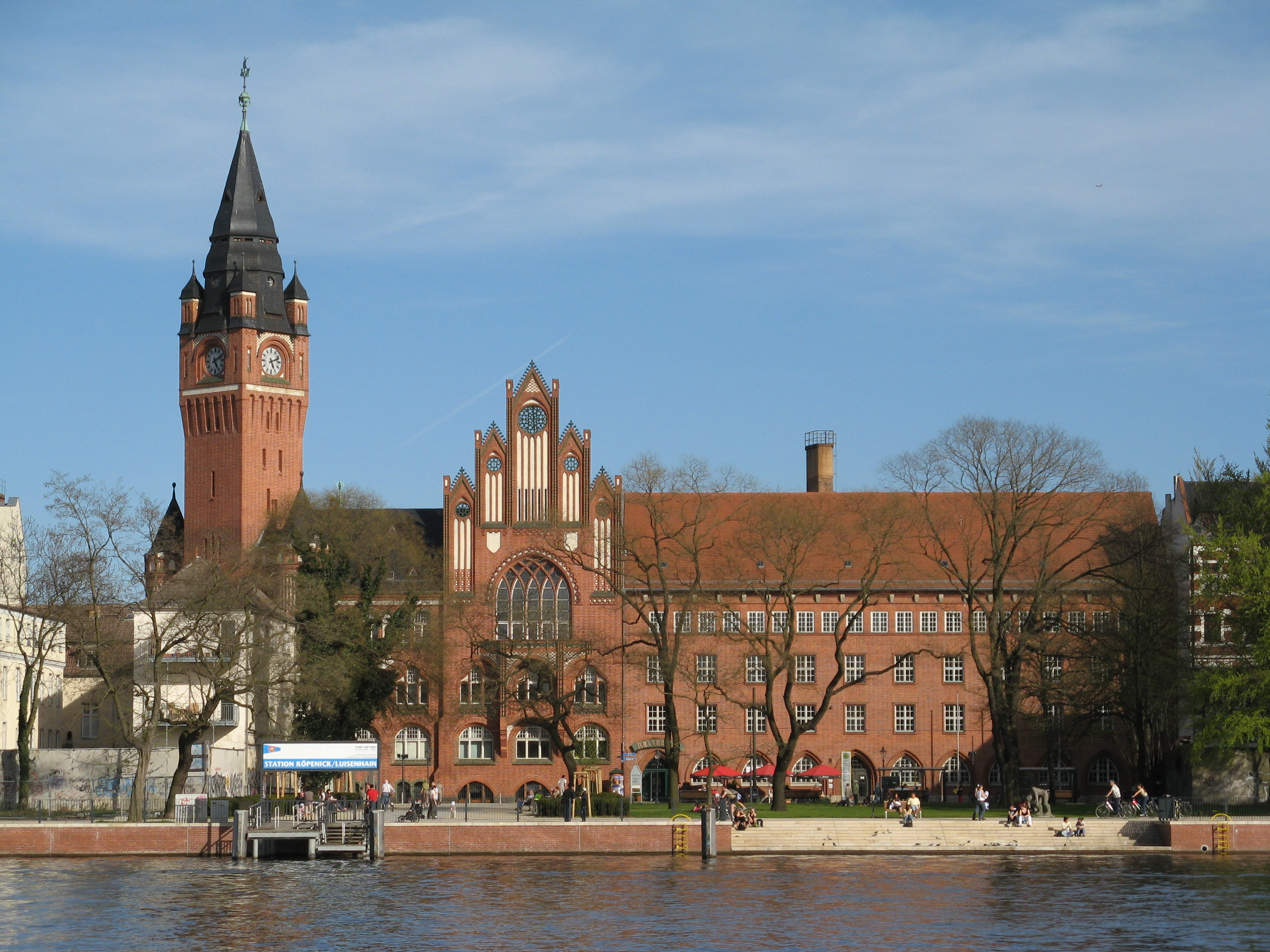
- Town hall on Dahme river

- Flag Coat of arms

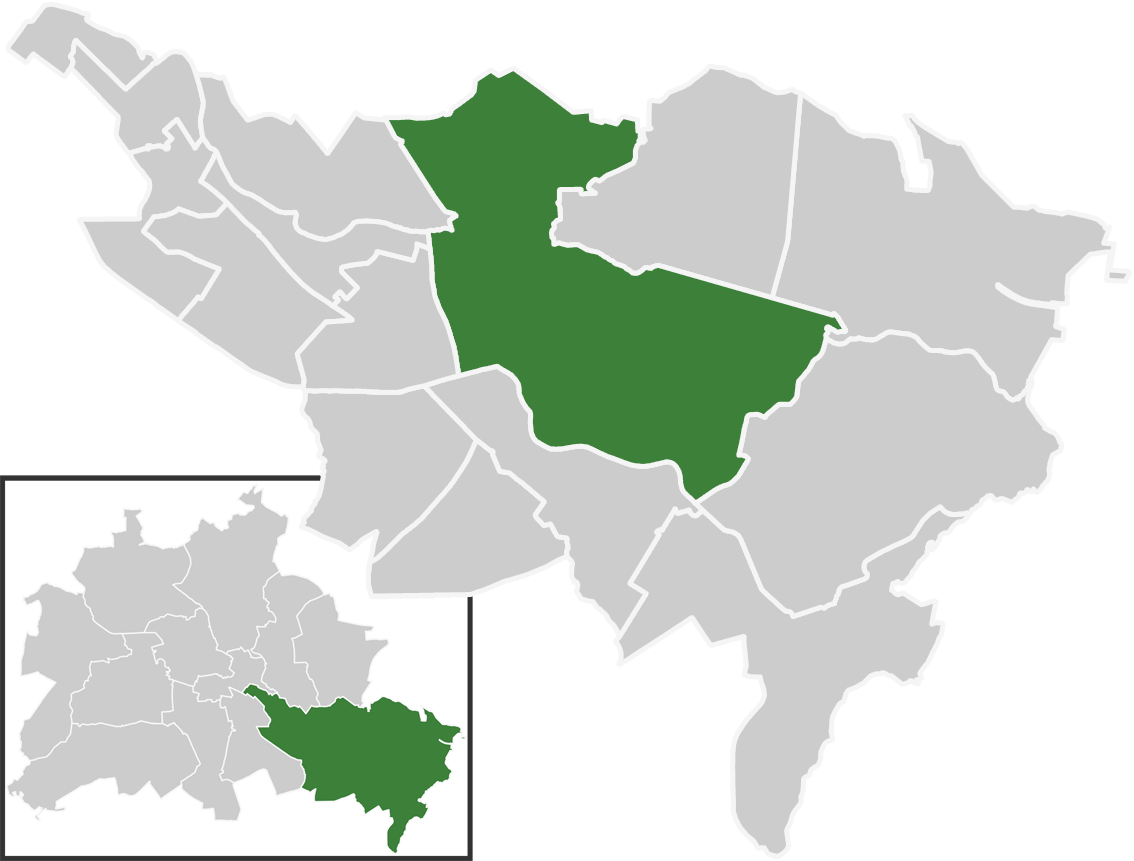
- Location of Köpenick in Treptow-Köpenick and Berlin
- Interactive map of Köpenick
- Location within Germany Location within Berlin
- Coordinates: 52°26′45″N 13°34′38″E
- Country: Germany
- State: Berlin
- City: Berlin
- Borough: Treptow-Köpenick
- Founded: 1232
- Subdivisions: 8 zones

Area
  - Total: 34.9 km^{2} (13.5 sq mi)
- Elevation: 34–115 m (112–377 ft)

Population (2024-12-31)
  - Total: 71,366
  - Density: 2,040/km^{2} (5,300/sq mi)
- Time zone: UTC+01:00 (CET)
  - Summer (DST): UTC+02:00 (CEST)
- Postal codes: 12459, 12555, 12557, 12559, 12587
- Vehicle registration: B
- Website: koepenick.net

Köpenick (German pronunciation: [ˈkøːpənɪk]) is a historic locality (Ortsteil) in Berlin, situated at the confluence of the rivers Dahme and Spree in the southeast of the German capital. It was formerly known as Copanic and then Cöpenick, only officially adopting the current spelling in 1931.

Prior to its incorporation into Berlin in 1920, Köpenick had been an independent town. It then became a borough of Berlin, and with an area of 128 km^{2} (49 sq mi), Berlin's largest. As a result of Berlin's 2001 administrative reform, the borough of Köpenick was merged with that of Treptow to create the current borough of Treptow-Köpenick.

Köpenick is home to the Bundesliga football club 1. FC Union Berlin, who play at the Stadion An der Alten Försterei. Mellowpark, the largest outdoor skatepark in Europe, is located in the town. Köpenick is also known for the imposter Hauptmann von Köpenick.

== Geography ==
=== Overview ===
A large percentage of Köpenick's surface area is made up of pine forests and expanses of water like lake Müggelsee, which is why it is often referred to as the "green lungs" of Berlin (Grüne Lunge Berlins). The Müggelberge hills in the south-east of Köpenick reach 115 m (377 ft), making them the highest natural point of Berlin.

The historic town lies in the center of the Berlin Urstromtal meltwater valley, on an island at the confluence of the Dahme and Spree rivers. The original island had been separated by two channelisation ditches, the Katzengraben and the Schlossgraben, into what are now the three islands Baumgarteninsel (plantation island), Old Town and Schlossinsel (palace island), on which the eponymous Köpenick Palace is located. The Katzengraben is now the main navigable branch of the Spree, transecting the old river bend north of the Old Town.

The Spree links Köpenick with lake Müggelsee and inner Berlin, and further via the Havel and Elbe rivers with the North Sea. The Oder–Spree Canal links the Dahme, at nearby Schmöckwitz, with the Oder river, at Eisenhüttenstadt, thus providing a navigable connection between Köpenick, the Oder and thus the Baltic Sea.

=== Neighborhoods ===
Köpenick comprises nine neighborhoods:

- The old town (Altstadt)
- Kietzer Vorstadt
- Dammvorstadt
- The North (Köpenick-Nord) with:
  - Siedlung Dammfeld
  - Elsengrund
  - Uhlenhorst
  - Wolfsgarten
- Amtsfeld and Kämmereiheide with:
  - Salvador-Allende-Viertel
- Köllnische Vorstadt
- Spindlersfeld
- Wendenschloß
- Kietzer Feld

=== Panorama ===
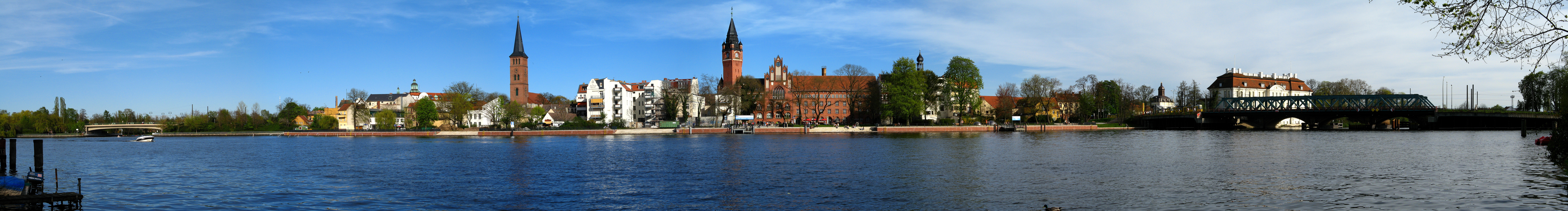
The Old Town with views of St. Laurence (left), town hall (center) and palace (right) from the opposite bank of the Dahme in Spindlersfeld

== History ==
Historical affiliations

Duchy of Kopanica 12th century–c. 1180
March of Lusatia c.1180-1210
Margraviate of Meißen 1210-1245
Margraviate of Brandenburg 1245–1356
Electorate of Brandenburg 1356–1373
Kingdom of Bohemia 1373–1415
Electorate of Brandenburg 1415–1701
Kingdom of Prussia 1701–1871
German Empire 1871–1918
Weimar Republic 1918–1933
Nazi Germany 1933–1945
Allied-occupied Germany 1945–1949
German Democratic Republic 1949–1990
Federal Republic of Germany 1990–present

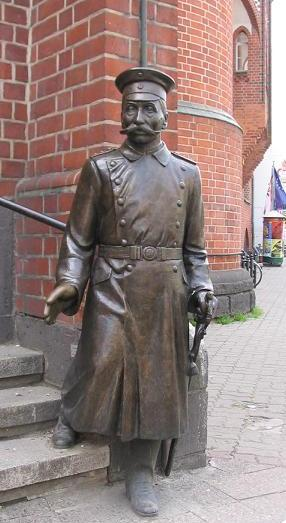
Statue of "Captain" Wilhelm Voigt

While its origins are shrouded in mystery, Köpenick has had a long history as an independent town. In the 12th century, it was the residence of a Slavic prince, Jaxa of Köpenick. By this time, it had probably been settled by Lechitic tribes for about 400 years. After Jaxa's death, the principality was reigned by the dukes of Pomerania. While Albert the Bear had taken the Slavic city of Brenna in 1157, which was renamed Brandenburg, and thus formed the nucleus of what would eventually become the synonymous margraviate, the area around Köpenick was conquered from the south and thus initially became part of the March of Lusatia.

While Jaxa's bracteates or hollow pennies are coined with the impression "Iaczo de Copnic", in written history, Köpenick first appeared in a deed dated 12 February 1210 and issued under the seal of Margrave Conrad II of Lusatia, which contains the reference "Acta sunt hec ad Copnic". 1210 is also the year when on Conrad's death power in the principality transited to the Margraviate of Meißen and the House of Wettin. Köpenick was afforded town privileges by 1232, and German colonization commenced.

Köpenick may therefore be considered one of the oldest settlements in the Margraviate of Brandenburg, predating Spandau, Berlin and Cölln, which was first mentioned in a 1237 deed. For the most part of its history, the town was known as Cöp(e)nick.

The old Cöpenick consisted of three distinct parts that co-existed for centuries on the three banks of the Frauentog, a bight in the river Dahme: the castle with its garrison, the German-settled town of artisans, peasants and merchants, and the for still some time Sorbic-speaking Kietz, a hamlet containing the fishermen.

The castle was conquered by the Ascanian margraves John I and Otto III of Brandenburg in 1245, defeating their rivals Margrave Henry III of Meissen and the Archbishop of Magdeburg.

In 1631, the emissaries of George William, Elector of Brandenburg met at Cöpenick the approaching army of Gustavus Adolphus, King of Sweden, in a vain effort to stop the ongoing devastation of the margraviate during the Thirty Years' War.

In 1686, a commune of French Huguenots was founded.

In 1906, Wilhelm Voigt, a shoemaker and drifter, masqueraded as a Prussian officer and commandeered a squad of soldiers to follow him to Cöpenick to take control of the town hall. Carl Zuckmayer perpetuated the incident in his play The Captain of Cöpenick, on which several film and television adaptations have been based.

By 1907, Cöpenick was the largest town in the county of Teltow. Under the terms of the Greater Berlin Act of 1920, Cöpenick was incorporated as the 16th, and with an area of 128 km^{2} (49 sq mi) the largest, borough of Berlin. Apart from the former town of Cöpenick proper, the borough included the parishes of Oberschöneweide, Grünau, Schmöckwitz, Müggelheim, Rahnsdorf and Friedrichshagen. In 1931, the borough's spelling was officially amended from Cöpenick to nowadays' Köpenick.

In the months that followed the Nazi's rise to power, SA storm troops abducted and brutally tortured residents they considered political adversaries. In June 1933 the terror culminated in the Week of Blood, that left at least 24 Nazi opponents across the political spectrum dead and many more maimed. One of the sites at which the atrocities took place, the prison annex to the district court at Mandrellaplatz, has been turned into a museum. During World War II, Köpenick was the location of a subcamp of the Sachsenhausen concentration camp, mostly for Polish women, but also Czechoslovak, French, Greek, Belgian and Soviet, including of Romani descent.

During the Cold War, Köpenick was part of the Soviet sector and thus East Berlin.

As a result of the 2001 administrative reform, the Berlin borough of Köpenick was merged with that of Treptow to create the current borough of Treptow-Köpenick.

Until it was decommissioned in 2002, a large radio facility for MW and FM was located near the Uhlenhorst neighbourhood, including a 248 m (814 ft) self-radiating radio mast, which was insulated against earth. Following decommissioning, the FM services of this facility were moved to the Fernsehturm at Alexanderplatz and the AM transmitters were moved to a new aerial mast at Zehlendorf bei Oranienburg.

== Köpenick Palace ==
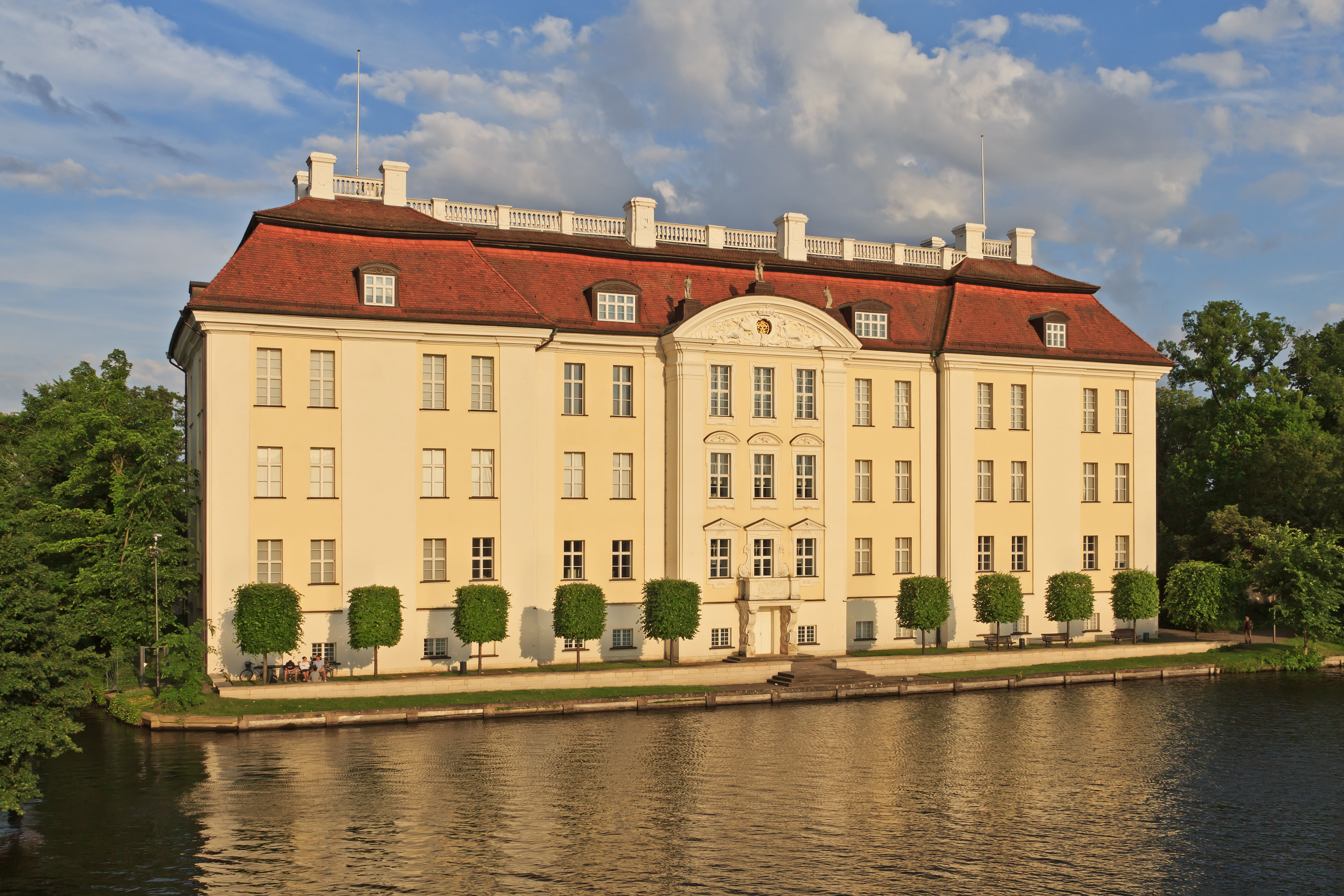
Köpenick Palace

The palace (Schloss Köpenick) was originally built in 1558 as a hunting lodge by order of Elector Joachim II Hector of Brandenburg. The Renaissance style building was located on an island adjacent to the old town at the site of the former medieval fort. Joachim II died here in 1571. In 1631 it served as the headquarters of King Gustavus Adolphus of Sweden, where in vain he beseeched his brother-in-law Elector George William for assistance to his doomed campaign during the Thirty Years' War.

From 1677, Frederick I of Prussia had the hunting lodge rebuilt and enlarged. He then took residence here with his first wife Elizabeth Henrietta of Hesse-Kassel. In 1730 Frederick II of Prussia, then Crown Prince, and his friend Hans Hermann von Katte faced court-martial for desertion at Schloss Köpenick. Today the palace serves as a museum of decorative art run by the Berlin State Museums and is surrounded by a small park, which also contains a Calvinist chapel.

== Culture ==
"Köpenick Summer" (Köpenicker Sommer) is an annual street festival which featuring music, shows and a festival parade led by the Captain of Köpenick (Hauptmann von Köpenick).

== Transport ==
Both the rivers Dahme and Spree are navigable. The Spree connects Köpenick with the Havel and hence the waterway systems of western and central Germany. The Dahme links to the Oder-Spree Canal at nearby Schmöckwitz, thus providing a navigable connection to Eisenhüttenstadt, the Oder river and thus the Baltic Sea and Silesia.

Köpenick is served by Köpenick, Wuhlheide and Hirschgarten stations on the S3 line of the Berlin S-Bahn network, and by the Spindlersfeld terminus of S47 line. Köpenick is also a node on the Berlin tram network, with routes 27, 60, 61, 62, 63, 67 and 68 serving its neighbourhoods.

== Sport ==
The Stadion An der Alten Försterei is home of the 1. FC Union Berlin football club.

Mellowpark is the biggest outdoor skatepark in Europe.

Grünau hosted the 1936 Olympic rowing competitions, and many athletes had lodgings there and nearby, like the American 8-man rowing team as described in Daniel James Brown's Boys in the Boat.

== People ==
- Eugen Anton Theophil von Podbielski (1814-1879), Prussian general
- Castor Watt (1858-1932), German quick-change artist, actor, humorist, imitator
- Wilhelm Rietze (1903-1944), resistance fighter and communist
- Bruno Lüdke (1908-1944), German serial killer
- Maria Landrock (1923-1992), German actress
- Achim Hill (1935-2015), German rower
- Jochen Schümann (born 1954), German sailor
- Georg Kössler (born 1984), German politician
- Tim Bendzko (born 1985), German singer-songwriter
- Laura Ludwig (born 1986), German beach volleyball player
- Jörn Schlönvoigt (born 1986), German actor and singer
