= Joschka Langenbrinck =

German politician

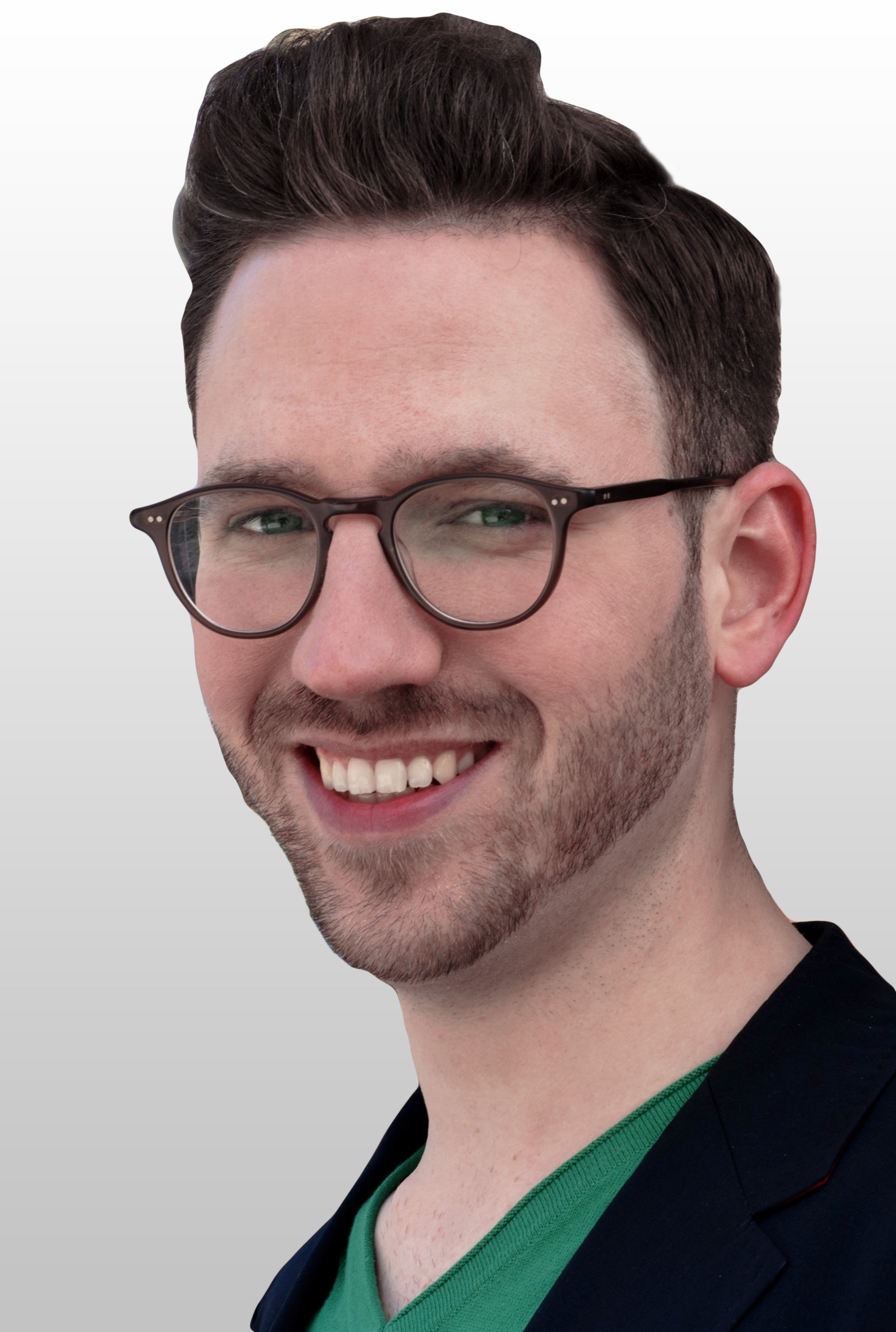

Member of the Abgeordnetenhaus of Berlin
- Incumbent
- Assumed office 27 October 2011
- Constituency: Neukölln 3

Personal details
- Born: 30 April 1985 (age 41) Willich, North Rhine-Westphalia, West Germany
- Party: Social Democratic Party
- Education: University of Potsdam
- Occupation: Politician
- Profession: Political scientist

Joschka Langenbrinck (born 30 April 1985) is a German politician, currently serving as Member of the Abgeordnetenhaus of Berlin since 27 October 2011 representing the Neukölln 3 constituency for the Social Democratic Party.

== Education ==
Langenbrinck was born in Willich in the state of North Rhine-Westphalia. He received his Abitur from the St. Bernhard Gymnasium and then studied Political science at the University of Potsdam, graduating with a diploma. While at university, Langenbrinck was active in student politics, serving as a member of the AStA (student committee).

== Political career ==
After completing his education, Langenbrinck was employed on the staff of several German politicians. He has held various roles within the SPD, including terms as Deputy Chair and Spokesperson of the Neukölln SPD. He is a member of a number of local and political organisations and trade unions, including ver.di.

In the 2011 election Langenbrinck was elected to represent the Neukölln 3 constituency. He has taken a particular interested in education, asking 300 questions to the Education Department, attracting criticism from the Education Secretary, a member of his own party.
