= Albert the Bear =

Margrave of Brandenburg (1100-1170)

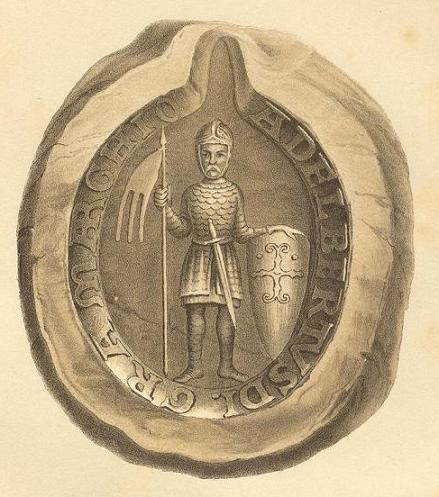
- Effigy on Albert's seal

Margrave of Brandenburg
- Reign: 1157–1170
- Successor: Otto I

Duke of Saxony
- Reign: 1139–1142
- Predecessor: Henry the Proud
- Successor: Henry the Lion
- Born: c. 1100
- Died: 18 November 1170 (aged 70) possibly Stendal
- Burial: Ballenstedt
- Spouse: Sophie of Winzenburg
- Issue more...: Otto I, Margrave of Brandenburg; Hermann I, Count of Orlamünde; Siegfried, Prince-Archbishop of Bremen; Bernhard, Count of Anhalt; Hedwig, Margravine of Meissen
- House: House of Ascania
- Father: Otto, Count of Ballenstedt
- Mother: Eilika of Saxony

Albert the Bear (German: Albrecht der Bär; c. 1100 – 18 November 1170) was the first margrave of Brandenburg from 1157 to his death and was briefly duke of Saxony between 1138 and 1142.

== Life ==
Albert was the only son of Otto, Count of Ballenstedt, and Eilika, daughter of Magnus Billung, Duke of Saxony. He inherited his father's valuable estates in northern Saxony in 1123, and on his mother's death, in 1142, succeeded to one-half of the lands of the house of Billung. Albert was a loyal vassal of his relation, Lothar I, Duke of Saxony, from whom, about 1123, he received the Margraviate of Lusatia, to the east; after Lothar became King of the Germans, he accompanied him on a disastrous expedition to Bohemia against the upstart, Soběslav I, Duke of Bohemia in 1126 at the Battle of Kulm, where he suffered a short imprisonment.

Albert's entanglements in Saxony stemmed from his desire to expand his inherited estates there. After the death in 1128 of his brother-in-law, Henry II, Margrave of the Nordmark, who ruled the Saxon Northern March on the Elbe, Albert expected to receive the fief. When it instead passed to Udo V, Count of Stade, Albert attacked him and was consequently deprived of Lusatia by King Lothair III. Udo, however, was said to have been assassinated by servants of Albert on 15 March 1130 near Aschersleben. In spite of this, Albert went to Italy in 1132 in the king's train, and his services there were rewarded in 1134 by the investiture of the Northern March, which was again without a ruler.

In 1138 Conrad III, the Hohenstaufen King of the Germans, deprived Albert's cousin and nemesis, Henry the Proud, of his Saxon duchy, which was awarded to Albert if he could take it. After some initial success in his efforts to take possession, Albert was driven from Saxony, and also from his Northern March by a combined force of Henry and Jaxa of Köpenick, and compelled to take refuge in south Germany. Henry died in 1139 and an arrangement was found. Henry's son, Henry the Lion, received the duchy of Saxony in 1142. In the same year, Albert renounced the Saxon duchy and received the counties of Weimar and Orlamünde.

Once he was firmly established in the Northern March, Albert's covetous eye lay also on the thinly populated lands to the north and east. For three years he was occupied in campaigns against the Slavic Wends, who as pagans were considered fair game, and whose subjugation to Christianity was the aim of the Wendish Crusade of 1147 in which Albert took part. Albert was a part of the army that besieged Demmin, and at the end of the war, recovered Havelberg, which had been lost since 983. Diplomatic measures were more successful, and by an arrangement made with the last of the Wendish princes of Brandenburg, Pribislav-Henry of the Hevelli, Albert secured this district when the prince died in 1150. Taking the title "Margrave in Brandenburg", he pressed the crusade against the Wends, extended the area of his mark, encouraged Dutch and German settlement in the Elbe-Havel region (Ostsiedlung), established bishoprics under his protection, and so became the founder of the Margraviate of Brandenburg in 1157, which his heirs — the House of Ascania — held until the line died out in 1320.

In 1158 a feud with Henry the Lion, Duke of Saxony, was interrupted by a pilgrimage to the Holy Land. On his return in 1160, he, with the consent of his sons, Siegfried not being mentioned, donated land to the Knights of Saint John in memory of his wife, Sofia, at Werben on the Elbe. Around this same time, he may of minted a pfennig in memory of his deceased wife. In 1162 Albert accompanied Emperor Frederick Barbarossa to Italy, where he distinguished himself at the storming of Milan.

In 1164 Albert joined a league of princes formed against Henry the Lion, and peace being made in 1169, Albert divided his territories among his six sons. He died on 18 November 1170, and was buried at Ballenstedt.

== Cognomen ==
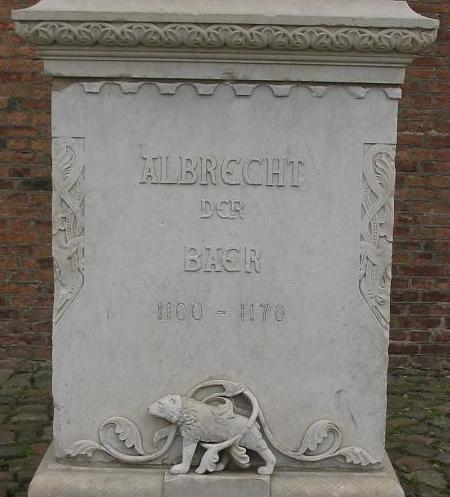
Foundation of the memorial to Albert at Spandau Citadel.

Albert's personal qualities won for him the cognomen of the Bear, "not from his looks or qualities, for he was a tall handsome man, but from the cognisance on his shield, an able man, had a quick eye as well as a strong hand, and could pick what way was straightest among crooked things, was the shining figure and the great man of the North in his day, got much in the North and kept it, got Brandenburg for one there, a conspicuous country ever since," says Thomas Carlyle, who called Albert "a restless, much-managing, wide-warring man." He was also called "the Handsome."

== Marriage and children ==
Albert was married in 1124 to Sophie of Winzenburg (died 25 March 1160) and they had the following children:

1. Otto I, Margrave of Brandenburg (1126/1128–7 March 1184)
2. Count Hermann I of Orlamünde (died 1176), father of Siegfried III, Count of Weimar-Orlamünde
3. Siegfried (died 24 October 1184), Bishop of Brandenburg from 1173 to 1180, Prince-Archbishop of Bremen, the first ranked prince, from 1180 to 1184
4. Heinrich (died after 1185), a canon in Magdeburg
5. Count Albert of Ballenstedt (died after 6 December 1172)
6. Count Dietrich of Werben (died after 5 September 1183)
7. Count Bernhard of Anhalt (1138/1142–9 February 1212), Duke of Saxony from 1180 to 1212 as Bernard III
8. Hedwig (d. 1203), married to Otto II, Margrave of Meissen
9. Gertrude, married in c. 1153 (Note: Mielzarek dates the marriage between 1140 and 1156 with 1153 as the most likely candidate) to Duke Děpold of Moravia
10. Unknown daughter, (Note: Mielzarek suggests that this daughter is identical to the one that married Děpold of Moravia and that the record of "Wladizlaus dux" marrying said daughter is a mistake.) married c. 1153 to Vladislav of Olomouc, the eldest son of Soběslav I, Duke of Bohemia
11. Adelheid (died before 1162), a nun in Lamspringe
12. Unknown daughter, (Note: Mielzarek suggests that she might have been the same daughter as Adelheid if she became a nun after her husband's death in 1148 or 1149.) married before 1146 Otto the Younger, son of Otto of Salm
13. Sybille (died c. 1170), Abbess of Quedlinburg

== Notes ==
Albert (German: Albrecht) of Ballenstedt House of Ascania Born: c. 1100 Died: 18 November 1170 in Stendal?
Regnal titles
Preceded by Otto the Rich	Count of Anhalt; 1123–1170	Succeeded by Bernhard
Preceded by Henry II	Duke of Saxony; 1138–1142	Succeeded by Henry III
New title	Margrave of Brandenburg; 1157–1170	Succeeded by Otto I
