= Pribislav-Henry =

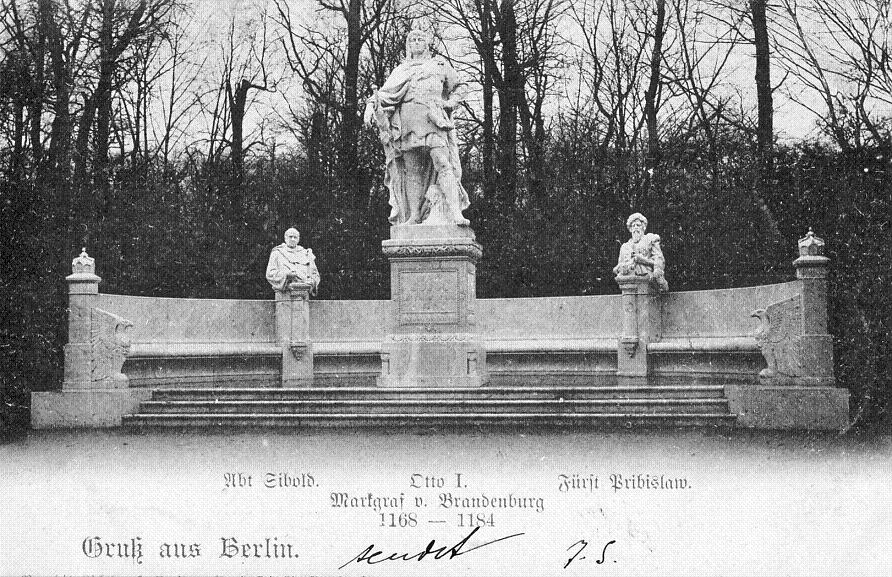
Statue of Pribislav (rightmost figure) flanking that of Otto I (center) on the former Siegesallee (1898), by Max Unger

Pribislav-Henry (German: Pribislaw-Heinrich; d. 1150) was a Slavic Christian prince and the last ruler of the Hevelli (Stodorani) tribe in the Northern March of Brandenburg. His reign started, probably supported by the Ascanians, after the prior Hevelli prince Meinfried had been murdered in 1127. Having no sons of his own, he around 1129 gave the area between Brandenburg and Lehnin to his son-in-law, who was the oldest son of Albert the Bear. Emperor Lothair III approved the gift and made Albert margrave of the Northern March in 1134. In 1150, Pribislav Henry died and was succeeded, after a short war of succession, by Albert the Bear.
