= Sprevane =

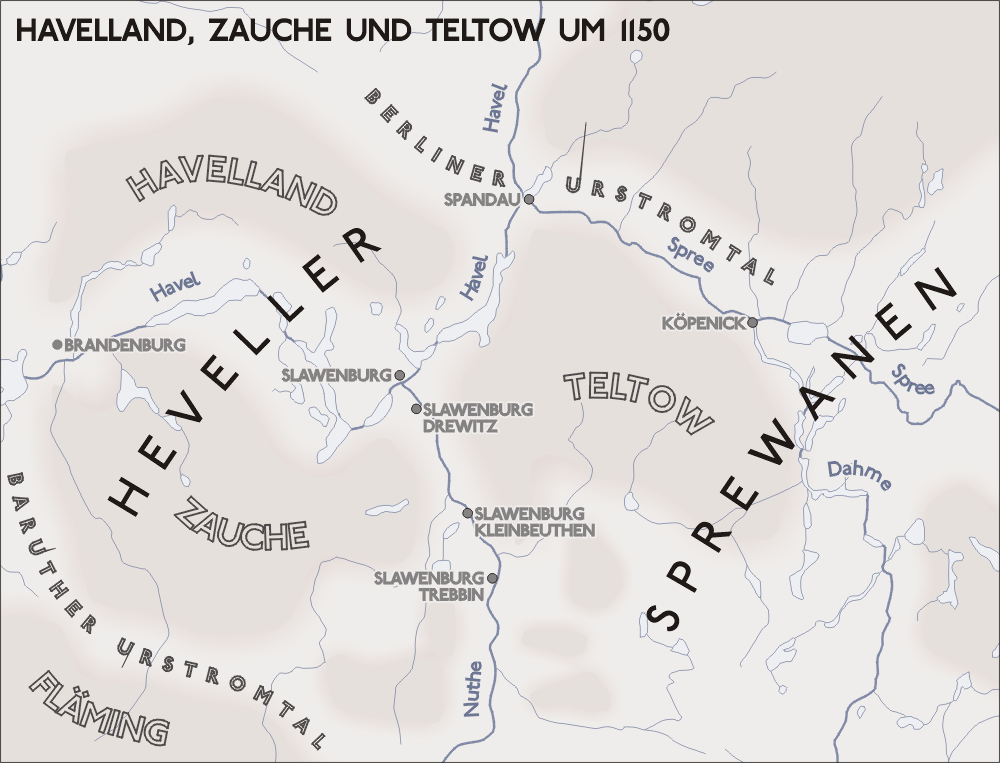
Lands of the Sprevane and Hevelli, about 1150 AD.

The Sprevane or Sprevani (German: Sprewanen; Slavonic: Sprevjane) were a Slavic tribe who lived around the river Spree, where Berlin is now, in the Brandenburg area of eastern Germany. They were first recorded in 948 and again in 965 as living in the territory of the Holy Roman Empire under Otto I, Holy Roman Emperor. Archaeological finds point to them coming to the area in the 8th century, and by 825 they started to build a settlement in today's Köpenick, a district of Berlin.

Their name is from Sprevja (the local Slavonic form of the river name Spree, meaning "to the right side") plus the Slavonic ethnic suffix -an (= the one living in that area) and "-e" meaning plural. The Germanized form, Sprewanen, may have been influenced by the German verb wohnen (in Old High German, wonen), meaning "to dwell", but is also correct German plural of singular Sprevan.

== See also ==
- List of medieval Slavic tribes
