= Röhl =

Röhl is a surname of German origin. Notable people with the surname include:

- Bettina Röhl (born 1962), German journalist
- Christoph Röhl (born 1967), British-German filmmaker
- Danny Röhl (born 1989), German footballer
- Elisabeth Röhl (1888–1930), German politician
- Gisela Röhl, German racing cyclist
- John C. G. Röhl (1938–2023), British historian
- Karl Peter Röhl (1890–1975), German artist
- Klaus Rainer Röhl (1928–2021), German journalist and author
- Maria Röhl (1801–1875), Swedish portrait artist
- Merlin Röhl (born 2002), German footballer

== See also ==
- Rohl, a list of people with the surname Rohl or Roehl
