= Rohl =

Rohl and Roehl are surnames. Notable people with either surname include:

- Charles Roehl (1857–1927), Washington state pioneer and businessman
- William Roehl (1890–1968), Washington state pioneer and businessman
- Edwin Rohl (1908–1996), American politician
- Kacey Rohl (born 1991), Canadian actress
- Michael Rohl, Canadian TV director
- Michael Rohl (politician), American politician
- Michelle Rohl (born 1965), American race-walker
