= Charles Roehl =

Prussian-born American pioneer (1857–1927)

Charles F. Roehl
- Born: June 16, 1857; Brandenburg, Kingdom of Prussia
- Died: September 19, 1927 (aged 70); Bellingham, Washington, US
- Occupations: Treasurer in New Whatcom Eyrie No. 31.; merchant; real estate businessman
- Known for: Pioneer and businessman of Bellingham, Washington, who was considered one of the best-known merchants in the liquor trade and took an active part in high-end real estate dealings.
- Family: William Roehl (brother)

Charles F. Roehl (June 16, 1857 – September 19, 1927) was a Prussian-born American pioneer and businessman of Bellingham, Washington. He was considered one of the most well-established businessmen of the city, influencing its industrial growth through his mercantile and real estate businesses.

Roehl came to Bellingham Bay in 1883. He acquired a piece of land from the government and bought a lot on Elk street. Together with his brother, William Roehl, Roehl purchased a stock of alcohol in San Francisco, and in 1884 they became wholesale and retail merchants. That year, an economic depression in Whatcom (later Bellingham) started, forcing the brothers to leave the business and the city for some time. In 1889, they returned and resumed their trade activity.

Over the years, the Roehl brothers owned a number of liquor houses. They were known for the distribution of cigars, wines, and other liquors, including their highly esteemed whisky. In 1902, the Roehl brothers experienced difficulty in their business due to new trade rulings, and left trading. Afterwards, the brothers turned their full attention to investments in real estate. They built, owned, rented, bought and sold property, some of which were considered the best at the time, including the Hotel Byron (later the Leopold Hotel) and the Lighthouse Block in Whatcom, and the Knights of Pythias Building in Fairhaven, Washington.

== Early life, family and education ==
Charles Roehl was born on June 16, 1857, in Brandenburg, Kingdom of Prussia. His parents were John Casper Roehl and Elizabeth Roehl (Kublanc), both German descendants. The family emigrated to the United States of America, settling in Texas. John Casper died there in 1896, and Elizabeth in 1902.

Charles Roehl was one of six children. His brothers were William Roehl, who worked with Charles in merchandise and real estate businesses for many years, and August, who raised stock in Texas. They had three sisters: Lottie, who married Peter Winter, a contractor from Bryan, Texas; Alvina, who married Max Kiesewetter, a barber from Beaumont, Texas; and Minnie, who married Fred Viereck and had five children.

Roehl received his education in German schools. He graduated in 1873 and started to work.

== Career ==
Roehl worked in Germany until in 1874 the family moved to Texas, where he started his career in merchandise as a store employee in 1878.

=== Whatcom, Washington ===
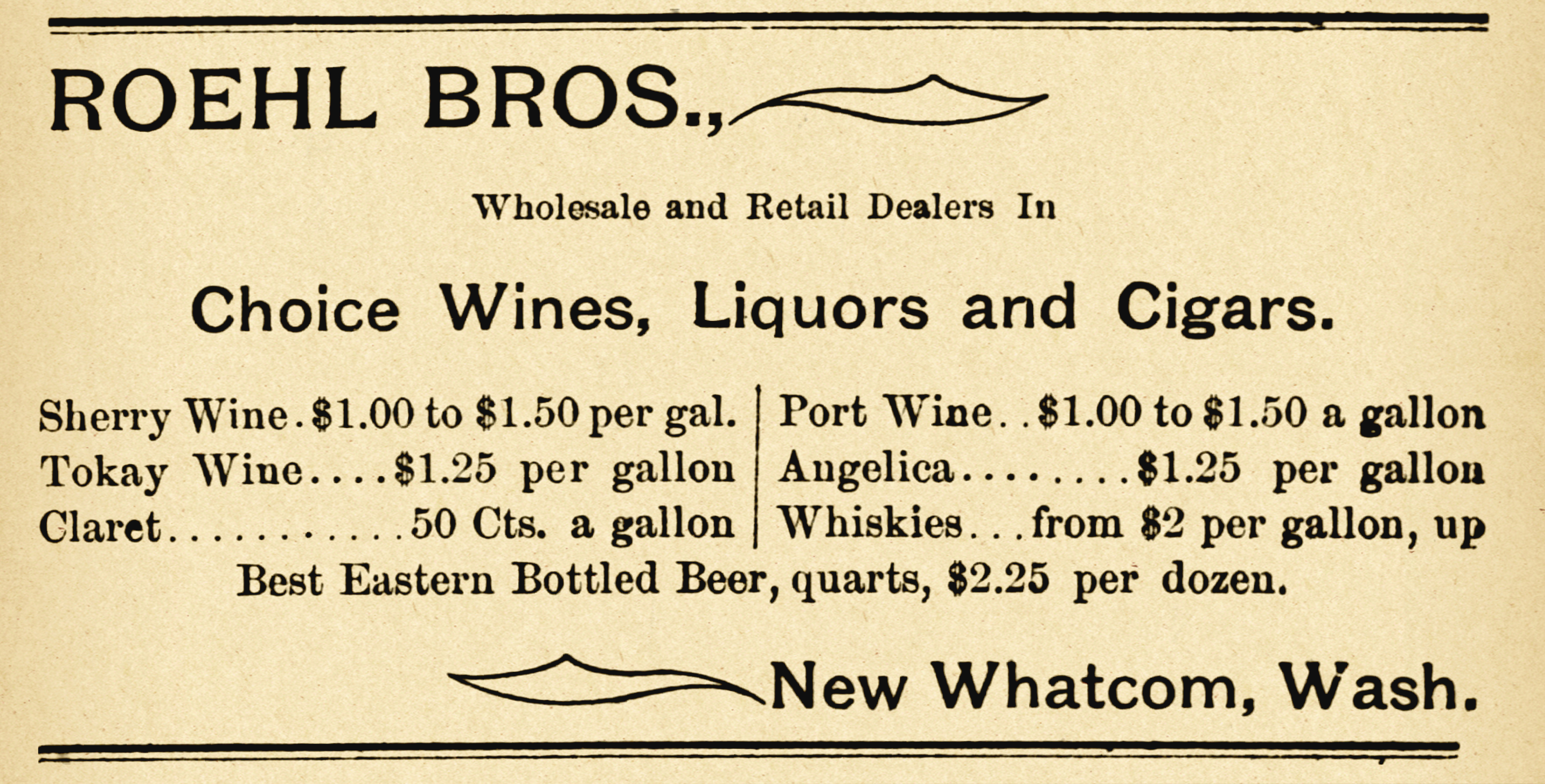
Roehl Bros. advertisement, 1886

In 1883, Roehl left Texas and settled in Washington State. On December 31, 1883, as one of the pioneers of the locality, he came to Bellingham Bay, making plans to head to Tacoma, Washington next. However, Isaac Kalloch, an ex-mayor of San Francisco, persuaded him to stay in Whatcom (later Bellingham) instead.

Roehl stayed on Bellingham Bay, acquiring a piece of land from the government and buying a lot on Elk street. Using his savings, he also built a house in Whatcom. After he was fully settled, Roehl invited his brother William to join him in business there.

Together with his brother, Roehl purchased a stock of alcohol in San Francisco, and in 1884, they started their business as wholesale and retail merchants. At the time, there was a plan for a railroad to go through Whatcom and connect to the Canadian line in Sumas, Washington. This plan spurred the town's rapid growth and businesses for six or seven months. Unfortunately, the Canadian government declined the connection between the railroad lines, leading to an economic depression in Whatcom. The Roehl brothers were forced to close their business, and left the city.

=== San Diego, California ===
During the depression in Whatcom, the brothers separated, and Charles moved to San Diego. He was joined there by his brother a year later. The Roehl brothers started investing their money into the growth of San Diego, but ended up losing their investments without benefit.

=== Trade resuming in Washington ===
In 1889, the Roehl brothers returned to Whatcom and restarted their business as wine, liquor, and cigar merchants, their specialty being "the best Kentucky whisky."

From 1896 to 1900, the brothers owned a liquor house (at the time in Washington State, typically a point of wholesale for alcohol) in the Lighthouse Block at the corner of Holly and Dock Streets. On June 1 that year, they sold it to the Capital Brewing Company. At the time, they were already in the process of establishing a new liquor house in the Byron House. Their new establishment consisted of a bar, billiard hall, and private card room; the whole property was 27 ft × 110 ft (8.2 m × 33.5 m).

In 1902, U.S. and Canadian trade disagreements led to the enforcement of the tariff act of July 24, 1897. The new trade rulings resulted in confiscation of liquor shipments. Among others, one of Roehls' shipments, going from Victoria, British Columbia to Whatcom, was seized. Later in 1902, the Roehl brothers retired from the liquor business.

=== Real estate dealings ===
While working in merchandise, the brothers entered real estate business. During their career in the field, they owned, built, and rented property regarded as "some of the best" of that time. They took an active part in property purchase and sales, earning sizable profit.

Among the Roehl brothers' dealings were two brick buildings on Holly Street that they rented out. On Dock Street, they erected a two-story brick building, sized 50 ft × 70 ft (15 m × 21 m), also for rental purposes. They owned a Knights of Pythias Building in Fairhaven, Washington and a vast array of residential property around Whatcom.

One of their real estate deals was selling the Hotel Byron to businessmen Charles Wright and M. C. Dickinson. It was later renamed the Leopold Hotel, "one of the finest and most modern hotels" called. In 1902, the Roehl brothers bought the Lighthouse Block, planning to convert the building into a hotel. However, it was decided to divide the existent theater space into two floors and place offices there. Steam heat and the first magnetic elevator in the city were installed in the building. The brothers owned the building for six years, and in 1908 sold it to the First National Bank of Bellingham.

=== Other activity ===
Roehl also participated in the city's social life. In 1899, he became a treasurer for the Fraternal Order of Eagles filial, named New Whatcom Eyrie No. 31.

== Personal life, family and death ==
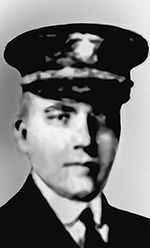
Roehl's son, William F. Roehl, 1921

Roehl married Emma Hull in December 1889. She was a daughter of Nathan Hull, one of the pioneers of eastern Oregon and a fruit grower who later lived in suburbs of Los Angeles, California.

The Roehls had a son, William F. Roehl, was educated in the schools of Bellingham, Washington, and graduated from Gonzaga College in Spokane. Later, he was appointed a Naval Academy student in Annapolis, Maryland by U. S. Senator Piles. He graduated as ensign in May 1914, and later was promoted to lieutenant. He served in a number of different places, including Mexican, Central American, and European waters. In 1921, he was a chief engineer on the dreadnought New York, choosing this career over the position of an instructor in his alma mater.

Charles Roehl died on September 19, 1927, in Bellingham, Washington at the age of 70.

== See also ==
- William Roehl
- Isaac Smith Kalloch
- Leopold Hotel
- Knights of Pythias
- Fraternal Order of Eagles

== Literature cited ==
Laws of Washington territory, Olympia: C.B. Bagley, 1881, LCCN 37009329, OCLC 83683698
"Roehl Bros.", The Islander, Friday Harbor: J.C. Wheeler, p. 3, December 17, 1896, ISSN 2333-844X, LCCN 88085189, OCLC 17347706
"Whatcom", The Spokesman-Review, Spokane: Cowles Company, p. 8, October 9, 1899, ISSN 1064-7317, LCCN sn84024754, OCLC 11102610
Blethen, Alden J., ed. (June 23, 1900), "A fine record", Seattle Daily Times, Seattle: The Seattle Times Company, p. 14, ISSN 2639-4898, LCCN sn86072007, OCLC 1765328
Blethen, Alden J., ed. (March 7, 1902), "Liquors are held", Seattle Daily Times, Seattle: The Seattle Times Company, p. 2, ISSN 2639-4898, LCCN sn86072007, OCLC 1765328
Blethen, Alden J., ed. (December 29, 1902), "Not yet clear", Seattle Daily Times, Seattle: The Seattle Times Company, p. 4, ISSN 2639-4898, LCCN sn86072007, OCLC 1765328
"Bellingham man offered Annapolis instructorship", Seattle Daily Times, Seattle: The Seattle Times Company, p. 5, November 6, 1921, ISSN 2639-4898, LCCN sn86072007, OCLC 1765328
"Chas. F. Roehl dies: Pioneer community builder of city is summoned", Bellingham Herald, Bellingham: Fairhaven Publishing Co., September 20, 1927, ISSN 2638-3160, LCCN sn86071989, OCLC 14287261
"C. F. Roehl, Pioneer of Bellingham, dies", Seattle Daily Times, Seattle: The Seattle Times Company, p. 13, September 21, 1927, ISSN 2639-4898, LCCN sn86072007, OCLC 1765328
"Building was Cornwall's commercial beacon", Bellingham Business Journal, Everett: Sound Publishing Inc., August 31, 2005
Hunt, Herbert; Kaylor, Floyd C. (1917), Washington, west of the Cascades; historical and descriptive; the explorers, the Indians, the pioneers, the modern, Chicago: S. J. Clarke Publishing Company, LCCN 18015511, OCLC 10086413
Prosser, William Farrand (1903), Lewis, Edward Gardner (ed.), A history of the Puget Sound country, its resources, its commerce and its people, New York City: Edward Gardner Lewis, LCCN 05013767
