= Marie Juchacz =

German politician (1879–1956)

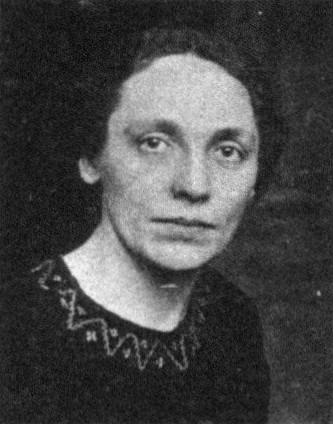
- Juchacz c. 1919

Chairwoman of the Workers' Welfare Committee
- In office December 1919 – March 1933
- Preceded by: Position established
- Succeeded by: Robert Görlinger

Member of the Reichstag for Potsdam I
- In office 24 June 1920 – 22 June 1933
- Preceded by: Constituency established
- Succeeded by: Constituency abolished

Member of the National Assembly for Potsdam I
- In office 6 February 1919 – 21 May 1920
- Preceded by: Office established
- Succeeded by: Office abolished

Personal details
- Born: Marie Gohlke; 15 March 1879 Landsberg an der Warthe, Province of Brandenburg, German Empire (In Poland since 1945)
- Died: 28 January 1956 (aged 76) Düsseldorf, West Germany
- Party: SPD
- Spouse: Bernhard Juchacz (m. 1903; div. 1906)
- Children: Lotte; Paul
- Relatives: Elisabeth Röhl (sister)
- Occupation: Politician
- Known for: Pioneer in the fields of women's rights and welfare

Marie Juchacz (German pronunciation: [maˈʁiː ˈjʊxatʃ]; née Marie Gohlke; born Landsberg an der Warthe, 15 March 1879; died Düsseldorf, 28 January 1956) was a German politician, social reformer and women's rights activist. She served as a member of the Reichstag from 1919 to 1933 and founded the Workers' Welfare Committee, serving as its chairwoman from 1919 to 1933.

She joined the Social Democratic Party (SPD) in 1908, more than ten years before women acquired the right to vote, and pursued a career that included politics, becoming, in 1919, the first female Reichstag member to address a German parliament.

== Life and career ==
=== Early years ===
Marie was the daughter of a carpenter called Theodor Gohlke and his wife Henriette. Her childhood was marked by rural poverty, and she was obliged to leave school when aged 14. After finishing at the local school in Landsberg an der Warthe, Juchacz, whose beliefs were Protestant, began work in 1893, first as a maid, and then, briefly, in a factory that made curtains and fishing nets. Her father suffered from a lung infection and since he had no health insurance, after she left school Marie's wage packet was important for keeping the family afloat. From 1896 to 1898 she worked as a nurse in the local psychiatric institution. Looking back on the long hours of poorly paid shift work at the institution she recalled that she had soon become used to "sleeping while sitting on hard, rigid chairs ("..im Sitzen auf harten, steifen Stuhlen zu schlafen...").

She later completed an apprenticeship as a dressmaker, and took a job with a tailor named Bernhard Juchacz whom, in 1903, she married. Their daughter Lotte was born in the same year. Their second child, Paul, was born in 1905, but the marriage ended in divorce in 1906 and Marie Juchacz moved to Berlin, accompanied by her two children, her younger sister, Elisabeth Kirschmann-Röhl (1888–1930). and Elisabeth's children. The sisters set up house together in Berlin with their children, forming out of necessity what was seen as an unconventional family unit. Marie worked at dressmaking until 1913.

=== Political awakening ===
Marie had been introduced to politics by her older brother, Otto Gohlke, who in the later 1890s had encouraged her to read popular political works of the time such as "Die Waffen nieder!" (Throw down the weapons) by Bertha von Suttner and "Die Frau und der Sozialismus" (Woman and socialism) by August Bebel. Around 1903 she met Wilhelm Paetzel who was frequently in Landsberg where his family lived. Paetzel had an important job with "Vorwärts", a Berlin publishing house, and was also an activist with the SPD and the Landsberg party candidate in the 1907 election.

Marie Juchacz joined the SPD herself in 1908. In a campaign headed up by August Bebel the SPD had called for women to be permitted to join political parties in 1879, but they were nevertheless excluded until the repeal of the old Prussian Association Law in 1908. Marie Juchacz was one of the first female party members. It would be more than another decade before women were allowed to vote in German elections however.

=== The SPD ===
As an active party member Juchacz quickly became a popular speaker at political meetings. In 1913 she was appointed to a paid position by the party as the Cologne women's secretary in what was then the Upper Rhine province. Her children remained in Berlin, looked after by her sister. She was nominated for the job, which she retained till 1917, by Luise Zietz (1865–1922) who had been appointed in 1908 to the SPD executive committee, in which Zietz was still at this stage the only woman. Much of Juchacz's attention in her new post was devoted to looking after the organisation of female textile workers in the Aachen area.

=== The war ===
In November 1914 she gave a series of presentations to the "National Women's Association" (Nationale Frauengemeinschaft) entitled, "The Social obligations of Women in Wartime". Despite her reputation as a public speaker, this was the first time she had addressed meetings that were not composed only of workers and SPD party members. Organising these presentations with Juchacz also gave an opportunity for non-state based welfare group members to get to know her.

During the First World War, Marie Juchacz worked, together with Anna Maria Schulte, Else Meerfeld and Elisabeth Röhl (her sister, who later remarried and became Elisabeth Kirschmann or, in other sources, Elisabeth Kirschmann-Röhl), organising the "Home Work Centre" (Heimarbeitszentrale). This involved setting up sewing centres to give women the opportunity to work from home, along with other support for war widows and orphans. Juchacz was also a member of the so-called Food Commission (Lebensmittelkommission) which set up and operated soup kitchens.

=== Party crisis ===
In 1917, after more than a year of rising internal tensions, the Social Democratic Party split apart. There was disagreement over a range of domestic issues and over opposition to the war by the "anti-revisionist" wing that included high-profile party leaders such as Karl Liebknecht and Rosa Luxemburg. The left wingers formed the Independent Social Democratic Party (USPD). The majority, including Marie Juchacz, remained with the mainstream Majority SPD under the Chairmanship of Friedrich Ebert who was always staunch in supporting the war effort. In 1917 she returned to Berlin when she accepted Ebert's invitation to become the Women's Secretary in the Party's national leadership in succession to Luise Zietz. In the same year Juchacz was elected to the SPD's national executive committee. She also, in 1917, took over from Clara Zetkin the editorship of the women's newspaper "Die Gleichheit" ("Equality").

It was, perhaps, the unfamiliarity of her opening salutation in this context that caused Juchacz's address to the Weimar parliament to be interrupted by laughter after just four words:

"Gentlemen and ladies... [interrupted by laughter] This is the first time that a woman has been allowed to address the people in the parliament on free and equal terms, and I wish to establish here, entirely objectively, that in Germany as elsewhere, the revolution has overwhelmed the old preconceptions."

Marie Juchacz addressing the national parliament

(19 February 1919)

„Meine Herren und Damen!“ (Heiterkeit.) „Es ist das erste Mal, dass eine Frau als Freie und Gleiche im Parlament zum Volke sprechen darf, und ich möchte hier feststellen, ganz objektiv, dass es die Revolution gewesen ist, die auch in Deutschland die alten Vorurteile überwunden hat.“

Marie Juchacz addressing the national parliament

(19 February 1919)

=== National Assembly member ===
On 6 February 1919, Marie Juchacz and her sister were two of the 36 women elected to the Weimar National Assembly (which in June 1920 was superseded by the national Reichstag, to which Juchacz was also elected). On 19 February, exactly a month after the first national election in which women had been permitted to vote, Marie became the first woman to make a speech before that body, or indeed any German parliament.

She was also the only woman on the "National Assembly Advisory Board to Draft a Constitution for the German state" (Ausschuß zur Vorberatung des Entwurfs einer Verfassung des Deutschen Reichs)

In the election of 6 June 1920 Juchacz (unlike her sister Elisabeth) retained a seat in the national Reichstag, now representing the SPD for the Potsdam electoral district, and she remained a Reichstag member until 1933.

Having made her mark with her first speech to the National Assembly, Juchacz's powerful oratory was again on display with her final contribution, in the turbulent Reichstag debate that followed the Presidential Election in April 1932. She was, again, the only woman to speak in the debate, and she was uncompromising in her attack on the Nazi Party.

=== Workers' Welfare Committee ===
Building on ideas of combining self-help with welfare provision that she had developed while organising wartime support organisations, on 13 December 1919 Marie Juchacz founded the Workers' Welfare Committee (AWO) committee. Its full name (then) was "Social Democratic Party Main Committee for Worker Welfare" (Hauptausschuss für Arbeiterwohlfahrt in der SPD). Friedrich Ebert, the SPD (party) leader and by now Germany's chancellor summed up the organisation's mission and its approach with the slogan, "The Workers' Welfare [committee] is the Self-help of the Workforce." (Arbeiterwohlfahrt ist die Selbsthilfe der Arbeiterschaft). The AWO was suppressed under the Nazis but resurrected in 1946, now independent of any political party, and is today an important element in Germany's decentralised welfare infrastructure, employing across the country 145,000 people plus around another 100,000 volunteers, and with approximately 400,000 members.

Despite her membership of the Reichstag, it was the AWO that was increasingly the focus of Juchacz's activities during the 1920s, as she found the party political mandate and functions less important than coordinating support for people needing help.

After the 1932 presidential election, Marie Juchacz spoke defiantly against the Nazi tide in her final speech to the Reichstag

"Women... do not want civil war, and want no peoples' war. Women want no exacerbation of economic deprivation arising from political adventuring domestically and abroad. Women... see through the hollowness of a particularly male set of policies, dictated by short-sightedness, empty vanity and fame-seeking. Our love for our people compels us to resist with all out power these policies, the Nazi policies...."

Marie Juchacz addressing the Reichstag

(1932)

„Die Frauen ... wollen keinen Bürgerkrieg, wollen keinen Völkerkrieg, die Frauen wollen keine Verschärfung der Wirtschaftsnot durch innen- und außenpolitische Abenteuer.... Die Frauen ... durchschauen die Hohlheit einer Politik, die sich als besonders männlich gibt, obwohl sie nur von Kurzsichtigkeit, Eitelkeit und Renommiersucht diktiert ist. Dieser Politik, der nationalsozialistischen Politik, mit allen Kräften entgegenzutreten, zwingt uns unsere Liebe zu unserem Volke…“

Marie Juchacz addressing the Reichstag

(1932)

=== Exile ===
On 30 January 1933 Adolf Hitler was appointed Reichs Chancellor. The AWO continued to function for a few more months, but after the Reichstag fire at the end of February and the Reichstag election of 5 March 1933, political parties found themselves banned, with the SPD, second only to the Nazi party in the March elections, prominent in the firing line. SPD members were killed or arrested while others lost their jobs. The AWO, like other organisations that had opposed the Nazi tide, disintegrated. The SPD leadership fled to Prague while Juchacz, now aged 54, and together with her sister's widower, Emil Kirschmann, fled to Saarbrücken, which at this stage was still under French military control. In Saarbrücken she continued to campaign against National Socialism, and also set up a lunch centre to provide some contact for refugees from Germany who suddenly found themselves stateless.

The Saarland (including Saarbrücken) had been occupied by French troops under terms imposed by the Treaty of Versailles (1919), which had also required that after fifteen years the inhabitants of the region should be permitted a vote on their future citizenship. Despite the recent Nazi takeover in Germany, in 1935 Saarlanders voted to rejoin Germany, and as a high-profile refugee from the Nazi regime, Juchacz was obliged to move again, this time to Mulhouse in Alsace (which had been in France since 1919, though German dialects still predominate in many parts of the region). In Mulhouse, she was not politically active. In 1940 the German army successfully invaded northern France and Juchacz, along with many German socialists and communists who had since 1933 moved to Paris, now had to move again, to the southern part of France, reaching Marseilles at the end of 1940.

In 1941 she fled again, on an emergency visa, to New York City, via Martinique. In New York, she was reunited with her sister's widower, Emil Kirschmann. She learned English and, in 1945, directly following the end of World War II, established "Arbeiterwohlfahrt USA – Hilfe für die Opfer des Nationalsozialismus", a New York-based equivalent of the AWO with its focus on support for victims of Nazism, sending parcels of food and other essentials to a destroyed Germany.

In 1949, Juchacz returned to Germany from exile in the United States and was made the AWO's honorary chairwoman.

== Recognition ==
Several cities have honoured Marie Juchacz by naming streets "Marie-Juchacz-Straße" or "Marie-Juchacz-Weg". In 2003, she was also honoured by Deutsche Post in its Women in German history series of postage stamps.

Since 1969 the AWO has issued, as its highest mark of honour and recognition, the Marie Juchacz Plaque. It is presented to AWO members who have demonstrated particular commitment to the AWO and stood up for its political interests.

== See also ==
- History of the Social Democratic Party of Germany
