= Brandenburg =

State in Germany

State of Brandenburg Land Brandenburg (German) Land Brannenborg (Low German) Kraj Bramborska (Lower Sorbian)
- State
- Flag Coat of arms
- Anthem: "Märkische Heide, märkischer Sand" (Unofficial) (English: "Brandenburglied")
- Interactive map of State of Brandenburg
- Coordinates: 52°21′43″N 13°0′29″E
- Country: Germany
- Capital (and largest city): Potsdam

Government
  - Body: Landtag of Brandenburg
  - Minister-President: Dietmar Woidke (SPD)
  - Governing parties: SPD / CDU
  - Bundesrat votes: 4 (of 69)
  - Bundestag seats: 21 (of 630) (as of 2025)

Area
  - Total: 29,654.38 km^{2} (11,449.62 sq mi)

Population (2024-12-31)
  - Total: 2,556,747
  - Density: 86.21819/km^{2} (223.3041/sq mi)

GDP
  - Total: €104,100 billion (2025)
  - Per capita: €40,716 (2025)
- Time zone: UTC+1 (CET)
  - Summer (DST): UTC+2 (CEST)
- ISO 3166 code: DE-BB
- Vehicle registration: formerly: BP (1945–1947), SB (1948–1953)
- NUTS Region: DE4
- HDI (2022): 0.926 very high · 14th of 16
- Website: brandenburg.de

Brandenburg, officially the State of Brandenburg (see Names), is a landlocked state in northeastern Germany. Brandenburg borders Poland and the states of Berlin, Mecklenburg-Vorpommern, Lower Saxony, Saxony-Anhalt, and Saxony. It is the fifth-largest German state by area and the tenth-most populous, with 2.5 million residents. Potsdam is the state capital and largest city. Other major towns are Cottbus, Brandenburg an der Havel and Frankfurt (Oder).

Brandenburg surrounds the national capital and city-state of Berlin. Together they form the Berlin/Brandenburg Metropolitan Region, the third-largest metropolitan area in Germany. There was an unsuccessful attempt to unify both states in 1996, and the states still cooperate on many matters.

Brandenburg originated in the Northern March in the 900s AD, from areas conquered from the Wends. It later became the Margraviate of Brandenburg, a major principality of the Holy Roman Empire. In the 15th century, it came under the rule of the House of Hohenzollern, which later established Brandenburg-Prussia, the core of the later Kingdom of Prussia. From 1815 to 1947, Brandenburg was a province of Prussia.

Following the abolition of Prussia after World War II, Brandenburg was established as a state by the Soviet Military Administration in Germany. All lands that were previously part of Brandenburg but east of the Oder–Neisse line had been ceded to Poland. In 1952, the German Democratic Republic dissolved the state and broke it up into multiple regional districts. After German reunification, Brandenburg was re-established in 1990 as one of the five new states of the Federal Republic.

Southeastern Brandenburg contains part of the historical Lower Lusatia, and most of these localities have two official languages, German and Lower Sorbian (of the Sorbs/Wends).

== Names ==
Brandenburg takes its name from Brandenburg an der Havel. The name's origin is unclear but it is thought to derive from the Slavic branyi ('marshy/boggy') or Germanic branda ('fire'). Other theories have included West Slavic branný bor ('defensive forest') and brani-bor ('pine forest'). Burg in German means 'castle'. In the extinct local language Polabian, Brandenburg was Branibor.

In the modern local languages, Brandenburg and the State of Brandenburg are named:

- German: Brandenburg ([ˈbʁandn̩bʊʁk]) and Land Brandenburg
- Low German: Brannenborg and Land Brannenborg
- Lower Sorbian: Bramborska [ˈbrambɔrska] and Kraj Bramborska

== History ==
In late medieval and early modern times, Brandenburg was, with varying borders, one of seven electoral states of the Holy Roman Empire, and, along with Prussia, formed the original core of the German Empire, the first unified German state. Governed by the Hohenzollern dynasty from 1415, it contained the future German capital Berlin. After 1618 the Margraviate of Brandenburg and the Duchy of Prussia were combined to form Brandenburg-Prussia, which was ruled by the same branch of the House of Hohenzollern. In 1701 the state was elevated as the Kingdom of Prussia. Franconian Nuremberg and Ansbach, Swabian Hohenzollern, the eastern European connections of Berlin, and the status of Brandenburg's ruler as prince-elector together were instrumental in the rise of that state.

=== Early Middle Ages ===
Brandenburg is situated in territory known in antiquity as Magna Germania, which reached to the Vistula river. By the 7th century, Slavic people are believed to have settled in the Brandenburg area. The Slavs expanded from the east, possibly driven from their homelands in present-day Ukraine and perhaps Belarus by the invasions of the Huns and Avars. They relied heavily on river transport. The two principal Slavic groups in the present-day area of Brandenburg were the Hevelli in the west and the Sprevane in the east.

Beginning in the early 10th century, Henry the Fowler and his successors conquered territory up to the Oder River. Slavic settlements such as Brenna (Brandenburg an der Havel), Budusin (Bautzen), and Chośebuz (Cottbus) came under imperial control through the installation of margraves. Their main function was to defend and protect the eastern marches. In 948, Emperor Otto I established margraves to exert imperial control over the pagan Slavs west of the Oder River. Otto founded the Bishoprics of Brandenburg and Havelberg. The Northern March was founded as a northeastern border territory of the Holy Roman Empire. However, a great uprising of Wends drove imperial forces from the territory of present-day Brandenburg in 983. The region returned to the control of Slavic leaders. The eastern parts of current Brandenburg, i.e. the Lubusz Land and Lower Lusatia, became part of Poland in the 10th–11th centuries.

=== Late Middle Ages ===
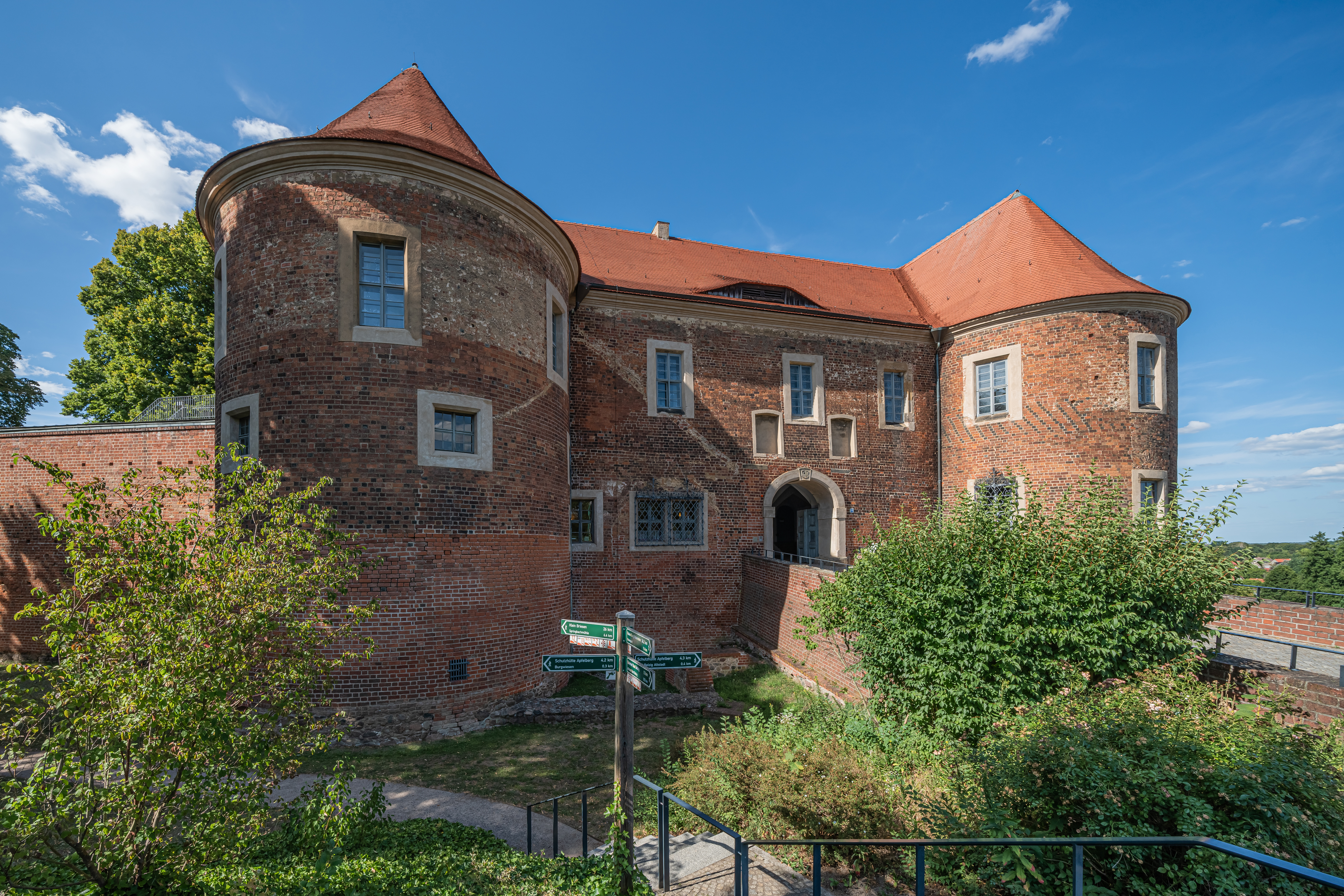
Eisenhardt Castle in Bad Belzig

In the early 12th century, the Slavic Duchy of Kopanica was established in the central part of present-day Brandenburg, whereas the Lubusz Land in the east remained part of medieval Poland. During the 12th century, the German kings and emperors re-established control over the Slav-inhabited lands of present-day Brandenburg, excluding Polish-controlled Lubusz Land, although some Slavs like the Sorbs in Lusatia adapted to Germanization while retaining their distinctiveness. The Roman Catholic Church brought bishoprics which, with their walled towns, afforded protection from attacks for the townspeople. With the monks and bishops, the history of the town of Brandenburg an der Havel, which was the first center of the state of Brandenburg, began.

In 1134, in the wake of a German crusade against the Wends, the German magnate, Albert the Bear, was granted the Northern March by the Emperor Lothar III. He formally inherited the town of Brandenburg and the lands of the Hevelli from their last Wendish ruler, Pribislav, in 1150. After crushing a force of Sprevane who occupied the town of Brandenburg in the 1150s, Albert proclaimed himself ruler of the new Margraviate of Brandenburg. The systematic settlement of the region by colonists from other parts of Germany and the Low Countries began around 1157. Albert, and his descendants the Ascanians, made considerable progress in conquering, colonizing, Christianizing, and cultivating lands as far east as the Oder. Within this region, Slavic and German residents intermarried. During the 13th century, the Ascanians acquired the Uckermark from Pomerania-Stettin and the Lebus Land from Poland (later known as the Neumark, in contrast to the Altmark, the cradle of the March of Brandenburg).

In 1320, the Brandenburg Ascanian line came to an end, and from 1323 up until 1415 Brandenburg was under the control of the Wittelsbachs of Bavaria, followed by the Luxembourg dynasty. Under the Wittelsbachs, the Margrave of Brandenburg gained the status of a prince-elector of the Holy Roman Empire. In 1415, the Electorate of Brandenburg was granted by Emperor Sigismund to the House of Hohenzollern, which would rule until the end of World War I. The Hohenzollerns established their capital in Berlin, by then the economic center of Brandenburg.

=== 16th and 17th centuries ===
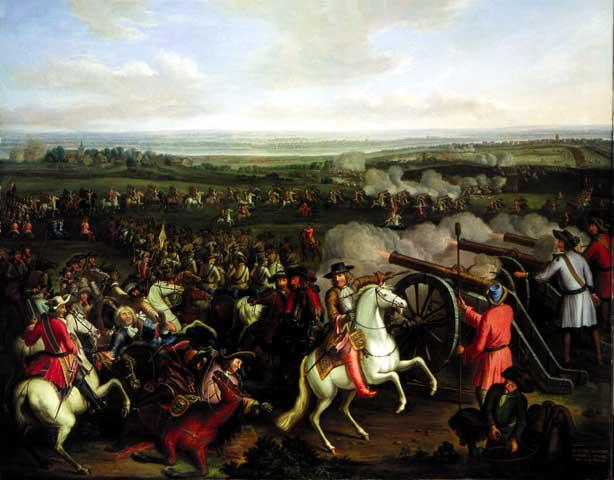
Brandenburg's victory over Swedish forces at the Battle of Fehrbellin in 1675

Brandenburg converted to Protestantism in 1539 in the wake of the Protestant Reformation, and generally did quite well in the 16th century, with the expansion of trade along the Elbe, Havel, and Spree rivers. The Hohenzollerns expanded their territory by co-rulership since 1577 and acquiring the Duchy of Prussia in 1618, the Duchy of Cleves (1614) in the Rhineland, and territories in Westphalia. The result was a sprawling, disconnected country known as Brandenburg-Prussia that was in poor shape to defend itself during the Thirty Years' War.

Beginning near the end of that devastating conflict, however, Brandenburg enjoyed a string of talented rulers who expanded their territory and power in Europe. The first of these was Frederick William, the so-called "Great Elector", who worked tirelessly to rebuild and consolidate the nation. He moved the royal residence to Potsdam. At the Peace of Westphalia, his envoy Joachim Friedrich von Blumenthal negotiated the acquisition of several important territories such as Halberstadt. Under the Treaty of Oliva Christoph Caspar von Blumenthal (son of the above) negotiated the incorporation of the Duchy of Prussia into the Hohenzollern inheritance.

=== Kingdom of Prussia and German Empire ===
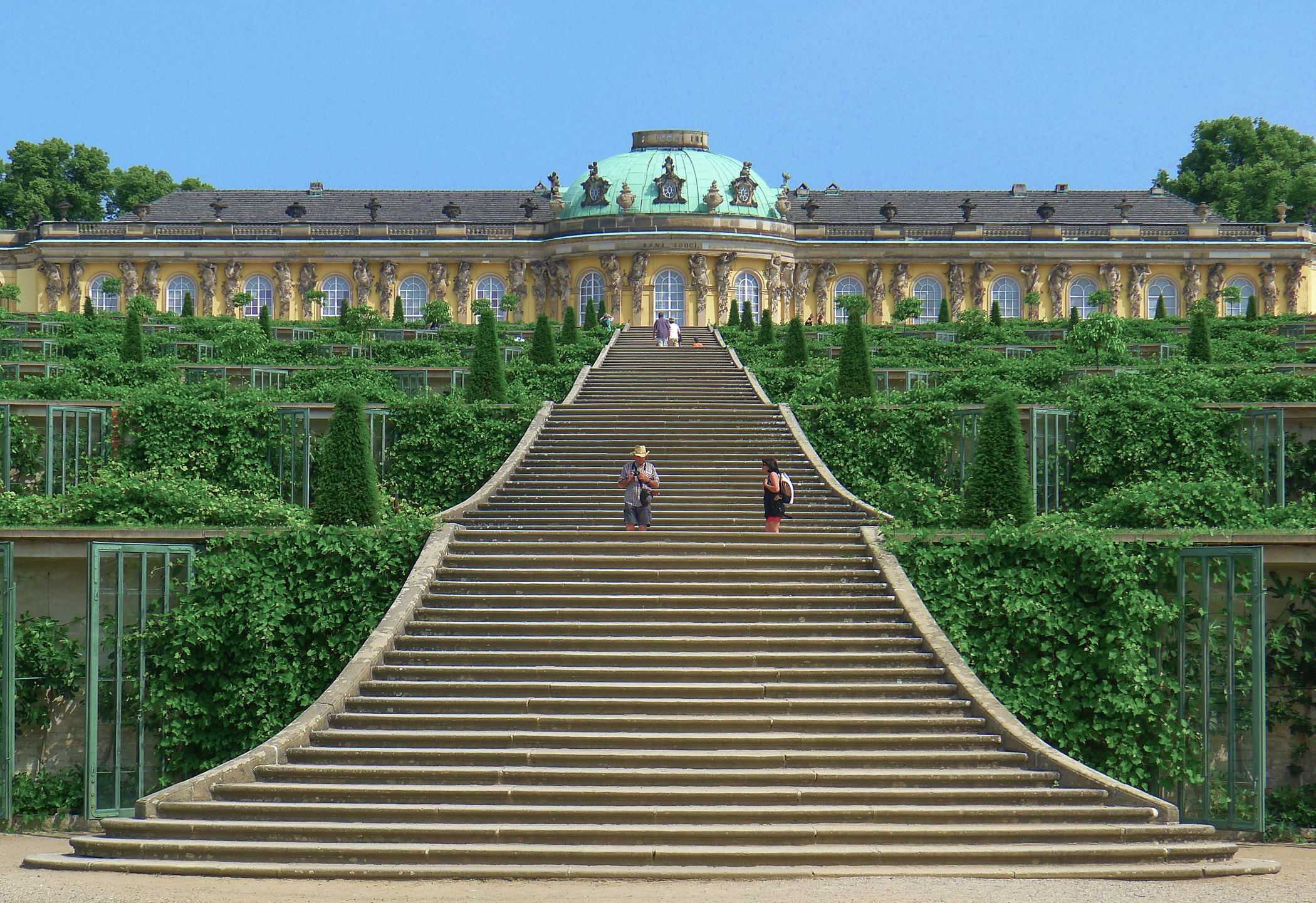
The Sanssouci Palace in Potsdam, the former summer palace of Frederick the Great, is today a World Heritage Site.

When Frederick William died in 1688, he was followed by his son Frederick, third of that name in Brandenburg. As the lands that had been acquired in Prussia were outside the boundaries of the Holy Roman Empire, Frederick assumed (as Frederick I) the title of "King in Prussia" (1701). Although his self-promotion from margrave to king relied on his title to the Duchy of Prussia, Brandenburg was still the most important portion of the kingdom. However, this combined state is known as the Kingdom of Prussia.

The Province of Brandenburg, as superimposed on modern borders

Brandenburg remained the core of the Kingdom of Prussia, and it was the site of the kingdom's capitals, Berlin and Potsdam. When Prussia was subdivided into provinces in 1815, the territory of the Margraviate of Brandenburg became the Province of Brandenburg, again subdivided into the government region of Frankfurt and Potsdam. It also included Lower Lusatia, previously ruled at various times by Poland, Bohemia, Hungary and Saxony. In 1881, the City of Berlin was separated from the province of Brandenburg. However, industrial towns ringing Berlin lay within Brandenburg, and the growth of the region's industrial economy brought an increase in the population of the province. The Province of Brandenburg had an area of 38,274 km^{2} and a population of 3,023,443 (1939).

=== Nazi Germany ===
Under the Nazi government and during World War II, the Sachsenhausen concentration camp with a network of subcamps was located in Brandenburg, and several prisoner-of-war camps, including Stalag III-A, Stalag III-B, Stalag III-C, Stalag III-D, Oflag II-A, Oflag III-A, Oflag III-B, Oflag III-C, Oflag 8 and Oflag 80 for Polish, Belgian, British, Dutch, French, Serbian, Italian, American, Czechoslovak, Soviet, Romanian, Greek, Bulgarian and other Allied POWs with numerous forced labour subcamps. In early 1945, the death marches of prisoners of various nationalities from various dissolved camps passed through the region. In the final stages of the war, it was the place of heavy fights, including the Battle of the Seelow Heights and Battle of Berlin, won by the Allied Soviet and Polish armies. After Germany's defeat, the territories of Brandenburg located east of the Oder–Neisse line were placed under Polish administration, pending a final peace settlement. The entire population of former East Brandenburg was expelled en masse. The remainder of the province became a state in the Soviet Zone of occupation in Germany when Prussia was dissolved in 1947.

=== East Germany ===
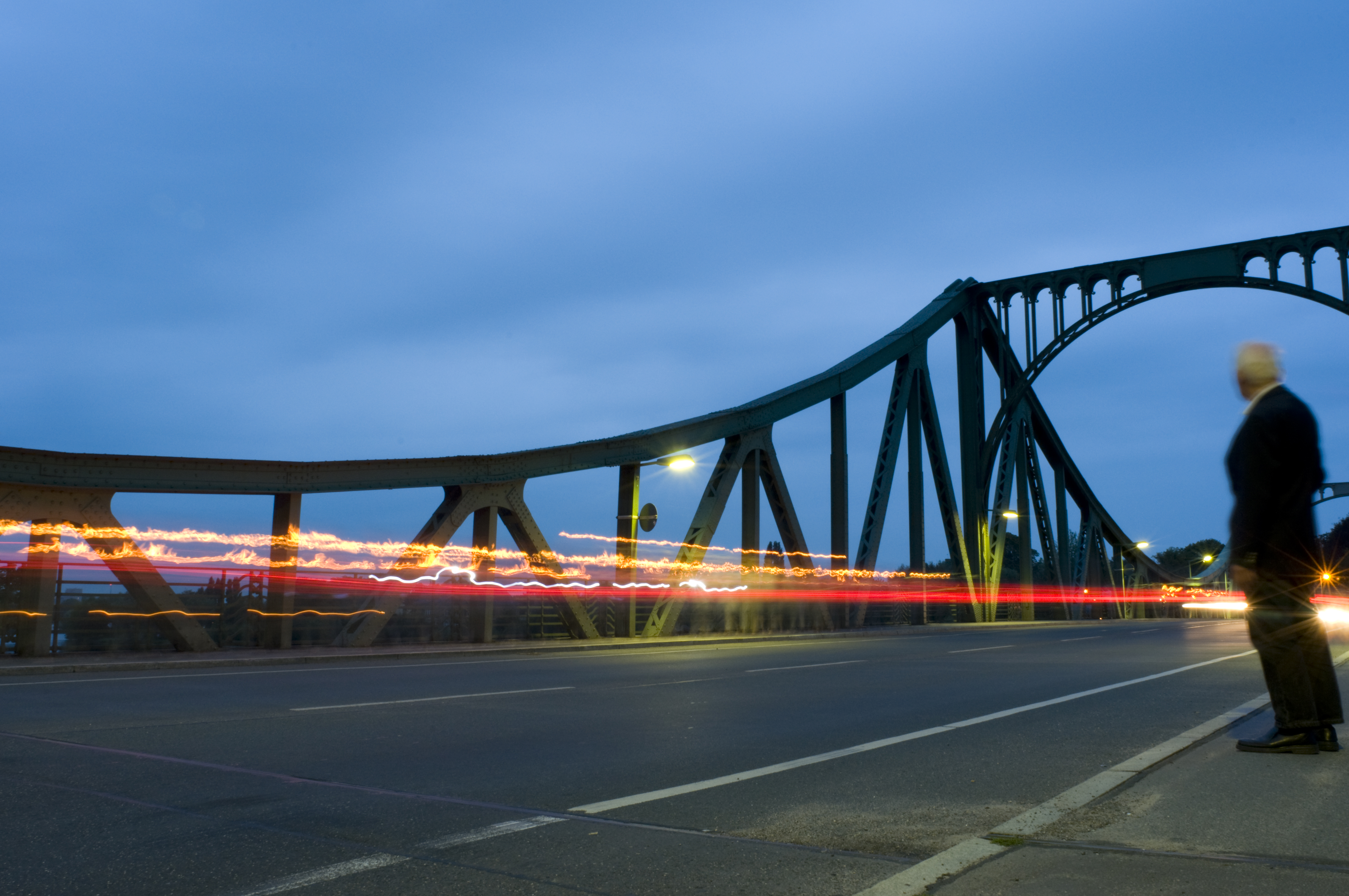
Glienicke Bridge, which connected East Germany to the American sector of West Berlin, became known for the exchange of captured spies.

After the foundation of East Germany in 1949, Brandenburg formed one of its component states. The State of Brandenburg was completely dissolved in 1952 by the Socialist government of East Germany, doing away with all component states. The East German government then divided Brandenburg among several Bezirke or districts. (See Administrative division of the German Democratic Republic). Most of Brandenburg lay within the Bezirke of Cottbus, Frankfurt, or Potsdam, but parts of the former province passed to the Schwerin, Neubrandenburg and Magdeburg districts (town Havelberg). East Germany relied heavily on lignite (the lowest grade of coal) as an energy source, and lignite strip mines marred areas of south-eastern Brandenburg. The industrial towns surrounding Berlin were important to the East German economy, while rural Brandenburg remained mainly agricultural.

=== Federal Republic of Germany ===
The present State of Brandenburg was re-established on 3 October 1990 upon German reunification.

The Landtag of Brandenburg elected on 4 October 1990 first met on 26 October 1990. As in other former parts of East Germany, the lack of modern infrastructure and exposure to West Germany's competitive market economy brought widespread unemployment and economic difficulty in the 1990s and early 2000s.In 2002, the First Schröder cabinet started the Hartz concept to lower unemployment and to improve Germany's competitiveness. In 2023, the Hartz concept was replaced by the Citizens’ Basic Income (Bürgergeld).

==== Berlin-Brandenburg fusion attempt ====
The coat of arms proposed in the interstate treaty

The legal basis for a combined state of Berlin and Brandenburg is different from other state fusion proposals. Normally, Article 29 of the Basic Law stipulates that states may only merge after a specific federal Act of Parliament is enacted. However, a clause added to the Basic Law in 1994, Article 118a, allows Berlin and Brandenburg to unify without federal approval, requiring a referendum and a ratification by both state parliaments.

In 1996, an attempt of unifying the states of Berlin and Brandenburg was rejected at referendum. Both share a common history, dialect and culture and in 2020, over 225,000 residents of Brandenburg commuted to Berlin. The fusion had the near-unanimous support by a broad coalition of both state governments, political parties, media, business associations, trade unions and churches. Though Berlin voted in favor by a small margin, largely based on support in former West Berlin, Brandenburg voters disapproved of the fusion by a large margin. It failed largely due to Brandenburg voters not wanting to take on Berlin's large and growing public debt and fearing losing identity and influence to the capital.

== Geography ==
Brandenburg is bordered by Mecklenburg-Vorpommern in the north, Poland in the east, the Freistaat Sachsen in the south, Saxony-Anhalt in the west, and Lower Saxony in the northwest.

The Oder river forms a part of the eastern border, the Elbe river a portion of the western border. The main rivers in the state itself are the Spree and the Havel. In the southeast, there is a wetlands region called the Spreewald; it is the northernmost part of Lusatia.

=== Protected areas ===
Brandenburg is known for its well-preserved natural environment and its ambitious natural protection policies which began in the 1990s. 15 large protected areas were designated following Germany's reunification. Each of them is provided with state-financed administration and a park ranger staff, who guide visitors and work to ensure nature conservation. Most protected areas have visitor centers.

National parks

- Lower Oder Valley National Park (106 km^{2})

Biosphere reserves

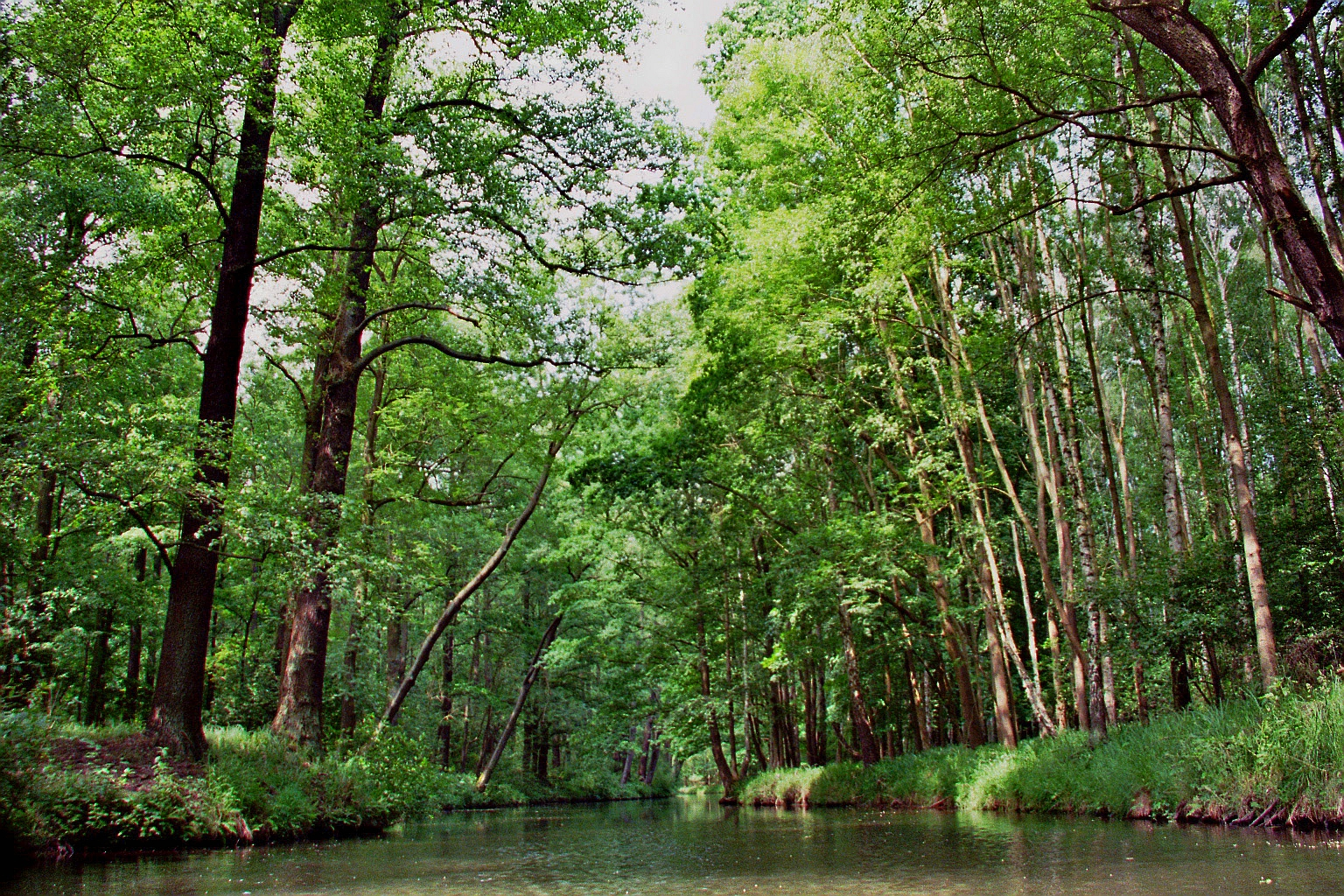
The Spreewald, a biosphere reserve by UNESCO

- Spreewald Biosphere Reserve (474 km^{2} or 183 sq mi)
- Schorfheide-Chorin Biosphere Reserve (1,291 km^{2} or 498.46 sq mi)
- River Landscape Elbe-Brandenburg Biosphere Reserve (533 km^{2} or 206 sq mi)

Nature parks

- Barnim Nature Park (750 km^{2} or 290 sq mi)
- Dahme-Heideseen Nature Park (594 km^{2} or 229 sq mi)
- High Fläming Nature Park (827 km^{2} or 319 sq mi)
- Märkische Schweiz Nature Park (204 km^{2} or 79 sq mi)
- Niederlausitzer Heidelandschaft Nature Park (490 km^{2} or 189 sq mi)
- Niederlausitzer Landrücken Nature Park (580 km^{2} or 224 sq mi)
- Nuthe-Nieplitz Nature Park (623 km^{2} or 241 sq mi)
- Schlaube Valley Nature Parke (225 km^{2} or 87 sq mi)
- Uckermark Lakes Nature Park (895 km^{2} or 346 sq mi)
- Westhavelland Nature Park (1,315 km^{2} or 507.72 sq mi)
- Stechlin-Ruppiner Land Nature Park (1,080 km^{2} or 416.99 sq mi)

== Demographics ==
Brandenburg has the second lowest population density among the German states, after Mecklenburg-Vorpommern.

Population density in Berlin-Brandenburg in 2015

=== Development ===
Development of Brandenburg's population from 1875 within current borders

Land Brandenburg: Population development
within the current boundaries (2020)

Year	Pop.	±%
1875	1,444,441	—
1890	1,578,138	+9.3%
1910	1,879,375	+19.1%
1925	2,048,866	+9.0%
1939	2,433,881	+18.8%
1950	2,746,002	+12.8%
1964	2,620,071	−4.6%

Year	Pop.	±%
1971	2,667,096	+1.8%
1981	2,667,052	−0.0%
1990	2,602,404	−2.4%
2000	2,589,504	−0.5%
2011	2,455,780	−5.2%
2022	2,534,075	+3.2%
2024	2,556,747	+0.9%

=== Religion ===
Religion in Brandenburg – 2025
Religion	Percent
None or other	84.8%
Registered EKD Protestants	11.9%
Registered Roman Catholics	3.3%

11.9% of the Brandenburgers are registered members of the local, regional Protestant church (mostly the Evangelical Church in Berlin, Brandenburg and Silesian Upper Lusatia), while 3.3% are registered with the Roman Catholic Church (mostly the Archdiocese of Berlin, and a minority in the Diocese of Görlitz). The majority (84.8%) of Brandenburgers, whether of not religious, Christian or other beliefs, choose not to register with the government as members of these churches, and therefore do not pay the church tax.

=== Foreign population ===
Significant foreign citizens populations
Nationality	Population (31 December 2023)
Ukraine	35,685
Poland	29,460
Syria	22,320
Russia	12,100
Afghanistan	12,070
Romania	8,945
Turkey	6,420
Vietnam	4,215
Bulgaria	3,815
India	3,695

== Politics ==
Politically, Brandenburg is a stronghold of the Social Democratic Party, which won the largest share of the vote and seats in every state election. All three Minister-Presidents of Brandenburg have come from the Social Democratic Party (unlike any other state except Bremen) and they even won an absolute majority of seats and every single-member constituency in the 1994 state election.

On a federal level, the Social Democratic Party has also been the strongest party in most federal elections, their strongholds being the northwestern part of the state and Potsdam and its surrounding areas. However, the Christian Democratic Union won the most votes in 1990, their 2013 landslide and in 2017. In 2009, The Left won the most votes in a year where, like in 2017, the social democrats collapsed. Prominent politicians from Brandenburg include Social Democrats Frank-Walter Steinmeier, who served in the Bundestag for Brandenburg before being elected President of Germany, and Chancellor of Germany Olaf Scholz, who sits in the Bundestag for Potsdam.

Like in all other New states of Germany, the leftist party of The Left and, more recently, the far-right Alternative for Germany are especially strong in Brandenburg.

Brandenburg has 4 out of 69 votes in the Bundesrat and, as of 2021, 25 seats out of 736 in the Bundestag.

=== Subdivisions ===
Brandenburg is divided into 14 rural districts (Landkreise) and four urban districts (kreisfreie Städte), shown with their population in 2011:

Administrative divisions of Brandenburg

District	Population
Barnim	176,953
Dahme-Spreewald	161,556
Elbe-Elster	110,291
Havelland	155,226
Märkisch-Oderland	189,673
Oberhavel	203,508
Oberspreewald-Lausitz	120,023
Oder-Spree	182,798
Ostprignitz-Ruppin	102,108
Potsdam-Mittelmark	205,678
Prignitz	80,872
Spree-Neiße	124,662
Teltow-Fläming	161,546
Uckermark	128,174
Stadt Brandenburg an der Havel	71,534
Stadt Cottbus	102,129
Stadt Frankfurt (Oder)	60,002
Stadt Potsdam	158,902

=== Government ===
==== Election of 2024 ====
Election 2024
Party	Seats	+/-	In Majority?
SPD	32	+7 ▲	government
AfD	30	+7▲	opposition
BSW	14	New	government
CDU	12	−3 ▼	opposition
Total	88		

The 2024 Brandenburg state election took place on 22 September. One important outcome of the election was that the number of parties with representation in the state parliament went from six to four. The Greens, the Left, and the Brandenburg United Civic Movements/Free Voters all lost their representation while a new party, the Sahra Wagenknecht Alliance (BSW), gained 14 votes. The BSW was formed on 8 January 2024, mostly by members who had broken away from the Left. While it shares the Left's economic outlook, it is more closely aligned with stances traditionally held by the right on certain issues. For example, the BSW is broadly anti-immigration and anti-Nato, and has been accused of having Russophile tendencies, partially based on their desire for the war in Ukraine to be ended by diplomacy.

Other German parties have generally been unwilling to work with the AfD and that trend continued with the formation of the new government based on this election. Assuming that the AfD would be in the opposition, the only two options that the SPD, with the plurality of seats, had to obtain a majority were to work with the BSW as well as the Christian Democratic Union (CDU) or to just work with the BSW. Ultimately, the latter option was chosen and a majority of 46 out of 88 seats was obtained.

While this should have been enough votes to reelect Woidke as the Minister-President, he lost the first vote, having only 43 supporters in the secret ballot. While there were only 40 votes against him (there were two abstentions and two votes that were invalid), an absolute majority, 45 votes, was required to win the first round. On 11 December, in the second round of voting, all that was needed was for Woidke to receive more votes in his favor than there were in opposition, and he won in this round with 50 votes. This meant that at least 4 members of the opposition, whether from the AfD, the CDU, or a combination of the two, had voted with the coalition government to reelect Woidke. The CDU accused the SPD of receiving help from the AfD, but it is impossible to know because the ballot was secret. The government in Brandenburg has been led by the SPD since 1990.

==== Election of 2019 ====
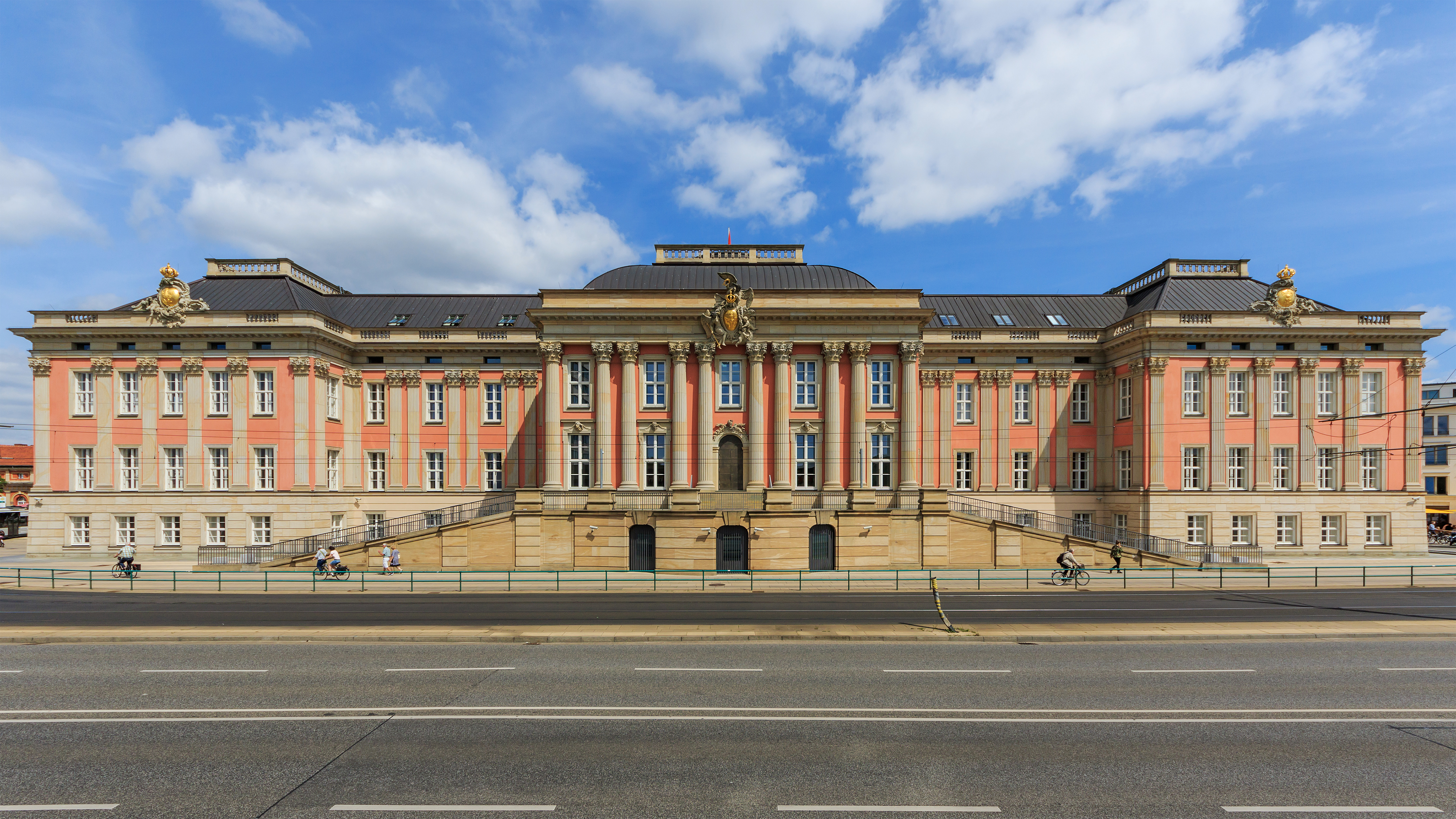
The Brandenburg parliament building (Landtag) in Potsdam, the seat of the parliament is the reconstructed Potsdam City Palace

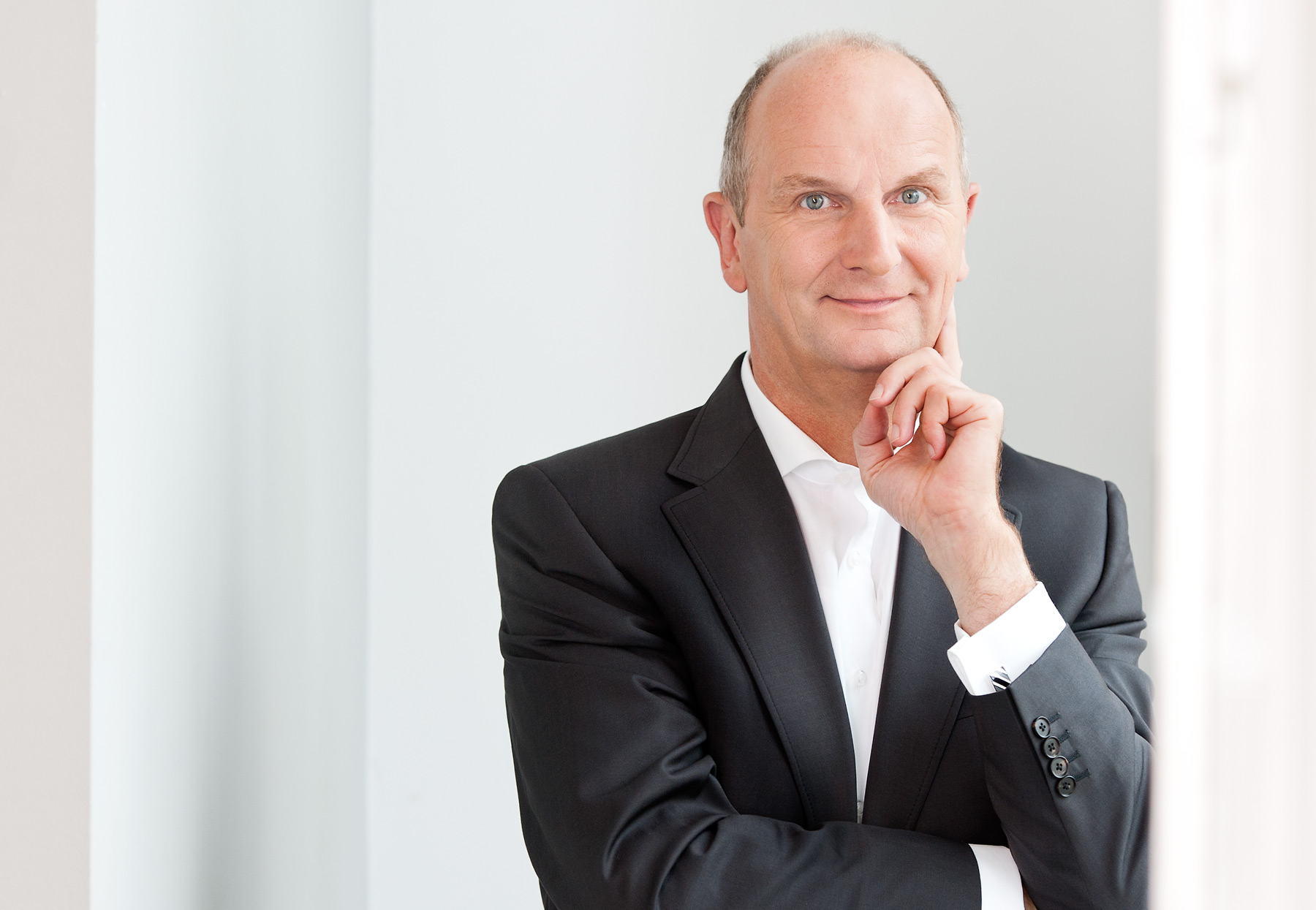
Dietmar Woidke, current Minister-President of Brandenburg

The 2019 elections took place on 1 September. A coalition government was formed by the Social Democrats, The Greens, and the Christian Democratic Union led by incumbent Minister-President Dietmar Woidke (SPD), replacing the previous coalition between the Social Democrats and The Left.

Party	Votes	%	+/-	Seats	+/-	Seats %
Social Democratic Party (SPD)	331,238	26.2	▼5.7	25	▼5	28.4
Alternative for Germany (AfD)	297,484	23.5	▲11.3	23	▲12	26.1
Christian Democratic Union (CDU)	196,988	15.6	▼7.4	15	▼6	17.0
Alliance 90/The Greens (Grüne)	136,364	10.8	▲4.6	10	▲4	11.4
The Left (Linke)	135,558	10.7	▼7.9	10	▼7	11.4
Brandenburg United Civic Movements/Free Voters (BVB/FW)	63,851	5.05	▲2.3	5	▲2	5.7
Free Democratic Party (FDP)	51,660	4.1	▲2.6	0	±0	0
Human Environment Animal Protection Party	32,959	2.6	▲2.6	0	±0	0
Pirate Party Germany (Piraten)	8,712	0.7	▼0.8	0	±0	0
Others	10,292	0.8		0	±0	0
Total	1,265,106	100.0		88	±0	
Voter turnout		61.3	▲13.4			

== Economy ==
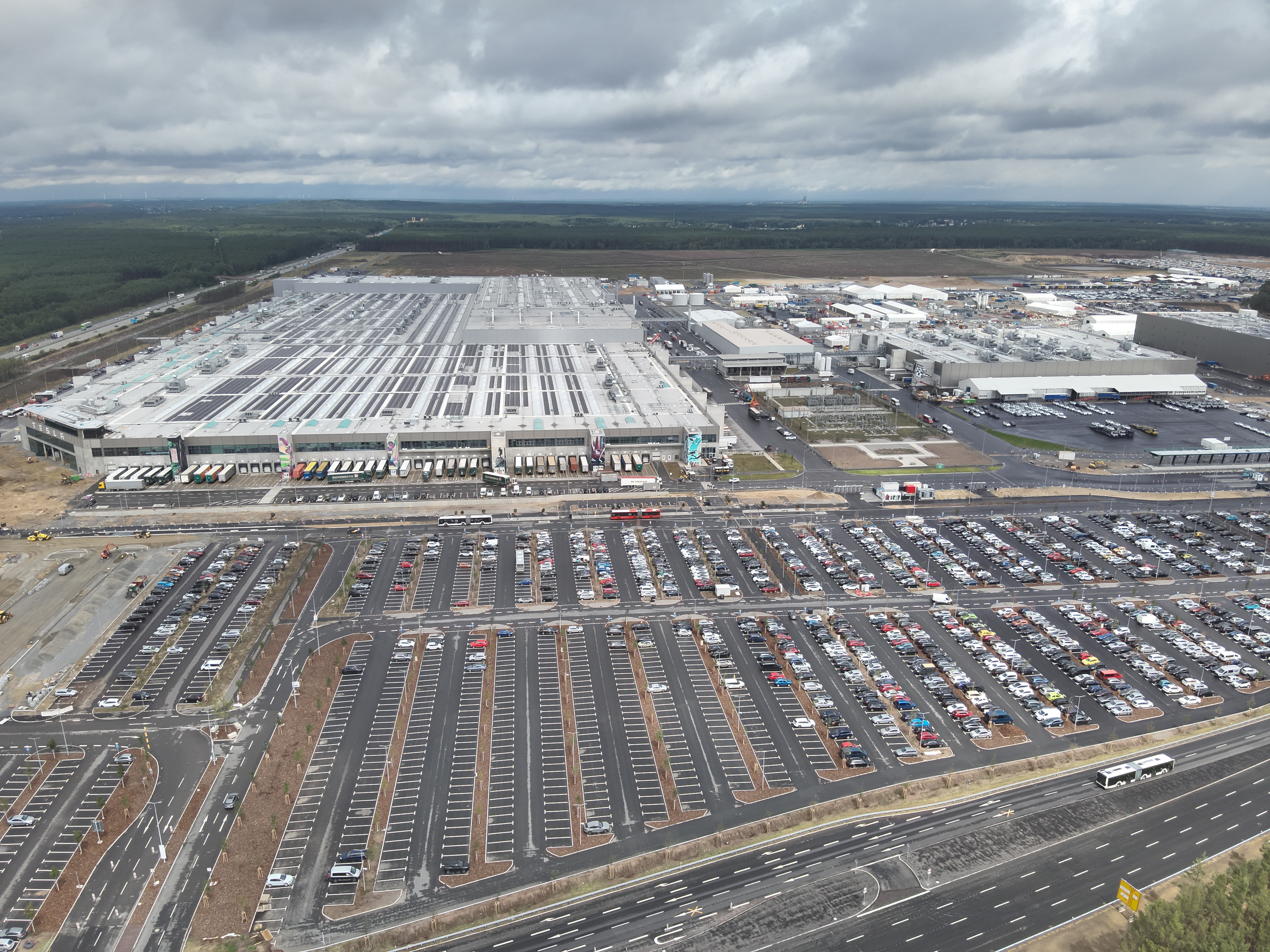
Gigafactory Berlin-Brandenburg

The gross domestic product (GDP) of the state was 72.9 billion euros in 2018, accounting for 2.2% of German economic output. GDP per capita adjusted for purchasing power was 26,700 euros or 88% of the EU27 average in the same year. The GDP per employee was 91% of the EU average. The GDP per capita was the third lowest of all states in Germany.

The unemployment rate stood at 6.1% in 2024 and was higher than the German average but lower than the average of Eastern Germany.

The industrial sector in Brandenburg is mainly characterized by small and medium‑sized enterprises. Its economy is centered on a diverse range of sectors, including metal production and processing, mechanical engineering, the plastics and chemical industries, food production, optics, photonics, vehicle manufacturing and logistics.

Tesla Gigafactory Berlin-Brandenburg is located in Brandenburg.

== Transport ==
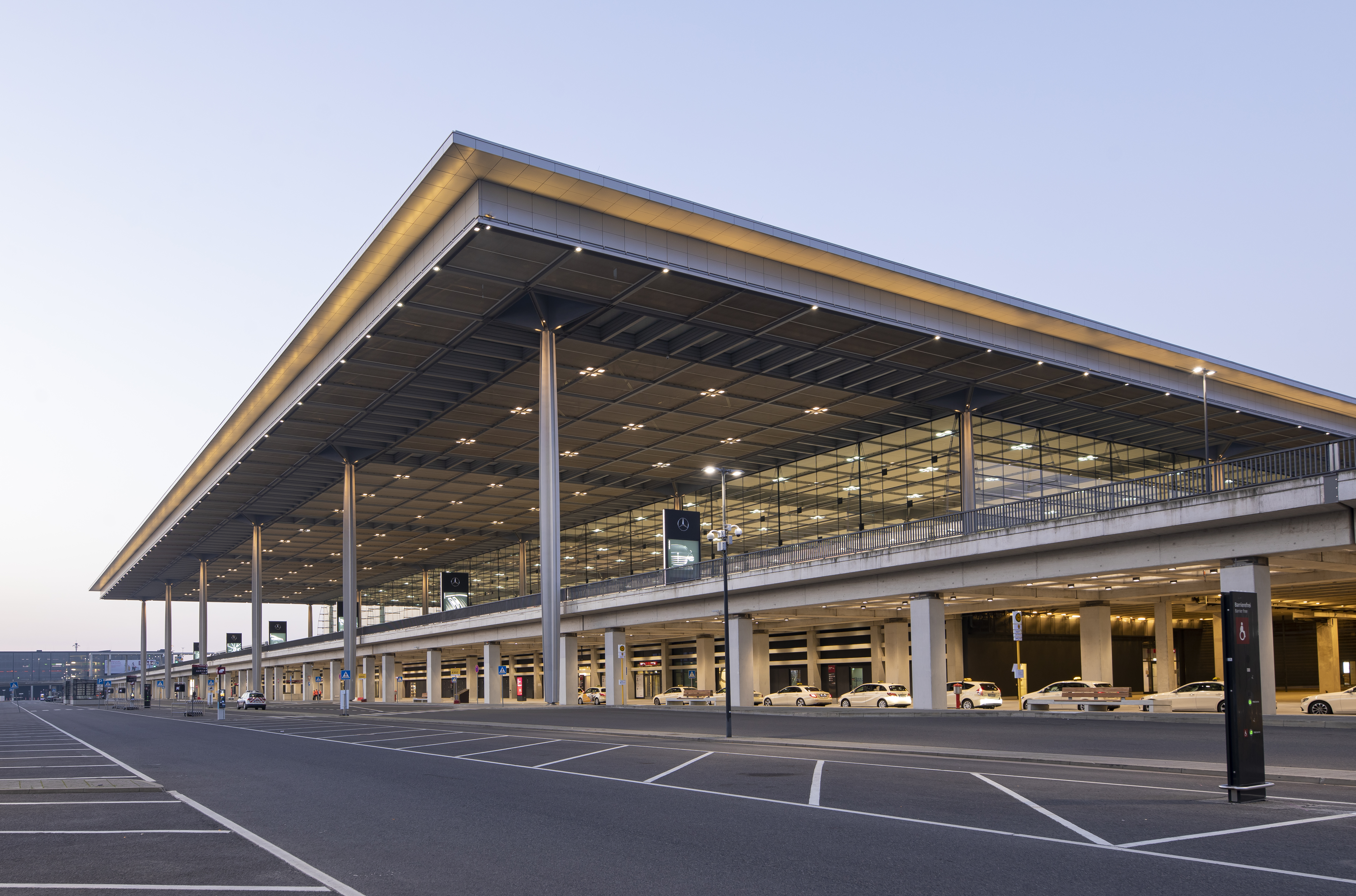
Berlin Brandenburg Airport

Berlin Schönefeld Airport (IATA code: SXF) was the largest airport in Brandenburg. It was the second largest international airport of the Berlin-Brandenburg metropolitan region and was located 18 km (11 mi) southeast of central Berlin in Schönefeld. The airport was a base for Condor, easyJet and Ryanair. In 2016, Schönefeld handled 11,652,922 passengers (an increase of 36.7%).

Schönefeld's existing infrastructure and terminals were incorporated into the new Berlin Brandenburg Airport (BER), which opened in 2020. Berlin Brandenburg Airport had an initial capacity of 35–40 million passengers a year. Due to increasing air traffic in Berlin and Brandenburg, plans for airport expansions were in the making.

Berlin Brandenburg Airport receives over sixty combined passenger, charter and cargo airlines.

== Education and research ==
=== Higher education ===
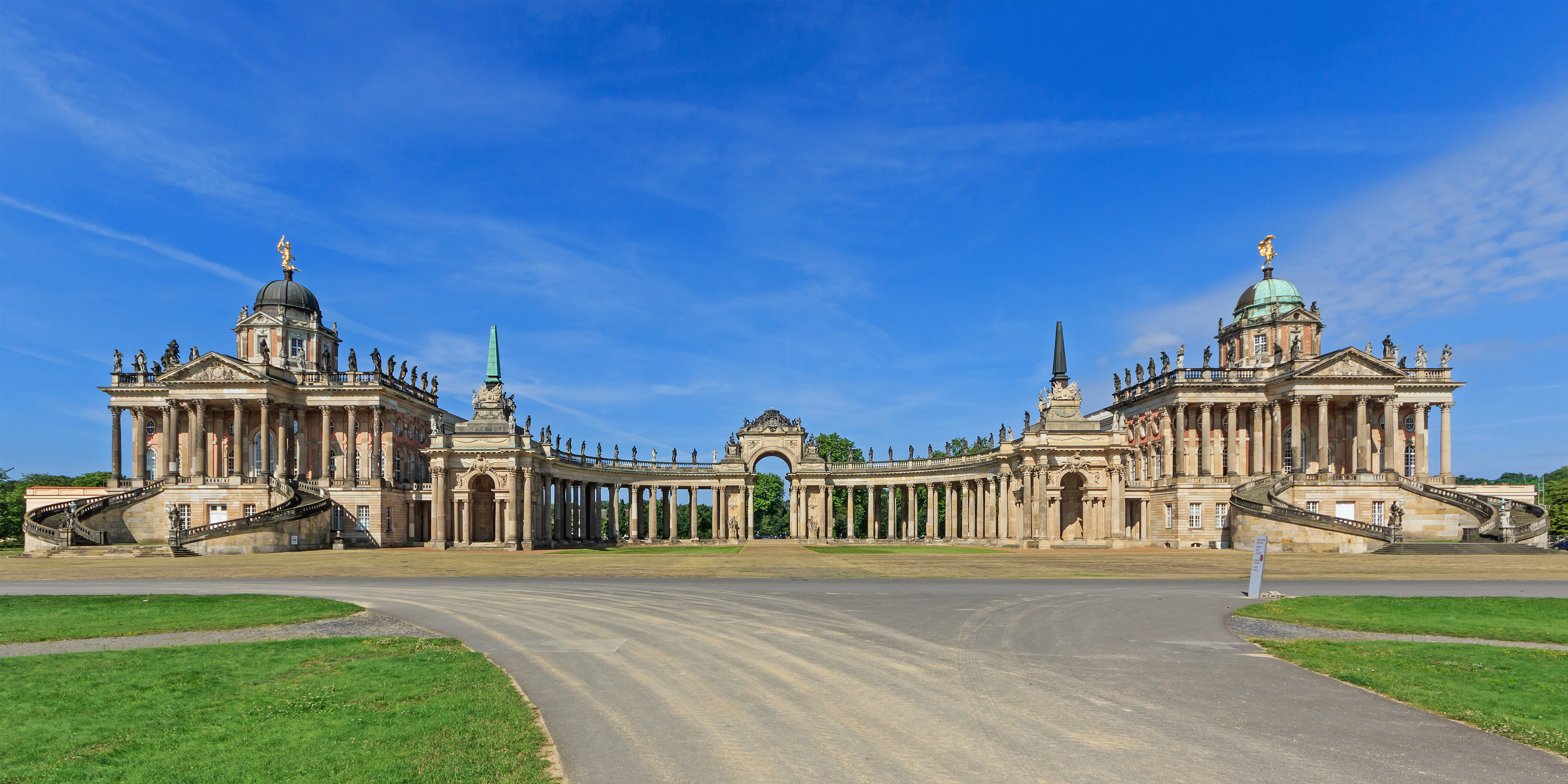
University of Potsdam

In 2016, around 49,000 students were enrolled in Brandenburg universities and higher education facilities. The largest institution is the University of Potsdam, located southwest of Berlin. In 2019 the state of Brandenburg adopted an Open Access strategy calling on universities to develop transformation strategies to make knowledge from Brandenburg freely accessible to all.

Universities in Brandenburg:

- University of Potsdam
- Brandenburg University of Technology in Cottbus and Senftenberg
- European University Viadrina in Frankfurt (Oder)
- Konrad Wolf Film University of Babelsberg
- Medizinische Hochschule Brandenburg Theodor Fontane
- Medizinische Universität Lausitz – Carl Thiem

== Culture ==
=== Music ===
The Brandenburg Concertos by Johann Sebastian Bach (original title: Six Concerts à plusieurs instruments) are a collection of six instrumental works presented by Bach to Christian Ludwig, Margrave of Brandenburg-Schwedt, in 1721 (though probably composed earlier). They are widely regarded as among the finest musical compositions of the Baroque era and are among the composer's best known works.

=== Media ===
Regional television and radio is provided by Rundfunk Berlin-Brandenburg (formerly ORB) which broadcast from Berlin. However, the network also has a studio in Potsdam located in the Babelsberg area of the city.

Local newspapers is served by:

- Märkische Allgemeine serving Potsdam and western parts of state.
- Lausitzer Rundschau covering Cottbus and southern parts of state.
- Märkische Oderzeitung covering Frankfurt (Oder) and eastern parts of state.

=== Cuisine ===
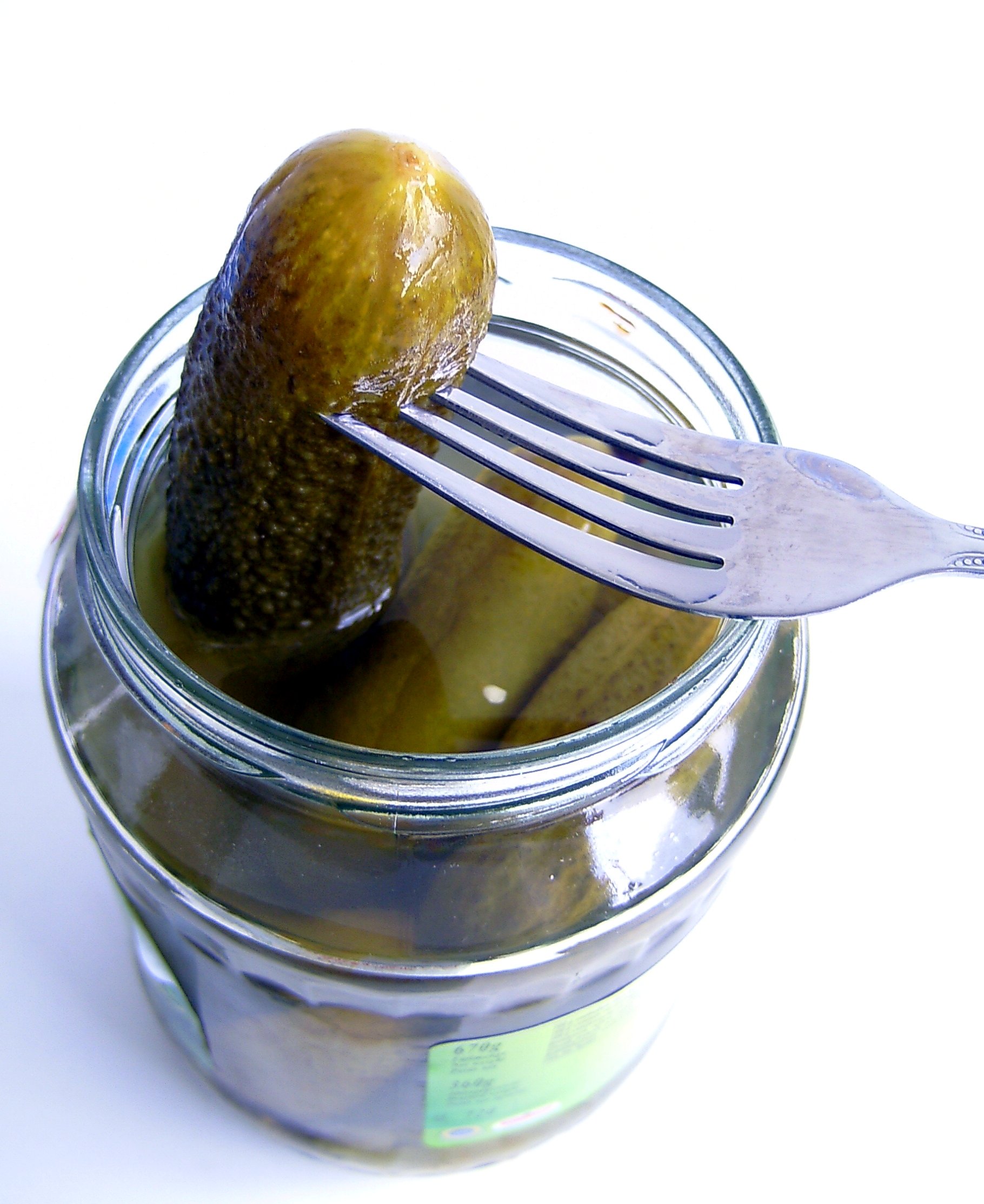
Spreewald gherkins

A famous speciality food from Brandenburg are the Spreewald gherkins. The wet soil of the Spreewald makes the region ideal for growing cucumbers. Spreewald gherkins are protected by the EU as a Protected Geographical Indication (PGI). They are one of the biggest exports of Brandenburg.

=== Notable people ===
- Wilhelm von Humboldt (1767–1835), philosopher, linguist, diplomat, and founder of the Humboldt University of Berlin
- Heinrich von Kleist (1777–1811), poet, dramatist, and novelist
- Karl Friedrich Schinkel (1781–1841), architect, city planner, and painter
- Peter Joseph Lenné (1789–1866), gardener and landscape architect
- Theodor Fontane (1819–1898), novelist and poet
- Wilhelm Pieck (1876–1960), politician, first President of the German Democratic Republic
- Kurt Demmler (1943–2009), songwriter; accused of sexual abuse he hanged himself in his jail cell.
- Wolfgang Joop (born 1944), fashion designer, founder of JOOP!
- Matthias Platzeck (born 1953), politician, Minister President of Brandenburg from 2002 to 2013
- Henry Maske (born 1964), professional boxer
- Paul van Dyk (born 1971), DJ, record producer, and musician
- Britta Steffen (born 1983), competitive swimmer, former Olympic, World, and European champion
- Robert Harting (born 1984), discus thrower, former Olympic, World, and European champion
- Roehl brothers, Charles (1857–1927) and William (1890–1968), businessmen and pioneers of Washington state.
- Mike David Ortmann (born 1999), racing driver

== See also ==
- Outline of Germany
- Former countries in Europe after 1815
