= Lower Lusatian Ridge Nature Park =

Nature park in Brandenburg, Germany

Coordinates: 51°45′40″N 13°48′19″E

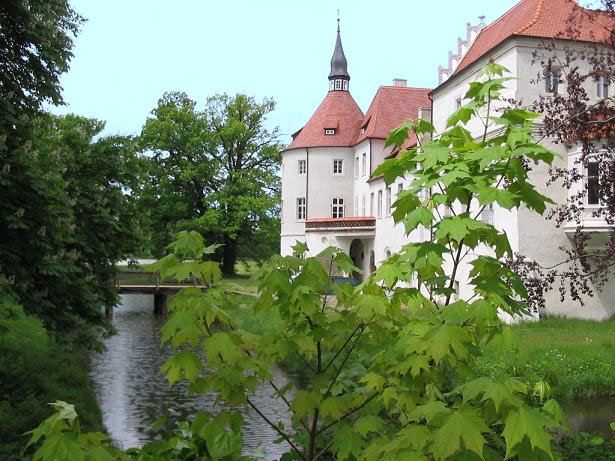

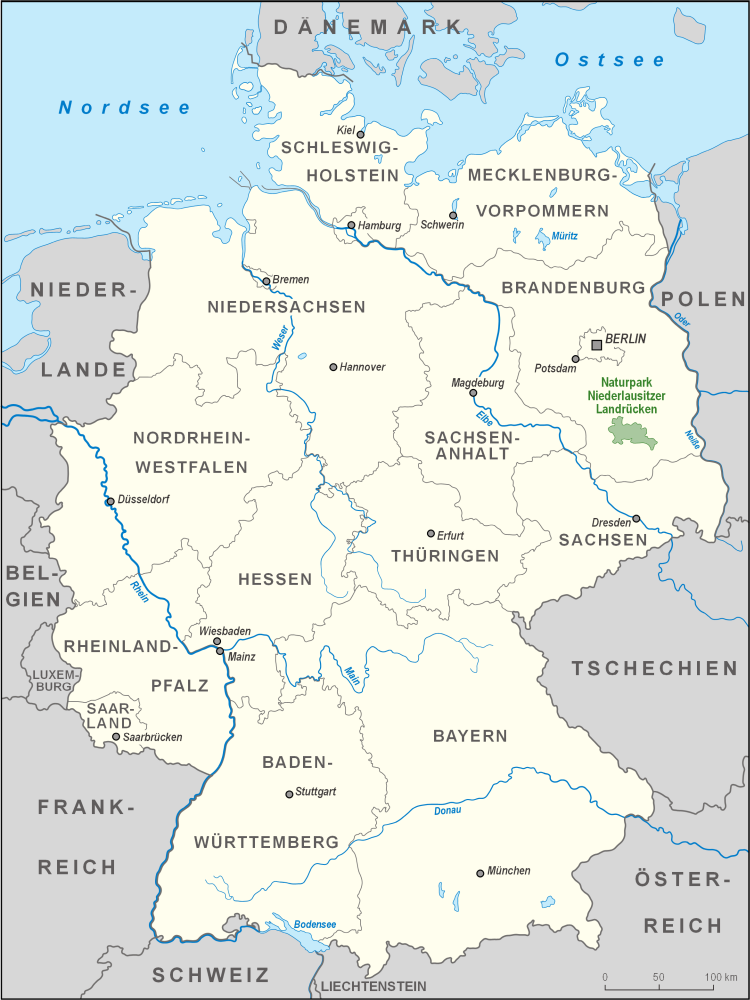

The Lower Lusatian Ridge Nature Park (German: Naturpark Niederlausitzer Landrücken; Lower Sorbian: Pśirodny park Dolnołužyski Kamm) is a nature park and reserve in the state of Brandenburg, Germany. It covers an area of 580 km^{2} (224 sq mi). It was established on September 9, 1997.
