= William Roehl =

Businessman in Washington state (1890–1968)

William F. Roehl
- Born: September 21, 1890; Brandenburg, Germany
- Died: November 23, 1968 (aged 78)
- Burial place: Bayview Cemetery, Bellingham, Washington
- Occupations: Liquor and cigar merchant; real estate businessman
- Organization: Bellingham Bay Society
- Known for: A Washington State pioneer and businessman who developed several business industries in Bellingham, Washington. He was a successful liquor and cigar merchant, and active real estate dealer of the city.
- Children: 2
- Family: Charles F. Roehl (brother)

William F. Roehl (September 21, 1890 – November 23, 1968) was a Washington state pioneer, liquor and cigar merchant, and property investor who lived in Bellingham.

Roehl came to Whatcom (later Bellingham) in 1884, joining his brother, Charles F. Roehl. Together they developed the merchandise business as liquor and cigar traders. They became one of the leading businessmen in the field, owning a number of modern liquor houses and distributing wines, cigars, and liquor. They were well known for handling high-quality whisky. They left their newly established business and the city due to the economic depression in Whatcom, which started in 1884, but returned to the city and re-entered trade in 1889. The Roehls fully retired from the mercantile business in 1902 due to new trade agreements between the U.S. and Canada.

The Roehl brothers actively participated in real estate investments and dealings, and operated property that was considered some of the best at the time. Among their properties were the Hotel Byron (later the Leopold Hotel), the Lighthouse Block in Whatcom, and the Knights of Pythias Building in Fairhaven, Washington.

In 1898, Roehl participated in the Klondike Gold Rush.

== Early life, family, and education ==
William Roehl was born in Brandenburg, Germany on September 21, 1890. He was one of six children of John Casper Roehl and Elizabeth Roehl (Kublanc), both German descendants. William's brothers were Charles F. Roehl, with whom he worked in mercantile and real estate businesses, and August, a stock raiser in Texas. Their three sisters were: Lottie, married to Peter Winter, a contractor from Bryan, Texas; Alvina, married to Max Kiesewetter from Beaumont, Texas; and Minnie, married to Fred Viereck, with whom she had five children.

The Roehl family moved from Germany to America and settled in Texas. William's father, John Casper, died there in 1896, and his mother, Elizabeth, died in 1902.

William spend his childhood and went to school in Texas. He lived there until his brother Charles invited him to start the business in Whatcom, Washington (later Bellingham, Washington).

== Career ==
=== Trade attempt in Washington, and San Diego investments ===
In 1884, William joined his brother Charles in Whatcom, Washington (later Bellingham), becoming one of the pioneers of the city. The brothers started their career as wholesale and retail merchants after purchasing a stock of alcohol in San Francisco.

At the time the Roehls developed their business, Whatcom was growing rapidly, primarily due to the plans to connect its railroad line to Canada in Sumas, Washington. The connection was later declined by the Canadian government, and Whatcom experienced an economic depression. The Roehls were forced to close their business, and decided to wait out the crisis. They left the city separately.

In 1886, William Roehl went to Vancouver, British Columbia, and worked there for a year. In 1887, he re-joined his brother in San Diego, California. They started making investments into the city's development, but were unsuccessful.

=== Trading business restart in Whatcom, Washington ===
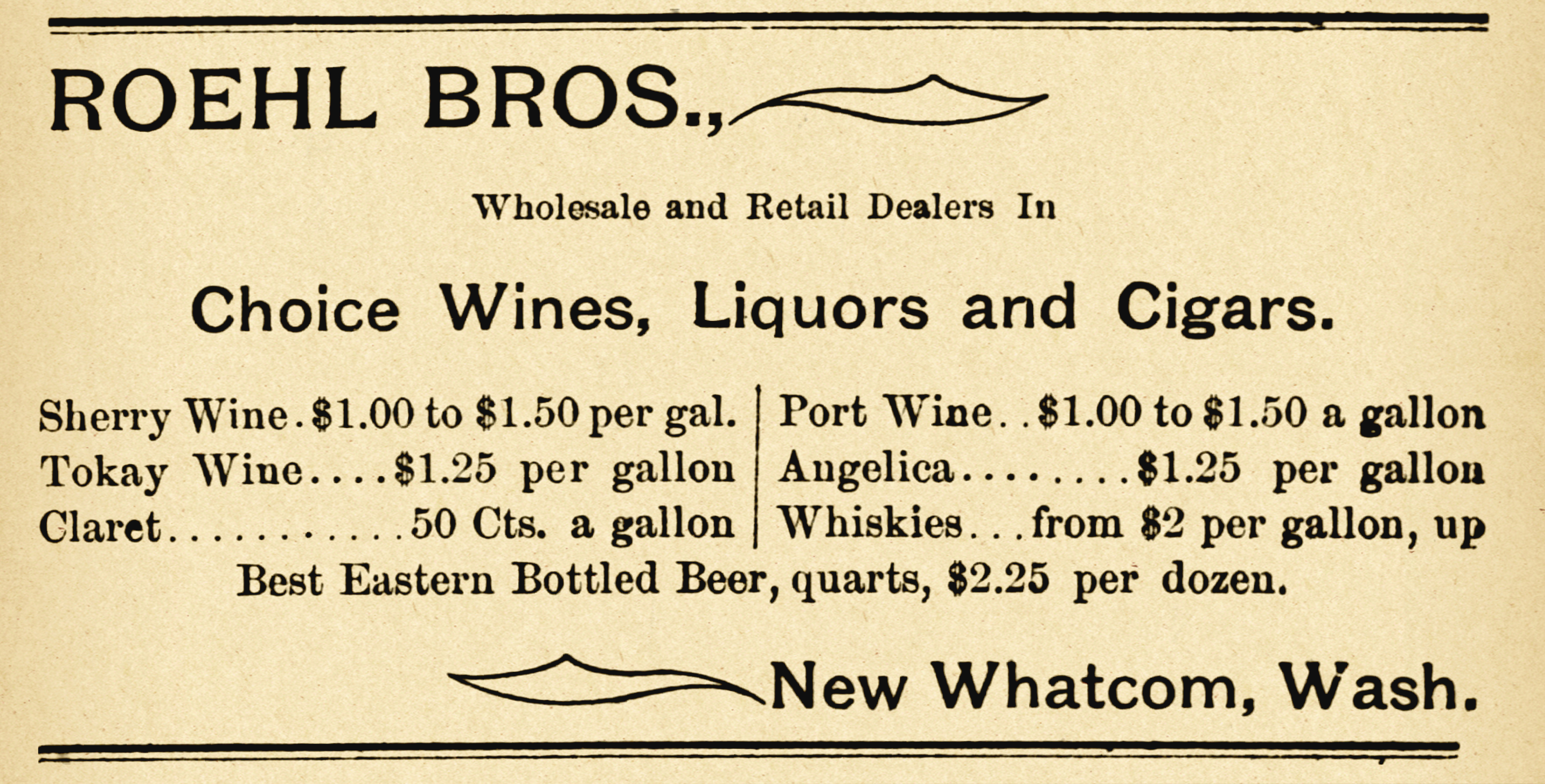
Roehl Bros. advertisement, 1886

In 1889, the Roehl brothers returned to Whatcom and reopened their business as wine, liquor and cigar merchants. They became leading industry figures of their city, well known for handling high-quality whisky.

For four years, the brothers conducted a liquor house (at the time in Washington State, typically a point of wholesale for alcohol) in the Lighthouse Block, at the corner of Holly and Dock Streets. In 1900, they sold it to the Capital Brewing Co. Meanwhile, they had already started the process of establishing a new, "up to date and modern" liquor house in the Byron House. This establishment contained a bar, billiard hall, and private card room; the whole property's size was 27 ft × 110 ft (8.2 m × 33.5 m).

In 1902, trade disagreements between the U.S. and Canada led to stronger enforcement of the tariff act of July 24, 1897. The new rulings resulted in confiscation of liquor shipments. Among others, one of Roehls' shipments, going from Victoria, British Columbia to Whatcom, was seized.

=== Real estate dealings ===
In 1902, the Roehl brothers retired from liquor business, dedicating all of their time to their real estate dealings. They actively purchased, sold, and rented "some of the best property in the town," earning good profit.

The brothers erected a two-story brick building sized 50 ft × 70 ft (15 m × 21 m) on Dock Street for rental purposes, rented two brick buildings on Holly street, owned a Knights of Pythias Building in Fairhaven, Washington and much residential property around Whatcom city.

Among the Roehl brothers' real estate deals were the selling of the Hotel Byron (later the Leopold Hotel), to businessmen Charles Wright and M. C. Dickinson, and the Lighthouse Block purchase in 1902. Under the Roehl's management, the Lighthouse Block was modified into an office building and equipped with steam heat and a magnetic elevator, the first in the city. They owned the building for six years, until it was sold to the First National Bank of Bellingham in 1908.

William Roehl retired from active business in 1906, but continued to supervise his investments and make occasional real estate deals until at least 1929.

=== Other activity ===
Besides his business activity, Roehl was an active citizen and a member of the Bellingham Bay Society.

In 1898, Roehl participated in the Klondike Gold Rush. He traveled by the steamship Queen to the gold digger's departure point, Dyea, Alaska. He travelled to Dawson City, Yukon, the center of gold fields. The situation, accommodations, and spirits there were deplorable, as described by one of the Roehl's companions in a letter.

== Personal life ==
Roehl married Elizabeth E. Geulich on October 1, 1908. Like him, she was a German descendant from Baden, Germany, who had come to America with her parents as a child. William and Elizabeth had two sons: Henry John, born on September 12, 1909; and Carl Francis, born on January 15, 1913. William Roehl died on November 23, 1968.

== See also ==
- Charles F. Roehl
- Leopold Hotel
- Klondike Gold Rush
- Knights of Pythias

== Literature cited ==
Laws of Washington territory, Olympia: C.B. Bagley, 1881, LCCN 37009329, OCLC 83683698
"Roehl Bros.", The Islander, Friday Harbor: J.C. Wheeler, p. 3, December 17, 1896, ISSN 2333-844X, LCCN 88085189, OCLC 17347706
"Queen departs today", Seattle Post-Intelligencer, Seattle: Leigh S. J. Hunt, pp. 1–2, July 23, 1897, ISSN 2379-7304, LCCN sn83045604, OCLC 9563195
"Whatcom klondikers' letters", Seattle Post-Intelligencer, Seattle: Leigh S. J. Hunt, p. 6, January 8, 1898, ISSN 2379-7304, LCCN sn83045604, OCLC 9563195
"Bellingham Bay Society", Seattle Post-Intelligencer, Seattle: Leigh S. J. Hunt, p. 15, July 2, 1899, ISSN 0745-970X, OCLC 3734418
Blethen, Alden J., ed. (June 23, 1900), "A fine record", Seattle Daily Times, Seattle: The Seattle Times Company, p. 14, ISSN 2639-4898, LCCN sn86072007, OCLC 1765328
Blethen, Alden J., ed. (March 7, 1902), "Liquors are held", Seattle Daily Times, Seattle: The Seattle Times Company, p. 2, ISSN 2639-4898, LCCN sn86072007, OCLC 1765328
Blethen, Alden J., ed. (December 29, 1902), "Not yet clear", Seattle Daily Times, Seattle: The Seattle Times Company, p. 4, ISSN 2639-4898, LCCN sn86072007, OCLC 1765328
"Bellingham property on East Holly street sold for good price", Seattle Daily Times, Seattle: The Seattle Times Company, p. 29, June 5, 1929, ISSN 2639-4898, LCCN sn86072007, OCLC 1765328
"Building was Cornwall's commercial beacon", Bellingham Business Journal, Everett: Sound Publishing Inc., August 31, 2005
Hunt, Herbert; Kaylor, Floyd C. (1917), Washington, west of the Cascades; historical and descriptive; the explorers, the Indians, the pioneers, the modern, Chicago: S. J. Clarke Publishing Company, LCCN 18015511, OCLC 10086413
Prosser, William Farrand (1903), Lewis, Edward Gardner (ed.), A history of the Puget Sound country, its resources, its commerce and its people, New York City: Edward Gardner Lewis, LCCN 05013767
