= Elisabeth Röhl =

German politician (1888–1930)

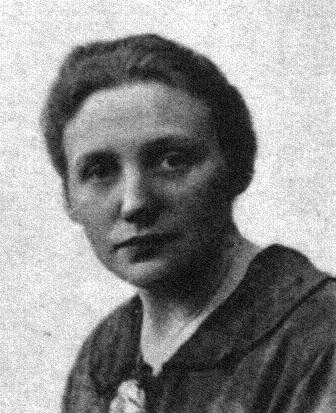
- Röhl c. 1919

Member of the Landtag of Prussia for Cologne–Aachen
- In office 10 March 1921 – 21 September 1930
- Preceded by: Multi-member district
- Succeeded by: Multi-member district

Member of the National Assembly for Cologne–Aachen
- In office 6 February 1919 – 21 May 1920
- Preceded by: Office established
- Succeeded by: Office abolished

Personal details
- Born: August 22, 1888 Landsberg an der Warthe, Province of Brandenburg, German Empire
- Died: September 21, 1930 (aged 42) Cologne, Rhine Province, Weimar Germany
- Party: SPD
- Spouse(s): _____ Röhl (m. 1907) Emil Kirschmann (m. 1922)
- Children: 1
- Relatives: Marie Juchacz (sister)
- Occupation: Politician

Elisabeth Röhl; née Elisabeth Gohlke (22 August 1888 – 21 September 1930) was a German politician, social reformer and women's rights activist. She served as a member of the National Assembly from 1919 to 1920, and as a member of the Landtag of Prussia from 1921 until her death in 1930.

Her older sister was Marie Juchacz, with whom she collaborated politically. Her second marriage was to fellow politician Emil Kirschmann, as a result of which sources after 1922 generally identify her as Elisabeth Kirschmann-Röhl.

== Life and politics ==
Elisabeth Röhl was born in Landsberg an der Warthe, the daughter of a carpenter called Theodor Gohlke and his wife Henriette. Her elder sister was Marie Juchacz. Their childhood was marked by rural poverty.

After successful completion of her education at the local school Röhl undertook an apprenticeship in dressmaking. She was active in the Association of Tailors and Dressmakers. During the First World War, Elisabeth Röhl worked, together with Anna Maria Schulte, Else Meerfeld and her sister, Marie Juchacz, with the "Home Work Centre" (Heimarbeitszentrale). This involved setting up sewing centres to give women the opportunity to work from home, along with other support for war widows and orphans. She was also a member of the so-called Food Commission (Lebensmittelkommission) which set up and operated soup kitchens.

Back row from left: Elisabeth Röhl next to Clara Bohm-Schuch (June 1, 1919)

On 6 February 1919 Elisabeth Röhl and her sister were two of the 36 women elected to the Weimar National Assembly. The national election, which had taken place on 19 January 1919 had been the first in Germany in which women had been entitled to vote. On 16 July 1919 she spoke in the National assembly to demand the equalisation of the status and rights of illegitimate with those of legitimate children, and equivalent demands in respect of unmarried and married mothers.

She is quoted on the cover of E.D. Morel's Black Horror on the Rhine from a speech she made in the Reichstag: "We appeal to the women of the world to support us in our protest against the utterly unnatural occupation by coloured troops of German districts along the Rhine."

Unlike her sister, Elisabeth was not re-elected to what had now become the Reichstag at the next election, in June 1920. She sat as a member of the Prussian Landtag (regional parliament) between 1921 and her sudden death in 1930.

== Family ==
Elisabeth Röhl was twice married and had a son by her first marriage. She married secondly, in 1922, Emil Kirschmann who was a member of the national Reichstag between 1924 and 1933.

Elisabeth's sister, Marie Juchacz, was devastated by Elisabeth's unexpected death.

"...the constant comradeship with Elisabeth [was] the most powerful force in my life"

Marie Juchacz

“...das ständige kameradschaftliche Zusammensein mit Elisabeth [war] die am stärksten wirkende Kraft in meinem Leben.”

Marie Juchacz

Elisabeth's sister, more than nine years her senior, was Marie Juchacz. They lived together in Berlin after moving there from the countryside in 1908 and when work commitments required Maria to relocate to Cologne her children stayed behind to be looked after by their aunt, Elisabeth. A couple of years later it was Elisabeth who relocated, in order to join her sister in Cologne. The sisters were also closely aligned politically, and worked together on several political books during the 1920s. According to one source, following Elisabeth's death, which came suddenly and unexpectedly in 1930, her sister and widower married one another.

== See also ==
- Feminism
