= Leopold Hotel =

- U.S. National Register of Historic Places
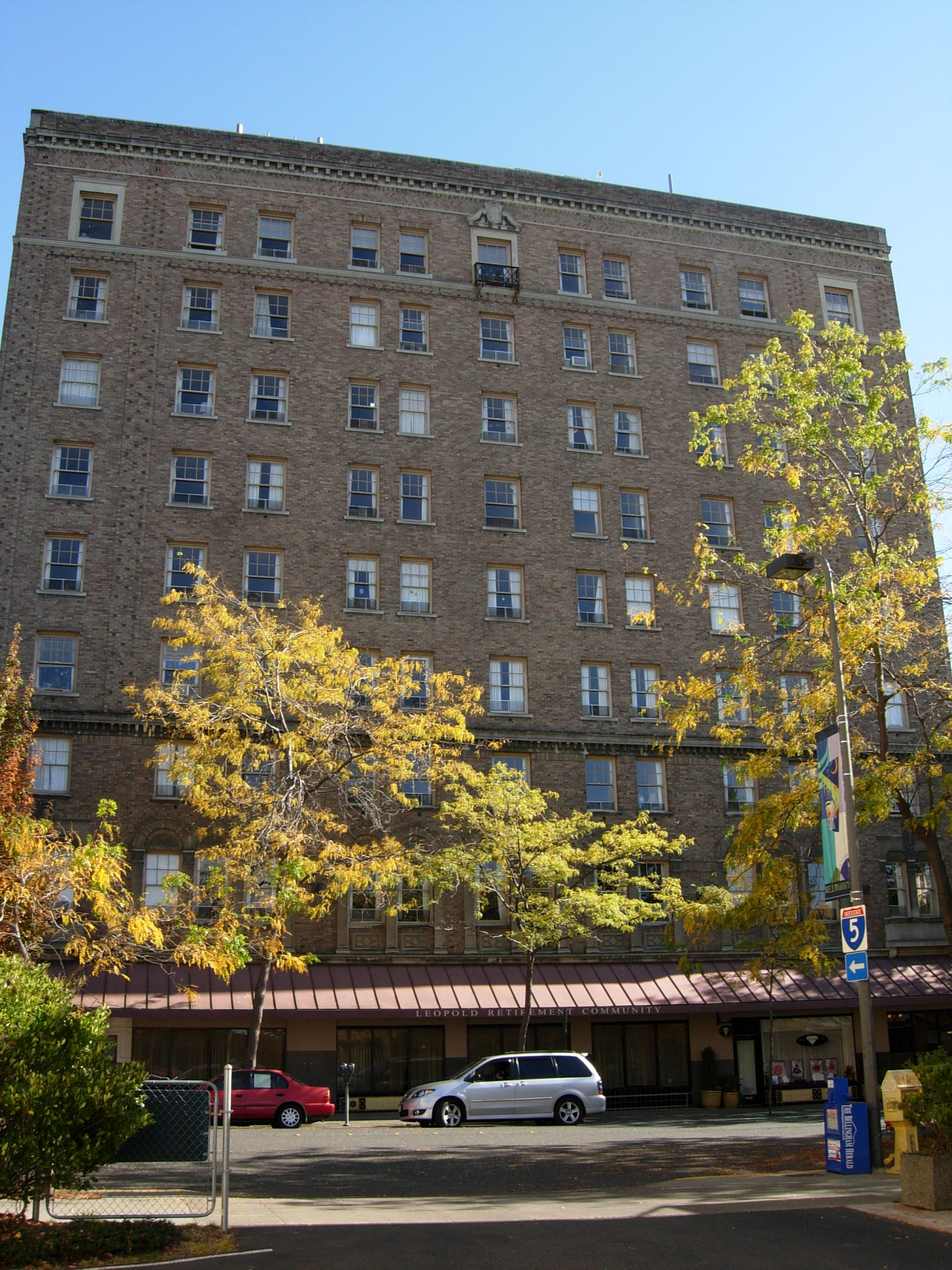

- Location within Washington (state)
- Location: 1224 Cornwall Ave., Bellingham, Washington
- Coordinates: 48°44′57″N 122°28′43″W
- Area: less than one acre
- Built: 1929
- Architect: Stevens, H.L., Co.
- Architectural style: Mission Revival
- NRHP reference No.: 82004306
- Added to NRHP: February 19, 1982

The Leopold Hotel is a historic hotel structure in Bellingham, Washington. The surviving wings were constructed in 1929 and 1967. It is currently used as a combination apartment building and hotel.

== History ==
The first hotel on the site, the Byron House Hotel, was founded in 1899 and named for its builder, Captain Josiah B. Byron. Byron owned the 93-room hotel, later known as the Hotel Byron, until 1910, when Leopold F. Schmidt (founder of the Olympia Brewing Company and owner of the Bellingham Bay Brewery) purchased the Byron for $100,000. The hotel was the occasional home of noted Alaskan artist Sydney Laurence. Unable to pay his bill in cash, Laurence instead traded Schmidt paintings for his room. To this day, the Schmidt family has one of the largest private collections of his work.

Schmidt constructed a 200-room addition to the Hotel Byron, which opened in May 1913. He died in the hotel on September 24, 1914. Its name was soon changed to the Hotel Leopold as a token of appreciation by the hotel's investors.

The current 9-story hotel tower was constructed in 1929, on the site of the original 1899 structure, which was demolished. The tower was designed by architects from H.L. Stevens & Company, of San Francisco, and increased the hotel's room count to 300.

The hotel was one of the founding members of Western Hotels on August 27, 1930, and remained part of the chain until October 10, 1969.

In 1960, the hotel added a small motel wing (since demolished) directly behind the 1929 tower, with an outdoor pool, and became the Leopold Hotel and Motor Inn.

In 1967, the 1913 wing was demolished and replaced with a 48-room, 4-story motel wing and the hotel was renamed the Leopold Inn.

The hotel left Western International Hotels in 1969.

In the 1980s, The Leopold was converted to a retirement home and underwent a significant renovation.

The Leopold was added to the National Register of Historic Places on February 19, 1982.

In December, 2018, the Leopold ceased operation as a retirement home.

In April 2019 plans were announced to restore the building, with residential apartments in the historic 1929 wing and a boutique hotel in the adjoining 1967 motel wing, named Hotel Leo.

The Hotel Leo opened in November in 2019, with 31 rooms in the motel wing and nine rooms in the historic tower. The hotel shares the historic lobby and ballroom and includes a gym, rec room, and library.
