= House of Coligny =

French noble family

Coligny
- Country: Kingdom of France
- Titles: Duke of Coligny and Châtillon; Duke of Coligny and Coligny le Neuf; Duke of Châtillon; Count of Coligny le Neuf; Count of Laval; Count of Saligny; Marquis of Coligny le Vieux; Marquis d'Andelot; Marquis of Saint Bris; Baron of Coligny le Neuf; Baron of Cressia; Baron of Saligny
- Estates: Buenc, Cuchet, Saint-Denis, Varey
- Cadet branches: de Saligny de Cressia de Laval

The House of Coligny was the name of an old and important French noble family, originating from the Bresse region of France. The head of the family held the title Duke of Châtillon, created in 1643. Their bloodline ended in 1694.

This family produced two Marshals of France, a Lieutenant-General of the French infantry, two Admirals, a Cardinal, Bishop of Beauvais, and an Archbishop of Lyon.

== History ==
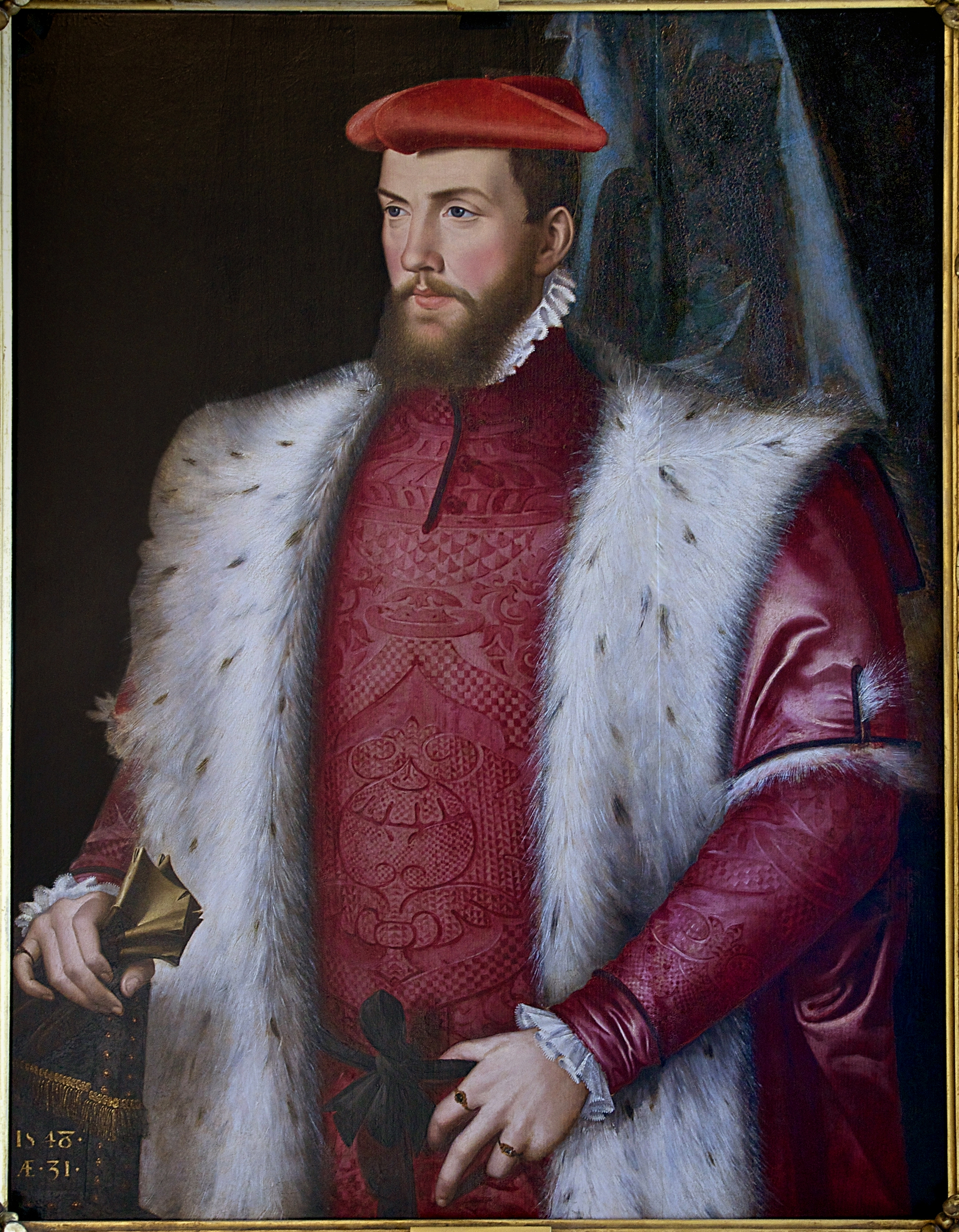
Portrait of Cardinal Odet de Coligny, attributed to François Clouet, c. 1548

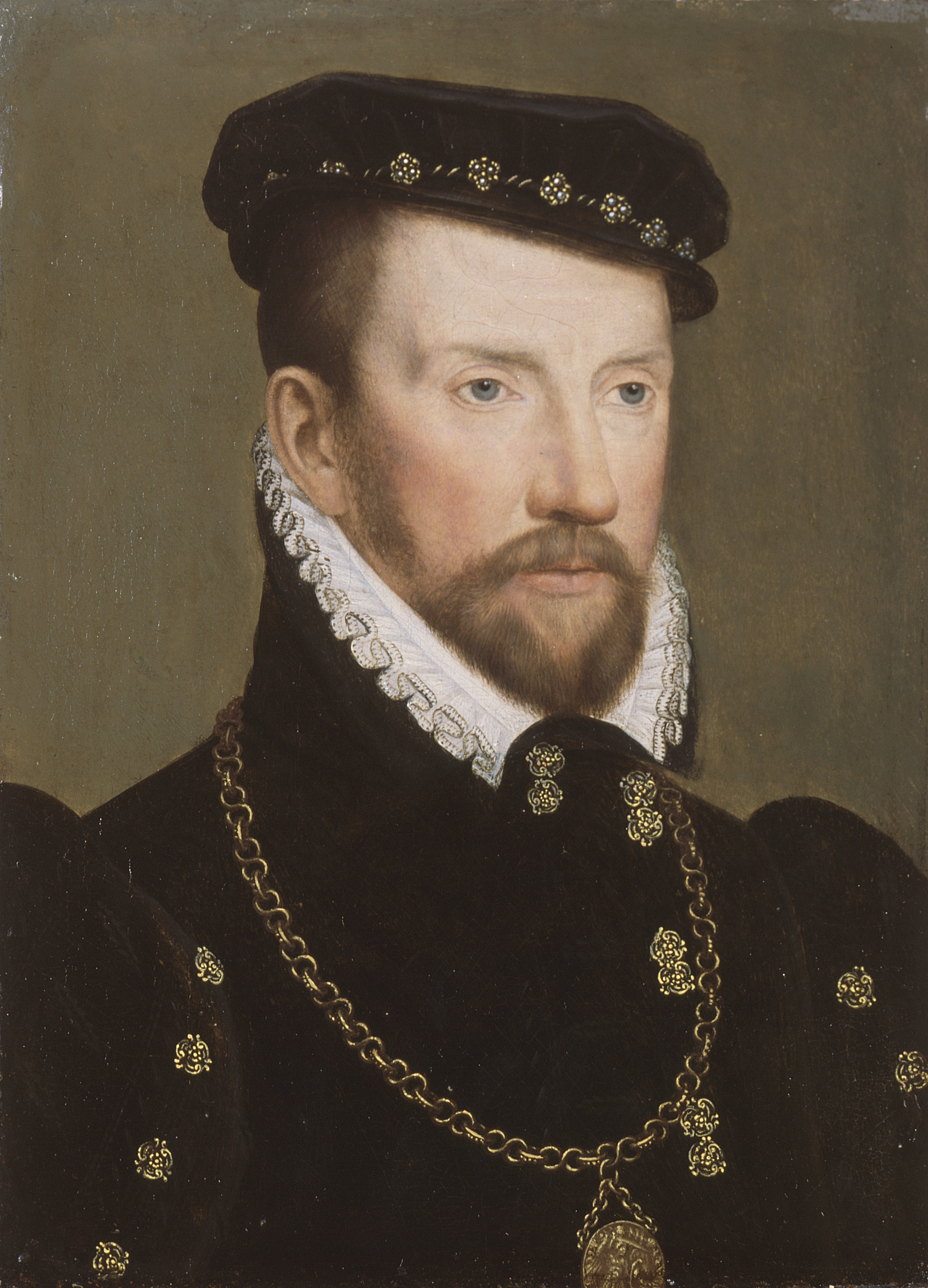
Portrait of Gaspard II de Coligny by François Clouet, between 1565 and 1570

The possessions of the Coligny family probably arose in the 10th century from the break-up of the pagus (rural subdivision of a tribal territory) of Bresse, which was commonly called the Manche des Coligny. In the 13th century, it was already referred to as "the old Manche des Coligny". A town in Revermont, Coligny was located on the borders of two principalities of the Holy Roman Empire: the County of Burgundy in the region of Franche-Comté (for the northern part, or Coligny-le-Vieux: in the department of Jura; later the Marquisate of Coligny); and the Savoyard state (for the southern part, or Coligny-le-Neuf: in the department of Ain; later the County, and then Duchy, of Coligny).

The rule of inheritance in this family is the transmission of land to both male and female descendants: this will lead to the fragmentation of the original territory with a multitude of territorial and banal fiefs.

== Notable members ==
Members of the family include:

- Hugues de Coligny (d. 1205), knight and lord of Coligny-le-Neuf and other lordships, military commander and landholder in Greece after the Fourth Crusade, killed in the Battle of Serres
- Gaspard I de Coligny (c. 1465–1522), Count of Coligny, Lord of Châtillon, known as the Marshal of Châtillon
- Odet de Coligny (1517–1571), French cardinal of Châtillon, bishop of Beauvais
- Gaspard II de Coligny (1519–1572), Lord of Châtillon, admiral of France and Protestant leader
- François de Coligny d'Andelot (1521–1569), one of the leaders of French Protestantism during the French Wars of Religion
- François de Coligny (1557–1591), Count of Coligny and Lord of Châtillon-sur-Loing, a Protestant general during the Wars of Religion
- Charles de Coligny (1564–1632), Marquis of Coligny-le-Vieux, Andelot and Saint-Bris, Baron of Lantry and Lord of Dinteville, Dannemarie, Auxon and Cusey.
- Gaspard III de Coligny (1584–1646), Count of Coligny and Lord of Châtillon-sur-Loing, then Duke of Coligny, Marquis d'Andelot, Peer of France and Marshal of France (1622), a Protestant general
- Jean de Coligny-Saligny (1617–1686), French nobleman and army commander

== Possessions ==
=== Lands and titles of Revermont ===
The House of Coligny owned, under different titles, the various parts of the land of Coligny, shared between the descendants of the Lords of Coligny, in particular:

- the branch of the Lords of Coligny-le-Vieux (the younger branch, from the younger brother of Hugues de Coligny: Humbert III (d. 1211)). This land became the marquisate of Coligny (northern part of the land of Coligny)
- the branch of the Lords of Coligny-le-Neuf (first the elder branch, descended from Hugues de Coligny (d. 1205), eldest son of Humbert II; the younger branch acquired it in 1540 with Louise de Montmorency, wife of Marshal Gaspard I, and in 1563 with their son Admiral Gaspard II). This land, the barony of Coligny, became the county of Coligny, then the second duchy of Coligny from 1648 to 1657 (southern part of the land of Coligny).

The different titled lands of Coligny are therefore:

- the duchies of Coligny (Coligny-le-Neuf; and more lastingly Châtillon), held by the dukes of Coligny.
- the Marquisate of Coligny-le-Vieux, held by the Marquises of Coligny.
- the County of Coligny-le-Neuf, held by the Counts of Coligny.
- the Barony of Coligny-le-Neuf, held by the Barons of Coligny.
- the Lordship of Coligny, held by the Lords of Coligny.

The other lands held in Revermont held by the house of Coligny are:

- in Ain, the Lordships of Meillonnas, Treffort, Marboz, Pressiat, Ceyzériat, Pont-d'Ain
- in the Jura, the lordship then Marquisate of Andelot (1617)
- the Barony of Cressia,
- and the Barony of Chevreaux
- And in Bugey: the lordships of Cuchet (Saint-Sorlin-en-Bugey), Saint-Denis, Varey (Saint-Jean-le-Vieux).

=== Lands and titles in other regions ===
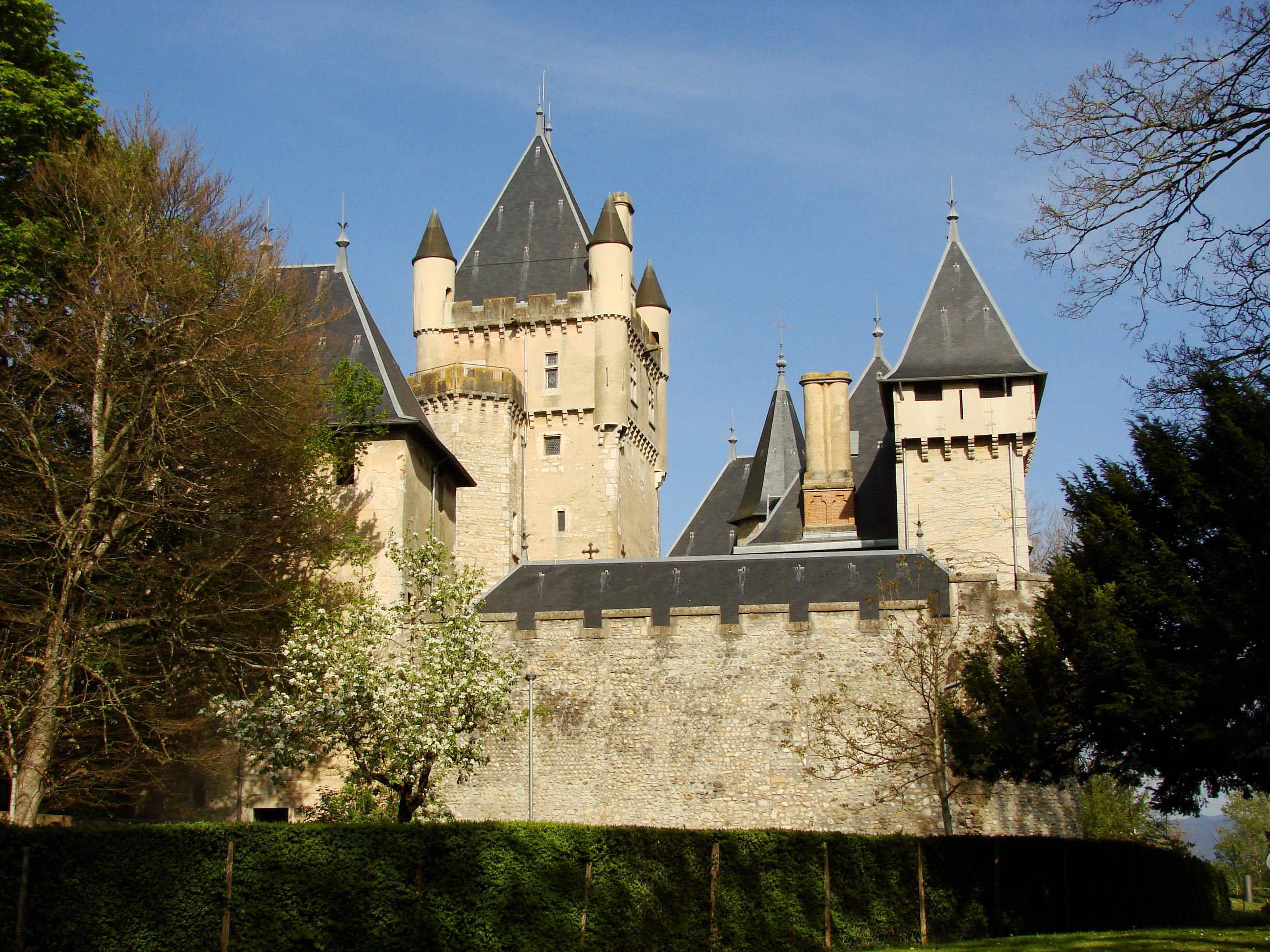
Château de Chazey-sur-Ain

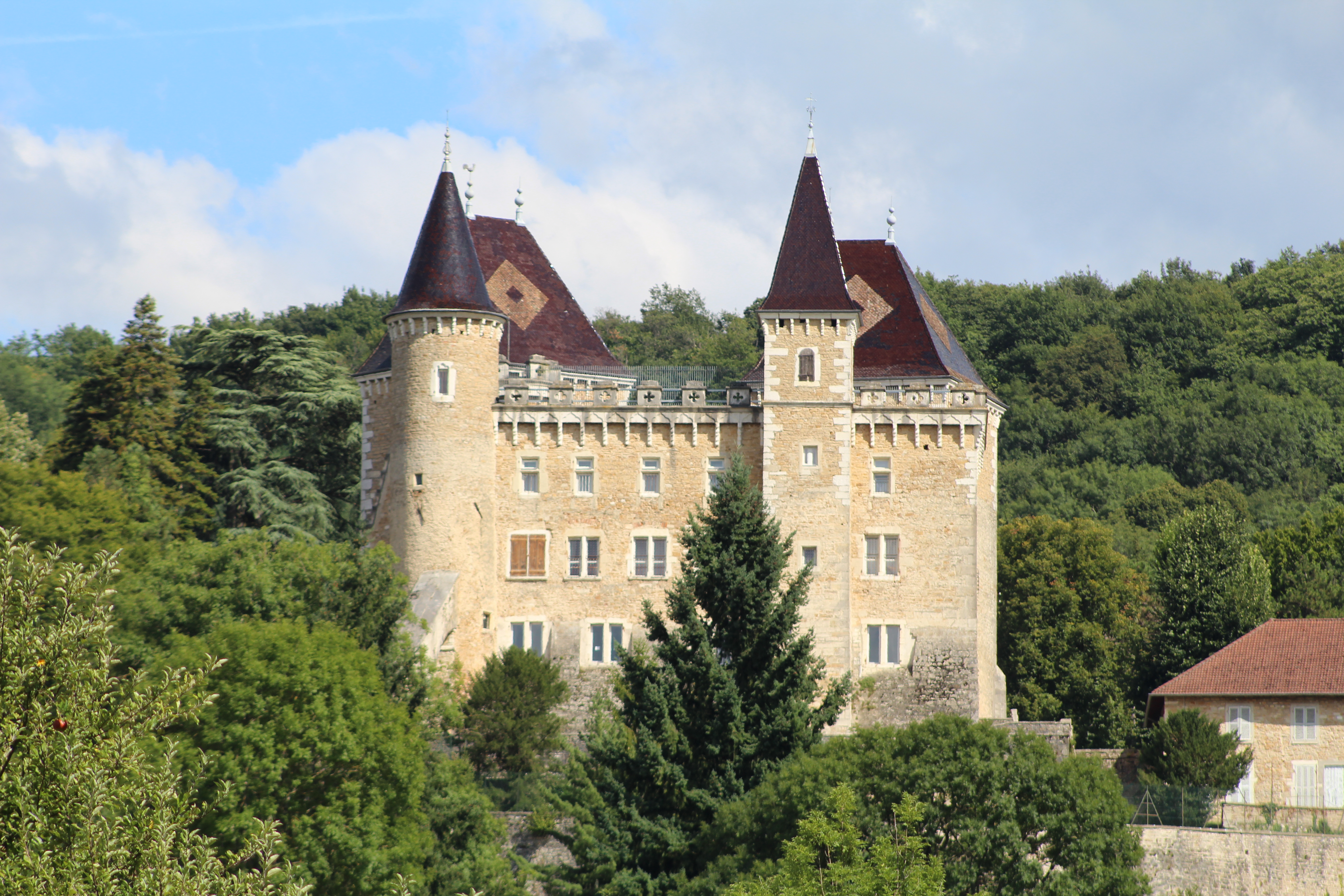
Château de Varey

By the marriage (1432) of Guillaume, Lord of Coligny, with Catherine de Saligny, the house of Coligny inherited the following lands:

- the Lordship of Châtillon-sur-Loing (Loiret) and adjacent lands.
- the Barony of La Motte-Saint-Jean (Saône-et-Loire).
- the Barony of Saligny (Allier).

The house of Coligny also owned the following lands:

- the County of Laval (by the marriage of François de Coligny d'Andelot with Claudine de Rieux, heiress of Laval as granddaughter of Guy XVI).
- the Lordships of Quintin, Tinténiac, Montmuran, Vitré, Rieux, Concoret, all in Brittany.
- the Barony of La Roche-Bernard (these lordships come from the Laval and allied families, such as the Montfort and the Rieux).
- the lordship of Tanlay (Yonne) (acquired around 1535 by Louise de Montmorency, mother of Admiral Gaspard II, of François d'Andelot, and of Cardinal Odet).

== Châteaux and mansions ==
Non-exhaustive list of possessions held in their own name or as a fief by the Coligny family:

- Donjon de Buenc in Hautecourt-Romanèche
- Château de Chazey-sur-Ain in Chazey-sur-Ain
- Château du Cuchet in Saint-Sorlin-en-Bugey
- Château de Jasseron in Jasseron (c. 1230-1307)
- Château de Pont-d'Ain in Pont-d'Ain (before 1289)
- Château de Saint-Denis-en-Bugey in Saint-Denis-en-Bugey (12th century)
- Château de Saint-Germain in Ambérieu-en-Bugey (from the beginning-1210)
- Château de Varey in Saint-Jean-le-Vieux (1150)

== Family tree ==
Coligny family tree

Guillaume de Montmorency	Anne Pot
Gaspard I	Louise de Montmorency	Anne de Montmorency, 1st Duke of Montmorency	Madeleine of Savoy
Charlotte de Laval	Gaspard II	Odet	François	François de Montmorency	Henri	Charles de Montmorency-Damville
Louise	François	Charles	Paul de Coligny
Frederick Henry, Prince of Orange	Gaspard III	Guy XX de Laval
William II of Orange	Gaspard IV de Coligny	Henriette	Anne	George II of Württemberg-Montbéliard
William III of England	Eleonore	Leopold
