= François de Coligny =

French Protestant general

- Count of Coligny; Lord of Châtillon
- Born: 28 April 1557; Châtillon-Coligny
- Died: 8 October 1591 (aged 34)
- Noble family: House of Coligny
- Spouse: Marguerite d'Ailly (m. 1581; died 1591)
- Issue: Henri de Coligny; Gaspard III de Coligny; Charles de Coligny; Françoise de Coligny
- Father: Gaspard II de Coligny
- Mother: Charlotte de Laval

François de Coligny, Count of Coligny and Lord of Châtillon (28 April 1557 – 8 October 1591) was a French Protestant general of the Wars of Religion.

== Early life ==
Coligny was born on 28 April 1557 at Châtillon-Coligny. He was the son of Admiral Gaspard II de Coligny (1519–1572) and, his first wife, Charlotte de Laval (1530–1568). From his parents' marriage, his siblings were Louise de Coligny (wife of Charles de Téligny and William I of Orange), and Charles de Coligny, Marquis d'Andelot, a Lieutenant General in Champagne. After his mother's death in 1547, his father married Jacqueline de Montbel d'Entremont, the Countess d'Entremont and Launay-Gelin, in 1571. From his father's second marriage, he had a younger half-sister, Béatrice de Coligny, who married Count Claude-Antoine d'Albon de Montauban de Meuillon d'Entremont.

Coligny came of a noble family of Burgundy. His family traced their descent from the 11th century, and in the reign of Louis XI, were in the service of the King of France. His paternal grandparents were Louise de Montmorency (sister of Anne de Montmorency) and Gaspard I de Coligny, known as the 'Marshal of Châtillon', who served in the Italian Wars from 1494 to 1516 and was created Marshal of France in 1516. Among his extended family were uncles Odet de Coligny, and François de Coligny d'Andelot, who both played an important part in the first period of the Wars of Religion.

== Career ==
He first saw action at the defence of Montpellier during the Sixth War of Religion from 1576 to 1577. First he razed the citadel, guarded by royal soldiers. Then, when the situation became difficult, he made a sortie across the Cévennes to Bergerac to recruit reinforcements and fought his way back into the town.

At the start of the war of the Catholic League, when king Henry III had practically no other support, he beat the Duke of Mayenne near Chartres in 1589.

He distinguished himself at the Battle of Arques in September 1589, where his arrival at the head of 500 arquebusiers allowed the victory of Henry IV to be expanded upon.

== Personal life ==
On 18 May 1581, he married Marguerite d'Ailly (d. 1604), daughter of Charles d'Ailly Lord of Seigneville, and Françoise de Warty. Together, they had four children:

- Henri de Coligny (d. 1601), Count of Coligny and Lord of Châtillon; who died in 1601 during the assault on Ostend.
- Gaspard III de Coligny (1584–1646), Count then Duke of Coligny, Marshal of France; he married Anne de Polignac in 1615.
- Charles de Coligny, Lord of Beaupont.
- Françoise de Coligny (d. 1637), who married René de Talensac, Lord of Londrières, in 1602.

Coligny died on 8 October 1591.

=== Family tree ===
Coligny family tree

Guillaume de Montmorency	Anne Pot
Gaspard I	Louise de Montmorency	Anne de Montmorency	Madeleine of Savoy
Charlotte de Laval	Gaspard II	Odet	François	François de Montmorency	Henri	Charles de Montmorency-Damville
Louise	François	Charles	Paul de Coligny
Frederick Henry, Prince of Orange	Gaspard III	Guy XX de Laval
William II of Orange	Gaspard IV de Coligny	Henriette	Anne	George II of Württemberg-Montbéliard
William III of England	Eleonore	Leopold
