= François de Coligny d'Andelot =

French Huguenot leader

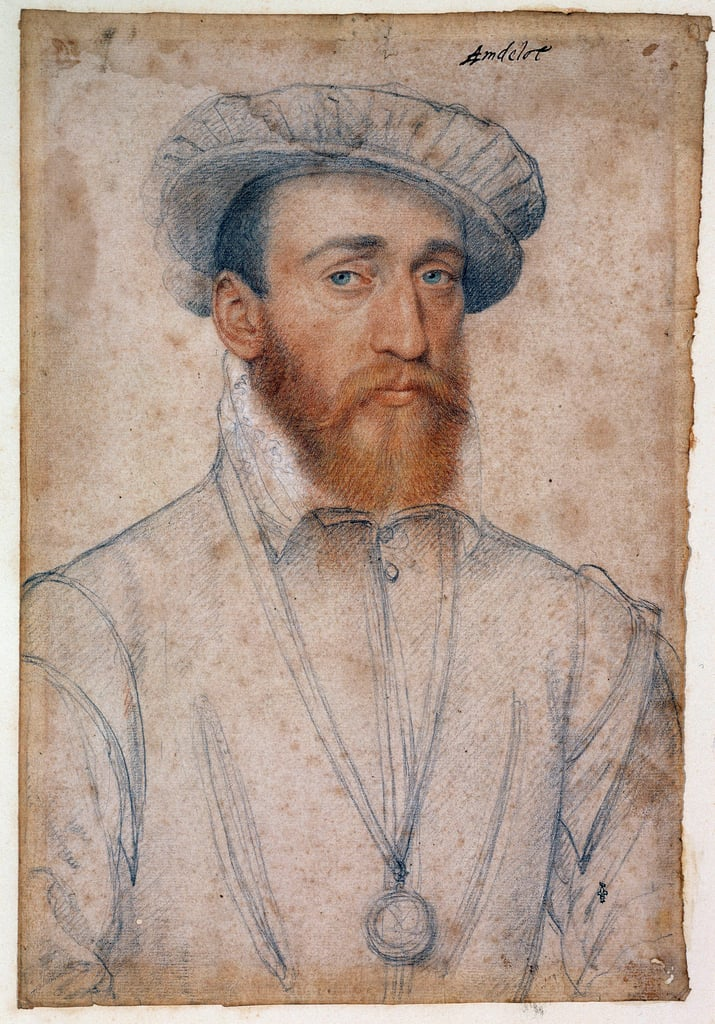
- Studio of Jean Clouet (c. 1555)
- Born: 18 April 1521; Châtillon-sur-Loing
- Died: 27 May 1569 (aged 48); Saintes, Charente-Maritime
- Relatives: House of Coligny
- Military career
- Allegiance: France
- Branch: Army
- Rank: Colonel-General of the infantry
- Conflicts: Italian Wars (Ceresole), Franco-Habsburg War (Saint-Quentin, Calais), Wars of Religion (Dreux, Jarnac)

François d'Andelot de Coligny (18 April 1521 – 27 May 1569) was one of the leaders of French Protestantism during the French Wars of Religion. The son of Gaspard I de Coligny, he was the younger brother of Odet, cardinal de Châtillon and Gaspard de Coligny, the admiral.

== Life ==
=== Italian Wars ===
He first gained military experience in the Italian Wars, and so distinguished himself at the battle of Ceresole (1544) that Louis de Bourbon, still comte d'Enghien at that time, knighted him on the battlefield. In 1547 he was made inspector-general of the infantry, and commanded the French troops sent to Scotland to defend the rights of Mary, Queen of Scots (until 1559, queen-consort of France). When war broke out again in Italy, he returned, marching to Parma and getting trapped in the city when it soon afterwards came under siege. Taken prisoner during a sortie, he was taken to the castle of Milan, where he remained until the treaty of Vaucelles in 1556.

=== Conversion ===
In prison, he read books obtained for him from outside and confirmed the doubts about Catholicism which he had already derived from conversations with French Protestants. On his return to France, he replaced his brother Gaspard as Colonel-General of the infantry and, at almost the same moment, war was declared against Spain. In charge of getting a relief column to Gaspard, who was defending Saint-Quentin, he found himself trapped there, but managed to prolong the siege and only surrendered when overwhelmed by the vast enemy numbers penetrating the city through the gaps they had blasted in the walls, when any resistance would have been useless. He succeeded in escaping the Spanish camp and rejoined the French army besieging Calais, where he acted so bravely that, according to Brantôme, Francis, Duke of Guise (who was no friend of François's) stated that all he needed to conquer a world of places were Andelot, Strozzi and [Antoine] d'Estrées.

When Andelot returned to Paris, the Guises, jealous of his favour with king Henry II, blackened his name by reporting certain discourses he had had on religion. The king called Andelot before him and, on receiving confirmation from him that he had made these discourses, flew into a rage, arrested him and had him taken to the castle of Melun, where he remained until his uncle, constable Anne de Montmorency, got him bail.

François d'Andelot was the first of the Châtillon family to take on the Protestant reforms, and one of their most zealous defenders. He founded a Calvinist church in Vitré which, from 1560, was provided with a resident pastor. It was Coligny d'Andelot who brought his brothers over to the Protestant side, and they always remained very united despite the lack in Andelot, otherwise a valiant and able captain, of Gaspard's prudence and moderation.

=== Wars of Religion ===
When the first War of Religion broke out, he was among the first to join Louis I de Bourbon, prince de Condé, named leader of the Protestant faction. François's position as colonel-général was confiscated and re-allocated to the duc de Randari. Despite suffering from a fever at the time, he fought at the battle of Dreux in 1562. The following year, he defended Orléans when it was besieged by the troops of Francis, Duke of Guise. The siege was only raised when the Duke was assassinated.

Peace was re-established, but he was ill and unable to participate in the siege of Le Havre in 1563, where Catholics and Protestants joined forces against English troops.

Andelot, the Prince de Condé, Gaspard de Coligny and Guyonne XVIII de Laval were considered the instigators of the 1567 "surprise de Meaux", a failed attempt by the Huguenots to kidnap king Charles IX and the queen mother, Catherine de Médici.

The Protestants took up arms again, and François d'Andelot was present at the siege of Chartres. He then retired into his lands in Brittany and, as he little trusted the queen's promises, raised fresh troops. These he led into Anjou, where he remained, ready to restart the war. When war resumed in 1568 he crossed the river Loire, penetrated into the Saintonge, captured several towns, and fought at the battle of Jarnac, where he gathered up part of what was left of the Protestant army after its retreat from Saintes. Seized by another violent fever, he died on 27 May 1569. His fellow Protestants attributed his death to poison, however there is no evidence of this.

== Marriages and descendants ==
- On 9 December 1548 (at Saint-Germain-en-Laye), he married Claudine de Rieux, dame de la Roche-Bernard, de Rieux, and de Rochefort, and they had:
  Marguerite de Coligny d'Andelot (born 28 February 1553),
  married Julien de Tournemine, seigneur de Montmoreal,
  Paul de Coligny, (13 August 1555 – 15 April 1586, Taillebourg), comte de Laval, de Montfort, d'Harcourt, and baron de Quintin,
  Children included Guy XX de Laval
  François II de Coligny d'Andelot (23 August 1559 † 9 April 1586), seigneur de Rieux,
- On 27 August 1564, he married Anne daughter of Jean, comte de Salm, and they had:
  François III de Coligny d'Andelot, seigneur de Tanlay,
  Benjamin de Coligny d'Andelot ( † 7 April 1586), seigneur de Sailly and seigneur de Courcelles-au-Bois,
  Anne de Coligny d'Andelot, dame de Tanlay, de Sailly et de Courcelles-au-Bois
  married in 1574 Jacques Chabot (died 1630), marquis de Mirebeau, son of Philippe Chabot,
  Susanne de Coligny d'Andelot,
  married Guillaume de Poitiers, baron d'Outre.

== Family tree ==
Coligny family tree

Guillaume de Montmorency	Anne Pot
Gaspard I	Louise de Montmorency	Anne de Montmorency, 1st Duke of Montmorency	Madeleine of Savoy
Charlotte de Laval	Gaspard II	Odet	François	François de Montmorency	Henri	Charles de Montmorency-Damville
Louise	François	Charles	Paul de Coligny
Frederick Henry, Prince of Orange	Gaspard III	Guy XX de Laval
William II of Orange	Gaspard IV de Coligny	Henriette	Anne	George II of Württemberg-Montbéliard
William III of England	Eleonore	Leopold

== Sources ==
- Abbé Pérau, "François de Coligny d'Andelot", in volume 16 of Vies des hommes illustres de France
- L'Amiral de Coligny, sire de Tinténiac en Bretagne. Paris, Lib.Fischbacher – Rennes, Lib. Filhon & Hommay – 1929, par V.Bellanger, Avocat à la Cour de Rennes
- "François de Coligny d'Andelot", in Marie-Nicolas Bouillet et Alexis Chassang (dir.), Dictionnaire universel d'histoire et de géographie, 1878 [détail des éditions] (Wikisource)
- "François de Coligny d'Andelot", in Louis-Gabriel Michaud, Biographie universelle ancienne et moderne : histoire par ordre alphabétique de la vie publique et privée de tous les hommes avec la collaboration de plus de 300 savants et littérateurs français ou étrangers, 2nd edition, 1843–1865
