= Odet de Coligny =

French aristocrat (1517–1571)

His Eminence Odet de Coligny
- Cardinal-Deacon
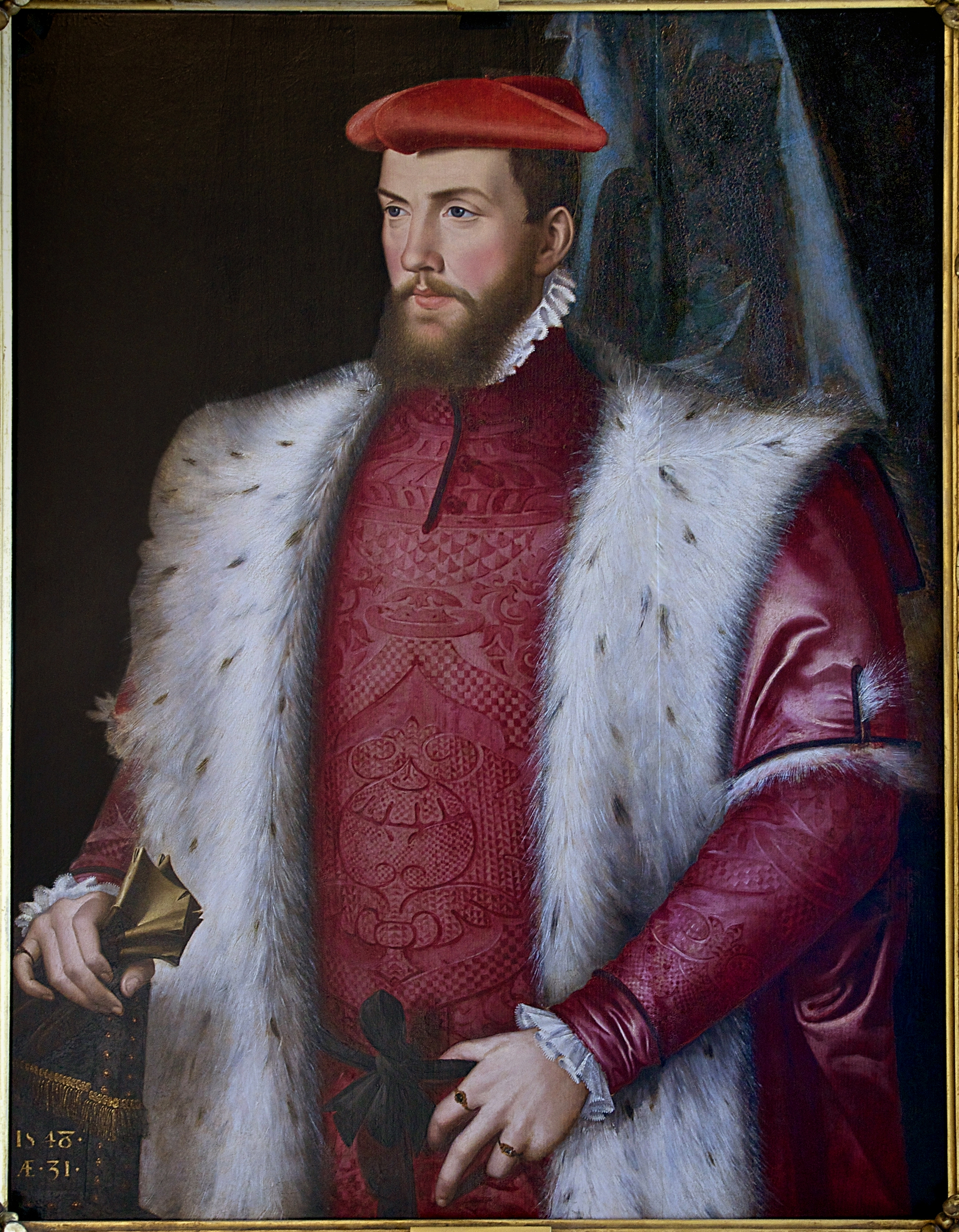
- Portrait attributed to François Clouet, c. 1548
- Church: Ss. Sergio e Bacco; Sant'Adriano al Foro
- Diocese: Archbishop of Toulouse (1534–1550); Administrator of Beauvais (1535–1563)

Orders
- Ordination: never ordained Priest
- Consecration: never consecrated Bishop
- Created cardinal: 7 November 1533; Cardinal de Châtillon by Pope Clement VII

Personal details
- Born: 10 July 1517 Châtillon-Coligny, France
- Died: March 21, 1571 (aged 53) Canterbury, England
- Buried: Canterbury Cathedral
- Parents: Gaspard I de Coligny; Louise de Montmorency
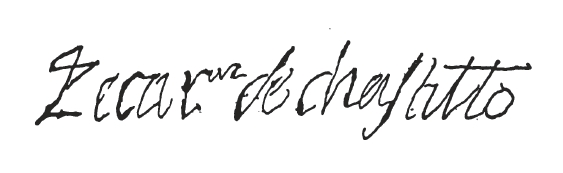
- Signature

Odet de Coligny (10 July 1517 – 21 March 1571) was a French aristocrat, cardinal, Bishop-elect of Beauvais, Peer of France, and member of the French Royal Council. From 1534 he was usually referred to as the Cardinal of Châtillon.

== Early life ==
Odet was son of Gaspard I de Coligny and Louise de Montmorency, and brother of Pierre (1515–1534), Gaspard (1519–1572), and François, Seigneur d'Andelot (1521–1569). (Note: François was the first of the brothers to become a Protestant, as early as 1556.) His birth at Châtillon-Coligny on 10 July 1517, his parents' second son, was recorded in his mother's book of hours. He and his brothers were home schooled, under the direction of Nicolas Bérauld of Orleans, a friend of Erasmus.

== Catholic career ==
Coligny occupied high church offices during this initial part of his career. He became prior of Saint-Étienne in Beaume in 1530. On 10 October 1531 he was nominated by the King to be Abbot of St. Euvertius in Orleans, for which he obtained the necessary papal bulls on 13 April 1533; he resigned the benefice in 1537.

=== Cardinal ===
At the papal consistory of 7 November 1533 (at 16 and while still a layman) Odet de Coligny was created cardinal deacon, receiving the red hat and the titular church of Santi Sergio e Bacco three days later. Soon afterwards he became Abbot of the royal abbey of Nôtre-Dame de Vauluisant (1534-1553). In 1534 he became a Canon of La Sainte-Chapelle in Paris.

On 29 April 1534 Cardinal de Coligny's nomination to the metropolitan see of Toulouse by King Francis I was approved in Consistory by Pope Clement VII, despite his never having been ordained a priest. The Cardinal required a dispensation for the archbishopric, since he was only sixteen, far below the minimum canonical age. The dispensation was granted by Pope Clement on 28 August 1534. On 6 September 1534, Odet de Coligny was ordained Subdeacon, and on 13 September he was ordained Deacon.

=== Archbishop of Toulouse, Bishop of Beauvais ===
Châtillon held the post of Administrator of the diocese of Toulouse, never having been consecrated a bishop, until his resignation from that role on 20 October 1550. At the age of seventeen, he participated in the papal conclave of 11–12 October 1534, in which Cardinal Alessandro Farnese was elected Pope Paul III. A year later, on 20 October 1535, his nomination to the See of Beauvais was approved in Consistory by Pope Paul III. He held the Administratorship of Beauvais until he was deprived of all his offices and benefices by Pope Pius IV in 1563. The spiritual functions of the Bishop of Beauvais were carried out from 1535-1538 by Philibert de Beaujeu, titular Bishop of Bethlehem; from 1538 to 1546 the bishop was Antoine le Tonnelier, titular Bishop of Damascus; the Bishop of Hippo from 1546 to 1555; the Bishop of Hebron served from 1555 to 1556; the Bishop of Sebaste from 1556-1563; and from 1563 to 1569, Bishop Philippe le Musnier.

The Cardinal was named Abbot of Saint-Lucien de Beauvais by the King in 1537. He was still holding the benefice in 1553, though it is not known whether he continued to hold it until his deposition on 31 March 1563.

Cardinal de Châtillon took part in the Ninth Session of the Ecumenical Council of Trent, which opened on 13 December 1545.

King Francis I died on 31 March 1547, and it was reported a week later by Sir Edward Wotton, the English Ambassador, that Cardinal Odet and his brother François were among the chief favorites of Henri II. As a Peer of France, Cardinal de Châtillon attended the funeral of Francis I in Saint Denis, and the Coronation of Henri II at Rheims on 26 July.

== Henri II ==
Cardinal de Châtillon participated in the papal conclave of 29 November 1549 – 7 February 1550. He arrived late, however, on 12 December, along with Cardinals de Guise, du Bellay, Vendome, and Tournon. A letter that he wrote to the Constable de Montmorency on 31 January 1550, during the Conclave, provides an intimate view of the politics of the conclave, and provides an account of the sudden death of one of the leading candidates, Cardinal Niccolò Ridolfi, a nephew of Pope Leo X. Ridolfi had been greatly favored by King Henri II of France. He opted for the deaconry of S. Adriano on 25 February 1549. Cardinal de Châtillon obtained from Pope Julius III the necessary bulls for his confirmation as Abbot of Fontainejean, in the diocese of Sens, shortly after the new Pope's election. The monastery was burned and the monks slaughtered in 1562. The Cardinal de Châtillon, who had apostasized in favor of Calvinism, was deprived of all of his benefices by Pope Pius IV on 31 March 1563.

The Cardinal did not stay long in Italy after the papal Coronation. He was back in France by 4 March, when he was at Orléans; on 11 March 1550, he wrote a letter from Châtillon; and on 29 May he was following the Court again and was in Boulogne, which King Henri had entered in triumph on 15 May after the city's capture from the English.

On 20 October 1550 Cardinal Odet de Châtillon was appointed Abbot Commendatory of Saint Jean de Sens. He also became the seventy-seventh Abbot, the fifth Abbot Commendatory, of the royal Abbey of Fleury, also known as the Abbey of St. Benoît-sur-Loire. He held this benefice until he was deposed in 1563, though the abbey was sacked by the Huguenot army of the Prince de Condé in 1562.

=== Protector of Ronsard and Rabelais ===
As a member of the King's Council, Châtillon was placed in charge of the library of France's Royal Privy Council and, using this and his other offices, he protected his friends Ronsard and Rabelais. In this he was working with Cardinal Jean du Bellay, who had been Rabelais' original protector. In 1552, after the Cardinal had obtained for the latter a ten-year monopoly on book-printing, Rabelais dedicated his Quart Livre of Pantagruel to Odet in gratitude. The Dedicatory Epistle is dated 28 January 1552.

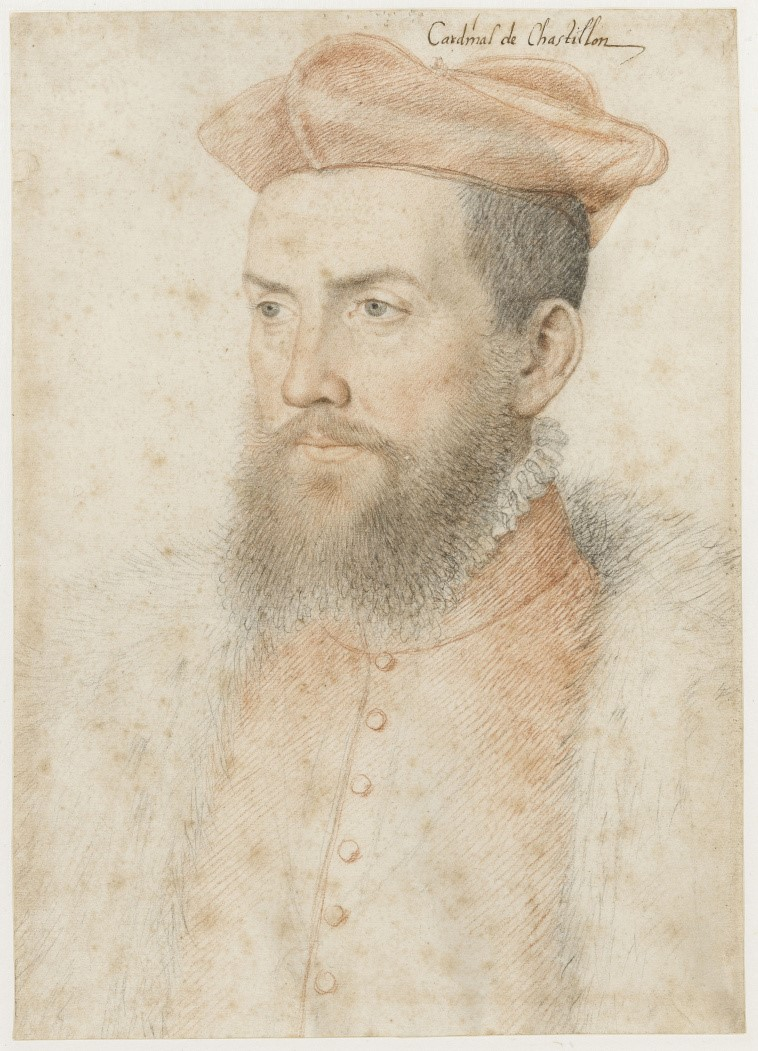
Portrait by François Clouet, c. 1553

In 1553 he succeeded Cardinal Claude de Longuy de Givry as Abbot Commendatory of Saint Bénigne de Dijon, and held the benefice until he was deposed in 1563. In 1554 the Cardinal de Châtillon ordered published the Synodial Constitutions of the Diocese of Beauvais, containing some twenty-one chapters on the duties and conduct of the clergy, including the requirement that they keep their beards shaved (la barbe rase) and their hair cut short. The Cardinal, according to his portraits, wore a full beard, which was becoming the fashion, and had very well trimmed hair. The statutes, in fact, were a reworking of those promulgated twenty-five years earlier.

In 1556 he became Abbot Commendatory of the Abbey of Ferrières on the appointment of King Henry II, with the confirmation of Pope Pius IV. Four years later, Pius named him grand inquisitor of France, though the French Parliament's opposition to the Inquisition prevented him from taking up the post.

Sometime after 1560 Cardinal Odet also became abbot of Grandchamps, of the Cistercian abbey of Nôtre Dame de Quincy in the diocese of Langres, and (from 1555, at least) of Vézelay. Finally, then, he was from 1554 to 1559 Prior (and from 14 August 1559 the Provost) of St-Pierre de Mâcon.

=== Colloquy of Poissy ===
Cardinal de Châtillon participated in the famous Colloquy of Poissy in the summer of 1561. When the reformer Theodore de Beze arrived in Poissy on 23 August he was met with great ceremony and obvious pleasure by the King of Navarre, the Prince de Condé and the Cardinal de Châtillon, almost with more honor (wrote Claude Haton) than the Pope of Rome would have received had he come.

== Protestant career ==
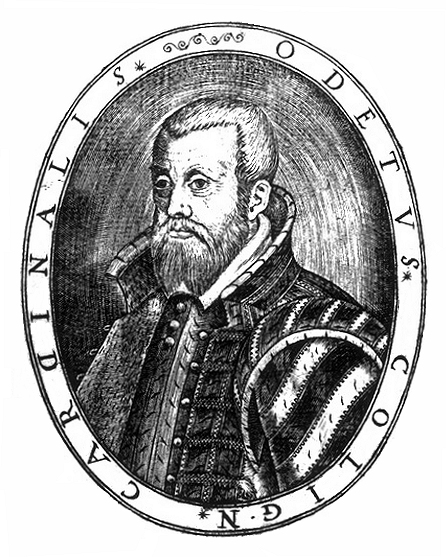
Odet de Coligny as a Protestant general

On 22 May 1558 Giovanni Michiel, the Venetian Ambassador to the French Court, which was at Monceau at the time, wrote that François d'Andelot, General of the Infantry and Cardinal de Châtillon's brother, had been arrested at Court on a charge of having participated in a meeting and procession of Protestants in the meadows beyond the Faubourg St. Germain, which was repeated day after day during the week. The Cardinal of Sens, Jean Bertrand, had been sent to investigate, and had ordered some one hundred persons in Paris arrested. When questioned François d'Andelot did not deny his affiliation with the Protestants, and he was sent under guard to Meaux, where he was confined. His wife was allowed to join him, but the King, who was very angry, also sent along several of his gentlemen to talk to him, as well as several professors from the Sorbonne, but he remained obstinate in his admitted affiliation. His brother, Cardinal de Châtillon, was also under suspicion of holding the same opinions, "and should they choose to go investigating matters farther," wrote the Ambassador, "I understand that many others of much higher grade will be discovered."

In fact, under his family's influence, the Cardinal eventually went over to the Protestant camp himself, becoming a Calvinist Huguenot in April 1561. He was not the only French prelate to convert to Calvinism in this period – one other example is Jean de Monluc, bishop of Valence. On Easter Monday (7 April 1561—actually 1562) the Cardinal celebrated the Eucharist in the Episcopal Palace at Beauvais. This was doubly offensive, first of all because he had never been ordained a priest and had no right to celebrate the Mass, and secondly because he celebrated the Eucharist in a rite similar to the Calvinist ritual used in Geneva. The result in Beauvais was rioting, which embarrassed and alarmed the Cardinal, who sent for the Governor of the Île-de-France, François de Montmorency, to put down the disorders, but the mayor of Beauvais had already taken care to inform Montmorency what was going on, and Montmorency countermanded the Cardinal's demand. He came to Beauvais alone, and discovered that the peace had already been restored. The people threw themselves on the mercy of the King, and the Queen-mother granted their supplication. Catherine de' Medici was eager to retain the services of the Cardinal de Châtillon as a bridge between Catholics and Protestants, hoping to use him to keep the peace between the two and thus preserve the monarchy for her children. On several occasions, even after his apostasy, she wrote him friendly letters requesting his help. At the same time, Philippe de Lenoncourt, the Bishop of Auxerre and brother of Cardinal de Lenoncourt, was writing to the Pope, urging him to strip Cardinal de Châtillon of his red hat.

On 21 May 1562, however, the Cardinal was cited to appear before the Roman Inquisition, and, having failed to appear, the sentence against him was published in Beauvais on 29 September 1562. When the Constable de Montmorency himself wrote to the Pope in favor of the Cardinal, a second summons was issued, on 17 November, which was published in Beauvais on 10 January 1563. The Royal Council then attempted to intervene, on the grounds that the summons was a violation of the royal prerogative. But the apostasy of a cardinal could not be overlooked by the Papacy. This intervention failed and brought about the Cardinal de Châtillon's excommunication and deposition on 31 March 1563. The sentence was not carried out in France, however, where it was claimed that the law required that a bishop be judged by his fellow bishops.

Gathering a faction around himself, he greatly helped those of the Huguenot party. He participated with his brother in the religious wars and acted as a mediator between the Protestants and Queen Catherine de' Medici.

In 1562, he escaped the Inquisition to Lyon, relinquished his title of cardinal and called himself the count of Beauvais (comte de Beauvais), after his old bishopric. In the secret consistory of 31 March 1563, Pope Pius IV and the French parliament excommunicated him as a heretic and deprived him of all his offices.

== Marriage ==
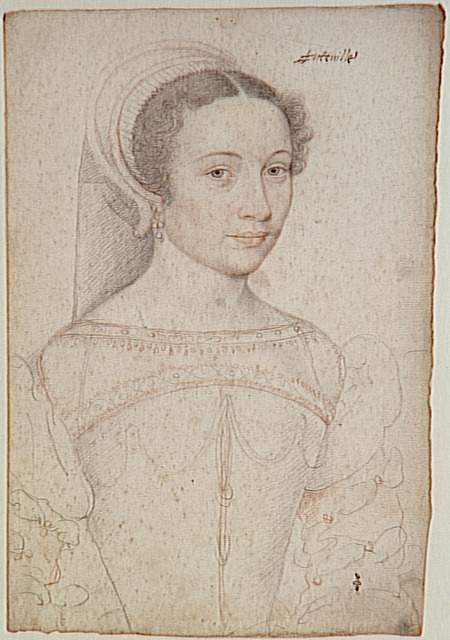
Clouet, Jean, Isabelle Hauteville, Odet's mistress and wife

In December 1564, probably on 1 December, the Cardinal married his mistress Ysabel de Hauteville (Isabeau or Isabelle de Hauteville, also known as Elizabeth de Kanteville or Mme. la Cardinale) at Montataire, in a ceremony conducted by a Huguenot minister, Pierre Melet. The Cardinal appeared with his wife, wearing his cardinal's robes, at the Coming of Age ceremony of King Charles IX.

He fought at the Battle of Saint-Denis and in 1568 fled to England. On 5 September 1568 the Cardinal wrote a letter to King Charles IX from the village of Sénarpont, informing him that he had discovered a plan of his enemies to seize him in his house, and therefore he was fleeing from his house and from the kingdom. On 8 September he wrote to Queen Elizabeth, seeking asylum in England. On 14 September the Cardinal wrote to King Charles again, and also to Catherine de' Medici, this time from London, begging the King to continue to hold him in his favor, and stating that he was not in England for any purpose, and that he had only decided to go to England some three hours before he left his house. In London, he requested monetary support for the French Protestants from Queen Elizabeth, who favoured him and his wife. He took up residence at Shene, from which he frequently wrote letters to Sir William Cecil, the Secretary of State, on behalf of Protestants, whether soldiers, merchants or refugees from the Civil War which was going on in France. In November 1568, Châtillon obtained permission to return to France, intending to sail to Rochelle, which was in Protestant hands and where he was expected, but bad winds at Portsmouth prevented his crossing. On 10 January 1569, Cardinal de Châtillon was commissioned by the Queen of Navarre, the Princes of Navarre, the Prince of Condé, and the other Protestant leaders, to seek aid from the Queen of England in the Third War of Religion. In February 1569, the Cardinal was in Canterbury.

In 1568, his former abbacy of Ferrières was besieged by the troops of Louis de Condé, friend of the Coligny family and fellow Protestant. The abbey was pillaged and profaned and, although no monks were killed, the reliquaires and treasures of the abbey were dispersed, the tombs of Louis III, Carloman and Louis de Blanchefort heavily damaged and the monks' stalls removed. Cardinal Odet, though abroad by then, intervened to stop this. On 19 and 23 May 1569, the Parliament of Paris deprived the Cardinal de Châtillon of all of his honours, offices, and estates, his dignity as Peer of the Realm, and the income of all of his benefices. The Cardinal's brother François also died, on 27 May 1569.

== Death ==
On 9 October 1570, having taken leave of Queen Elizabeth and his other friends at Court, Châtillon set off for Southampton, intending to cross to France. He was preparing to go from England to La Rochelle to join his brother. Bad weather, however, prevented him from embarking, and in the meantime, on 29 October, he was granted the Freedom of Southampton by the burgesses. On November 10 he was still prevented from crossing, a fire having broken out in the ship he was to use, and he decided therefore to change his plans and to go to Picardy instead of La Rochelle, though at that point he was impeded by the very bad health of his wife. He returned to London, where he joined the French Ambassador de la Mothe Fénelon in discussions on the subject of the proposed marriage of the 19 year old Francis, Duke of Anjou and Alençon, to the thirty-seven year old Elizabeth. On 6 December the Cardinal left London for Canterbury, though in mid-January 1571 he was back at the English Court and discussions on the Anjou marriage continued.

On 25 January he left London again, and not in good health. He grew worse, and at the end of February he was suffering from 'fits'. On 2 March, Henry Killibrew wrote to his employer, William Cecil, the queen's secretary, that he had just tried to see the Cardinal, who at first could not receive him, but later in the day he was sent for and found the Cardinal 'weak and faint'. On 13 March Lord Cobham in London wrote to Dover Castle that the Cardinal was attempting to arrange a stay in an execution there, until he could plead at Court, which, the Cardinal said, would be very soon. But on the evening of 21 March 1571, the Cardinal lost the ability to speak, and shortly thereafter died. He died at the former pilgrims' lodge at Canterbury under mysterious circumstances (possibly poisoned by his servant, perhaps on the orders of the French government).

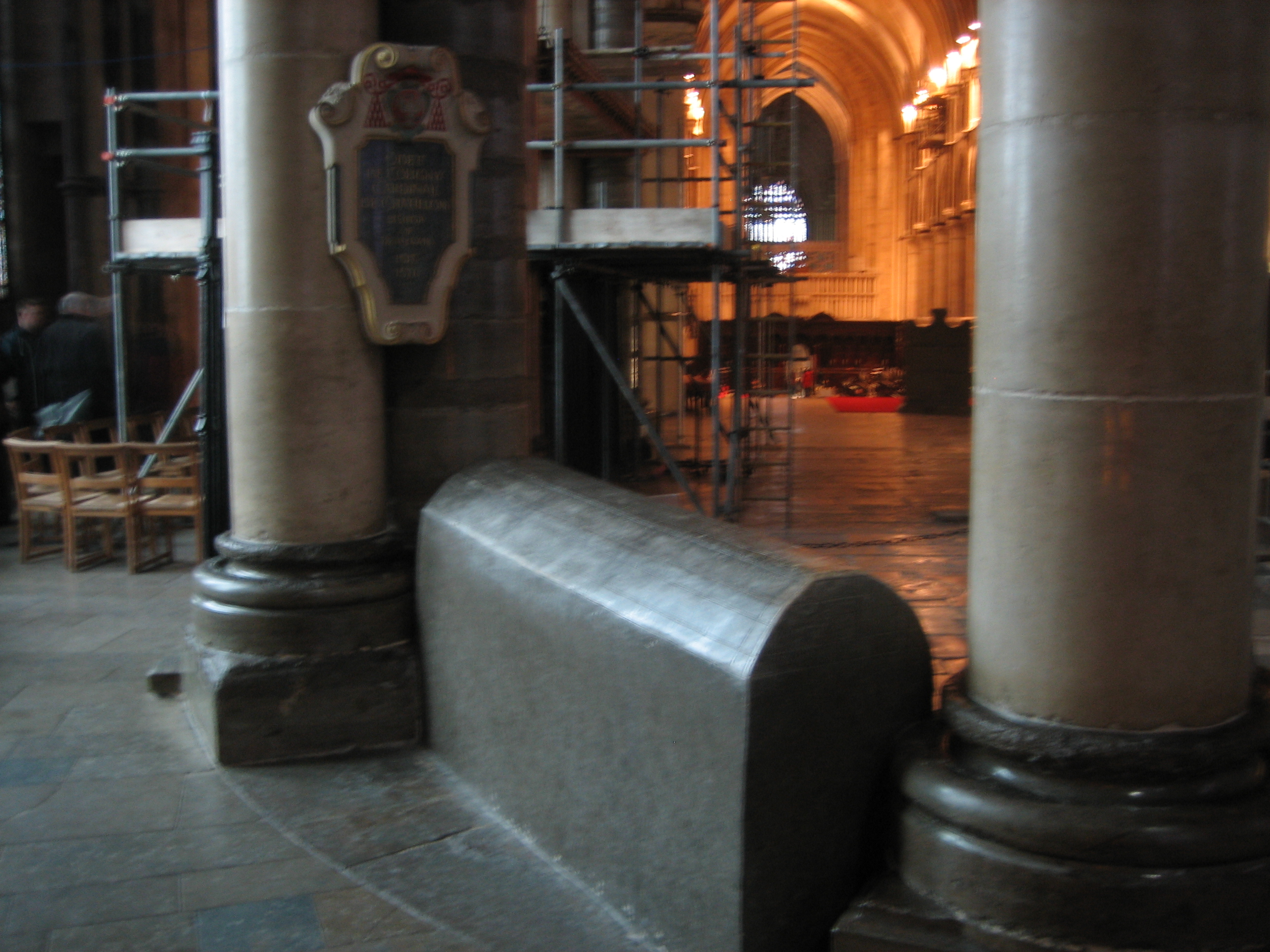
Odet de Coligny's tomb at Canterbury Cathedral

Queen Elizabeth ordered a Commission of Inquiry into the cause of his death. The Cardinal's wife gave testimony that she believed that he had been given slow poison, and that the proof was in his perforated stomach, discovered at the autopsy. This, however, was most definitely not the opinion of the Cardinal's physicians. The doctors pointed out that when the body was opened, the lungs and liver were also damaged; the stomach, however, was 'raw'. But the Commission could find no evidence of a poisoner, and would not have considered poisoning, had it not been for the insistence of Lady Châtillon.

The Cardinal was therefore buried in a temporary and very plain tomb covered in hessian and plaster in the Trinity Chapel in the east end of Canterbury Cathedral. It was meant to have been a temporary solution pending his body's return to France, but the transfer never occurred, and he still rests there.

== Family tree ==
Coligny family tree

Guillaume de Montmorency	Anne Pot
Gaspard I	Louise de Montmorency	Anne de Montmorency, 1st Duke of Montmorency	Madeleine of Savoy
Charlotte de Laval	Gaspard II	Odet	François	François de Montmorency	Henri	Charles de Montmorency-Damville
Louise	François	Charles	Paul de Coligny
Frederick Henry, Prince of Orange	Gaspard III	Guy XX de Laval
William II of Orange	Gaspard IV de Coligny	Henriette	Anne	George II of Württemberg-Montbéliard
William III of England	Eleonore	Leopold

== Bibliography ==
- Atkinson, Ernest G (1890), The Cardinal of Châtillon in England, 1568–1571 : a paper read on 13 November 1889, before the Huguenot society of London Proceedings of the Huguenot Society of London (in English and French). Vol. 3. London: Huguenot Society of London. 1892. pp. 172–285.
- Becquerel, Antoine César (1876), Souvenirs historiques sur l'amiral Coligny : sa famille et sa seigneurie de Châtillon-Sur-Loing [Historical memories of the Admiral Coligny: his family and his estate at Châtillon-sur-Loing] (in French) (2d ed.), Paris: Firmin-Didot.
- Berton, Charles (1857), Dictionnaire des cardinaux, contenant des notions générales sur le cardinalat, la nomenclature complète..., des cardinaux de tous les temps et de tous les pays... les détails biographiques essentiels sur tous les cardinaux... de longues études sur les cardinaux célèbres... [Dictionary of Cardinals, containing general notions on the cardinalship, the complete nomenclature… of the Cardinals from all times and countries… the essential biographic details on all Cardinals… long studies on the famous Cardinals…] (in French), Paris: J.-P. Migne; facsimile edition. Farnborough.
- Cardella, Lorenzo (1969) [1793], Gregg (ed.), Memorie storiche de' cardinali della Santa Romana Chiesa [Historical notes of the Cardinals of the Holy Roman Church], vol. IV, Rome: Stamperia Pagliarini, pp. 134–35 cols 692–93.
- Christol, Marguerite (1961). "Odet de Coligny: Cardinal de Châtillon". Bulletin de la Société de l'Histoire du Protestantisme Français. 107: 1–12. JSTOR 24292166.
- Chacón, Alfonso (1630), Vitæ, et res gestæ Pontificvm Romanorum et S. R. E. Cardinalivm ab initio nascentis Ecclesiæ vsque ad Vrbanvm VIII. Pont. Max [Lives, and the exploits of the Roman Popes and of the Cardinals of the Holy Roman Church, from the very beginning of the Church until Pope Urban VIII] (in Latin), vol. II, Roma: Typis Vaticanis, cols. 1480–81, 2 volumes.
- Coligny, Odet de, cardinal de Chatillon, 1515–71 (1885), Marlet, M. Léon (ed.), Correspondance d'Odet de Coligny, cardinal de Chatillon (1537–1568) [Correspondence of Odet de Coligny, Cardinal of Châtillon (1537–68)] (in French), Paris: A Picard (Documents publ. par la Societé historique & archéologique du Gatinais; I).
- Crosby, Allan James, ed. (1871). Calendar of State Papers, Foreign Series, of the Reign of Elizabeth. Vol. VIII (1566-1568). London: Longman, Green, Longman, Roberts, & Green.
- Crosby, Allen James, ed. (1874). Calendar of State Papers, Foreign Series, of the Reign of Elizabeth: Preserved in the Public Record Office (1569-71). London: H.M. Stationery Office.
- Delaborde, Jules (1879). Gaspard de Coligny: amiral de France (in French). Vol. Tome premier. Paris: Sandoz et Fischbacher, G. Fischbacher, successeur.
- Delettre, André (1843). Histoire du diocèse de Beauvais (in French). Beauvais: Desjardin. pp. 196–255.
- Eubel, Conradus; Gulik, Guglielmus van (1935), Hierarchia Catholica Medii et Recientoris Aevi [The Catholic hierarchy, of mediæval & recent times] (in Latin), Münster: Sumptibus et Typis Librariae Regensbergianae.
- Holt, Mack P. (1999). The French Wars of Religion, 1562-1629. Cambridge University Press.
- Marlet, Léon (1883), Le Cardinal de Châtillon : 1517–1571, Paris: H Menu. Annales de la Société Historique et Archéologique du Gâtinais (in French). Vol. 1. Fontainebleau. 1883. pp. 153–168, 193–213.
- Michon, Cédric, "Cardinals at the Court of Francis I," Martin Heale, ed. (2014). The Prelate in England and Europe, 1300-1560. Woodbridge, Suffolk UK: Boydell & Brewer Ltd. pp. 76–98. ISBN 978-1-903153-58-1.
- Sainte-Marthe, Denis de, ed. (1751). Gallia christiana in provincias ecclesiasticas distributa... opera et studio Domini Dionysii Sammarthani (in Latin). Vol. Tomus nonus (Volume 9). Paris: Typographia regia. [Christian France, distributed into ecclesiastical provinces, by the work of Dom Denis de Sainte-Marthe]
- Sainte-Marthe, Denis de, ed. (1728). Gallia Christiana in provincias ecclesiasticas distributa: qua series et historia archiepiscoporum, episcoporum, et abbatum franciae vicinarumque ditionum... (in Latin). Vol. Tomus quartus (Volume 4). Paris: ex typographia regia.
- Shimizu, J. (1970). Conflict of Loyalties, Politics and Religion in the Career of Gaspard de Coligny: Admiral of France, 1519-1572. Librairie Droz. pp. 23–24. ISBN 978-2-600-03033-5.
