= Marquis of Coligny =

Arms of the Coligny family

The Marquis of Coligny was a title in the French nobility created for Charles de Coligny in 1617.

== History ==
The Marquis of Coligny-le-Vieux was created in 1617 by Archduke Albert of Austria and his wife Isabella Clara Eugenia, on the land of Coligny, for the benefit of Charles de Coligny (1654–1632), younger son of Gaspard II de Coligny de Châtillon, Admiral of France, Lord of the two Coligny (-le-Vieux, from his ancestors; and le-Neuf, County in March 1556, which he acquired in July 1563 and which was inherited by his eldest son François). Upon the extinguishment of the House of Coligny in 1694, the lands of Coligny-le-Vieil passed through inheritance to the families of Langeac, Sandersleben (through Léopold-Eberhard, whose wife Anne-Sabine acquired the lands of the marquisate in 1719), Faucigny-Lucinge and Pillot who titled themselves "Marquis of Coligny" in their own right.

== List of the Marquesses of Coligny ==
=== House of Coligny ===
- 1617–1629: Charles de Coligny (1564–1632), 1st Marquis of Coligny (1617), 1st Marquis of Andelot (1617), and Marquis of Saint-Bris, younger son of Admiral Gaspard II de Coligny.
- 1629–1644: Clériadus de Coligny (1578–1644), 2nd Marquis of Coligny, 2nd Marquis of Andelot, cousin of the preceding from whom he bought the marquisate.
- 1644–1664: Joachim de Coligny (d. 1664), 3rd Marquis of Coligny, 3rd Marquis of Andelot, Baron de Cressia, son of the preceding.
- 1664–c. 1670: Barbe de Coligny, 4th Marquise of Coligny, 4th Marquise of Andelot, sister of the preceding, wife of Gilbert V de Langheac.

=== House of Langheac ===
Arms of the Langeac family

- c. 1670–1676: Gilbert VI of Langheac (d. 1676), 5th Marquis of Coligny, 1st Count of Dalet, son of the preceding, husband of Louise-Françoise de Bussy-Rabutin (daughter of Roger, Count of Bussy).
- 1676–1719: Marie François Roger de Langheac (1676–1746), 6th Marquis of Coligny, 2nd Count of Dalet, Count of Toulongeon in Autunois, son of the preceding.

=== House of Württemberg ===
- 1719–1735: Anne Sabine Hedwiger (1676–1735), Marquise of Coligny and Countess of Sponeck. In 1719, she received the Marquisate of Coligny-le-Vieux from Roger de Langheac (1676–1746). Her morganatic husband, Leopold Eberhard, Duke of Württemberg, Prince of Montbéliard, was the son of Anne de Coligny, heiress of the County of Coligny-le-Neuf in 1657, and George II, Duke of Württemberg-Montbéliard.
- 1735–1786: Léopoldine-Eberhardine de Sponeck (1697–1786), Marquise de Coligny, Countess of Coligny-le-Neuf, wife of Charles-Léopold de Sandersleben (1698–1763), who was likely a son of Léopold-Eberhard (making Sandersleben her half-brother); daughter of the preceding.
- 1786–1793: Anne-Élisabeth de Sandersleben (1722–1793), Marquise de Coligny, Countess of Coligny-le-Neuf, wife of Thomas de Pillot (1713–1777), Lord of Chenecey, head of the Pillot family, daughter of the preceding.

Anne-Élisabeth's elder sister, Eléonore-Charlotte de Sandersleben (1720–1781), who died before she could inherit, married Louis-Christophe de Faucigny-Lucinge in 1752, whose descendants took the names Faucigny-Lucinge de Coligny et Châtillon. The Faucigny-Lucinge and Pillot family henceforth shared the title of Count and Marquis of Coligny (-le-Neuf, and le-Vieux), co-Lords of the lands of Coligny until the Revolution.

== See also ==
- List of French marquesses
- French nobility
