= Seigneur de Châtillon =

Seigneur de Châtillon can refer to:

- Gaspard I de Coligny (1465/1470 – 1522)
- Gaspard II de Coligny (1519 – 1572)
- Gaspard III de Coligny (1584 – 1646)
