= Château de Varey =

12th-century French castle

Coordinates: 46.0267°N 5.4046°E

- Saint-Jean-le-Vieux, Ain in France
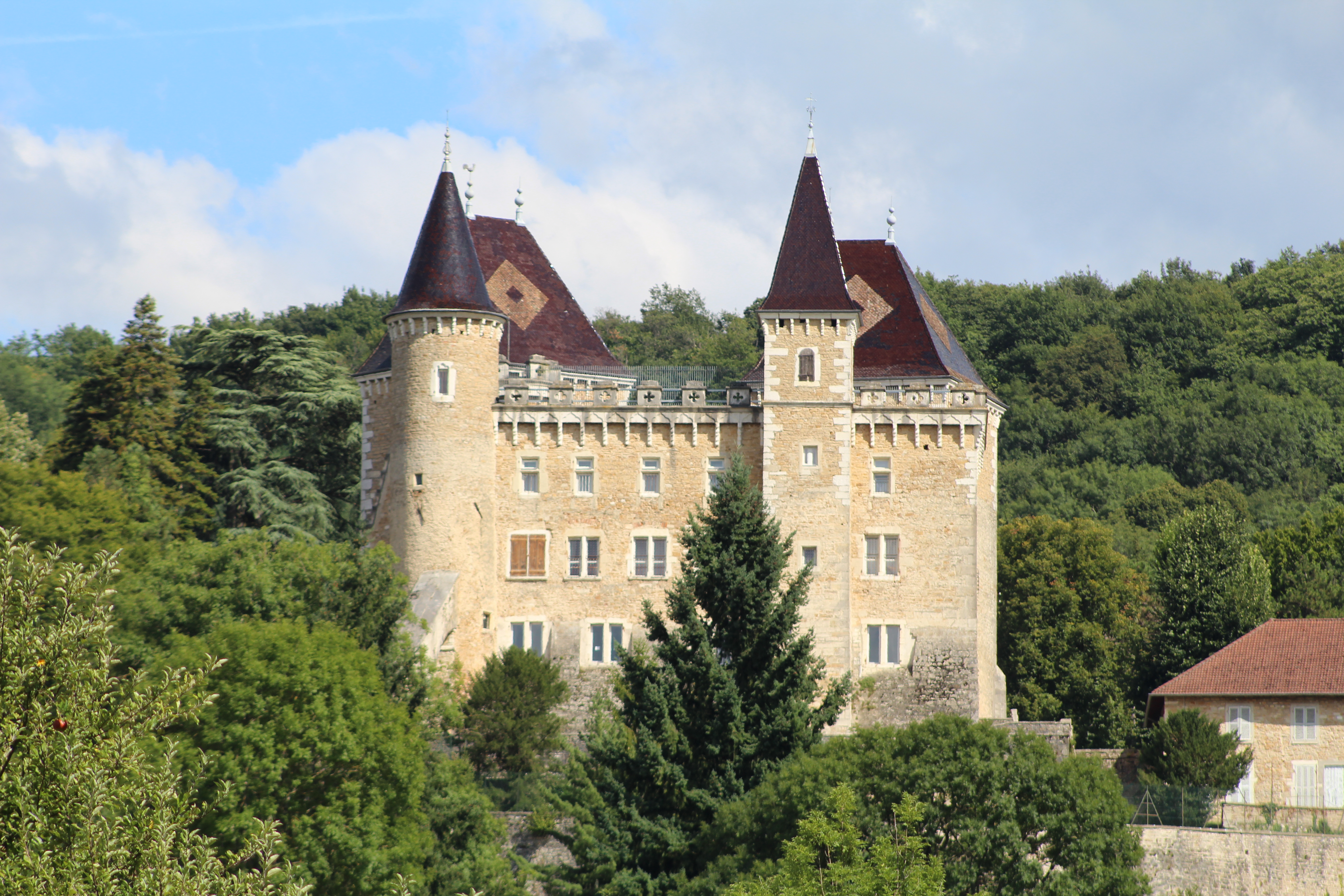

Site information
- Type: Castle
- Open to the public: Yes
- Condition: Restored

Site history
- Built: 12th century
- Battles/wars: Battle of Varey

Garrison information
- Designations: Monument historique (1983) PA00116554

The Château de Varey is an ancient fortified castle, from the 12th century, restored in the 19th century. It is located in the commune of Saint-Jean-le-Vieux, one kilometer east of the town, in the Ain department in the Auvergne-Rhône-Alpes region.

The façades and roof of the château are listed as a Monument historique by decree of 21 March 1983.

== History ==
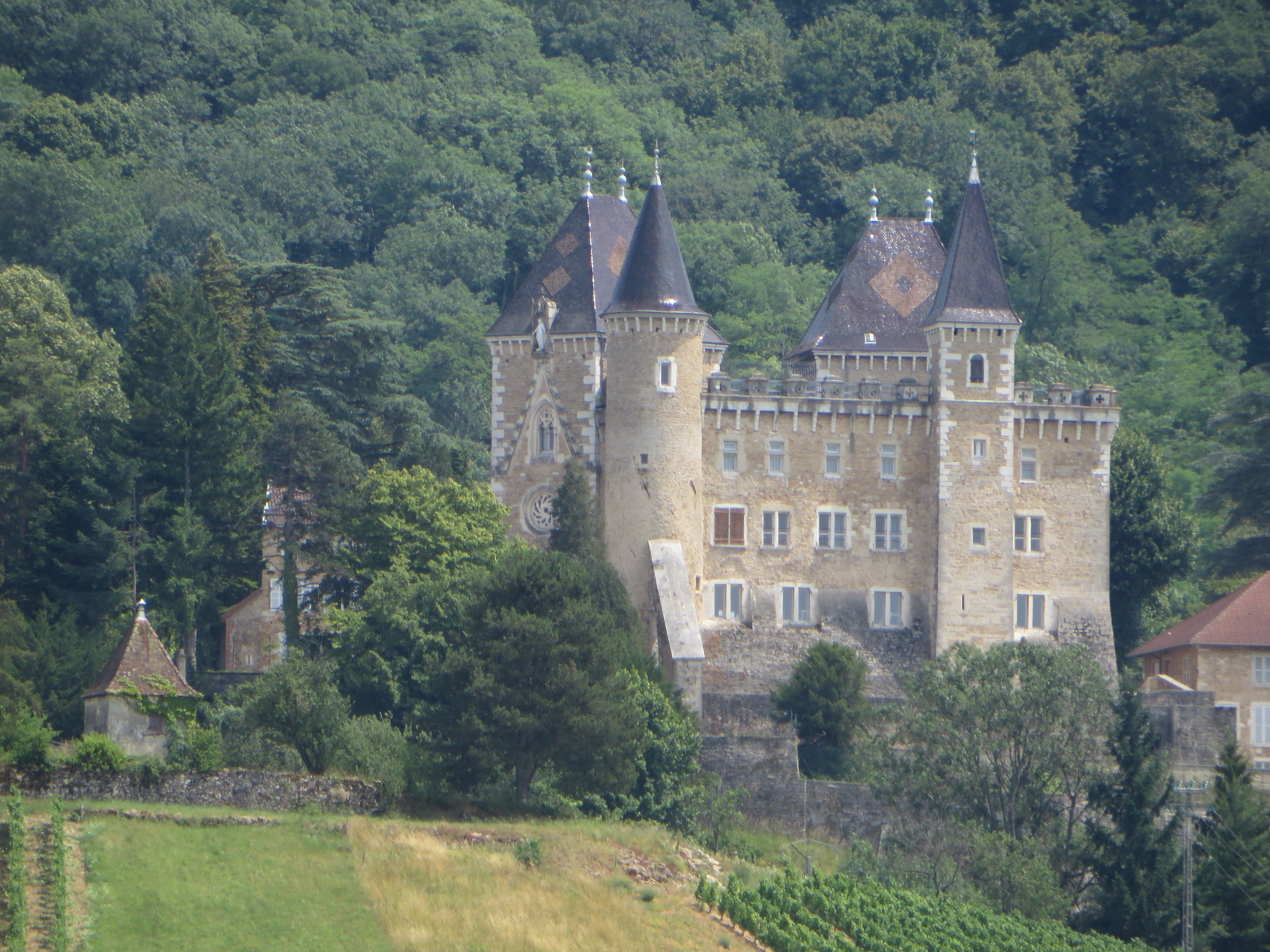
The Château, 2014

This very ancient lordship was the possession in 1150 of Guerric, Lords of Coligny and Revermont, under the suzerainty of the Lords of Thoire. In 1188, Humbert de Thoire made a confession of it to King Henry VI of the Holy Roman Empire.

=== Counts of Geneva ===
According to Samuel Guichenon, around 1240, Varey passed from the Lords of Coligny to the Counts of Geneva, through the marriage of Marie de Coligny, daughter of Hugues de Coligny, Lord of Coligny-le-Neuf, with Rudolf, Count of Geneva.

In his will, Count Amadeus II of Geneva (second son of Marie and Rudolf) designated his son William as his successor and specified that his other sons, Amadeus, and Hugues of Geneva, would inherit the châteaux of Varey, Mornex, Rumilly-sous-Cornillon, and Cornillon, for the Vidomnate of Bornes, for the rights to the market of La Roche, and for the lands and rents that he possessed in Vaud, all on the condition that they could only alienate these castles and rights in favor of the heirs of the count".

In 1309, Amadeus II gave the Lordship in marriage to his daughter Jeanne of Geneva, first wife of Guichard, Lord of Beaujeu and Dombes, then it was withdrawn to be given to Hugues of Geneva, Lord of Anthon, his uncle, another son of Marie de Coligny.

=== Dauphins of Viennois ===
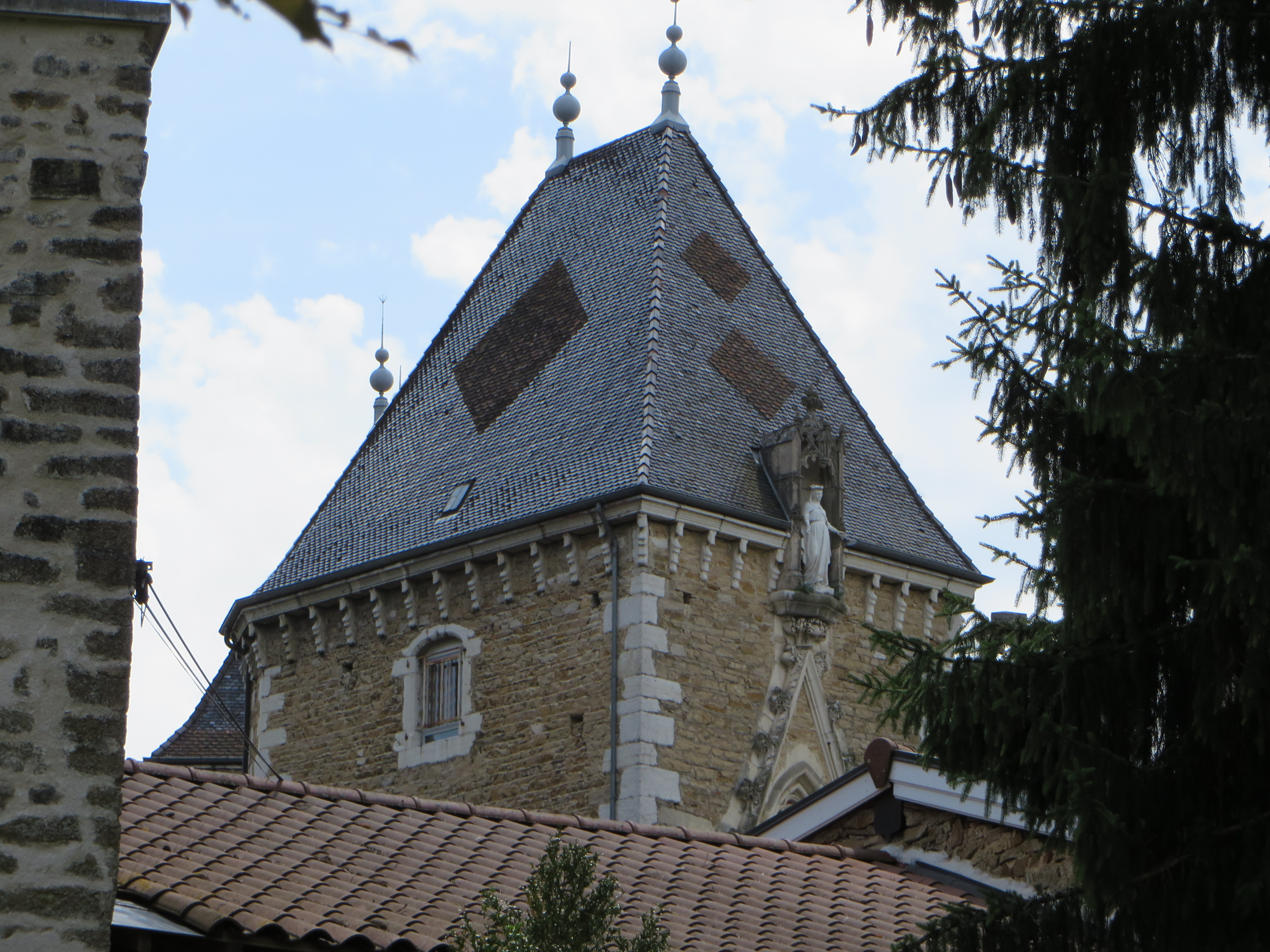
The Château's roof, 2014

The château was then considered one of the largest and strongest in Bugey. Edward, Count of Savoy, tried in vain to seize it by force on 7 August 1325, during the Battle of Varey, and saw his army defeated and almost annihilated by Guigues VIII, Dauphin of Viennois, who rushed to the aid of the place. Grateful for the service that the dauphin had rendered him, Hugues of Geneva recognized himself as the latter's liege man, and paid homage on 16 February 1334 from Varey, to his successor Humbert II of Viennois. The castle, considered important by the Dauphin, was purchased from Hugues de Geneva.

In 1349, it was acquired, along with the whole of Dauphiné, by Philip VI, the King of France, who died in 1350 and was succeeded by his eldest son, John II. By the exchange contract, dated 5 January 1355, King John II and his son Charles, the new Dauphin of Viennois, ceded it with his mandate to Amadeus V, Count of Savoy.

=== Chalant family ===
By way of letters dated 3 May 1410, Thonon, Amadeus VII, Count of Savoy enfeoffs it, in all justice seigneuriale, to Boniface de Chalant, Lord of Montbretton, Marshal of Savoy, who bequeaths it by will to his youngest son, Amé de Chalant, beginning the Lords of Varey branch of the Chalant family.

After the death of Étienne-Philibert de Chalant, Lord of Varey and Saix, who died without issue, part of the Lordship was judicially awarded on 28 March 1556, by order of the Parliament of Chambéry, to his creditors who were German merchants, whom Duke Emmanuel-Philibert of Savoy paid off in 1560, to give this land first to Claude de Divonne, his squire, then on 27 October 1563 to Prosper of Geneva, Lord of Lullin, and finally to enfeoff it again, on 15 October 1571, to Claude de l'Aubépin, nephew of Étienne-Philibert de Chalant.

Renée de l'Aubépin, daughter of Claude, married François d'Ugnie, Lord of La Chaux. From this family, it passed, by marriage, to the Beaurepaire family, who took over the fief in 1644, 1656, 1665, 1675 and 1723.

=== Dervieu family ===
On 30 March 1753, de Beaurepaire sold it for 206,000 livres, to Jean Dervieu, Lord of Villars, who passed it on to his descendants. The Château de Varey, badly damaged in 1793, by the orders of Albitte, was restored in the middle of the 19th century by architect Fléchel. In 1873 it was still in the possession of the Dervieu family.
