= Marshal of Châtillon =

Marshal of Châtillon may refer to more than one Marshal of France:

- Gaspard I de Coligny of the fifteenth and sixteenth centuries
- Gaspard III de Coligny of the seventeenth century
