= Gaspard III de Coligny =

French Huguenot

Gaspard III de Coligny Duke of Châtillon
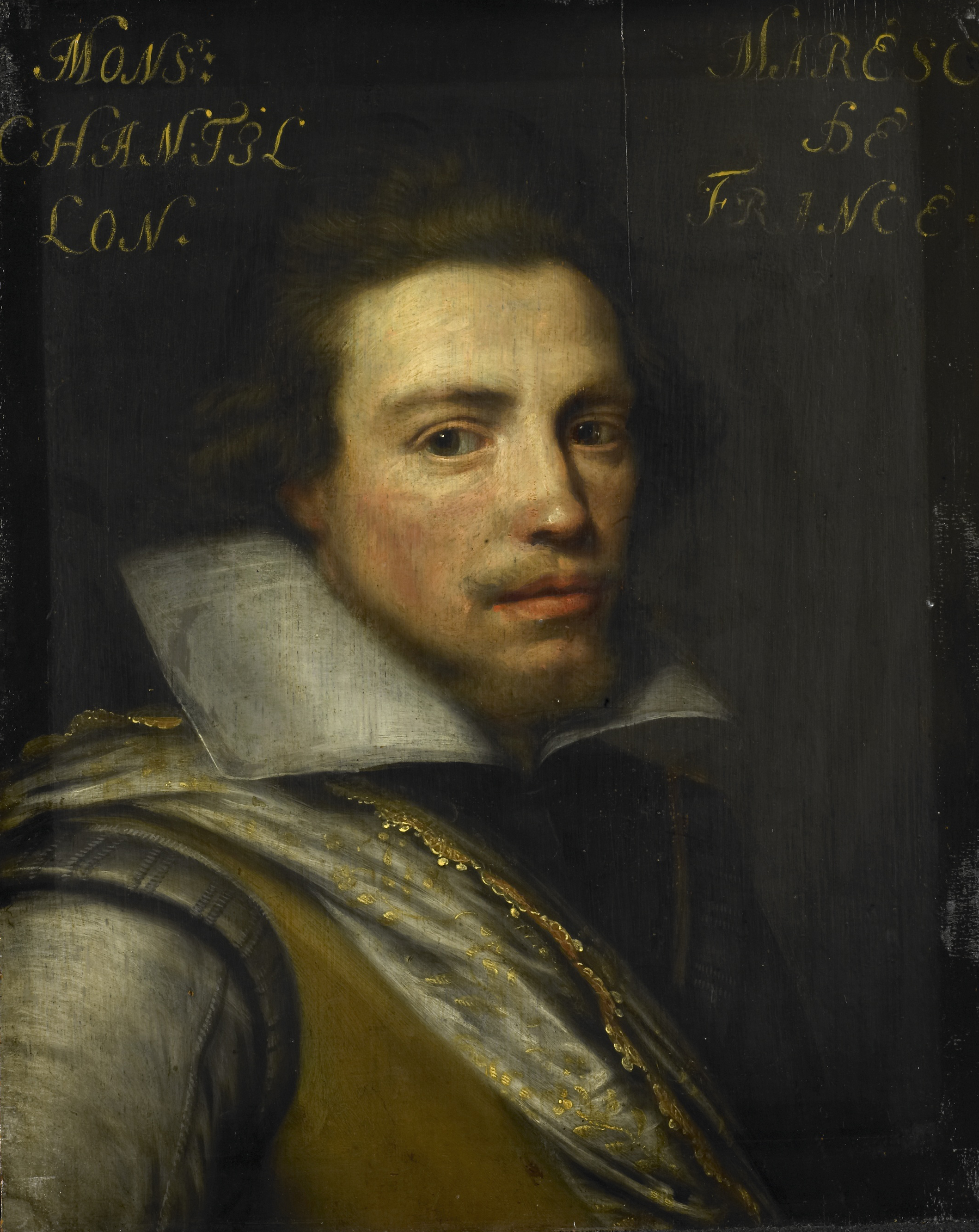
- Studio of Jan Antonisz van Ravesteyn
- Born: 26 July 1584; Montpellier, France
- Died: 4 January 1646 (aged 61); Châtillon, France
- Spouse: Anne de Polignac (m. 1615; died 1646)
- Relatives: House of Coligny
- Military career
- Allegiance: France
- Rank: Marshal of France
- Nickname: Maréchal de Châtillon
- Conflicts: Franco-Spanish War (1635–1659) • Battle of Les Avins • Siege of Leuven • Battle of Arras • Battle of La Marfée
- Awards: Peer of France

Gaspard III de Coligny, duc de Châtillon, (26 July 1584 – 4 January 1646) was a French Huguenot, who served under Louis XIII, and was appointed Marshal of France in 1622. He was described as "a mediocre general, but absolutely loyal".

== Early life ==
Châtillon was born 26 July 1584, in Montpellier. He was the son of François de Coligny (1557–1591) and Marguerite d'Ailly of the Château de Châtillon-Coligny. Among his siblings were Henri, Count of Coligny, who died in 1601 in the assault on Ostend, and Françoise (who married René de Talensac, Lord of Londrières).

His paternal grandparents were Huguenot leader Admiral Gaspard de Coligny, and his first wife, Charlotte de Laval (a daughter of Count Guy XVI de Laval). His maternal grandparents were Charles d'Ailly, Lord of Seigneville, and Françoise de Warty.

== Career ==
He served during the Franco-Spanish War (1635–1659) at Les Avins in 1635, and commanded the Army of Champagne at the Battle of La Marfée on 6 July 1641, where he was defeated.

He retired to Châtillon, where he died in 1646.

== Personal life ==
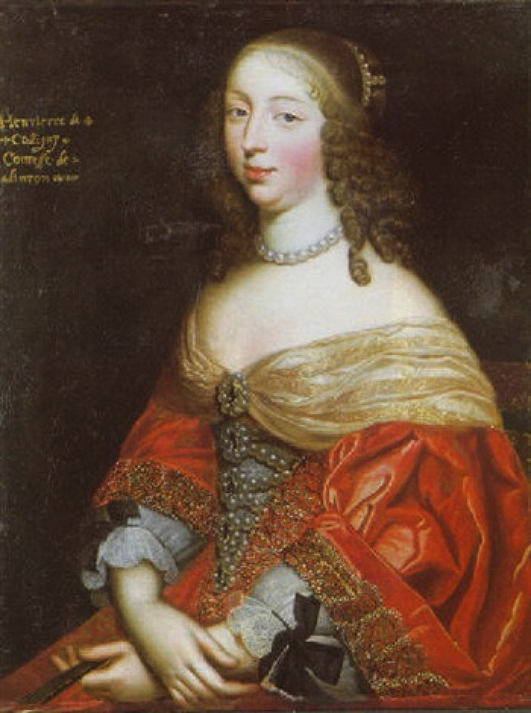
Portrait of his daughter, Henriette de Coligny, by the studio of Frères Beaubrun

On 13 August 1615, he married Anne de Polignac (1598–1651), the daughter of Gabriel de Polignac (not de Polignac), Lord of Saint-Germain, and Anne d'Albin de Valzergues. Together, they had four children:

- Henriette de Coligny (1618–1673), who married Thomas Hamilton, 3rd Earl of Haddington, eldest son of Thomas Hamilton, 2nd Earl of Haddington and Lady Catherine Erskine (daughter of the Earl of Mar), in 1643. After his death in 1645, she married Gaspard de Champagne, Count of La Suze, in 1647. Their marriage was annulled in 1661.
- Maurice de Coligny (1618–1644), who died unmarried.
- Gaspard IV de Coligny (1620–1649), who married Élisabeth-Angélique de Montmorency-Bouteville, daughter of François de Montmorency-Bouteville. After his death, she married Christian Louis I, Duke of Mecklenburg.
- Anne de Coligny (1624–1680), who married George II, Duke of Württemberg-Montbéliard, son of Louis Frederick, Duke of Württemberg-Montbéliard, in 1648.

The Duke died at Châtillon on 4 January 1646.

=== Descendants ===
Through his son Gaspard, he was a grandfather of Henri-Gaspard de Coligny (1649–1657), who was born after his father died and succeeded as Duke of Châtillon before he died young.

Through his daughter Anne, he was a grandfather of, among others, Eleonore Charlotte of Württemberg-Montbéliard (wife of Silvius II Frederick, Duke of Württemberg-Oels), Elizabeth of Württemberg-Montbéliard (wife of Frederick Ferdinand, Duke of Württemberg-Weiltingen), and Leopold Eberhard, Duke of Württemberg-Montbéliard.

== Family tree ==
Coligny family tree

Guillaume de Montmorency	Anne Pot
Gaspard I	Louise de Montmorency	Anne de Montmorency, 1st Duke of Montmorency	Madeleine of Savoy
Charlotte de Laval	Gaspard II	Odet	François	François de Montmorency	Henri	Charles de Montmorency-Damville
Louise	François	Charles	Paul de Coligny
Frederick Henry, Prince of Orange	Gaspard III	Guy XX de Laval
William II of Orange	Gaspard IV de Coligny	Henriette	Anne	George II of Württemberg-Montbéliard
William III of England	Eleonore	Leopold

Notes:

French nobility
Preceded by Henri de Coligny	Count of Coligny; Lord of Châtillon-sur-Loing; 1601–1643	Succeeded by Gaspard IV de Coligny
Preceded by Henri de Coligny	Duke of Coligny; 1643–1646	Succeeded by Gaspard IV de Coligny
