= Battle of Körmend =

- Part of the Austro-Turkish War (1663–1664)
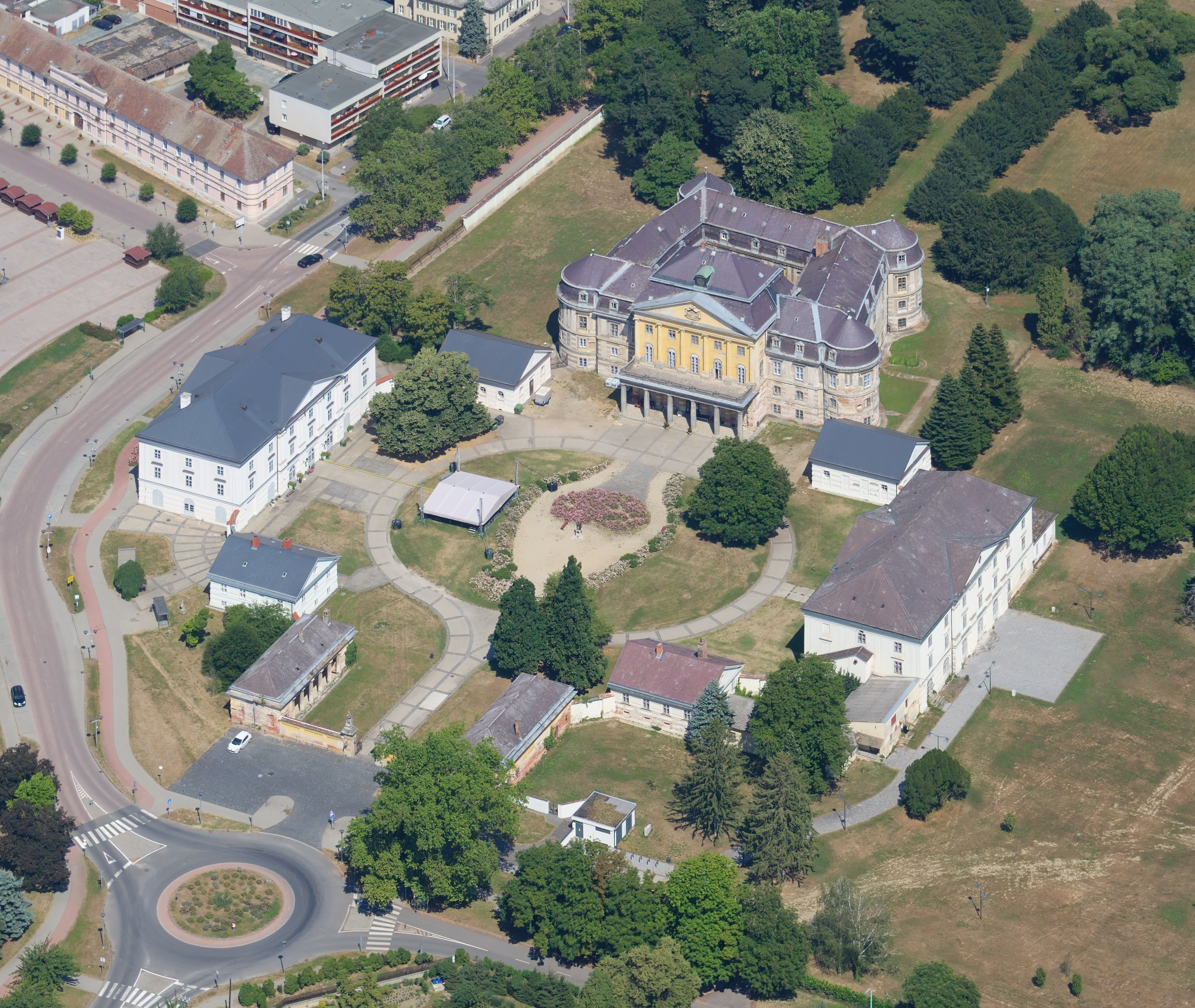
Date	26–27 July 1664
Location	Rába river, near the town of Körmend, Vas County, Hungary
Result	League victory

Belligerents
League of the Rhine: Kingdom of France; (Austria) Habsburg Monarchy; Holy Roman Empire; Margraviate of Baden; Kingdom of Hungary; Kingdom of Croatia	Ottoman Empire: Crimean Khanate

Commanders and leaders
Franz III. Nádasdy; Esterházy Pál (Holy Roman Empire) Wolfgang von Hohenlohe (Kingdom of France) Jean de Coligny-Saligny (WIA)	(Ottoman Empire) Köprülüzade Fazıl Ahmed Pasha

The Battle of Körmend was a military engagement that took place on June 26–27, 1664, as part of the Austro-Turkish War (1663–1664). Although not a major engagement in the broader context of the conflict, it nonetheless played a huge role in the subsequent Christian victory at the Battle of Saint Gotthard.

== Background ==
Grand Vizier Ahmed Köprülü wanted to take the ford of the Rába river in 1664 to move towards Vienna with his huge army. He was leading the Ottoman army to reinforce the defenders of Kanizsa castle. They took Új-Zrínyivár castle, then they were heading toward Vienna through Zala County. General Raimondo Montecuccoli deployed the Imperial troops along the line of the Rába River to fend off the Turks. The general sent Franz III. Nádasdy and his Hungarian and Croatian men to defend the ford at Körmend. Nádasdy was aided by the troops of Batthyány Kristóf, Chief Captain of the Trans-Danubian Region.

The first skirmishes took place on July 25 between Ottoman raiding parties and the Hungarian forces. However, the Christian troops did not want to engage the main Ottoman army in a large-scale battle just yet.

The soldiers of the French Count Jean de Coligny-Saligny and the men of Imperial Count Wolfgang von Hohenlohe arrived at Körmend on 26 July, along with the Hajdú warriors of Esterházy Pál. They occupied the crossable fords of the Rába river while the cannons of the castle were firing at the Ottoman army who made camp on the right bank of the river.

== Battle ==
On July 26, at around 2:00 PM, the garrison stationed at Körmend Castle commenced an artillery bombardment, targeting the Turkish encampment situated on the opposite riverbank. Meanwhile, Christian cavalry forces were positioned in close proximity to the shelling site. By the time the sun set, the defenders, consisting of French, Croatian, German, Austrian and Hungarian troops, had successfully reinforced and fortified their defensive positions.

The following day, on July 27, the Turks launched an attack against the bridge, which was being defended by Hungarian forces. However, with the arrival of French units, the Ottomans were ultimately repelled and driven back from the bridge. However, the low walls of the city did not provide adequate protection from the shots of the Ottoman cannons, and the French cavalry was most exposed to danger. In the fight, the commander-in-chief of the French, de Coligny, was also wounded.

When the cavalry of Montecuccoli arrived, the Ottomans decided to withdraw their army. However, Köprülü launched a final attack against the mounted riflemen of Baden, but the Germans inflicted great casualties among the assaulting Ottoman warriors. Seeing this, Köprülü issued the order of withdrawal.

== Aftermath ==
While the battle of June 26–27 was not a major engagement in the grand scheme of the conflict, it nonetheless played a meaningful role in setting the stage for the subsequent Christian victory at the Battle of Saint Gotthard. Although the entirety of the Ottoman army was not committed to this particular clash, the fact that the Christian defenders were able to hold their ground and prevent the enemy from crossing the river represented an important tactical success.

Following this engagement, the army of Köprülü continued its advance, while the Hungarian and Croatian forces of Nádasdy and Esterházy remained stationed at Körmend to monitor the river fords.
