= Jean de Coligny-Saligny =

French army commander

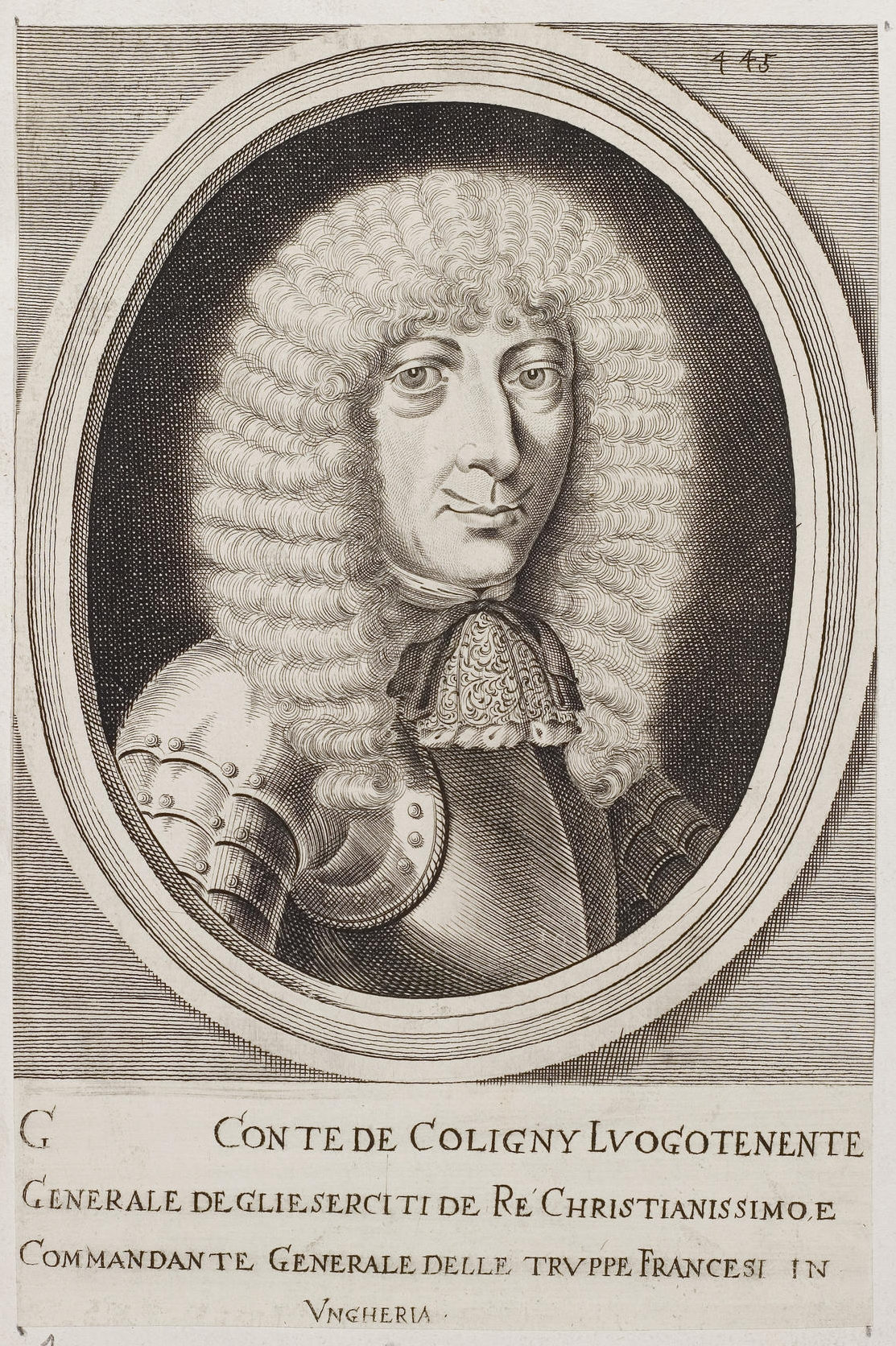
Jean de Coligny-Saligny

Jean de Coligny-Saligny, (Saligny, December 25, 1617 – April 16, 1686) was a French noble and army commander, best known for his part in the victory in the Battle of Saint Gotthard (1664).

He was the son of Gaspard II de Coligny-Saligny and Jacqueline de Montmorin Saint-Hérem, and thus a member of the well-known House of Coligny.

He first followed Louis, Prince of Condé (1621–1686) in his revolt against the King, but they had a dispute so serious, that Coligny reconciled himself with the court and became Condé's greatest enemy.

As lieutenant-general, he was sent to Hungary at the head of a corps of 6000 men, to help the Emperor stop an invasion by the Turks. Coligny played a crucial role in the Battle of Saint Gotthard (1664), in which the Turks were decisively defeated.

This battle was exceptional for the fact that French and Austrians, for once, fought on the same side.

Coligny wrote his Mémoires, which were only published in 1844 by Louis Monmerqué, and which are very negative for the prince of Condé. These memoires are now being reedited by Axor-Danaé.

Coligny married Anne Nicole Cauchon de Maupas and had 3 children.
