= Gaspard I de Coligny =

French soldier (1465/1470–1522)

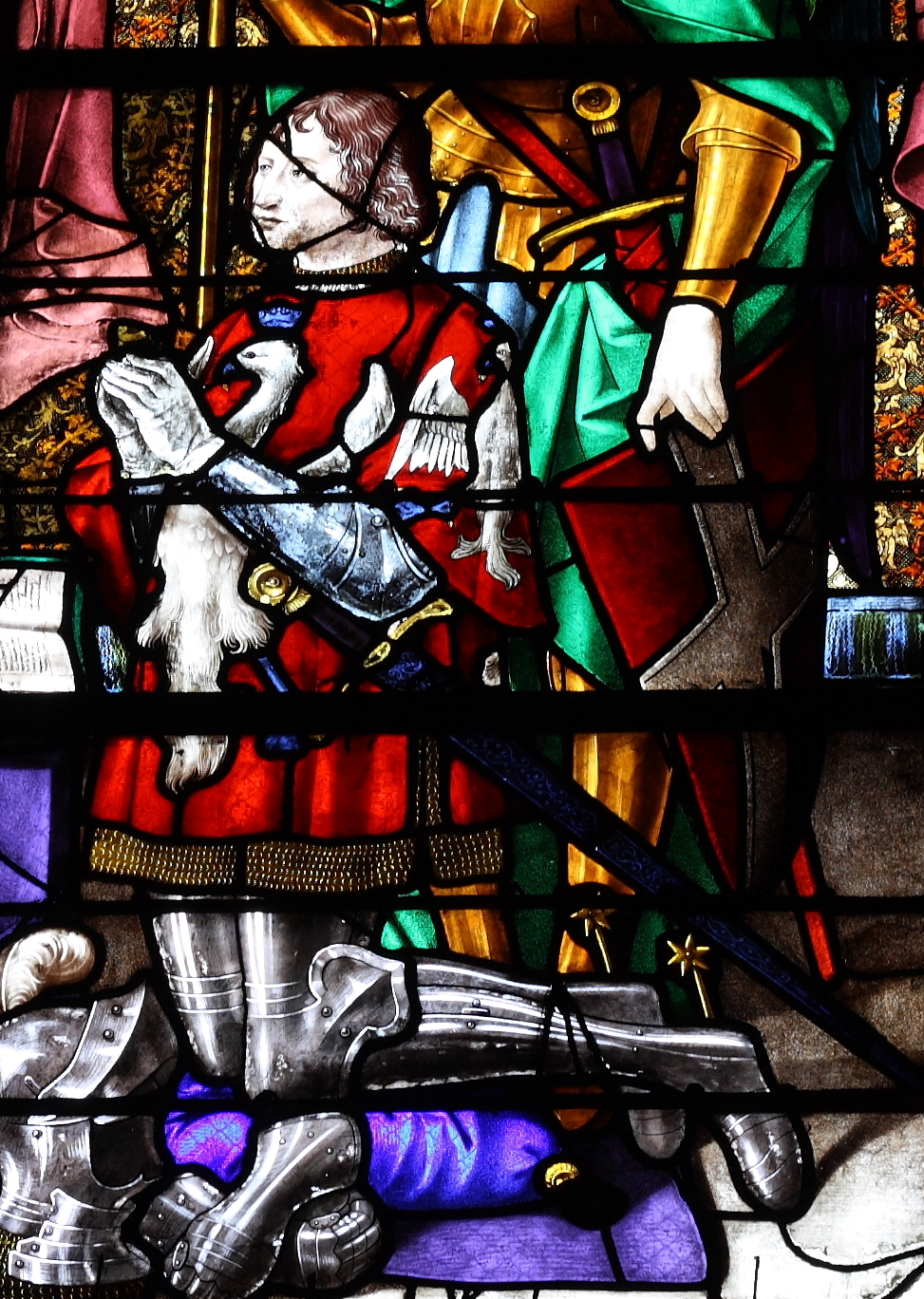
Gaspard I de Coligny, depicted on a stained-glass window in the collegiate church of Saint-Martin in Montmorency, Val-d'Oise.

Gaspard I de Coligny, Count of Coligny, seigneur de Châtillon (1465/1470–1522), known as the Marshal of Châtillon, was a French soldier and Marshal of France.

== Biography ==
He was born in Châtillon-Coligny. He was the youngest of the seven children of Jean III de Coligny and Éléonore de Courcelles and the second of their sons.

He served in the Italian Wars from 1495 to 1515 and distinguished himself at the Battle of Fornovo in 1495 under King Charles VIII.
When King Francis I invaded Milan, he fought in the Battle of Agnadello in 1509 and distinguished himself at the Battle of Marignano in 1515. For his services, he was created Marshal of France in 1516. He was simultaneously created a knight of the King's order.

He was made Lieutenant General in 1519, for the execution of the treaty of alliance with the King of England, and he attended the meeting in Northern France between the two sovereigns in 1520 , known as the Field of the Cloth of Gold. He subsequently served in Champagne and Picardy. The King granted him the use of the Principality of Orange.
He was then Lieutenant General in Guyenne, and commanded the troops sent to the relief of Fuenterrabía, but he died before arriving there, at Dax on 24 August 1522. His body was taken to Châtillon-sur-Loing where he was buried.

=== Titles and offspring ===
He became the seigneur de Châtillon following the death of his older brother, Jacques II de Coligny, in 1512. In the absence of his brother, the continuity of the house of Coligny rested with Gaspard. The possibility of the male line continuing was secured by his marriage to Louise de Montmorency in 1514.

By his wife, Louise de Montmorency, sister of Anne de Montmorency, he had three sons:

- Odet (1517–1571), Cardinal de Châtillon
- Gaspard (1519–1572), Admiral of France
- François (1521–1569), Seigneur d'Andelot

All three played an important part in the first period of the French Wars of Religion.

== Family tree ==
Coligny family tree

Guillaume de Montmorency	Anne Pot
Gaspard I	Louise de Montmorency	Anne de Montmorency, 1st Duke of Montmorency	Madeleine of Savoy
Charlotte de Laval	Gaspard II	Odet	François	François de Montmorency	Henri	Charles de Montmorency-Damville
Louise	François	Charles	Paul de Coligny
Frederick Henry, Prince of Orange	Gaspard III	Guy XX de Laval
William II of Orange	Gaspard IV de Coligny	Henriette	Anne	George II of Württemberg-Montbéliard
William III of England	Eleonore	Leopold

== Sources ==
- Ward, A.W.; Prothero, G.W.; Leathes, Stanley, eds. (1911). The Cambridge Modern History. Cambridge University Press.
- Louis de La Roque: Catalogue historique des généraux français, connétables, maréchaux de France, lieutenants généraux, maréchaux de camp. A. Desaide, Paris 1896–1902, p. 46
- Nicolas Breton, “Je les espreuve tous.” Itinéraires politiques et engagements religieux des Coligny-Châtillon (mi XVe-mi XVIIe siècle), Genève, Droz, Travaux d’Humanisme et Renaissance DCXII, 2019.
