= Duc de Châtillon =

Châtillon-Coligny coat of arms

Duc de Châtillon was a French noble title.

== Châtillon-sur-Loing ==
The first creation, in 1643, was for Gaspard III de Coligny, a Marshal of France, who was also known as duc de Coligny. The title referred to Châtillon-sur-Loing, a possession of the House of Coligny. He was also to have been made a peer of France at the same time, but the letters patent were never registered. His son Gaspard IV also bore the title, and died in 1649.

The dukedom was recreated in 1696 for Paul-Sigismond de Montmorency-Luxembourg, son of François-Henri de Montmorency, duc de Luxembourg. He had inherited the lordship of Châtillon from his aunt Angelique-Elisabeth de Montmorency, widow of the last duc de Châtillon. In 1713 he ceded the dukedom to his son, Charles-Paul-Sigismond, who received a brevet to be styled duc d'Olonne as his father retained the Châtillon title, though not the lands. In 1735 he in turn ceded the dukedom to his son Charles-Anne-Sigismond, who received a similar brevet as duc d'Olonne. On his death in 1777 he was succeeded by his son, Anne-Charles-Sigismond, who had previously inherited the duchy-peerage of Piney-Luxembourg. Both titles became extinct on the death of Charles-Emmanuel-Sigismond, duc de Montmorency-Luxembourg, in 1861.

== Châtillon-sur-Sèvre ==
Another creation, on 1 March 1736, referred not to Châtillon-sur-Loing but to Châtillon-sur-Sèvre. The grantee, who was also made a peer, was (Charles-)Alexis-Madeleine-Rosalie de Châtillon, a lieutenant-general in the army and governor of the Dauphin. The duchy-peerage became extinct on 15 November 1762 on the death of his son, Louis-Gaucher, who had served as Grand Falconer of France.
