= Saligny-sur-Roudon =

- Commune
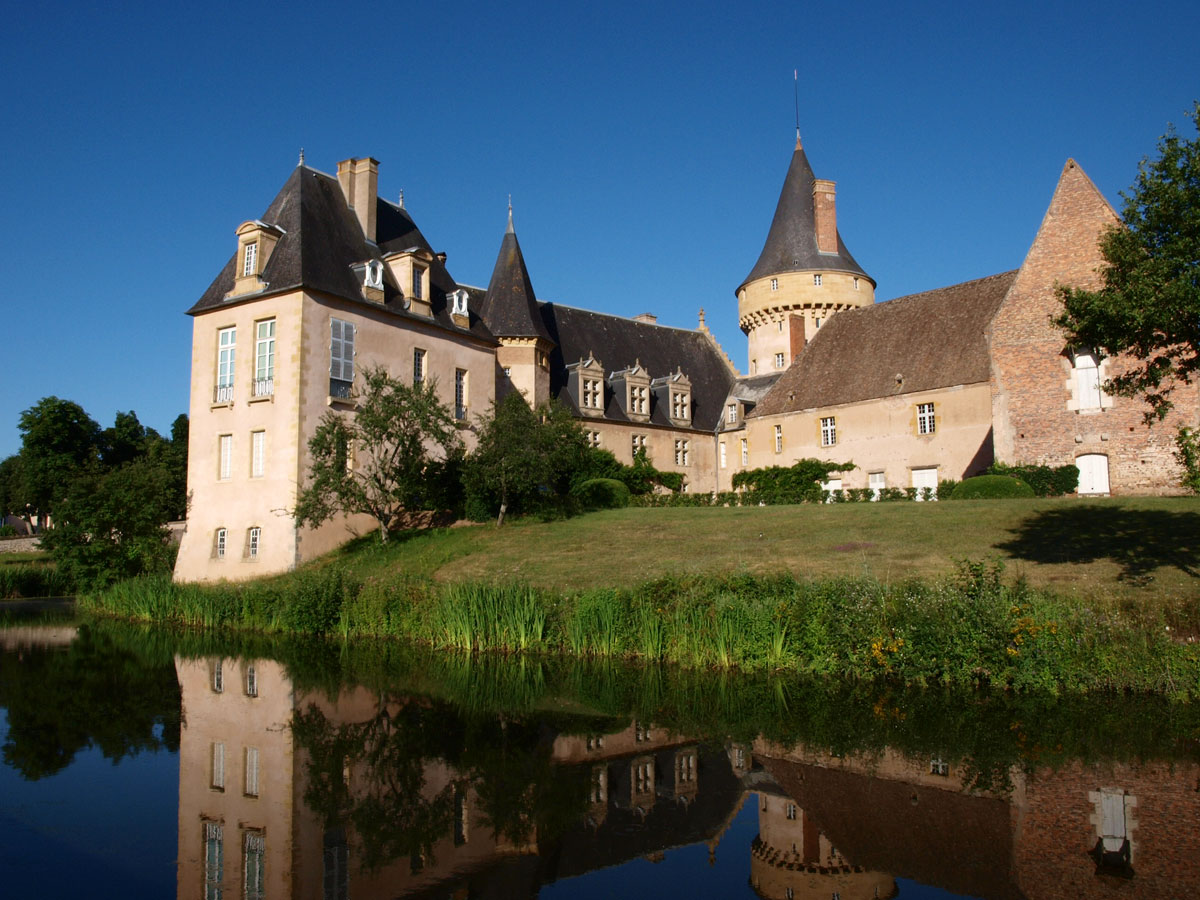
- Chateau

- Coat of arms
- Location of Saligny-sur-Roudon
- Location within France Location within Auvergne-Rhône-Alpes
- Coordinates: 46°28′08″N 3°45′02″E
- Country: France
- Region: Auvergne-Rhône-Alpes
- Department: Allier
- Arrondissement: Vichy
- Canton: Dompierre-sur-Besbre

Government
  - Mayor (2026–32): Sylvain Roux
- Area^{1}: 57.77 km^{2} (22.31 sq mi)
- Elevation: 280 m (920 ft)
- Highest elevation: 307 m (1,007 ft)
- Lowest elevation: 227 m (745 ft)
- Population (2023): 641
  - Density: 11.1/km^{2} (28.7/sq mi)
- Time zone: UTC+01:00 (CET)
  - Summer (DST): UTC+02:00 (CEST)
- INSEE/Postal code: 03265 /03470
- ^{1} French Land Register data, which excludes lakes, ponds, glaciers > 1 km^{2} (0.386 sq mi or 247 acres) and river estuaries.

Saligny-sur-Roudon (French pronunciation: [saliɲi syʁ ʁudɔ̃]) is a commune in the Allier department in Auvergne-Rhône-Alpes in central France.

== Population ==
Historical population
Year	Pop.	±% p.a.
1968	1,093	—
1975	992	−1.38%
1982	906	−1.29%
1990	811	−1.38%
1999	766	−0.63%
2007	810	+0.70%
2012	723	−2.25%
2017	681	−1.19%
2023	641	−1.00%
Source: INSEE

== See also ==
- Communes of the Allier department
