= Tanlay =

- Commune
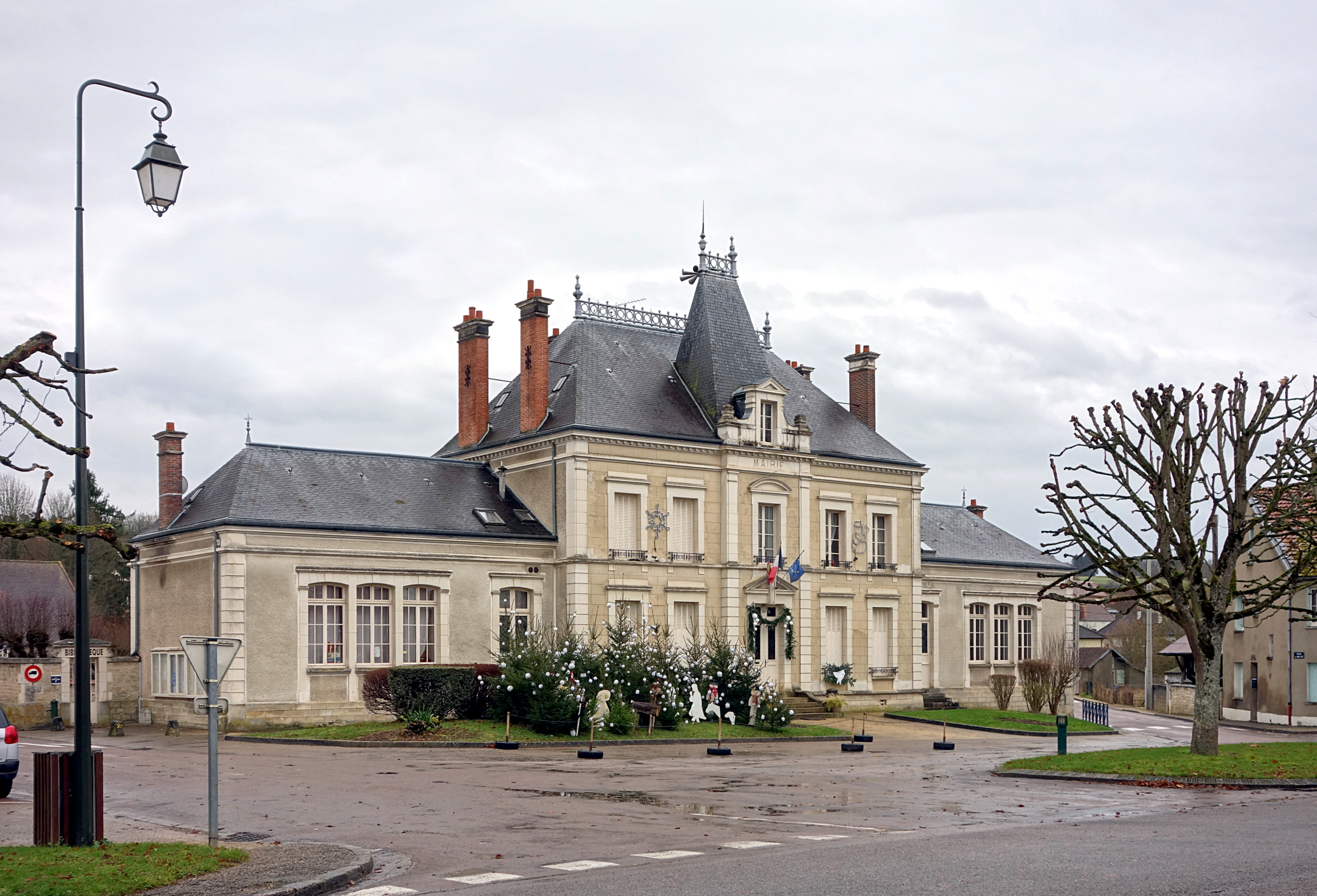
- The town hall in Tanlay

- Coat of arms
- Location of Tanlay
- Location within France Location within Bourgogne-Franche-Comté
- Coordinates: 47°50′50″N 4°05′15″E
- Country: France
- Region: Bourgogne-Franche-Comté
- Department: Yonne
- Arrondissement: Avallon
- Canton: Tonnerrois

Government
  - Mayor (2020–2026): Éric Delprat
- Area^{1}: 38.66 km^{2} (14.93 sq mi)
- Highest elevation: 278 m (912 ft)
- Lowest elevation: 140 m (460 ft)
- Population (2023): 897
  - Density: 23.2/km^{2} (60.1/sq mi)
- Time zone: UTC+01:00 (CET)
  - Summer (DST): UTC+02:00 (CEST)
- INSEE/Postal code: 89407 /89430
- ^{1} French Land Register data, which excludes lakes, ponds, glaciers > 1 km^{2} (0.386 sq mi or 247 acres) and river estuaries.

Tanlay (French pronunciation: [tɑ̃lɛ]) is a commune in the Yonne department in Bourgogne-Franche-Comté in north-central France.

== See also ==
- Château de Tanlay
- Communes of the Yonne department
