= Revermont =

Natural region in France

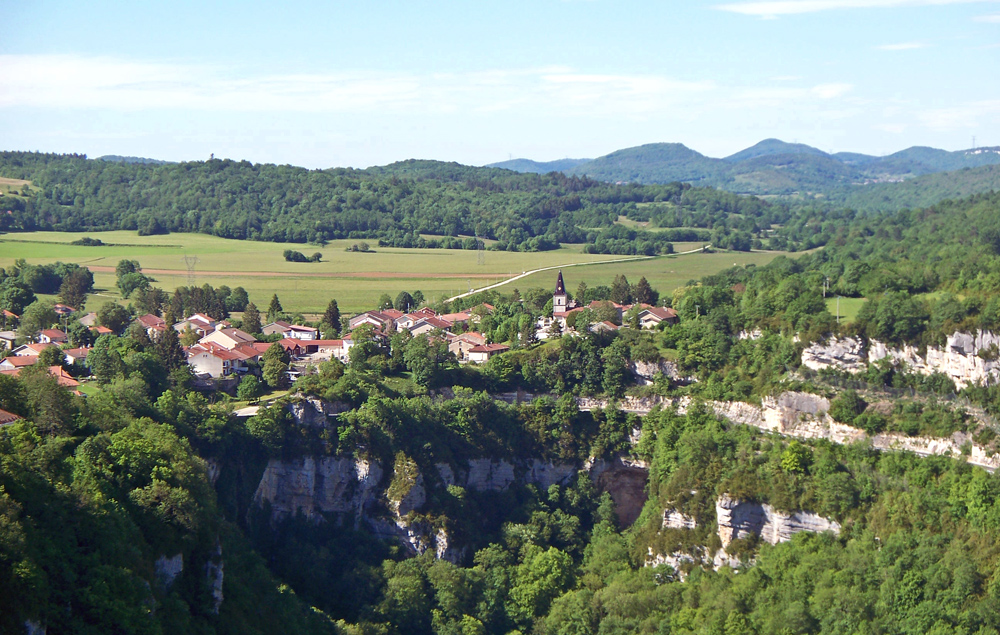
- Landscape of Revermont in Corveissiat

- Location within France Location within Auvergne-Rhône-Alpes
- Coordinates: 46°16′54″N 5°11′52″E
- Country: France
- Regions: Auvergne-Rhône-Alpes; Bourgogne-Franche-Comté
- Departments: Ain; Jura; Saône-et-Loire

Area
  - Total: 500 km^{2} (190 sq mi)

Revermont (French pronunciation: [ʁəvɛʁmɔ̃]) is a natural region of France located in the departments of Ain, Jura, and a small portion of Saône-et-Loire.

== Geography ==
Geographically defined as the western foothills of the Jura Massif, the Revermont is characterized by limestone relief situated north of the Rhône-Alpes region and southwest of the Jura Massif. It extends from Lons-le-Saunier in the north to the Ain River in the east and the town of Pont-d'Ain in the south. It stretches west to east across the Bresse plain, bordered by Departmental Road 1083 linking Bourg-en-Bresse to Lons-le-Saunier, paralleled by the A39 motorway, towards the Suran Valley and then to the Ain Valley.

Dotted with villages, the hillsides of the Revermont extend from Pont-d'Ain to Lons-le-Saunier along the Bresse plain. Sparsely populated, it is a region of low to medium mountains that encompasses typical villages. The viticultural tradition has largely disappeared except on the edge of the Jura near Lons-le-Saunier, and the activity of stone quarries has declined in recent years.

Once a land of vineyards, it has preserved numerous stone vineyard houses typical of the region.

== History ==
=== Toponymy ===
The term "Revermont" first appeared in 974. It derives its name from "Reversus Montis," meaning "the reverse of the mountain." The region's name has been recorded in various forms over the centuries, including "Reversimontis" in 1084, "Revermont" from 1270, "in Reversomonte" in 1283, "Reversi Montis" in 1289, "Revermontis" in 1304, "in Reversimonte" in 1329, and "Forestas de Reversomonte" in 1416.

=== Prehistory ===
The first human traces in the Revermont region date back to around 120,000 years ago. Flint tools, such as arrow and spear points, have been discovered in Ceyzériat, evidencing early human activity.

=== Middle Ages ===
During the Middle Ages, the mountains of Revermont marked the western boundary of a vast territory owned by the Coligny family, known as the "Manche des Coligny."

In 1283, Robert II, Duke of Burgundy, captured the Revermont region, took Treffort, and proceeded to Bourg where Prince Amadeus was already present. In 1285, Otto IV, Count of Burgundy relinquished his suzerainty over Revermont to Duke Robert II. On August 16, 1285, the Dauphin of Viennois acknowledged the suzerainty of the Duke of Burgundy over Revermont.

In 1289, the Duke of Burgundy sold the Revermont to Amadeus V, Count of Savoy for 16,000 livres in silver and 800 livres in land, while retaining the northern part of the region around Cuiseaux.

== In literature ==
Several writers have settled in the region, including two authors who were awarded the Prix Goncourt in 1957 and 1968:

- Roger Vailland spent the last ten years of his life in Meillonnas, where his house can be seen in the village, and where he is buried. In Meillonnas, Roger Vailland wrote some of his most important works, such as La Fête and La Truite, which partly take place in the region, as well as L'Éloge du cardinal de Bernis. Many of the names he gave to his characters are borrowed from the names of Revermont communes, such as Verjon, a character in La Truite, and Courmangoux, a maiden name in La Truite. In La Fête, Philippe Legrand, the second-in-command of a ship, has an affair with a passenger named Jeanne Treffort.
- Bernard Clavel, a native of Lons-le-Saunier, returned to settle in La Courbatière, a hamlet in the commune of Courmangoux, after extensive travels. He notably wrote the La Grande Patience series, a four-volume cycle set in the region. The final volume, Les Fruits de l'hiver, earned Bernard Clavel the Prix Goncourt in 1968.
- Other writers also associate themselves with the Revermont, such as the poet Jean-Claude Pirotte, who published a collection entitled Revermont.
