= Henriette de Coligny de La Suze =

French poet and writer

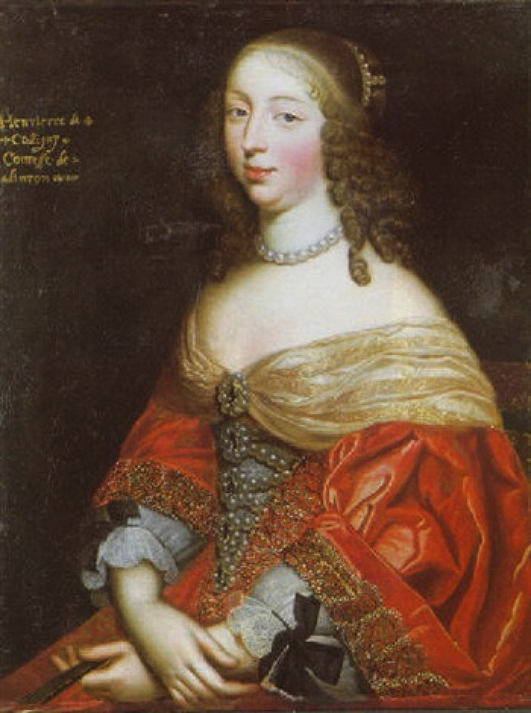
Studio of Frères Beaubrun - Henriette de Colligny, Countess of Haddington

Henriette de Coligny de La Suze (1618 – March 10, 1673) was a French writer, salon holder and lady-in-waiting to Anne of Austria.

== Early life ==
She was one of four children born to Anne de Polignac and Gaspard de Coligny, Duc de Châtillon, who served under Louis XIII, and was appointed Marshal of France in 1622.

Her paternal grandfather was François de Coligny and her great-grandfather was the Huguenot leader Admiral Gaspard de Coligny.

== Writing career ==
In 1666, she published a collection of 21 of her poems as Poésies de Madame la Comtesse de La Suze but she also contributed verse and prose to many other collected works. Ninety-five of her poems appear in "L'amour raisonnable", part of Recueil de pièces galantes en prose et en vers; each poem is preceded by a preamble in prose.

== Personal life ==
She was married twice: first, in 1643, to Thomas Hamilton, 3rd Earl of Haddington, who died in February 1645, and then, in 1647, to Gaspard de Champagne, comte de la Suze. Originally a Protestant, she converted to Catholicism in 1653. Her second marriage was annulled in 1661 on the grounds of impotence. Boileau, the oracular critic, had already decided in 1700 that his elegies were infinitely pleasing. One of his friends, Father Le Moyne, a Jesuit specialist in worldly devotion, attributed to him a beautiful Latin motto, Non urar tacita (I cannot burn and remain silent).

=== Legacy ===
De La Suze was admired by the writers Madeleine de Scudéry and Paul Pellisson.
