= Louise de Coligny =

Princess consort of Orange (1555–1620)

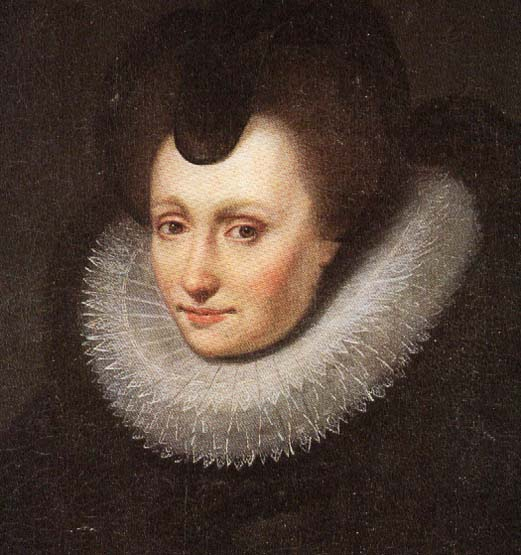

Princess consort of Orange
- Tenure: 24 April 1583 – 10 July 1584
- Born: 23 September 1555; Châtillon-sur-Loing, Kingdom of France
- Died: 9 November 1620 (aged 65); Fontainebleau, Kingdom of France
- Spouse: Charles de Teligny William I, Prince of Orange (m. 1583)
- Issue: Frederick Henry, Prince of Orange
- House: Coligny
- Father: Gaspard II de Coligny
- Mother: Charlotte de Laval
- Religion: Huguenot

Louise de Coligny (French pronunciation: [lwiz də kɔliɲi]; 23 September 1555 – 9 November 1620) was a princess consort of Orange as the fourth and last wife of William the Silent. She was the daughter of Gaspard de Coligny, seigneur de Châtillon, and Charlotte de Laval.

== Biography ==
Louise was born at Châtillon-sur-Loing into an old and powerful House of Coligny. Her parents saw to it that she received a humanist education.

When she was sixteen, she married Protestant Charles de Téligny (1571). Both he and her father were murdered at the St. Bartholomew's Day massacre. Like her murdered father, she was a French Huguenot and after the massacre (August 1572 -Paris), she spent ten years in the Swiss Confederacy.

Nicolas Mius, Governor of Marseille, worked for Louise de Coligny’s father Admiral Gaspard II de Coligny as an interpreter. On August 25, 1572, Nicolas Mius was a victim of the St. Bartholomew’s Day Massacre. On this day the Admiral told those with him “to save yourselves.” Everyone left Admiral Gaspard II de Coligny except Nicolas Mius, who stayed by the Admiral's side and was murdered with him. Following the Admiral's death, his wife Countess Jacqueline de Montbel took Nicolas Mius’ children under her wing and adopted his son whom she sent to her Mother to raise in her care along with her daughter, Beatrice. Jacqueline then put Nicolas' daughters, Charlotte Mius d’Entremont and Louise Mius d’Entremont, into the care of her stepdaughter, Louise de Coligny, Princess of Orange, who raised them. Countess Jacqueline signed documents to which all Nicolas Mius’ descendants, whether male or female, would carry the name and coat of arms of Jacqueline's father, Count d’Entremont.

Louise then married William the Silent on 24 April 1583. She became the mother of Frederick Henry in 1584, William's fourth legitimate son and future prince of Orange. It is said that she warned her husband about Balthasar Gérard, because she thought him sinister. Catholic Gérard murdered William in July 1584 in Delft.

After her second husband was murdered, she raised their son and William's six daughters from his third marriage to Charlotte of Bourbon. During her life she remained an advocate for Protestantism and she corresponded with many important figures of that time, like Elizabeth I of England, Henry IV of France, Marie de' Medici and Philippe de Mornay, as well as with her many stepchildren. She remained in the Dutch Republic until 1620, after the denouement of the political conflict between her stepson, stadtholder Maurice, Prince of Orange (William the Silent's son by his second wife Anna of Saxony), and the Land's Advocate of Holland, Johan van Oldenbarnevelt. After Oldenbarnevelt was sentenced to death in the Trial of Oldenbarnevelt, Grotius and Hogerbeets, she and the French ambassador Benjamin Aubery du Maurier tried in vain to have the death sentence commuted.

She died (65) at Fontainebleau.

== Ancestry ==
Ancestors of Louise de Coligny

8. Jean III de Coligny
4. Gaspard I de Coligny
9. Éléonore de Courcelles
2. Gaspard II de Coligny
10. Guillaume de Montmorency
5. Louise de Montmorency
11. Anne Pot
1. Louise de Coligny
12. Jean de Laval
6. Guy XVI de Laval
13. Jeanne du Perrier
3. Charlotte de Laval
14. Jacques de Daillon
7. Antoinette de Daillon
15. Jeanne d'Illiers
