= Eleonore Charlotte of Württemberg-Montbéliard =

- Born: 20 November 1656; Horburg
- Died: 13 April 1743 (aged 86); Wrocław
- Spouse: Silvius II Frederick, Duke of Württemberg-Oels
- House: House of Württemberg
- Father: George II, Duke of Württemberg-Montbéliard
- Mother: Anne de Coligny

Eleonore Charlotte of Württemberg-Montbéliard (20 November 1656 – April 1743) was by marriage Duchess of Oels-Württemberg.

== Life ==
Charlotte Eleanor was a daughter of the Duke George II of Württemberg-Montbéliard (1626–1699) from his marriage to Anne (1624–1680), the daughter of Gaspard III de Coligny.

On 7 May 1672, she married Duke Silvius II Frederick of Württemberg-Oels in Oleśnica. The marriage remained childless.

In 1676, Charlotte Eleanor acquired the Lordship and town of Twardogóra and moved her residence there. She expanded the town extensively at her own expense, and supported new inhabitants. In 1688, she replaced the church by a larger one. She obtained a tax exemption for the town's residents for 100 years from Emperor Leopold I.

In 1712, she had a legal dispute with Anna Sophia of Mecklenburg-Schwerin (1647–1726), the widowed Duchess of Württemberg-Juliusburg. She lost the case and had to transfer Twardogóra to Anna Sophia.
