= Guy XX de Laval =

Guy XX de Laval, François de Coligny (6 May 1585 – 3 December 1605) was the Count of Laval (Mayenne) and Baron of Quintin. He was son of Guy XIX de Laval, himself a son of François de Coligny d'Andelot, and Anne d'Algère.

In 1588, Anne d'Algère took him to Sedan so that he could be raised as a Protestant. In April 1605, however, Guy XX de Laval converted to Catholicism.

Near the end of 1605 he led an expedition in Hungary against the Turks and died in combat on December 3 of that year.

He was the last Count of Laval to take the name of Guy.

== See also ==
- House of Laval

== Bibliography ==
- Malcolm Walsby, The Counts of Laval: Culture, Patronage and Religion in Fifteenth and Sixteenth-Century France (Ashgate, Aldershot, 2007)
