= Châtillon-Coligny =

- Commune
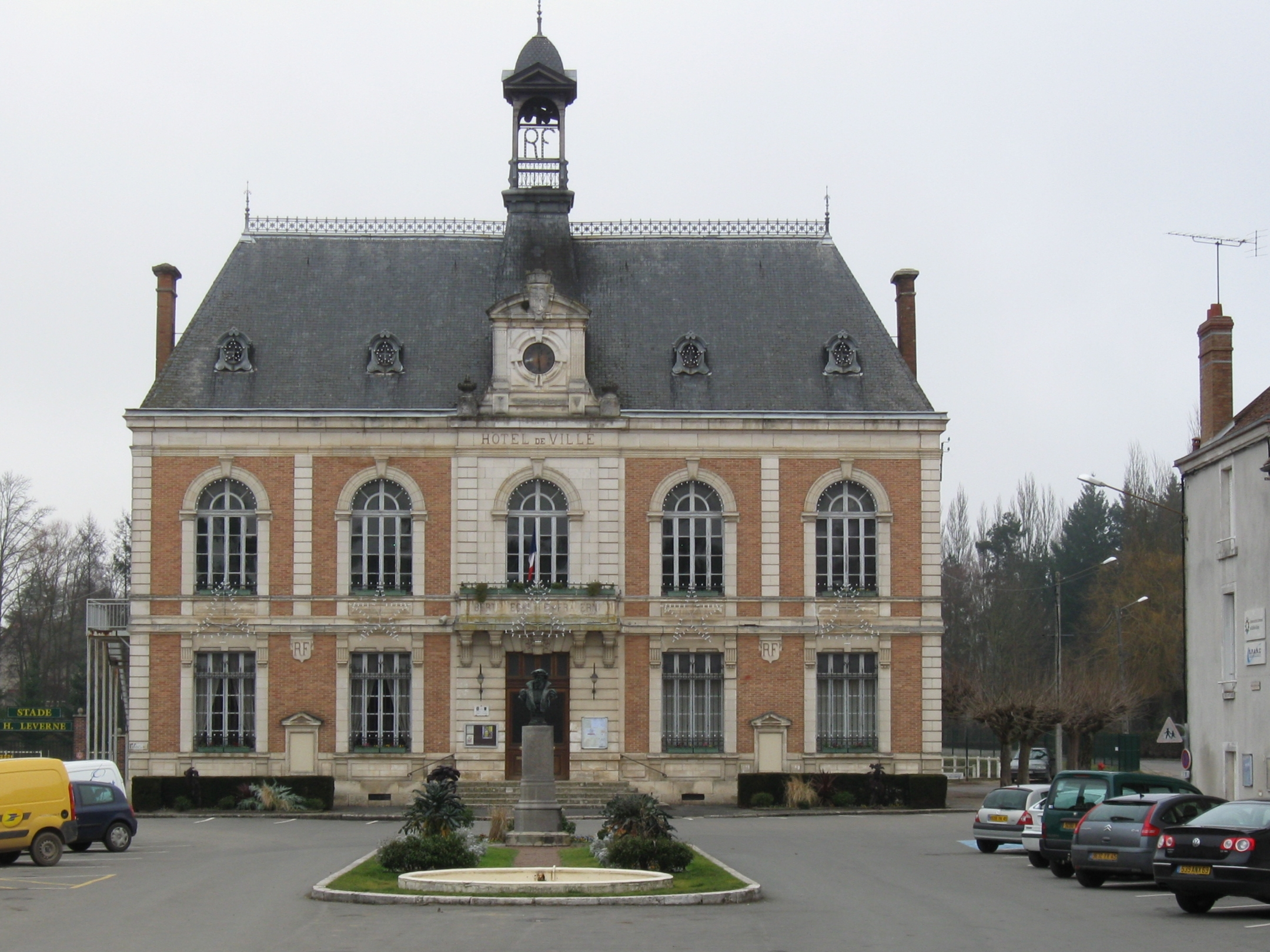
- The town hall in Châtillon-Coligny

- Coat of arms
- Location of Châtillon-Coligny
- Location within France Location within Centre-Val de Loire
- Coordinates: 47°49′25″N 2°50′50″E
- Country: France
- Region: Centre-Val de Loire
- Department: Loiret
- Arrondissement: Montargis
- Canton: Lorris
- Intercommunality: Canaux et Forêts en Gâtinais

Government
  - Mayor (2020–2026): Florent De Wilde
- Area^{1}: 25.53 km^{2} (9.86 sq mi)
- Highest elevation: 179 m (587 ft)
- Lowest elevation: 115 m (377 ft)
- Population (2023): 1,894
  - Density: 74.19/km^{2} (192.1/sq mi)
- Demonym: Châtillonnais
- Time zone: UTC+01:00 (CET)
  - Summer (DST): UTC+02:00 (CEST)
- INSEE/Postal code: 45085 /45230
- Website: www.chatillon-coligny.fr
- ^{1} French Land Register data, which excludes lakes, ponds, glaciers > 1 km^{2} (0.386 sq mi or 247 acres) and river estuaries.

Châtillon-Coligny (French pronunciation: [ʃatijɔ̃ kɔliɲi]) is a commune in the Loiret department in north-central France.

The Loing and the Briare Canal run through the town.

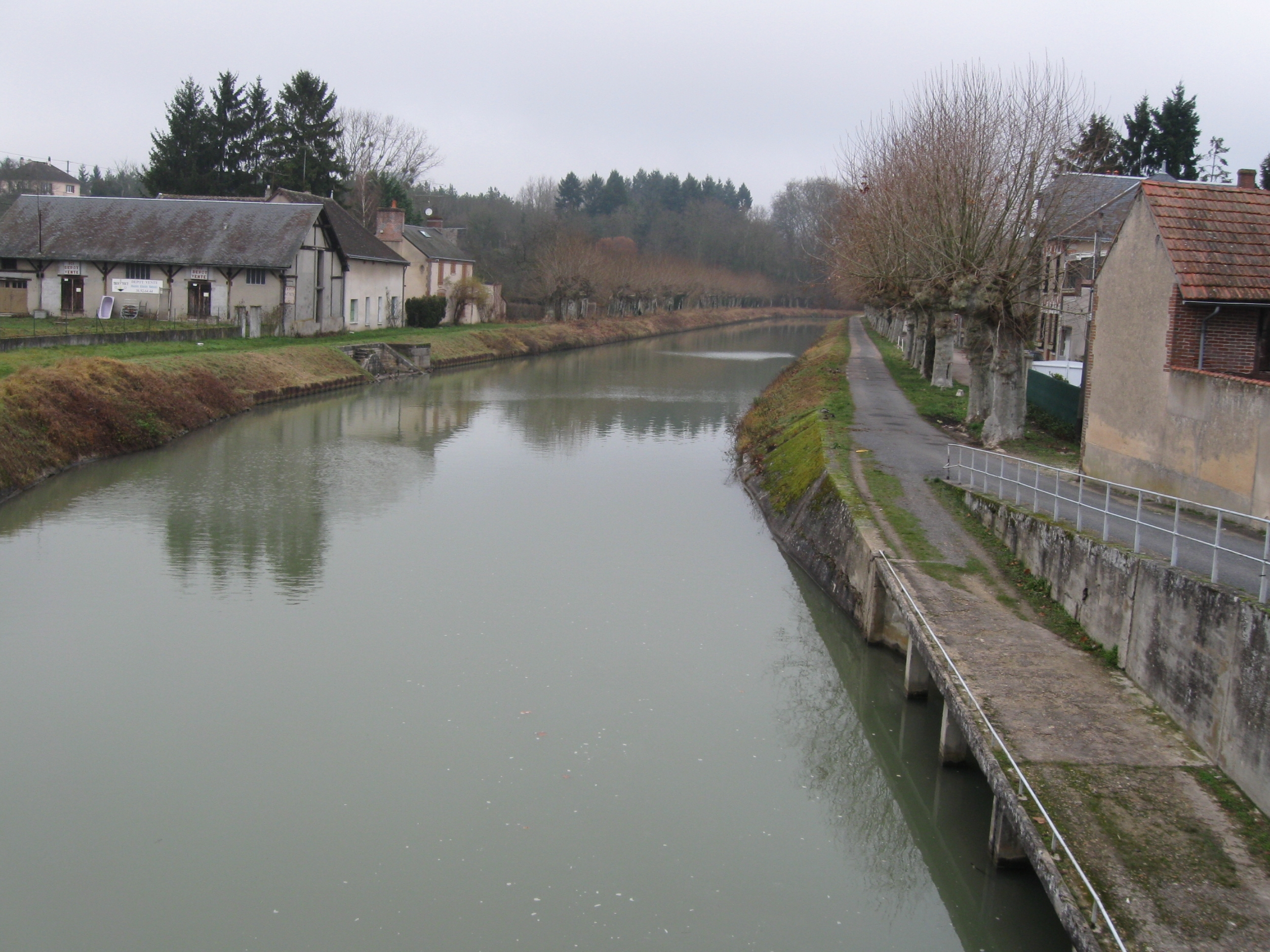
The Briare Canal in Châtillon-Coligny

== Sights and monuments ==
- Château de Châtillon-Coligny

== Notable people ==
- Gaspard I de Coligny (c.1465-1522), seigneur of Châtillon, born in Châtillon-sur-Loing.
- Odet de Coligny, cardinal de Châtillon, (1517-1571), eldest son of Gaspard I, born in Châtillon-sur-Loing, converted to Calvinism, poisoned.
- Gaspard II de Coligny (1519-1572), seigneur de Châtillon, Comte de Coligny and Admiral of France, second son of Gaspard I, born in Châtillon-sur-Loing, leader of French Protestantism, assassinated during the St. Bartholomew's Day massacre.
- François de Coligny d'Andelot (1521-1569), third son of Gaspard I, also one of the leaders of French Protestantism during the French Wars of Religion, born in Châtillon-sur-Loing.
- Louise de Coligny, (1555-1620), daughter of Gaspard II de Coligny, married Charles de Téligny on 26 May 1571. Her husband was killed in the St. Bartholomew's Day massacre. On 12 April 1583, she married William of Orange, who was also assassinated. She was born in Châtillon-sur-Loing.
- Isabelle Angélique de Montmorency, Duchess of Châtillon (1627-1695), widow of Gaspard IV de Coligny.
- Antoine César Becquerel (1788-1878), scientist, born in Châtillon-Coligny in 1788.
- Henri Becquerel (1852-1908), physicist who discovered natural radiation in 1896, born in Châtillon-Coligny.
- Colette (1873–1954), author of the Claudine novels and Gigi. The town was the second childhood home of the famous writer.
- Jacques Adnet (1900-1984) and his twin Jean Adnet, architects and decorators, were born in the commune.

== See also ==
- Communes of the Loiret department
- Raynald of Châtillon
