= D'Entremont (surname) =

d'Entremont or D'Entremont is a surname, originally French. People with this surname include:

- Benoni d'Entremont (c. 1745–1841), mariner, shipbuilder, office holder, justice of the peace, and militia officer in Nova Scotia
- Chris d'Entremont, MP (born 1969), Canadian politician
- Dave D'Entremont (1961–2013), American professional 10-pin bowler
- Drance d'Entremont, river in Switzerland
- Haag & d'Entremont, American architecture firm
- Henry d'Entremont (1859–1920), Canadian merchant and political figure
- Jacqueline de Montbel d'Entremont (1541 – 1599), French courtier, possible artistic muse and Huguenot
- Paul Theodore d'Entremont, AIA, (1908–1988), American designer and architect
- Philippe Mius d'Entremont, 1st Baron of Pobomcoup (c. 1609–1701), early settler of Acadia, and progenitor of the Muise and d'Entremont families of Canada
- Raymond Neri d'Entremont (1875–1974), Nova Scotian fish merchant and politician
- Rose-Irène d'Entremont (1943– ), Canadian, Acadian entrepreneur, recipient of Order of Canada and Order of Nova Scotia
- Simon d'Entremont (1788–1886), farmer and political figure in Nova Scotia of Acadian descent
- Yvette d'Entremont, also known as SciBabe, American public speaker, science blogger, and former analytical chemist

== See also ==
- D'Autremont
