= Dominique Berninger =

American architect

- Born: May 31, 1898; France
- Died: December 5, or December 6, 1949; Pennsylvania, United States
- Occupation: Architect
- Awards: 1939 Philadelphia Competition for Housing projects (slated to work on Germantown Housing Project with Edmund R. Purves - George S. Idell Group (but project didn't go ahead.) Various (see listed alongside works)
- Practice: Partner in Carswell, Berninger & Bower (ca. 1933-1935), Berninger & Bower (1935-1945) Berninger, Haag & d'Entremont (1946)
- Buildings: New York World's Fair French Pavilion (1939)

Dominique Berninger AIA (1898–1949) was a French-born American architect based in Jenkintown, Pennsylvania, United States, who practiced nationally in the mid twentieth century but particularly in Pennsylvania. He is best known for his design of the French Pavilion for the New York World's Fair of 1939. Together with Louis Kahn, he founded the short-lived Architectural Research Group (ARG) in Philadelphia. He was a partner in the firms of Carswell, Berninger & Bower (ca. 1933–1935), Berninger & Bower (1935-1945) and Berninger, Haag & d'Entremont (1946)

== Early life and education ==
Born May 31, 1898, in Schiltigheim, Alsace (at the time part of Germany, soon to be part of France again), Berninger attended high school in Darmstadt, Germany, then went on to be educated in Paris, France, first at a preparatory school, then college, finally graduating from the École Centrale des Arts et Manufacturers.

== Architectural career ==
Upon coming to America, Berninger worked for Zantzinger, Borie and Medery, Architects of Philadelphia from 1925 to 1932. During this time he served as job captain for their design project of the Sheffield Scientific School at Yale University, New Haven, Connecticut, a project that cost around $1,250,000.

With Louis Kahn, who was also an employee of Zantzinger, Borie & Medary, he formed the Architectural Research Group in Philadelphia "for the group study of Housing and Slum Clearance." During the whole of the ARG's brief existence, 1932 to 1935, Berninger acted as its president.

In 1933, Berninger started to practice independently, initially in partnership with John Arnold Bower (born 2/1/1901, died 1/20/1988) and Harold Thorp Carswell (born 3/25/1886, died 1/1/1940) as Carswell, Berninger & Bower, renamed Berninger & Bower when Carswell left the firm in 1935.

The most expensive and important work of his career was The French pavilion on the Court of Peace at the 1939 New York World's Fair, which was the grand open space northeast of the Theme Center. It ran such a celebrated restaurant that after the fair closed and World War II ended, the restaurant remained in New York City – and soon established itself (as Le Pavilion) as one of the finest French dining establishments in the city. Henri Soulé moved from the French Pavilion at the fair to open Le Pavillon, taking Pierre Franey along as head chef.

At Berninger & Bower, Harold Haag worked as a draftsman and after the partnership dissolution in 1945, Berninger took Haag and Paul d'Entremont into partnership in 1946 as Berninger, Haag & d'Entremont. However, it seems that he left this firm the same year, which took the name of Haag & d'Entremont (practicing from the old offices of 445 Cedar Street, Jenkintown, Pennsylvania 19046.)

Dominique Berninger died in late 1949 while undergoing surgery for lung cancer.

== Works as Berninger & Bower ==
- 1939: New York World's Fair French Pavilion (client: French Government; cost: $1,500,000; demolished 1940)
- Academy of the New Church Elementary School, Bryn Athyn, PA. (cost $70,000) 0
- 1946: Academy of the New Church Elementary School and Dormitories, Bryn Athyn, PA. (cost $300,000)
- George Deming Residence, Philadelphia (cost $75,000)
- Dufur Hospital Addition, Ambler, for the Dufur Hospital, Inc. (cost $35,000)
