= Clarence Clark Zantzinger Jr. =

American architect (1904–1993)

Clarence Clark Zantzinger Jr. (1904–1993) was an American architect.

Zantzinger was born in Philadelphia on October 12, 1904, to architect Clarence C. Zantzinger and Margaret Shippen Buckley. Like his father, he attended St. Paul's School, graduating in 1922. He then earned a B.A. from Yale University in 1926 and B.Arch. and M.Arch. degrees from the University of Pennsylvania in 1929 and 1930; in 1928 he also studied at the École des Beaux-Arts in Fontainebleau. He worked as a draftsman in his father's firm, Zantzinger, Borie & Medary, from 1928 to 1933, and in 1935 formed a partnership with H. Martyn Kneedler, later joined by Henry D. Mirick. The firm, Kneedler, Mirick & Zantzinger, "designed office buildings, hospitals, churches, museums, schools and houses in the Philadelphia area," according to his New York Times obituary. He retired in 1969. At least one of his buildings, the Berwind-Purcell House north of Longview, Washington, is listed on the National Register of Historic Places.

In the 1950s, Zantzinger served on the Philadelphia Mayor's Council on Penn Center and the Citizens' Council for City Planning, "when redevelopment was changing the face of the downtown."

He served as director or other corporate officer in several organizations, including the Fairmount Park Art Association, for which he served as president from 1969 to 1980.

He married Mary Amory Cook; his nephew was the filmmaker Gei Zantzinger. He died at his home in Haverford, Pennsylvania, on November 21, 1993.
