= Entremont =

Entremont may refer to:

- Entremont, Haute-Savoie, a municipality of the Haute-Savoie département in France
- Entremont (district), a district of the canton of Valais in Switzerland and was a canton of the former Simplon département of the French Empire
- Entremont (oppidum), a Gaulish oppidum near Aix-en-Provence in southern Gaul, chief town of the Salyes
- Philippe Entremont (born 1934), French pianist and conductor

== See also ==
- D'Entremont (surname)
