= Clarence C. Zantzinger =

American architect (1872–1954)

- Born: 1872; Philadelphia
- Died: 1954 (aged 81–82)
- Spouse: Margaret Shippen Buckley (m. 1903)
- Parent(s): Alfred Zantzinger; Sarah Crawford Clark
- Relatives: Enoch White Clark (grandfather)

Clarence Clark Zantzinger (1872–1954) was an American architect and public servant in Philadelphia, Pennsylvania.

== Life ==
Clarence was born in Philadelphia, the son of Alfred Zantzinger (1839–1873) and Sarah Crawford Clark. Alfred was a medical doctor who was born on June 27, 1839, in Philadelphia to George Zantzinger, a grand-nephew of David Rittenhouse, and Caroline Helmuth. Alfred entered the University of Pennsylvania in 1855, graduated from Philadelphia's Hahnemann Medical College in 1862, and became a volunteer surgeon with the First Troop Philadelphia City Cavalry. In January 1863, Alfred married Clark, the daughter of Philadelphia financier Enoch White Clark. When their son was born in 1872, they named him for Sarah's brother Clarence Clark. Alfred died of typhoid in Philadelphia on August 15, 1873. Sarah later married C. George Currie, a rector of St. Luke's Church in Philadelphia.

Zantzinger attended private school in Germany, then St. Paul's School in Concord, New Hampshire. He matriculated at Yale University's Sheffield Scientific School, where he was a member of the senior S.S.S. Society and graduated with a degree in civil engineering in 1892. Three years later, he earned a B.S. in architecture at the University of Pennsylvania. He then spent two years at the École des Beaux-Arts in Paris, where he worked under Paul Blondel and Henri Grisors and graduated in 1901.

He returned to Philadelphia, set out his shingle, and soon received his first commission: a building to house the West Philadelphia branch (today, the Walnut Street West branch) of the Free Library of Philadelphia. By 1905, he and Charles L. Borie, Jr. (a fellow graduate of St. Paul's School) had launched a firm of their own with offices at 251 South 4th Street in Philadelphia. They were joined in 1910 by Milton Bennett Medary, and the firm was renamed Zantzinger, Borie & Medary, which specialized in institutional and civic projects.

In 1903, Zantzinger joined the American Institute of Architects; eight years later, the group made him a fellow. He served for years on the group's National Committee on Foreign Relations and Education; he also served as president of the Philadelphia chapter. Zantzinger was also a member of the T-Square Club; he directed its atelier and served on its education committee.

In 1906, he was elected to the board of directors of the Pennsylvania Academy of the Fine Arts.

In 1917, Zantzinger became a diplomat: President Woodrow Wilson appointed him to represent the U.S. on the War Trade Board in Sweden as a member of the U.S. legation in Stockholm.

He also served on the National Capital Parks and Planning Commission and as president of Philadelphia's City Parks Association.

In 1951, he retired from his firm, by then renamed Zantzinger & Borie.

== Works ==
Among his works were:

- William Penn Charter School, Germantown, Pennsylvania.
- Pennsylvania Athletic Club, Philadelphia.
- Bryn Mawr Hospital, Bryn Mawr, Pennsylvania
- The bank building of E.W. Clark & Co., southeast corner of S. 16th and Locust Streets in Philadelphia.
- St. Paul's Church, Chestnut Hill, Pennsylvania.
- Crescent Avenue Presbyterian Church, Plainfield, New Jersey.
- The administration building for the Sheffield Scientific School at Yale.
- The redevelopment of his uncle's estate in West Philadelphia for Philadelphia Divinity School; today, the public Penn Alexander elementary school
- The Men's dormitory group, University of Chicago.
- Department of Justice Building, Washington, D.C.
- Public Administration Building, University of Chicago.
- Graduate Cottage, Overbrook School for the Blind, Overbrook, Pennsylvania.
- Nurses Home, Abington Hospital, Abington, Pennsylvania.
- Warehouse for the Philadelphia Navy Yard.
- Private house, 8500 Seminole Avenue, Philadelphia

== Family ==
In 1903, Clarence married Margaret Shippen Buckley (d. Jan. 16, 1958), part of a prominent Philadelphia family that descended from John Buckley (1664–1732), of Wiltshire, England, who in 1681 became one of the first people to purchase land in the colony of Pennsylvania from William Penn. She was a daughter of iron manufacturer Edward Swift Buckley and granddaughter of Matthew Brooke Buckley (1794–1856), a president of the Philadelphia, Wilmington and Baltimore Railroad from 1842 to 1846. Matthew was the son of Daniel Buckley (1761–1827), a lawyer and former member of the Assembly of Pennsylvania.

In 1922, Clarence and Margaret lived at "Greenacre", their house at Seminole and Highland Avenues in Chestnut Hill, Pennsylvania.

They had at least four children:

1 Clarence Clark Zantzinger Jr. (1904-1993), who followed his father to St. Paul's, Yale, Penn, and the Ecole des Beaux Arts; then joined Zantzinger, Borie & Medary as a draftsman; and finally struck out on his own as an architect. His firm, Kneedler, Mirick & Zantzinger, "designed office buildings, hospitals, churches, museums, schools and houses in the Philadelphia area," according to his New York Times obituary. He served as director or other corporate officer in several organizations, including the Fairmount Park Art Association, for which he served as president from 1969 to 1980. He married Mary Amory Cook, a daughter of Navy Vice Admiral Arthur Byron Cook (1881-1952), an early naval aviator.
2 Alfred Zantzinger (1907-1972), who also attended St. Paul's, married Mary Geist in 1937. Alfred worked stints at the E.W. Clark & Co. financial house, the Philadelphia Suburban Water Company, and as vice-president of the Pennsylvania Academy of the Fine Arts. Their son Gei Zantzinger became a noted filmmaker.
3 Sarah Clark Zantzinger married Harry C. Groome Jr., who went on to become a senior vice-president of N. W. Ayer & Son, the country's oldest advertising agency.

4 Mary Vaux Zantzinger (1910-1987), who married John Wister Wurts (1907-1972). Wurts, who lived as a child on Philadelphia's Portico Row, graduated from Princeton University in 1931 and served in Europe during World War II, winning the Legion of Merit.
