= Jacqueline de Montbel d'Entremont =

French courtier

Jacqueline de Montbel d'Entremont (16 February 1541 – 17 December 1599) was a French courtier, possible artistic muse and Huguenot, known for her experiences during the French wars of religion. After her first husband's death, she converted to Protestantism and married Gaspard II de Coligny, who was later killed in the St. Bartholomew's Day Massacre.

She has no known or proven connection to the ancestors of Philippe Muis d’Entremont, Baron de Pombocoup.

== Life ==
=== Early life ===
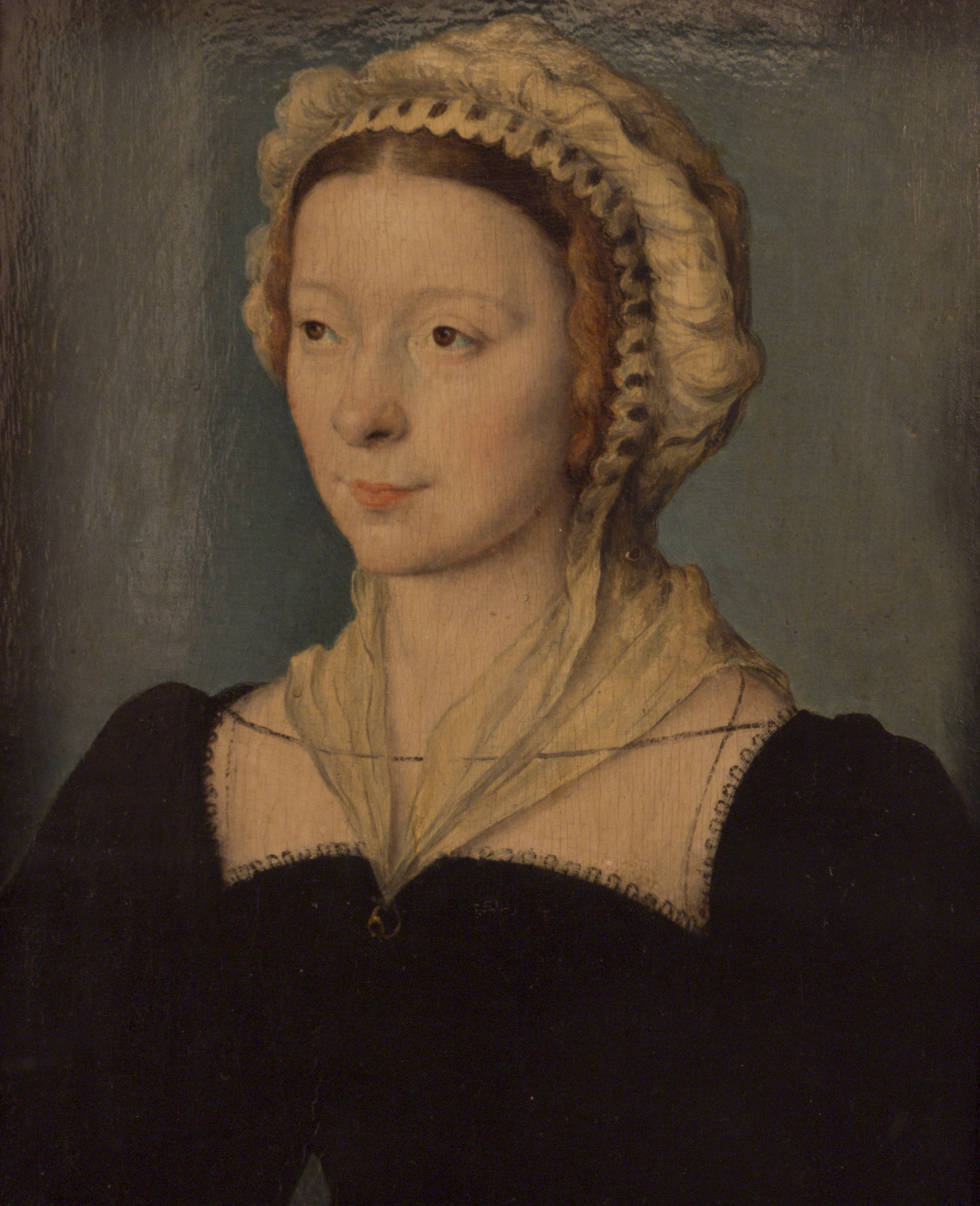
Jacqueline's mother Beatrix in 1533 by Corneille de Lyon.

Jacqueline was born 16 February 1541, in a house near the Louvre Palace, Paris, the only daughter and sole heir of the Montbel d'Entremont family, a family with several fiefdoms in Savoy, Bresse, Bugey and Piedmont. Her mother was Béatrix Pacheco, a young Spanish woman of Portuguese descent. Béatrix's father was Jean, Count of Cifuentes and Duke of Escalona, who was descended from Juan Pacheco da Silva, a Portuguese page who had gone to serve the prince of the Asturies around 1440, fought with distinction at the battle of Olmedo and was made Duke of Escalona by the king of Castille and Leon. A drawing of Béatrix by Jean Clouet is now at the Musée Condé. She was maid of honour to Queen Eleanor of Habsburg (1498-1558), sister of Charles V, Holy Roman Emperor - on the death of Eleanor's first husband Manuel I of Portugal. In 1521 Eleanor remarried in 1530 to Francis I of France and moved her Spanish courtiers and ladies in waiting into the Louvre Palace - one of them was Béatrix. Louise de Montmorency, countess of Coligny and mother of Gaspard de Coligny was also in the Louvre at around the same time, whilst another of Eleanor's ladies in waiting was Diane de Poitiers.

After the Duchy of Savoy was occupied by French troops in 1536, the lords of Savoy were all invited to the French court. Charles III, Duke of Savoy fell and was forced into exile in Nice, forcing the lords to abandon Turin and go to meet Francis I. One of them was Sébastien, count of Entremont and Montbel, lord of Montellier, Natage and Saint-Maurice. In Paris he met Béatrix and married her on 17 September 1539 in the presence of the Dauphin (the future Henry II of France), Jean de Menthon, Philibert de Gilly and Louise de Montmorency, wife of Gaspard I de Coligny. Their only daughter and heir Jacqueline was born in Paris on 16 February 1541 and grew up in the Louvre until she was six.

When Francis I died in 1547 his widow Eleanor took refuge in the Spanish Netherlands, home of her sister Mary of Hungary. Béatrix and Jacqueline went with her and Jacqueline remained in the royal court in Brussels until she was sixteen, at which age she was chosen to be maid of honour to princess Marguerite of France (1523-1574), Henry II's sister and future duchess of Savoy via her marriage to Emmanuel-Philibert de Savoie. Jacqueline thus returned to the Louvre in 1557, whilst her mother moved to the château de Saint-André at Briord in Bugey.

The Duke of Savoy beat the French at the battle of Saint-Quentin in 1557 and two years later the treaties of Cateau-Cambrésis agreed to the gradual evacuation of the French occupation forces from Savoy and Piedmont. However, he had to fight hard to defend his territories from incursions by Protestant forces from Geneva and by French forces which still held certain strategic positions. He recalled the Savoyard noblemen who had been in the French court for the last twenty-five years and gave them posts in his new army and government. He also forbade Savoyard noblewomen from marrying foreigners or Protestants, so that estates of Savoy remained in Savoy's hands. His biggest prize was the comte de Montbel (they had a family connection and the duke had been baptised in the arms of the count's paternal great aunt in 1528) and the duke demanded that he come to court for the duke to present him with the collar of the Supreme Order of the Most Holy Annunciation. However, he placed two conditions on its presentation - "when she reaches marriageable age, Jacqueline must marry a Savoyard lord of identical rank and of Catholic religion. The safety of the States of Savoy is at stake."

=== First marriage ===
The French court became a battleground between Protestant and Catholic factions until 30 June 1559, when Henry II of France died of wounds incurred at a joust he had organised in honour of his sister Marguerite's marriage to Emmanuel-Philibert, Duke of Savoy. Henry's son Francis II of France succeeded him and his wife Mary became queen consort. Francis entrusted ruling the kingdom to princes of the House of Guise, accelerating the French Wars of Religion. He died himself in 1560 and his younger brother Charles succeeded him aged only ten years old. Real power lay with the regent, his mother Catherine de Medici.

Aged twenty, plans arose to marry Jacqueline to a French lord, despite her father's assurances that she would marry a Savoyard. Her mother favoured Claude de Bastarnay, the nephew of Diane de Poitiers, who she had served alongside as a lady in waiting to Eleanor. De Bastarnay, count of Bouchage and baron of Anthon, was the son of René de Bastarnay and Isabelle de Savoie (daughter of René de Savoie, known as "the Great Bastard of Savoy". In his Histoire de la Bresse et du Bugey, Samuel Guichenon states that the marriage "had great difficulty in succeeding, since -as the countess Jacqueline was extraordinarily rich and powerful in estates - the Duke of Savoy, her natural prince, wished her to marry one of his lords. However, king Charles IX having written in favour of the comte du Bouchage, their marriage took place on 16 February 1561.".

Basternay was kept away from his young wife fighting as a Catholic in the Wars of Religion and so the marriage remained childless. He was killed at the Battle of Saint-Denis, where the Protestant forces were led by Jacqueline's future second husband Gaspard II de Coligny. The 74-year-old constable Anne de Montmorency (1493-1567) was shot in the back by a Protestant whilst being captured - he was the uncle of both Basternay (his sister-in-law Isabella of Savoy's son) and Coligny (his sister Louise's son).

=== Second marriage ===
Jacqueline took refuge with her mother at Briord where she met her old friend the Savoy poet Marc-Claude de Buttet and Théodore de Bèze, previously part of the 'brigade of poets' who were the forerunners of La Pléiade of Ronsard, who she had previously known at the Louvre. De Buttet had taken refuge in his village at Tresserve beside Lac du Bourget - he had been a protégé of Odet de Coligny and Margaret of France. He chose Béatrix Pacheco Da Silva as his muse and his platonic love, giving her the alter-ego of Amalthea. Twelve years later, Jacqueline d'Entremont arrived at Henry II's court and took over from her mother as de Buttet's muse on her return from Brussels. She may also have taken over the pseudonym of Amalthea, though historians are still divided on which woman exactly is behind that name.

Théodore de Bèze was then a Protestant minister in Geneva, famous for his conviction and eloquence - he converted the countess of Entremont to Protestantism and she went on to abjure Catholicism officially at the Duke of Savoy's high court. Bèze was also a close friend of admiral Gaspard II de Coligny, leader of the French Protestants. They both took part in the Colloquy of Poissy between 9 and 26 September 1561, disputing with Catholic theologians.

Despite the Colloquy's setbacks, Bèze and Coligny went on to get the twelve-year-old Charles IX to sign the Edict of January 1562, also known as the Edict of Tolerance, which gave French Protestants official legal recognition and the right to gather for worship in certain villages. However, this settlement was broken by the Massacre of Wassy by Francis, Duke of Guise's troops on 1 March 1562 and the religious wars broke out again. Francis was stabbed by an assassin on 18 February 1563 and died of his wounds six days later - in his Histoire Eccleésiatique, Bèze wrote that "Solemn thanks were rendered with great rejoicings" for Francis' death.

On 3 March 1568 Coligny's wife Charlotte de Laval died - they had had eight children and he grieved deeply for her. Bèze advised Jacqueline to marry Coligny - she had met him many times at the Louvre since her return from Brussels in 1557 and knew him well, whilst both their mothers had both been ladies in waiting to Eleanor (Coligny's mother had been summoned to court for that purpose in 1530 and Coligny and his brothers Odet and François came with her and studied alongside the king's children).

Coligny was unenthusiastic about the match, feeling preoccupied by his campaigning, thinking that the twenty-three-year age-gap between them was too large and self-conscious about the major wound which he had received on 3 October 1569 at the battle of Moncontour against a royal force under the future Henry III (he had been shot in the face by the Rhingrave, though he had managed to fire back at point blank range and defeat him). Even so, Bèze insisted in a letter to Renée of Ferrara: "Mme d'Entremont is a lady endowed with virtues and God's rarest gifts, and is one of the richest jewels of the land in which she lives". He insisted that Coligny "work towards this union as it pleases God" and managed to convince him of the match.

In deep secrecy Jacqueline rode across France with a small escort, meeting no obstacles, and she and Coligny signed their marriage contract in the house of François III, count of La Rochefoucauld on 24 March 1571 in the presence of Jeanne d'Albret, Henry of Navarre, François de Bourbon-Conti and Louis of Nassau. The nuptial blessing took place the following day, 25 March, at La Rochelle, then a Protestant fiefdom.

The Duke of Savoy still banned all his subjects from marrying outside Savoy under pain of confiscation of their lands via his 31 January 1569 Edict of Turin. However, he was unable to prevent Jacqueline's second marriage and contemporary chroniclers report that she "uniquely sensible of Coligny's merit, had resolved (if necessary) to sacrifice the most shining fortune for the sake of having him as her husband".

=== Saint Bartholomew's Day Massacre ===
Four months pregnant, Jacqueline was kept in safety at the Château de Châtillon-Coligny. Coligny foresaw the threat to his family, since he was blamed for the death of Francis, Duke of Guise. He was invited to Paris at the head of a delegation of French Protestant lords to attend the marriage of Charles IX of France's sister Margaret of Valois to her cousin Henry of Navarre (the future Henry IV). On 22 August 1572 an attempt was made on his life with a crossbow and though he was only wounded in the arm he took no further precautions, seemingly resigned to death. Late at night on 23–24 August 1572 it was agreed among the royal leadership to assassinate Coligny and the other leading Protestant nobles in Paris, a hit squad under the duke of Guise went out, however the assassinations would soon spiral out of control, a general massacre beginning in which several thousand died in Paris, and thousands more across France. The day before the attack, he had written a last letter to his wife - "My Mie, I write you this letter to warn you that the wedding of Milady, the king's sister, took place today... If I only regarded my contentment, I would be better pleased to come see you than to stay at court for many reasons that I will tell you... Several small peculiarities have occurred that I have omitted to tell you but which I shall tell you in person... And yet I pray that Our Lord will have in his holy guard you, my daughter, my sister.".

Her servants at Châtillon were imprisoned and Jacqueline, her stepdaughter Louise de Téligny and two servants had to await a verdict from the king and Catherine de Medici. This proved to be expulsion from France and in mid-September 1572 twenty-five cavalrymen accompanied them to the château de Saint-André at Briord, where Jacqueline's mother was waiting. Jacqueline thus found herself back on Savoyard territory and back under the rule of the Duke of Savoy.

On 21 December 1572 Jacqueline gave birth to a daughter and named her Beatrice after Jacqueline's mother. One of the conditions of Jacqueline's return to Savoy was not only her conversion back to Catholicism but also that her child should be baptized a Catholic - the baptism took place almost in secret and without ceremony at the parish church in Briord, in the presence of some servants and the child's grandmother. Coligny's wish that his friend Frederick III, Elector Palatine should be a godfather was ignored and he did not know of the birth. Exhausted by the birth, Jacqueline entrusted Béatrice to a wet nurse under the supervision of Jacqueline's mother.

Louis Milliet, president of the Senate of Savoy, managed to persuade the Duke not to send the child to his court at Turin as he had intended - the Duke had imagined that a plot was being hatched to kidnap the child since it was the heir to the fiefdoms of Montbel, but Milliet pointed out that count Sébastien de Montbel's will stated that "only the first male heir, born of his sister Jacqueline, shall be heir after her, to continue its name and its arms, and females will be debarred." However, Jacqueline refused to renounce her Protestantism, kept up a correspondence with the Protestants in Basel, received ambassadors from Geneva and on 15 January 1573 commanded the polemicist François Hotman to write a biography glorifying Coligny. This risked the fiefdoms of Montbel on Savoy's frontier falling into foreign Protestant hands should Jacqueline marry a third time and so the Duke of Savoy proposed that she come to Turin to clarify the situation. She was won over by this proposal, since she still had strong support at the court in Turin - she had previously been maid of honour to the duke's wife Margaret at the Louvre and Margaret had kept up excellent relations with Protestant families, secretly sending them financial support.

On 22 February 1573 Jacqueline and her Savoyard escort had got as far as col du Mont-Cenis, where they were surprised to learn that the Duke was awaiting them at Nice, to which he had been displaced. She was therefore forced to re-route and meet him there, guarded by twelve Piedmontese archers commanded by André Provana de Leyni. Ending her journey with a leg at sea, Jacqueline was imprisoned in the fortress at Nice on her arrival on 8 March. This provoked general outrage and several ambassadors were sent by her mother and by the Calvinists - for example, on 7 October 1574 Henri, Prince of Condé requested that a special case be made for his aunt, stating "If you take pity on my aunt ... and wish to free her from captivity and the prison in which she is so strictly detained and return all her lands and her full liberty, you can be assured of receiving this thanks, that she shall bear herself with such modesty in subjection and obedience as she must, that you shall have no other occasion to complain of her." However, the Duke stood firm and insisted that she renounce her Protestantism and resume her loyalty to him.

Even after much manoeuvring and a journey to Turin and back, Jacqueline still refused to renounce her Protestantism in the forms insisted on by the Duke and the Catholic hierarchy. She lost a major supporter when Margaret died in Turin on 15 September 1574 and finally renounced Calvinism on 7 April 1575, with the bishop of Nice François de Lambert receiving her back into the Catholic faith. She then signed an agreement at Nice on 1 May 1575 that committed her to house arrest after two years and three months' imprisonment.

=== Final years ===
Between 1575 and 1594 Jacqueline was once again officially dowager countess of Montbel d'Entremont and resumed her life at the court in Turin. She took part in all the festivities and intrigues and gave birth to an illegitimate daughter in great secrecy in February 1578 - she was christened Marguerite after Margaret, the late duchess of Savoy. The father was the Duke of Savoy and the child was adopted by Cassandre, countess of None and sister of André Provana de Leyni. The secret was so well guarded that it was only discovered in the 19th century - in 1870 the historian Victor de Saint-Genis argued that against its historicity, but fourteen years later this was proven by Gaudenzio Claretta, a historian from Turin.

The Duke died on 30 August 1580 and his son and successor Charles Emmanuel I redressed many issues with the neighbouring nations of France and Geneva. Intrigues continued at the ducal court in Turin and Jacqueline was strongly suspected of secretly negotiating with Henry IV of France after his conversion to Catholicism and his coronation at Chartres on 27 February 1594. The Holy Office had been kept informed of Jacqueline's affair and when Marguerite was suspected of being possessed by a demon it accused Jacqueline of witchcraft. Cardinal d'Ossat defended her, but she was imprisoned in the Moncalieri fortress in Turin. She was cleared of sorcery but kept in prison on new charges of treason.

She was transferred to the prison at Ivrea on 17 April 1598. Henry IV sent a letter in her favour on 30 June 1598, instructing his ambassador Guillaume de Gadagne, lord of Bouthéon to "help my cousin the wife of the Admiral of Castillon, who is treated very strictly by her officers, for no other reason than for always being very helpful in assisting my affairs. She had been accused of sorcery and had been treated badly before, having been transported from the cruel prison of the Chateau de Montcallier to a crueler one, the Castle of Ivrea, where it is not lawful for her daughter to see her, write to her or receive news of her, and this only for having helped in my service without committing any felony against the said duke, as you will tell him, begging him, to have her delivered for my sake, and henceforth to live as a good neighbor and friend, as he wrote to me in a letter which the said Lullin presented to me."

She remained in prison until her death, 17 December 1599, while imprisoned in the castle at Ivrea. According to Ossat she seems to have received the Catholic last rites, though her place of burial is unknown. Only thirteen years later, in 1601, Charles Emmanuel I was forced to cede Bresse, Bugey le Valromey and the country of Gex once and for all to Henry IV.

== Bibliography ==
- (in French) François Hotman, Vie de Messire Gaspard de Coligny, chez Barbin, Paris, 1665. (Édition originale: 1575).
- (in French) Victor de Saint-Genis, Études historiques sur la Savoie. Les femmes d'autrefois : Jacqueline de Montbel, Didier, Paris, 1869.
- (in French) Jules Delaborde, Gaspard de Coligny, amiral de France, Paris, Sandoz et Fisbacher, 1879-1882. 3 T.
- (in French) Jules Delaborde, Madame l'Amirale de Coligny après la Saint-Barthélémy, C. Maynels, 1867. 37 p.
- (in Italian) Gaudenzio Claretta, Giacomina d'Entremont, ammiraglia di Coligny ed Em. Filiberto duca di Savoia, Nuova Rivista, Vol.III et IV, Turin, 1882 - Una figlia di Giacomina d'Entremont, ammiraglia di Coligny, Nuova Rivista, Vol. I, série 2, Turin, 1884.
- (in Italian) Arturo Pascal, L'ammiraglia di Coligny, G. di Montbel, Turin, 1962.
- (in French) Claire Éliane Engel, L'Amiral de Coligny, Labor et Fides, Genève, 1967.
- (in French) Liliane Crété, Le protestantisme et les femmes. Aux origines de l'émancipation, Labor et Fides, Paris, 1985.
- (in French) Anne Weigel, Jacqueline de Montbel d'Entremont : une Savoyarde au temps des guerres de religion, Chambéry, Société savoisienne d'histoire et d'archéologie, 2008.
- (in French) Eugène Ritter, Recherches sur le poète Claude de Buttet et son Amalthée, Genève, Librairie H.Georg, 1887.
- Holt, Mack P. (2005). The French Wars of Religion, 1562-1629. Cambridge University Press.
