= Italian ship Andrea Provana =

Andrea Provana or simply Provana was the name of at least two ships of the Italian Navy named in honour of André Provana de Leyni and may refer to:

- Italian submarine Andrea Provana, a Barbarigo-class submarine launched in 1918 and discarded in 1928.
- Italian submarine Provana, a Marcello-class submarine launched in 1938 and sunk in 1940.
