= Zantzinger, Borie & Medary =

American architecture firm

- Industry: Architecture (civic and institutional)
- Founded: 1905 in Philadelphia, Pennsylvania, U.S.
- Defunct: 1950
- Fate: Zantzinger & Borie
- Headquarters: Philadelphia, Pennsylvania, United States
- Key people: Dominique Berninger, Charles Louis Borie Jr., Louis Kahn, Milton Bennett Medary, Clarence C. Zantzinger
- Products: Preliminary design work, Philadelphia Museum of Art

Zantzinger, Borie and Medary was an American architecture firm that operated from 1905 to 1950 in Philadelphia. It specialized in institutional and civic projects. For most of its existence, the partners were Clarence C. Zantzinger, Charles Louis Borie Jr., and Milton Bennett Medary, all Philadelphians.

The firm was a launching pad for numerous architects of note, including Dominique Berninger (1898–1949) and Louis Kahn (1901–1974).

== Zantzinger and Borie ==
The firm was established in 1905 as Zantzinger and Borie. Zantzinger and Borie were involved in years of preliminary design work on the Philadelphia Museum of Art. The 1911 commission was shared between Z&B and Horace Trumbauer. Most of the credit for the final building, completed in 1928, is given to architects Howell Lewis Shay and Julian Abele, both from Trumbauer's firm.

After Medary joined in 1910, the firm was renamed Zantzinger, Borie & Medary.

== Zantzinger, Borie & Medary ==
The firm collaborated with Paul Philippe Cret for the completed buildings listed below, and on proposals for the Nebraska State Capitol and the Liberty Memorial in Kansas City. When Medary died in 1929, the firm returned to its original name. Their work was part of the architecture event in the art competition at the 1928 Summer Olympics.

The firm was the first recorded American employer of French-born American architect Dominique Berninger, who worked there from 1925 to 1932. During this time he served as job captain for their design project of the Sheffield Scientific School at Yale University, New Haven, Connecticut, a project that cost around $1,250,000. Louis Kahn and Berninger had met while working at the firm and went on to form the Architectural Research Group (ARG) in Philadelphia, a short-lived collaborative society from 1932 to 1935 before Kahn took a job with the Philadelphia City Planning Commission, while Berninger commenced his own practice in 1933 and later formed the partnership of Berninger & Bower (fl.1935 – 1945), the predecessor firm of Haag & d'Entremont (fl.1946 – 1988).

The firm employed Edmund R. Purves as a draftsman from 1923 to 1927. The firm also worked with sculptor Lee Lawrie and iconographer Hartley Burr Alexander, both former collaborators with Bertram Goodhue.

The firm dissolved in 1950.

== Selected works ==
- 1905: West Philadelphia Branch, Free Library of Philadelphia, 40th & Walnut Streets, Philadelphia, Pennsylvania
- 1909: Henry Charles Lea Monument, Laurel Hill Cemetery, Philadelphia, Pennsylvania, Alexander Stirling Calder, sculptor.
- 1912: "Chanticleer" (Adolph Rosengarten Estate), Wayne, Pennsylvania. Now a public garden.
- 1916: Indianapolis Central Public Library, Indianapolis, with Paul Philippe Cret.
- 1917: Washington Memorial Chapel, Valley Forge National Historical Park, Valley Forge, Pennsylvania
- 1918: Federal Ordnance Plant Housing, Neville Island, Ohio River, Pennsylvania. The $50,000,000 commission was for 15,000 homes to house 20-25,000 workers.
- 1921-24: Henry Hall and Foulke Hall, Princeton University, Princeton, New Jersey.
- 1926-27: Fidelity Mutual Life Insurance Company Building, Philadelphia. Now part of the Philadelphia Museum of Art.
- 1927-28: Detroit Institute of Arts, Detroit, with Paul Philippe Cret.
- 1927-29: Bok Singing Tower, Lake Wales, Florida.
- 1929-31: Burton-Judson Courts, Hyde Park, Chicago.
- 1931: Strathcona Hall, Yale University, New Haven, Connecticut. This probably refers to the Sheffield Scientific School at Yale, a project that cost around $1,250,000, on which Berninger served as job captain.
- 1932-35: Department of Justice Building, Washington, D.C. (on which Kahn worked).

== See also ==
- List of Art Deco architecture

== Gallery ==
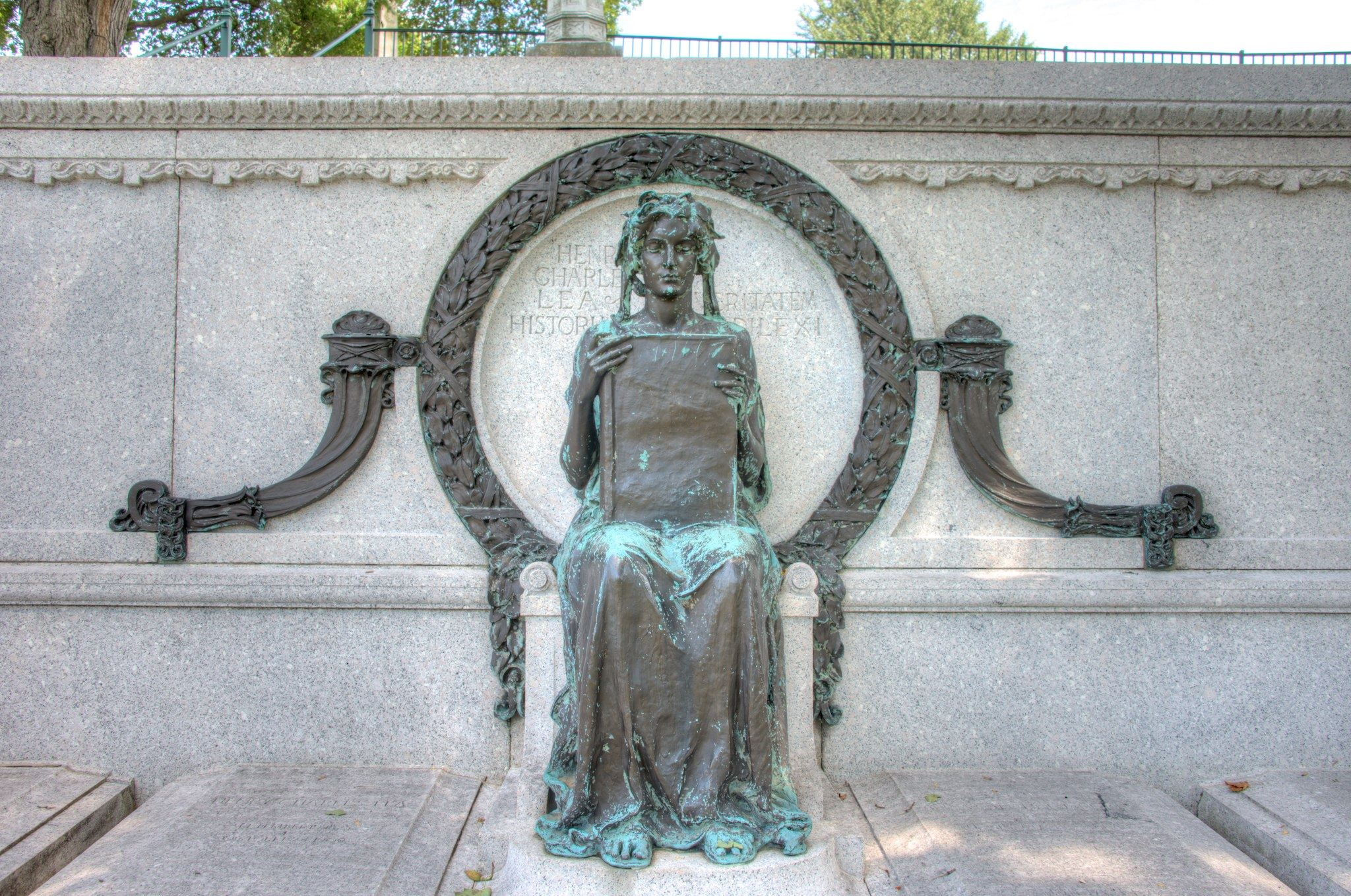
Lea Monument, Laurel Hill Cemetery, Philadelphia, Alexander Stirling Calder, sculptor (1909)

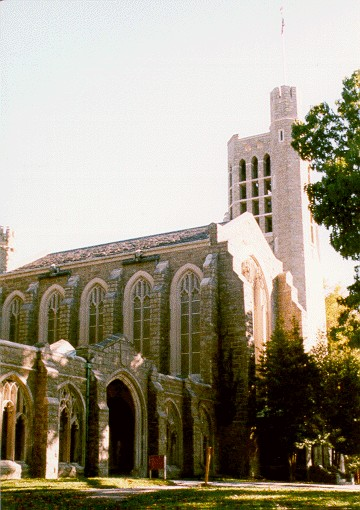
Washington Memorial Chapel, Valley Forge National Historical Park, Valley Forge, Pennsylvania (1917)

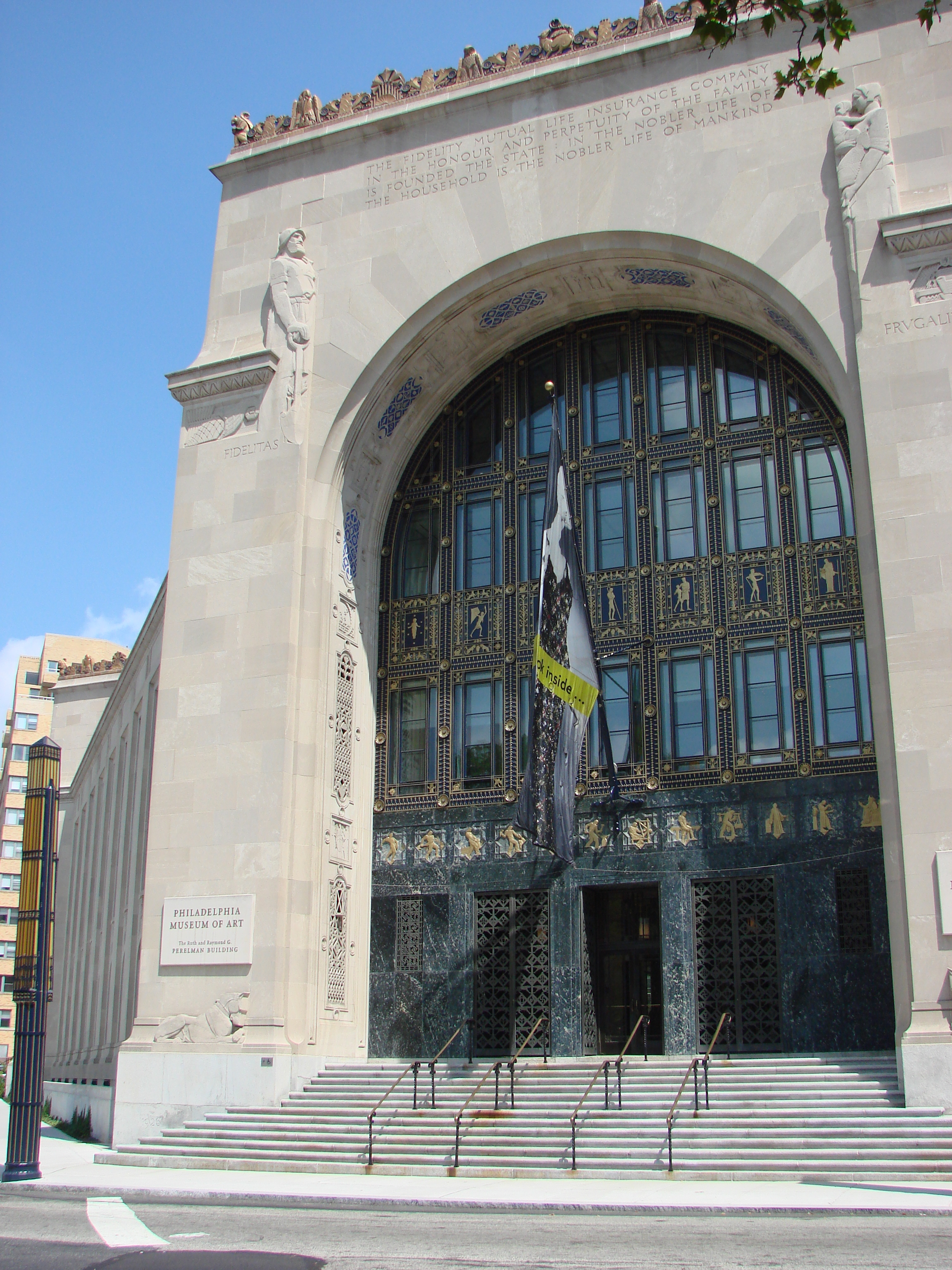
Fidelity Mutual Life Insurance Company Building, Philadelphia (1926–27). Now Ruth & Raymond G. Perelman Building, Philadelphia Museum of Art

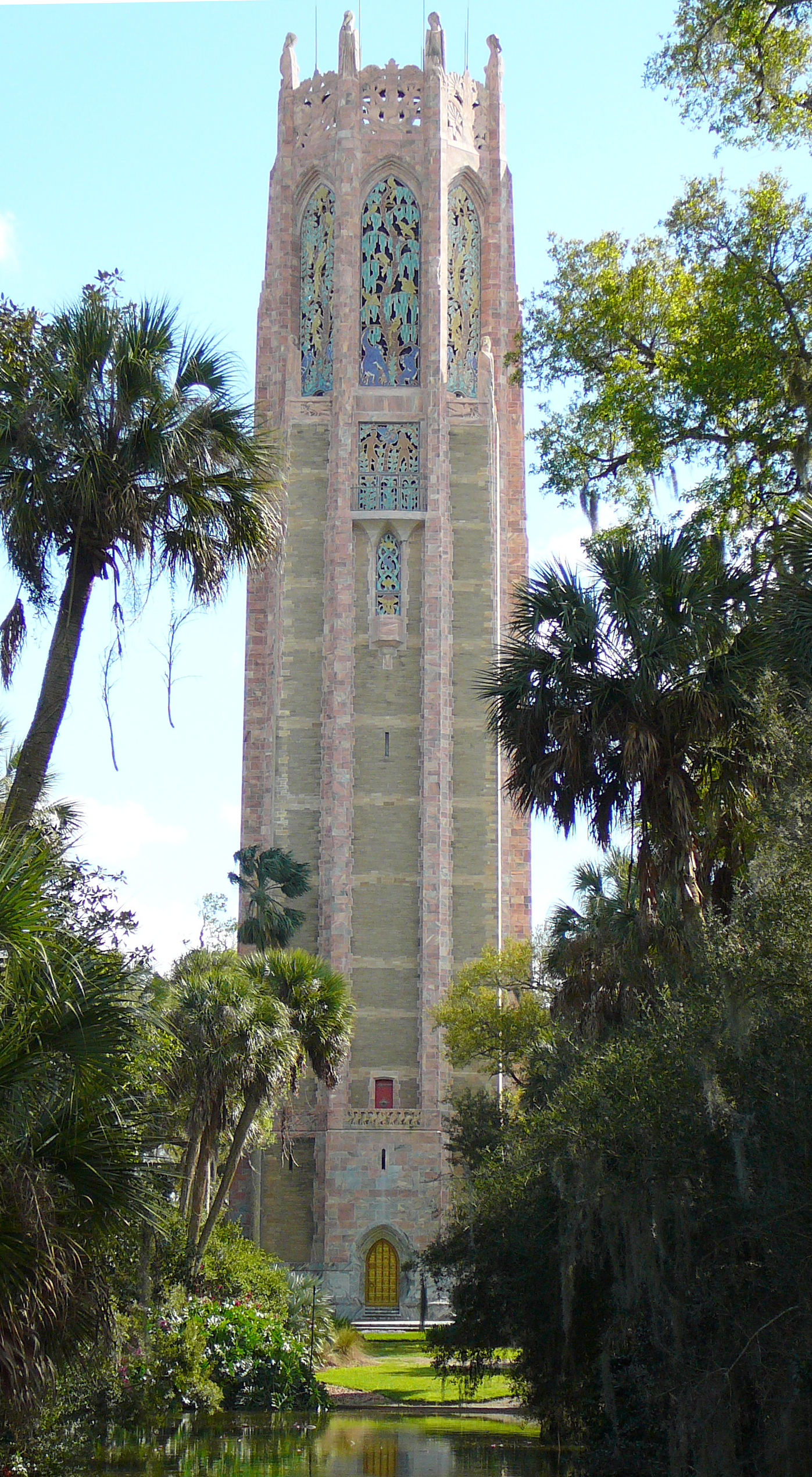
Bok Singing Tower, Lake Wales, Florida (1927–29)

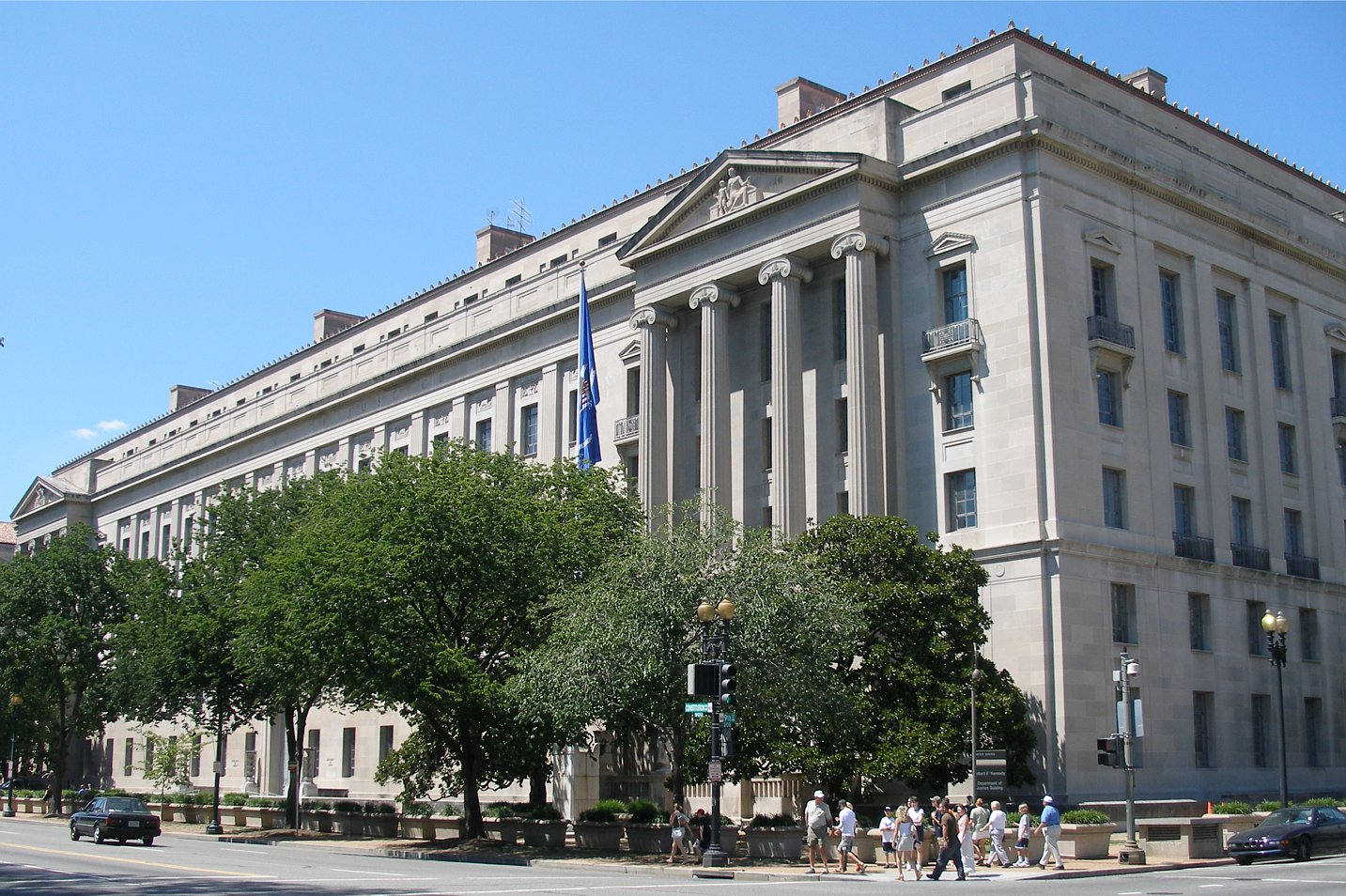
Robert F. Kennedy Department of Justice Building, Washington, D.C. (1932–35)
