= Perelman Building =

- Ruth and Raymond G. Perelman Building; Fidelity Mutual Life Insurance Company Building
- U.S. National Register of Historic Places
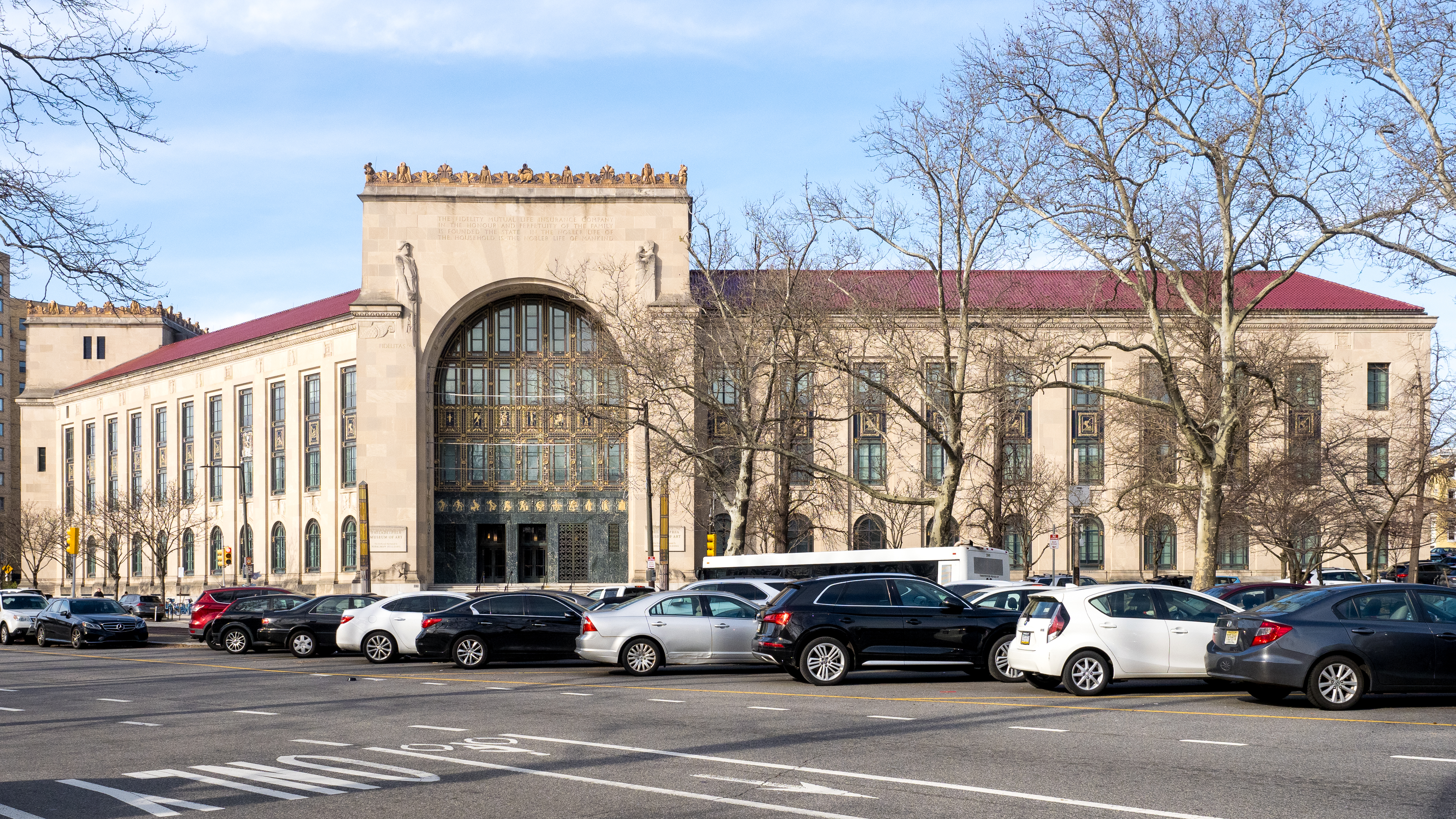

- Location within Philadelphia Location within Pennsylvania Location within the United States
- Location: Fairmount and Pennsylvania Aves., Philadelphia, Pennsylvania
- Coordinates: 39.967594°N 75.179395°W
- Built: 1926
- Architect: Zantzinger, Borie & Medary; Lee Lawrie (sculpture)
- Architectural style: Art Deco
- NRHP reference No.: 73001662
- Added to NRHP: July 2, 1973

The Ruth and Raymond G. Perelman Building—originally the Fidelity Mutual Life Insurance Company Building—is an annex of the Philadelphia Museum of Art containing exhibition galleries, offices, conservation labs, and the museum library. It is an Art Deco building that features cathedral-like entrances and is adorned with sculpture and gilding. The building is listed on the National Register of Historic Places. The Perelman Building is located at the intersection of Pennsylvania Avenue and Fairmount Avenue, facing the Philadelphia Museum of Art's main building across Kelly Drive.

== History ==
Philadelphia architectural firm Zantzinger, Borie & Medary, which had collaborated on the Philadelphia Museum of Art, designed the building to be the headquarters for Fidelity Mutual Life Insurance Company. Construction began in 1926 and the building was completed in 1928. Sculptor Lee Lawrie created its decorative scheme, which features polychrome facades adorned with figures symbolizing attributes of insurance: the owl of wisdom, the dog of fidelity, the pelican of charity, the opossum of protection, and the squirrel of frugality. Fidelity Mutual Life Insurance Company occupied the building from 1927 to 1972. In 1982, it was acquired and restored by the Reliance Standard Life Insurance Company, which in turn relocated in 1999.

=== Philadelphia Museum of Art restoration ===
The Philadelphia Museum of Art acquired the building in 1999 through the City of Philadelphia. In anticipation of its 125th anniversary in 2001, the museum began a capital campaign that collected $240 million in donations. In recognition of the $15 million contributed by the Perelmans, the annex was renamed the Ruth and Raymond G. Perelman Building in 2000. Gluckman Mayner Architects restored and renovated the historic building, and expanded it with a 59,000-square-foot (5,500 m^{2}) addition. The Perelman Building opened on September 15, 2007.

== Resources ==
The Perelman Building's six galleries total 2,000 square feet (190 m^{2}) of exhibition space.

- The Julien Levy Gallery is dedicated to photographs from the museum's collection of over 150,000 prints, drawings, and photographs.
- The Joan Spain Gallery is dedicated to exhibition of the museum's costume and textiles collection, which has over 30,000 works.
- The Collab Gallery shows modern and contemporary design art ranging from furniture to ceramics.
- The Exhibition Gallery hosts changing special exhibitions.
- Two study galleries provide resources to art scholars, and are available to the public by appointment and an educational resource center for teachers.
- The museum's library holds collections of art books and periodicals on the first floor and a reading room on the second floor.
