= Architectural Research Group =

The Architectural Research Group (ARG) was an association of mostly young architects in Philadelphia, Pennsylvania, established in 1932 by Louis Kahn and Dominique Berninger "for the group study of Housing and Slum Clearance." Berninger acted as its president during the whole of the group's brief existence, 1932 to 1935. Until 1932, both founders were employed by the Philadelphia firm of Zantzinger, Borie & Medary, with Kahn working on their U.S. Department of Justice Building in Washington, D.C.

Its members were interested in the ideas of the European avantgarde and a populist social agenda. Uncommissioned, most of the ARG's significant project output was left unbuilt, including Kahn's public housing scheme submitted to the Public Works Administration. However, Kahn soon took a job with the Philadelphia City Planning Commission, while Berninger continued his practice with Carswell, Berninger & Bower.
