= Burton–Judson Courts =

Burton-Judson Courts
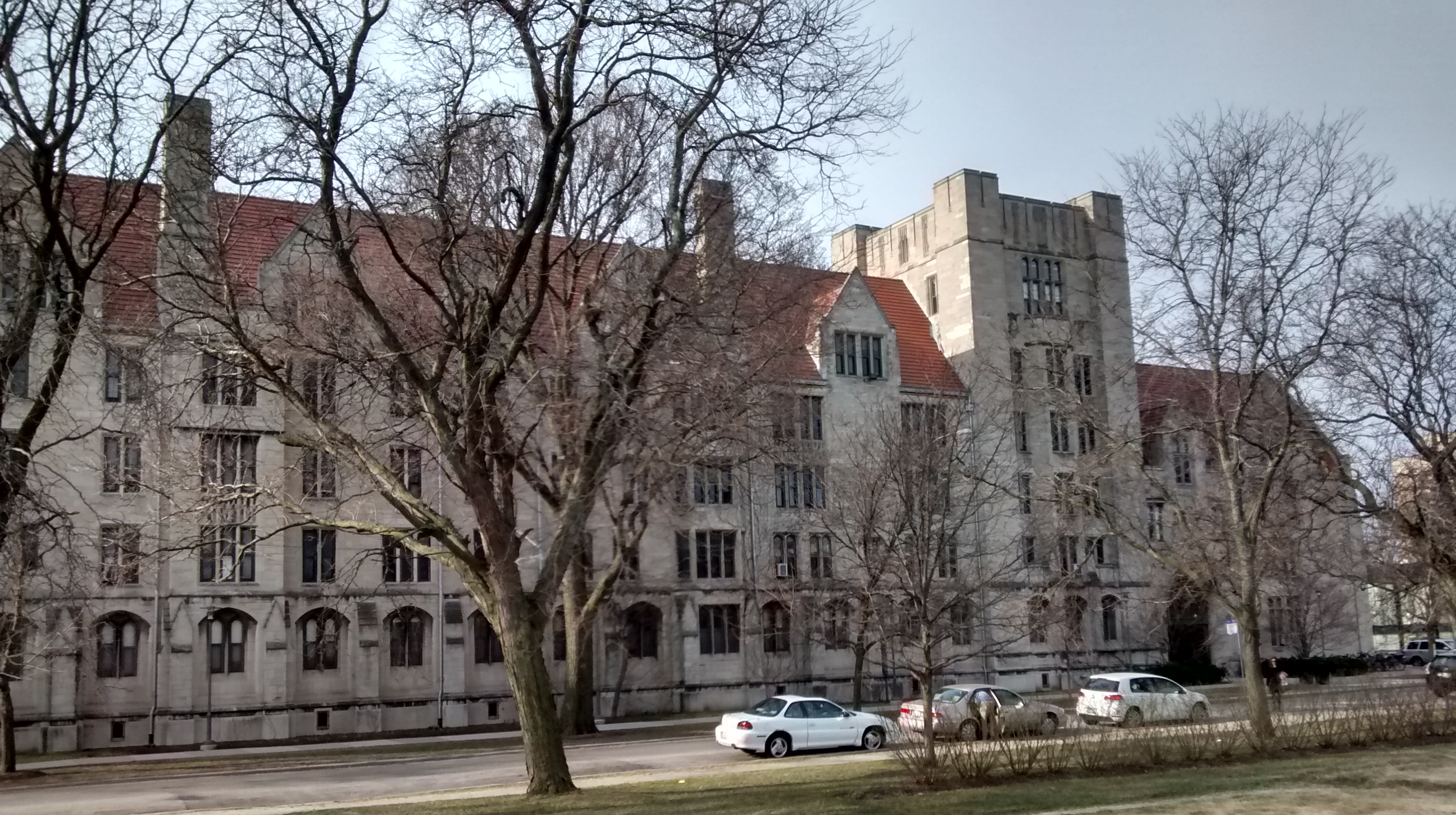
- Interactive map of the Burton-Judson Courts area

General information
- Type: Dormitory
- Location: 1005 E. 60th Street; Chicago, Illinois 60637; United States
- Coordinates: 41°47′09″N 87°36′03″W
- Construction started: 1930
- Completed: 1931

Design and construction
- Architect: Zantzinger, Borie & Medary

Website
- official website

Burton–Judson Courts (BJ) is a dormitory located on the University of Chicago campus. The neo-Gothic style structure was designed by the Philadelphia architectural firm of Zantzinger, Borie & Medary, and was completed in 1931 at a cost of $1,756,287.

Burton–Judson Courts is built around two courtyards that are named after the university's second and third presidents, Harry Pratt Judson and Ernest DeWitt Burton. Burton-Judson contains six houses: Chamberlin, Coulter, Dodd-Mead, Linn-Mathews, Salisbury, and Vincent. In addition to student rooms, the building contains a library, lounge rooms, and apartments for resident heads and the resident deans.

== Notable residents ==
- Otis Brawley, oncologist and executive vice president of the American Cancer Society.
- Misha Collins, actor.
- James W. Cronin, Ok Nobel Prize–winning physicist and University of Chicago faculty member. Lived in Vincent House (room 415).
- Philip Glass, Noted composer, lived in Coulter House.
- Tucker Max, Noted blogger and "fratire" writer. Lived in Mathews House.
- Walter Oi, academic and US government economist.
- Ken Ono, mathematician. Lived in Dodd-Mead House.
- Santa J. Ono, Immunologist, 15th President of University of Michigan and 28th President of University of Cincinnati, 15th President of University of British Columbia. Lived in Dodd-Mead House (room 141a).
- Richard Rorty, American Pragmatist.
- Carl Sagan, Noted astronomer. Lived in Dodd House (room 141).
- Bernie Sanders, United States Senator from Vermont. Lived in Chamberlin House.
- Thomas Sebeok, semiotician and linguist.
- Evan Sharp, Co-founder and designer of Pinterest. Lived in Salisbury House.
- George Steiner, Literary and cultural critic.
- Nate Silver, Statistician and editor-in-chief of FiveThirtyEight. Lived in Vincent House.
- Morgan Saylor, Actress. Lived in Dodd-Mead House.
- Agnes Callard, Philosopher. Lived in Dodd-Mead House.

== See also ==
- Housing at the University of Chicago
