= D'Autremont =

D'Autremont (or d'Autremont) is a surname. Notable people with the surname include:

- Charles d'Autremont (1855–1919), American mayor
- Dan D'Autremont (born 1950), Canadian politician in Saskatchewan
- Jeanne D'Autremont (1899–1979), French chess player

== See also ==
- D'Entremont (surname)
