= Gluckman Tang Architects =

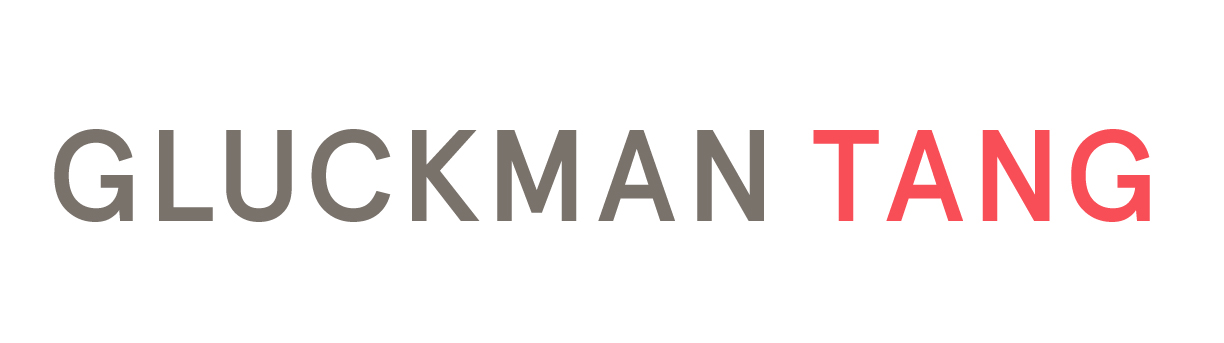

Practice information
- Founded: 1977
- Location: New York, NY

Website
- gluckmantang.com

Gluckman Tang Architects, (previously Gluckman Mayner Architects), is a New York City–based architecture firm providing services in architecture, planning, and interior design. Established by Richard Gluckman in 1977, the firm focuses on a minimalist design approach.

== Leadership ==
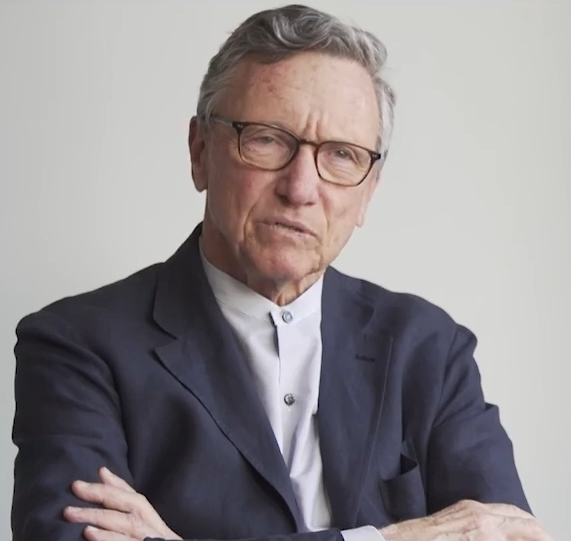
Richard Gluckman in 2018

Gluckman received his bachelor of architecture and master of architecture from Syracuse University. Described as a “maker of precisely silent frames”, Gluckman's involvement with New York minimalist architecture began in the late 1970s with installing an art installation in the Upper East Side residence for Heiner Friedrich and Philippa de Menil, founders of the Dia Art Foundation. His reputation as the “artists’ architect” grew with the renovation of a reinforced concrete warehouse into Dia Center for the Arts, and design of spaces in Chelsea for gallerists. In 2003, Gluckman served as an architectural adviser to the New Museum building.

Dana Tang became a partner in 2015 after 20 years spent with the firm.

== Recognition ==
Two monographs of the firm's work have been published by The Monacelli Press: Framework: Gluckman Mayner Architects (2009) and Space Framed: Richard Gluckman Architect (2000).

Gluckman Tang Architects has received a number of awards from the American Institute of Architects, including a Small Projects Award, and an Honor Award for Architecture.

In 2005, Richard Gluckman was presented with a National Design Award from the Cooper-Hewitt, National Design Museum. He was also inducted into the Interior Design Hall of Fame in 1999.

== Selected projects ==
- Staten Island Museum (2015) – New York, NY
- Cooper-Hewitt, National Design Museum (2014) – New York, NY
- Syracuse University College of Law, Dineen Hall (2014) – Syracuse, NY
- Museum of Contemporary Art San Diego (2007) – San Diego, CA
- Philadelphia Museum of Art – Ruth and Raymond G. Perelman Building (2007) – Philadelphia, PA
- Museo Picasso Málaga (2004) – Málaga, Spain
- The Mori Arts Center, including The Mori Art Museum (2003) – Tokyo, Japan
- Georgia O'Keeffe Museum (1997) – Santa Fe, NM
- Andy Warhol Museum (1994) – Pittsburgh, PA
- Dia Center for the Arts (1987) – New York, NY
