= Edmund R. Purves =

American architect (1897–1964)

Edmund Purves
- Born: Edmund Randolph Purves; June 20, 1897; Philadelphia, Pennsylvania, US
- Died: April 8, 1964 (aged 66); Washington, D.C., US
- Education: University of Pennsylvania
- Occupation: Architect
- Awards: Kemper Award, American Institute of Architects; F. Stuart Patrick Memorial Award, Building Research Institute
- Practice: Edmund R. Purves; Purves, Cope & Stewart; Purves & Day; Zantzinger, Borie & Medary; Willing, Sims & Talbutt
- Projects: Executive Director, American Institute of Architects

Edmund Randolph Purves FAIA (June 20, 1897 – April 8, 1964) was an American architect and executive director of the American Institute of Architects. He was also a highly decorated soldier in World War I, serving in both the American Field Service and the American Expeditionary Forces.

== Early life and military service ==
Purves was born in Philadelphia, Pennsylvania. He was the son of Betsey P. C. (née Coleman) and Austin M. Purves, a financier and art patron associated with the Pennsylvania Salt Manufacturing Company. He traveled in Europe with his parents for four months when he was thirteen. Starting in 1907, he attended the Germantown Friends School, graduating in 1914.

He attended the University of Pennsylvania where he studied architecture and was a member of the Fraternity of Delta Psi (St. Anthony Hall) and the Art Alliance. He stopped his studies for World War I, serving as an ambulance driver with the American Field Service in France, April through August 1917. From September 1917 – 1919, he served as a corporal and, then, 2nd lieutenant, in the American Expeditionary Forces, engaging in six major battles. He earned the American Field Service Medal, the Croix de Guerre with a Silver Star, the Verdun Medal (a.k.a. Medaille de Verdun), and the Victory Medal with four battle clasps.

After the war, he returned to the University of Pennsylvania, receiving a B.S. in architecture in 1920. In 1919 and 1920, Purves received several medals from the Beaux-Art Institute of Design in New York City. He was a finalist for the Paris Prize design contest in 1920. From 1920 to 1921, he studied at Atelier Gromont, the studio of Georges Gromort, in France.

In early 1942, he again volunteered for military service in the U.S. Army. This time, he joined the Seventh Air Force in the Pacific. He was also a chief counter-intelligence officer in the Pacific Theater.

== Career ==
Purves started practicing architecture in Philadelphia in 1923. He initially joined the firm of Zantzinger, Borie & Medary as a draftsman. In 1925, he worked for Willing, Sims & Talbutt, but returned to Zantzinger, Borie & Medary for 1926-1927. From 1923 to 1925, he also taught evening classes in architectural design at the School of Industrial of Art at the Pennsylvania Museum (now the Philadelphia Museum of Art); he was an assistant demonstrator of design from 1927 to 1928.

In 1927, he co-founded Purves & Day architectural firm in Philadelphia, Pennsylvania with Kenneth MacKenzie Day. Day was also a recent graduate of the University of Pennsylvania and was the son of Frank Miles Day, one of Philadelphia's most prestigious architects. Purves & Day focused on residential architecture. In 1937, they dissolved the firm, and Purves practiced independently from 1932 to 1937.

From 1937 to 1941, he was a member of the firm Purves, Cope & Stewart along with Thomas Pym Cope and Harry Gordan Stewart. Steward and Cope were both also graduates of the University of Pennsylvania. Cope was the son of Walter Cope, a successful Philadelphia architect. The firm specialized in residential architecture, but did take on larger projects such as libraries and The Dunes Club. The firm dissolved when all three members entered World War II.

On December 6, 1941, Purves accepted a staff position with the American Institute of Architects (AIA) and worked out of The Octagon House in Washington, D.C. His initial tasks were to create a nationwide program to aid defense and an emergency program for the architectural profession in collaboration with the 71 chapters. However, he almost immediately took a leave of absence to serve in World War II. He returned from the war in 1945 and became AIA's director of public and professional relations in 1946. Purves saw the importance of marketing and public relations for architects and made it part of his platform for the duration of his time with AIA. In 1962, he said, "We are not quite in the same position as the doctor and lawyer whose services are in constant and automatic demand. The architect must still seek continually the engagement of his services and make a case for good design."

In 1949, he became AIA's executive director, replacing Edward C. Kemper who retired. Some of the projects and issues AIA undertook while Purves was there included helping the War Production Board conserve building materials during World War II, developing Atomic Age architecture that would withstand nuclear bombs, designing architecture that could provide protection from airborne plagues or toxins, and solving the post-war housing and school shortage. He also addressed the government's plan to demolish historic houses near Lafayette Square in Washington, D.C. to make way for new government buildings, saying, "We are more concerned about how it will be done than if it will be done. It is essential, of course, to save Decatur and Blair House."

One amusing incident occurred after it was learned that the White House had structural problems, including two-story tall cracks in the brickwork and split support beams, and this tells a lot about Purves' ability to get to the point. "One afternoon, as the group pondered its limited options around the big table in Truman's Cabinet Room, Edmund Purves, the American Institute of Architect's public affairs man, turned to [W .E.] Reynolds with a question. 'I asked him if he, as the Commissioner of Public Buildings, would certify the White House as safe for public occupancy.' Reynolds sputtered no, of course he would not. Purves then reminded the Commissioner—reminded the whole group, in fact—that 'we had the president of the United States living in it.' A silence fell over the room."

Purves retired from AIA in 1960 but served as a consulting director for another year. Under Purves' leadership, AIA strengthen its relationship with the Federal government and grew its membership to 11,000.

In 1961, he was an associate of the architectural and engineering firm of Chatelain, Gauger & Nolan, working there until his death.

== Selected projects ==
Project	Client	Location	Date	Architect	Notes
Touchstone	restaurant and ballroom	Philadelphia, Pennsylvania	1928	Purves & Day	
Residence	Roy Stewart	2 East Sunset Avenue, Philadelphia, Pennsylvania (Chestnut Hill Historic District)	1928	Purves & Day	
Residence	John S. Wright	505 West Chestnut Hill Avenue, Philadelphia, Pennsylvania (Chestnut Hill Historic District)	1928	Purves & Day	
Residence	John S. Wright	8820 Towanda Street, Philadelphia, Pennsylvania	1928	Purves & Day	
St. Paul Episcopal Church (renovations)		22 Chestnut Hill Avenue, Philadelphia, Pennsylvania (Chestnut Hill Historic District)		Purves & Day	
Residence		Chestnut Hill, Pennsylvania	1929	Purves	
The Lilacs (alterations)		Greenland Drive, Philadelphia, Pennsylvania (Philadelphia Register of Historic Places, Fairmount Park Historic District)		Purves	
Residence		Paoli, Pennsylvania	1930	Purves	
office building	Charles T. Fritz & William A. Ryan	Camden, New Jersey	1932	Purves	
Residence (alterations)	William S. Ellis	Bryn Mawr, Pennsylvania	1933	Purves	
Residence (alternations)	C. Paul Denckla	Edgemont, Pennsylvania	1934	Purves	
Residence		Edgemont, Pennsylvania	1935	Purves	
Houses (40 units)	Forest Hills Gardens Corp.	Camden, New Jersey	1935	Purves; Green & MacNelley	
Cottage for Children's Convalescent Home	Junior League of Harrisburg	Harrisburg, Pennsylvania	1937	Purves	
Residence		Unionville, Pennsylvania	1939	Purves	
Monument		Philadelphia, Pennsylvania	1940	Purves	
Philadelphia Showroom	Kohler Company	Philadelphia, Pennsylvania	1940	Purves	
The Dunes Club		Narragansett, Rhode Island (National Register of Historic Places)	1940	Purves, Cope & Stewart	
Boxwood Estates Development Plans	George McFadden Estate	Villanova, Pennsylvania	1940	Purves	

== Publications ==
- "The Limestone Columns." Bulletin of the Pennsylvania Museum. 19, no. 19 (1923): 29-35.
- "Our Profession—Its Place in America's Future, Part I." Journal of American Institute of Architects 24 (December 1955): 267-273
- "Our Profession, Its Place in America's Future, Part II." Journal of American Institute of Architects 25 (January 1956): 24-39.
- "The Architect and the Superman Myth." Architectural Forum (March 1962): 102-105.
- "Sketches by Edmund Randolph Purves FAIA." AIA Journal 43, no. 4 (April 1963): 38-42.

== Professional affiliations ==
Purves became a member of the American Institute of Architects (AIA) in 1930. He was elected secretary and later 1st vice president of the Philadelphia Chapter of AIA, and served on the national AIA Board from 1938 to 1941. In 1938, he was nominated to serve as regional director for AIA's Mid-Atlantic Region which included Delaware, Maryland, New Jersey, Pennsylvania, West Virginia, and Washington D.C. In that capacity, he was a guest speaker at the New York Chapter of AIA in September 1940. He also represented AIA in an article in The New York Times about potential military contracts for architects in October 1940. He later joined the Washington D.C. Chapter of AIA. Purves was elected a AIA Fellow in 1944.

In 1934, he was secretary of the University of Pennsylvania's Architectural Alumni Association. From 1936 to 1938, he was president of the Pennsylvania Association of Architects. In 1940, he was appointed by the governor to the Pennsylvania State Board of Examiners for Architects, a position he retained until 1950. He also was a United States delegate to the International Union of Architects and was elected an honorary member of both the Royal Architectural Institute of Canada and Royal Institute of British Architects.

He was a member the Committee of the President's People Program and the Committee on Economic Policy for the United States Chamber of Commerce. He also served on the United States Atomic Energy Commission's advisory board on contract appeals and the United States General Works Administration's Public Works Advisory Committee.

== Honors ==
- Kemper Award from the American Institute of Architects
- Gold Metal from the Philadelphia Chapter of the American Institute of Architects
- Special Citation from the American Institute of Architects
- F. Stuart Patrick Memorial Award from the Building Research Institute in 1961
- Citation from the Housing and Home Finance Agency and United States Atomic Energy Commission
- The Edmund Randolph Purves papers are housed at the Library of Congress
- The Edmund R. Purves Memorial Lecture is hosted annually by the American Institute of Architects as "the intellectual high point" of the AIA year

== Personal ==
He married Mary Carroll Spencer of Haverford, Pennsylvania on December 11, 1926. They had two sons, Edmund Spencer Purves and Alan Carroll Purves. After getting married, they lived at Kennerly Farm in Media, Pennsylvania. After he took the position with AIA, they lived at 1524 30th Street N.W. in Washington, D.C.

He was a member of the Century Association, the Cosmos Club, the Philadelphia Club, the Rotary Club, the Literary Club of Washington, D.C., and the St. Anthony Club of New York. He served on the boards of the Pennsylvania Institute for the Instruction of the Blind from 1935-1943 and the Northwest Settlement House in Washington, D.C. He was the Philadelphia chairman of the American Field Service. He also attended St. John's Church in Georgetown.

In 1964, he died at Washington Hospital Center in Washington, D.C. at the age of 66 after a long illness.
