= Gei Zantzinger =

American documentary filmmaker

- Born: Alfred Geist Zantzinger; April 6, 1936
- Died: February 16, 2007; Philadelphia, Pennsylvania
- Occupation: American documentary filmmaker

Alfred Geist Zantzinger (April 6, 1936 – February 16, 2007) was an American documentary filmmaker specializing in documentaries about traditional musics of the world. He directed and produced films about the musics of Mozambique, Zimbabwe, Cape Verde, Lesotho, South Africa, and Brittany.

He was the grandson of noted Philadelphia architect Clarence C. Zantzinger.

He graduated from Westminster School in Connecticut and earned bachelor's and master's degrees in folklore and anthropology from the University of Pennsylvania.

Zantzinger began making films in southern Africa in 1966, while a Ph.D. candidate in the folklore/folklife program at the University of Pennsylvania. He studied film with Sol Worth at the University of Pennsylvania's Annenberg School of Communications.

Zantzinger also worked as a record producer. He lived in Devault, Chester County, Pennsylvania, where his production company, Constant Spring Productions, was based.

He died of leukemia on February 16, 2007, at the Hospital of the University of Pennsylvania. His memorial service was held at the University of Pennsylvania Museum at 6 p.m. on April 6, 2007.

== Filmography (includes country filmed in) ==
- 1971 - KUR
- 1973 - MADA (Mozambique)
- 1973 - DEIVIS QDE LAINA (Mozambique)
- 1973 - ONE PIECE 4EVA
- 1974 - Ola Belle Reed: Memories
- 1978 - Urban and Rural Ceremonies (Zimbabwe)
- 1978 - Matepe dza Mhondoro: A Musical Healing Party (Zimbabwe)
- 1978 - Dambatsoko: An Old Cult Center (Zimbabwe)
- 1978 - Karanga Songs in Christian Ceremonies (Zimbabwe)
- 1978 - The Technique of the Mbira dza Vadzimu (Zimbabwe)
- 1978 - Religion at the Family Level (Zimbabwe)
- 1980 - The Chopi Timbila Dance (Mozambique)
- 1980 - Ndando Yawusiwana
- 1981 - Audrey Bronson
- 1984 - Songs of the Badius (Cape Verde)
- 1985 - Songs of the Adventurers (Lesotho)
- 1990 - SUSUMU - A Tone Poem in Three Movements
- 1994 - A Spirit Here Today: A Scrapbook of Chopi Village Music (Mozambique; filmed in 1973 but not edited until 1994)
- 1999 - Of Pipers & Wrens/De Souffle et de Roseau (Brittany)
