= Association for Public Art =

US nonprofit public art organization

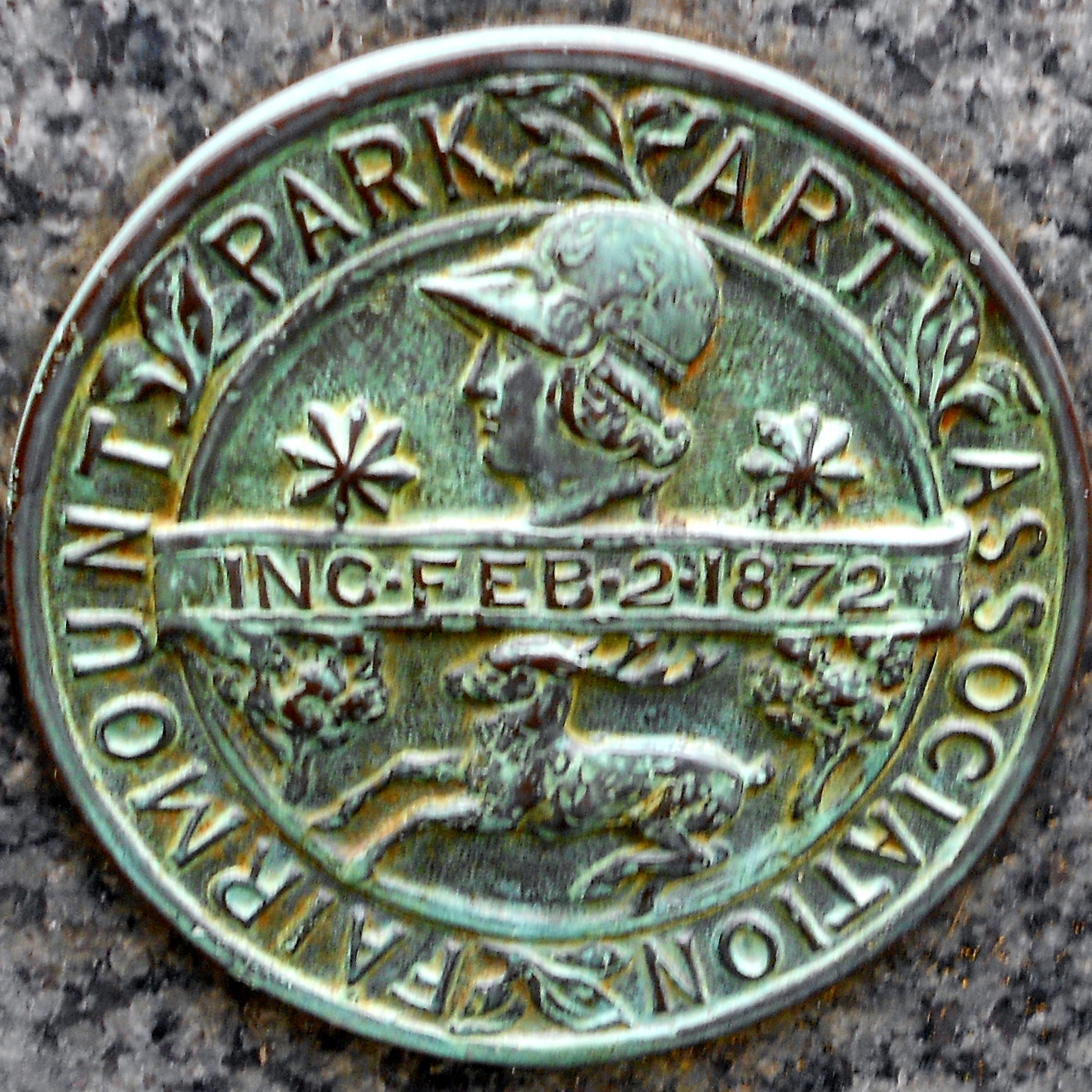
- Medallion on the back of statue of "Puma"
- Abbreviation: aPA
- Formation: 1872
- Purpose: Commission, preserve, promote, and interpret public art in Philadelphia
- Headquarters: 1528 Walnut Street, Suite 1000, Philadelphia, Pennsylvania 19102, U.S.
- Region served: Philadelphia, Pennsylvania, U.S.
- Website: http://www.associationforpublicart.org/
- Formerly called: Fairmount Park Art Association

The Association for Public Art (aPA), founded as the Fairmount Park Art Association, is the first private, nonprofit public art organization dedicated to integrating public art and urban planning in the United States. Established in 1872 in Philadelphia, the association commissions, preserves, promotes, and interprets public art in the city, which is a noted center of public art.

The aPA has acquired and commissioned works by many notable sculptors, including Augustus Saint-Gaudens, Alexander Stirling Calder, Daniel Chester French, Frederic Remington, Paul Manship, and Albert Laessle. It has supported city planning projects, established an outdoor sculpture conservation program, and sponsored numerous publications, exhibitions, and educational programs. The aPA interprets and preserves more than 200 works of art throughout Philadelphia, working with the city's Public Art Office, Fairmount Park, and other organizations and agencies to placing and caring for outdoor sculpture in Philadelphia. It maintains an inventory of the city's public art.

== History ==
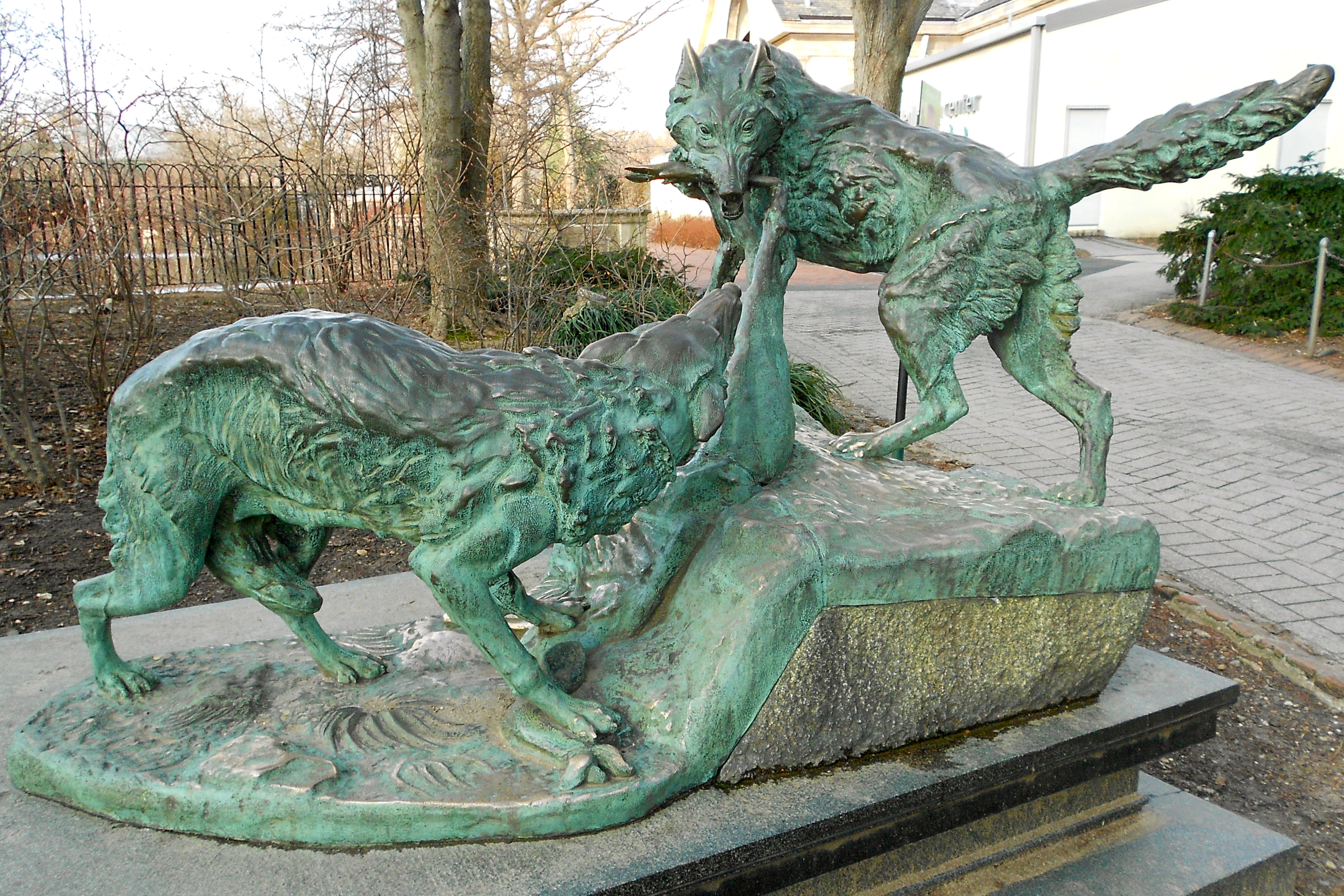
Hudson Bay Wolves by Edward Kemeys

=== 19th century ===
The Fairmount Park Art Association was founded by friends Charles H. Howell and Henry K. Fox, who led a group of citizens who wanted to counter the city's encroaching industrialism by beautifying Philadelphia with public art.

Chartered by the Commonwealth of Pennsylvania in 1872, the association initially focused on adding outdoor sculpture to Fairmount Park. Under its first president, financier Anthony J. Drexel, the association's first official venture was purchasing Hudson Bay Wolves Quarreling Over the Carcass of a Deer (1872) by Edward Kemeys. Its first major undertaking was commissioning Alexander Milne Calder for an equestrian statue of Major General George Meade in 1873.

=== 20th century ===
In 1906, the association expanded its purview beyond the park to "promote and foster the beautiful in Philadelphia, in its architecture, improvements, and the city plan."

From 1969 to 1980, the FPAA was led by architect Clarence Clark Zantzinger Jr. In 1974, the organization published Sculpture of a City: Philadelphia's Treasures in Bronze and Stone, a book about the city's public sculpture.

=== 21st century ===
In May 2012, the Fairmount Park Art Association changed its name to the Association for Public Art (aPA). The change was made to more clearly communicate the nature and scope of the organization's work, and to distinguish itself from other local and national public art agencies. The organization's first major project under its new name was Open Air (2012), a world-premiere interactive light installation for the Benjamin Franklin Parkway by Rafael Lozano-Hemmer.

== Public art ==
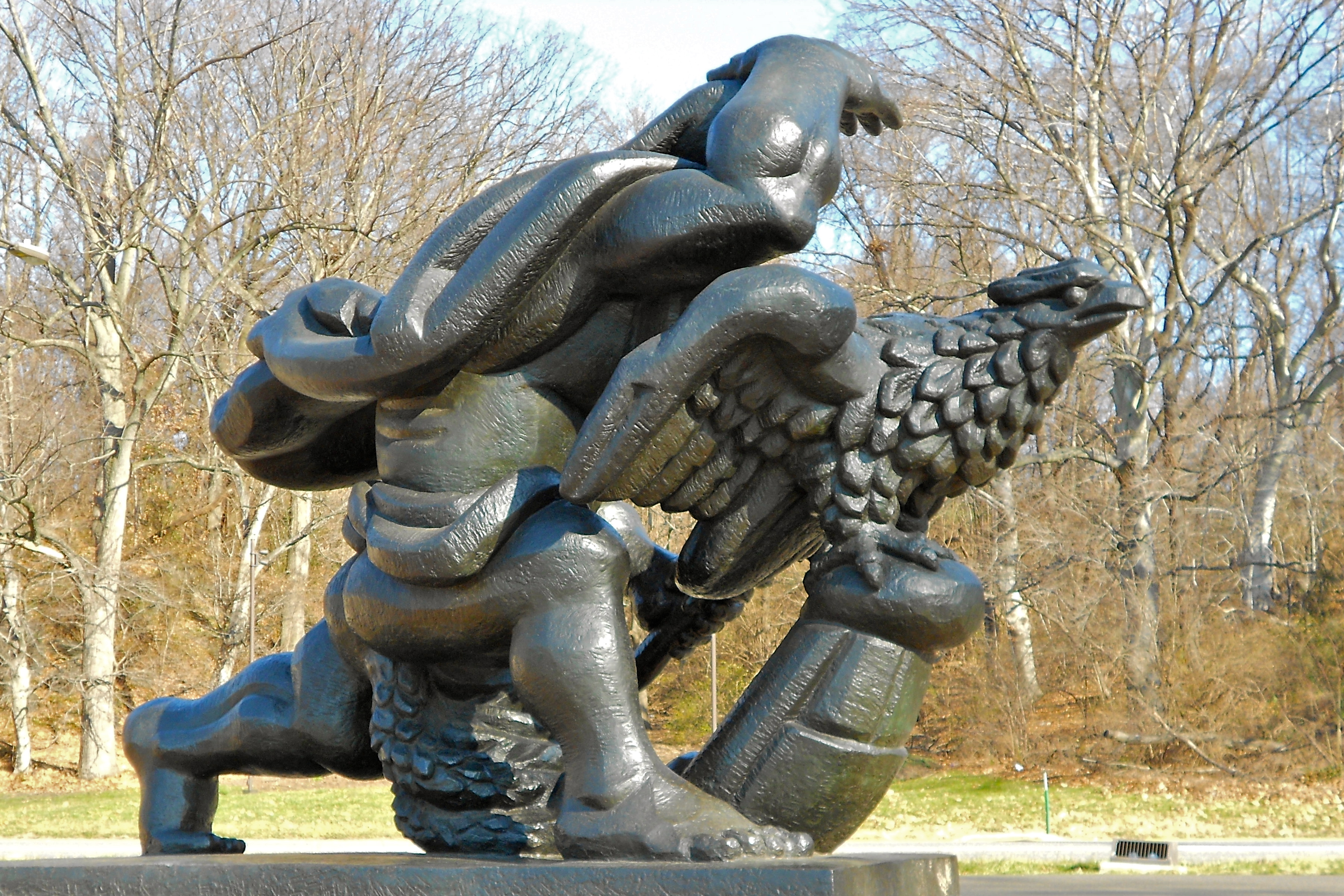
The Spirit of Enterprise (1950–1960) by Jacques Lipchitz

- Steel Bodies (2022), Maren Hassinger - originally commissioned and presented by Socrates Sculpture Park in New York and coming to Philadelphia June 12 - November 12, 2023.
- Maja (1942, reinstalled 2021), Gerhard Marcks, purchased by the Association for Public Art
- Winter Fountains (2017), Jennifer Steinkamp, presented by the Parkway Council and commissioned by the Association for Public Art
- Cai Guo-Qiang: Fireflies (2017), Cai Guo-Qiang, commissioned by the Association for Public Art with Fung Collaboratives
- Big Bling (2016; installed 2017), Martin Puryear, presented by the Association for Public Art, commissioned by Madison Square Park Conservancy
- AMOR (1998; installed 2015), Robert Indiana, presented by the Association for Public Art and the Philadelphia Museum of Art
- Magic Carpet (2014), Candy Coated (formerly Candy Depew), commissioned by the Association for Public Art
- Symbiosis (2011; installed 2014), Roxy Paine, acquired through a grant from the Daniel W. Dietrich II Trust, Inc.
- OPEN AIR (2012), Rafael Lozano-Hemmer, commissioned by the Association for Public Art
- Rock Form (Porthcurno) (1964; installed 2012), Barbara Hepworth, gift of David N. Pincus to the Association for Public Art, commissioned by the Philadelphia Redevelopment Authority
- The Labor Monument: Philadelphia's Tribute to the American Worker (2010), John Kindness, commissioned by the Association for Public Art
- Common Ground (2009), John Stone and Lonnie Graham in collaboration with Lorene Cary for Project HOME, commissioned by the Association for Public Art
- Iroquois (1983–1999; installed 2007), Mark di Suvero, acquired by the Association for Public Art, gift of David N. Pincus
- Manayunk Stoops: Heart and Home (2006), Diane Pieri, commissioned by the Association for Public Art
- Embodying Thoreau: Dwelling, Sitting, Watching (2003), Ed Levine, commissioned by the Association for Public Art
- I have a story to tell you…(2003), Pepón Osorio, commissioned by the Association for Public Art
- Pavilion in the Trees (1993), Martin Puryear, commissioned by the Association for Public Art
- Sleeping Woman (1991), Tom Chimes and Stephen Berg, commissioned by the Association for Public Art
- Fingerspan (1987), Jody Pinto, commissioned by the Association for Public Art
- Bolt of Lightning...A Memorial to Benjamin Franklin (conceived 1933; installed 1984), Isamu Noguchi, commissioned by the Association for Public Art
- Louis Kahn Lecture Room (1982), Siah Armajani, commissioned by the Association for Public Art
- El Gran Teatro de la Luna (1982), Rafael Ferrer, commissioned by the Association for Public Art
- Atmosphere and Environment XII (1970), Louise Nevelson, purchased by the Association for Public Art
- The Wedges (1970), Robert Morris, acquired by the Association for Public Art, gift of Mr. and Mrs. H. Gates Lloyd
- Tiger at Bay (1965), Albino Manca, purchased by the Association for Public Art
- Three Way Piece Number 1: Points (1964), Henry Moore, purchased by the Association for Public Art
- Cow Elephant and Calf (1962), Heinz Warneke, commissioned by the Association for Public Art
- Bear and Cub (1957), Joseph J. Greenberg Jr., commissioned by the Association for Public Art
- The Spirit of Enterprise (1950–1960), Jacques Lipchitz, commissioned by the Association for Public Art
- Aero Memorial (1948), Paul Manship, commissioned by the Association for Public Art and Aero Club of Pennsylvania
- The Ellen Phillips Samuel Memorial (1933-1961), various artists, commissioned by the Association for Public Art
- The Mounted Amazon Attacked by a Panther (1839, cast 1929), August Kiss, commissioned by the Association for Public Art
- Shakespeare Memorial (1926), Alexander Stirling Calder, commissioned by the Association for Public Art, City of Philadelphia, and the Shakespeare Memorial Committee
- Thorfinn Karlsefni (1918), Einar Jónsson, commissioned by the Association for Public Art and J. Bunford Samuel
- Billy (1914), Albert Laessle, gift of Eli Kirke Price II to the Association for Public Art
- Duck Girl (1911), Paul Manship, purchased by the Association for Public Art
- Cowboy (1908), Frederic Remington, commissioned by the Association for Public Art
- The Medicine Man (1899), Cyrus E. Dallin, commissioned by the Association for Public Art
- General Ulysses S. Grant (1897), Daniel Chester French and Edward C. Potter, commissioned by the Association for Public Art
- James A. Garfield Monument (1895), Augustus Saint-Gaudens, commissioned by the Association for Public Art
- The Lion Fighter (1858, cast 1892), Albert Wolff, commissioned by the Association for Public Art
- Lion Crushing a Serpent 1832, cast 1891), Antoine-Louis Barye, purchased by the Association for Public Art
- Dickens and Little Nell (1890), Frank Edwin Elwell, purchased by the Association for Public Art
- Stone Age in America (1887) by John J. Boyle, commissioned by the Association for Public Art
- Major General George Gordon Meade (1887), Alexander Milne Calder, commissioned by the Association for Public Art
- The Dying Lioness (1873), Wilhelm Franz Alexander Friedrich Wolff, commissioned by the Association for Public Art
- Night (1872), Edward Stauch, purchased by the Association for Public Art
- Hudson Bay Wolves Quarreling Over the Carcass of a Deer (1872), Edward Kemeys, purchased by the Association for Public Art

== Publications ==
- New Land Marks: public art, community, and the meaning of place, 2001
- Public Art in Philadelphia, 1992
- Form and Function: Proposals for Public Art for Philadelphia, 1982
- Sculpture of a City: Philadelphia's Treasures in Bronze and Stone, 1974

== Awards and recognition ==
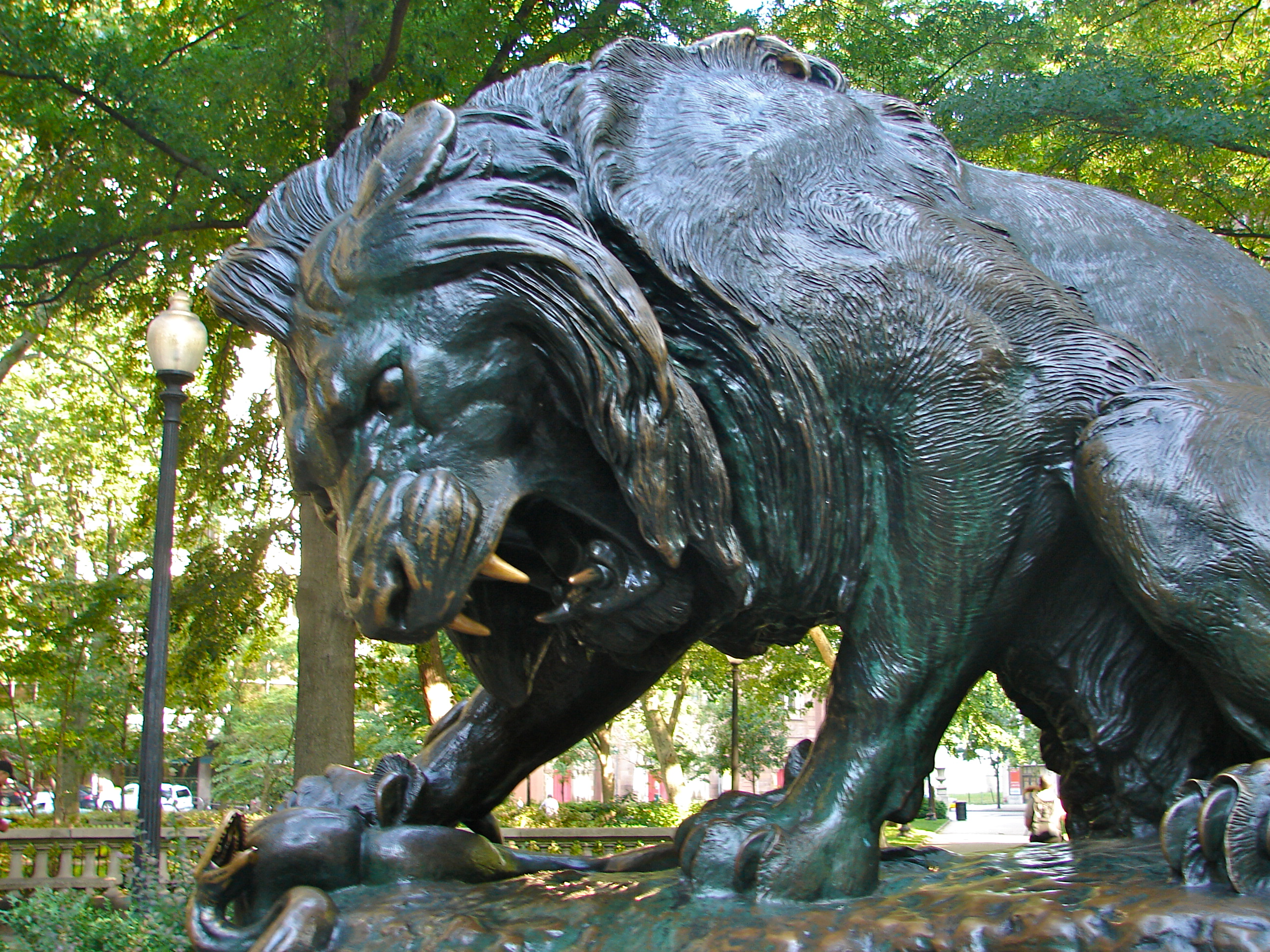
Lion Crushing a Serpent (1832) by Antoine Louis Barye

- Wyck-Strickland Award for aPA Executive Director Penny Balkin Bach, 2019
- Public Art Network Award, Americans for the Arts, 2015
- Best of Philly ® 2014 – New Public Artwork for Roxy Paine's Symbiosis, 2014
- Inaugural Tyler Tribute Award for aPA Executive Director Penny Balkin Bach, 2013
- PAD award for achievement in the field of public art for aPA Executive Director Penny Balkin Bach, 2013
- AASLH Award of Merit, American Association for State and Local History, 2011
- PNC Arts Alive Award for Arts Innovation in Honor of Peggy Amsterdam, Arts and Business Council of Greater Philadelphia, 2011
- Named one of "10 great sculpture gardens across the USA," USA Today, 2011
- aPA public art projects I have a story to tell you... and Embodying Thoreau: dwelling, sitting, watching named among "the country's best," Year in Review, Americans for the Arts, 2004
- EDRA/Places Award for Place Planning, Environmental Design Research Association (EDRA) and the publication Places, A Forum of Environmental Design, 2002
- Henry J. Magaziner EFAIA Award, the AIA Philadelphia Historic Preservation Committee, 2002
- Award for Outstanding Commitment to the Preservation and Care of Collections, The American Institute for Conservation of Historic and Artistic Works and Heritage Preservation, 2000
- First-place SOS! Achievement Award, Save Outdoor Sculpture! (SOS!), 1999
- The Herbert Adams Memorial Medal for outstanding service to American sculpture, National Sculpture Society, 1979
- Centennial Award of Honor from The Philadelphia Chapter of American Institute of Architects, 1969

== See also ==
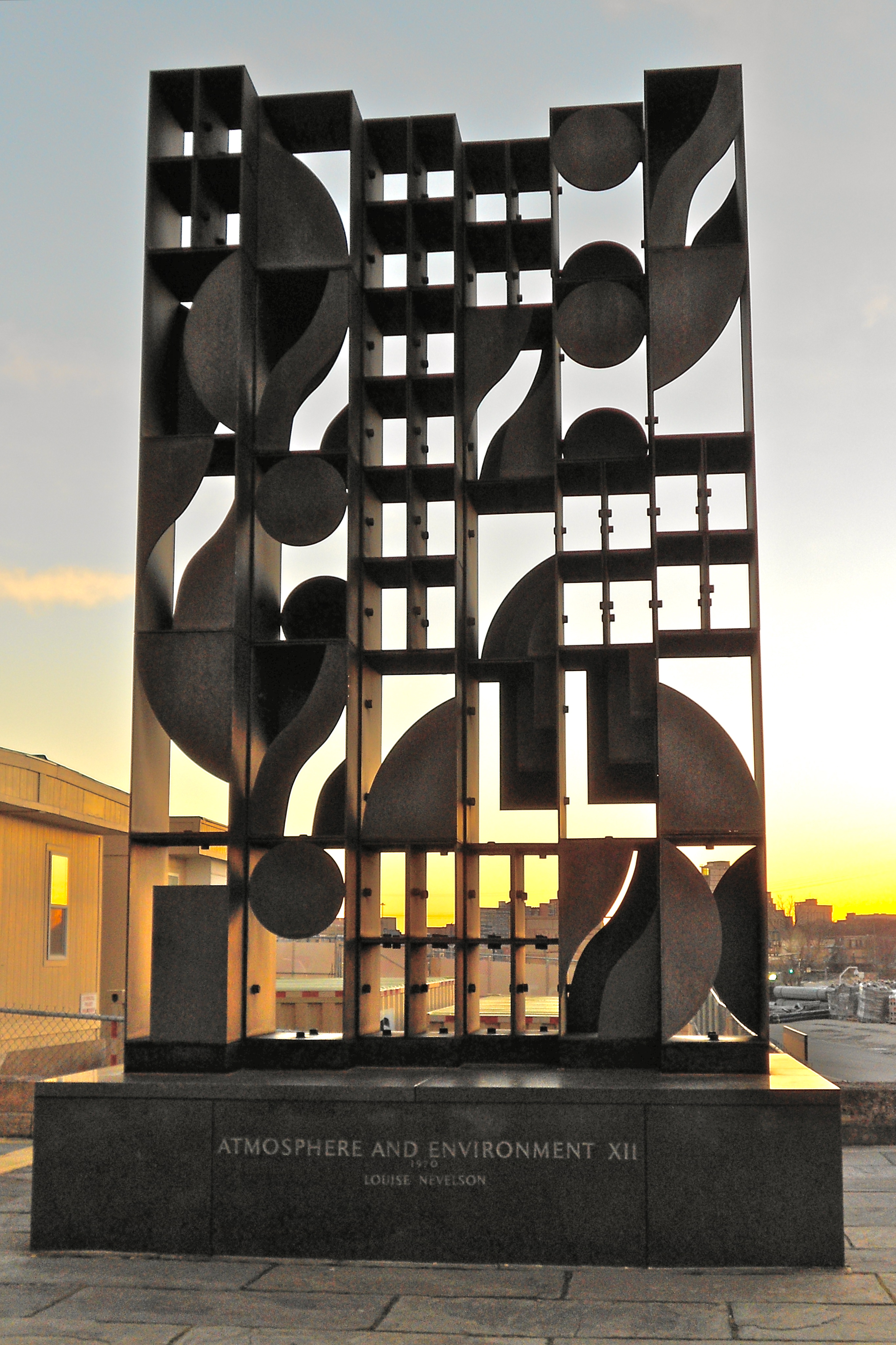
Atmosphere and Environment XII (1970) by Louise Nevelson

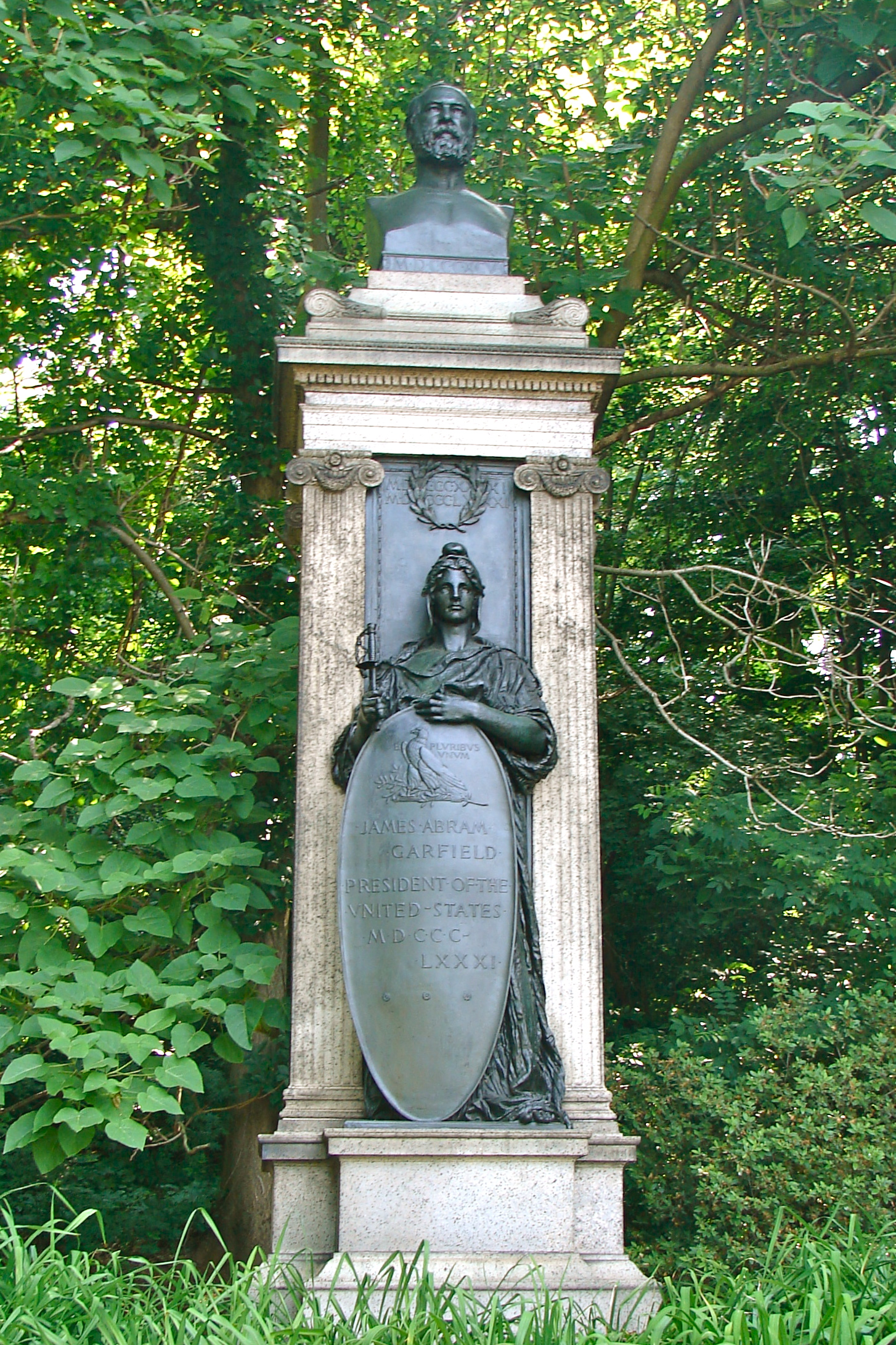
James A. Garfield Monument (1895) by Augustus Saint-Gaudens

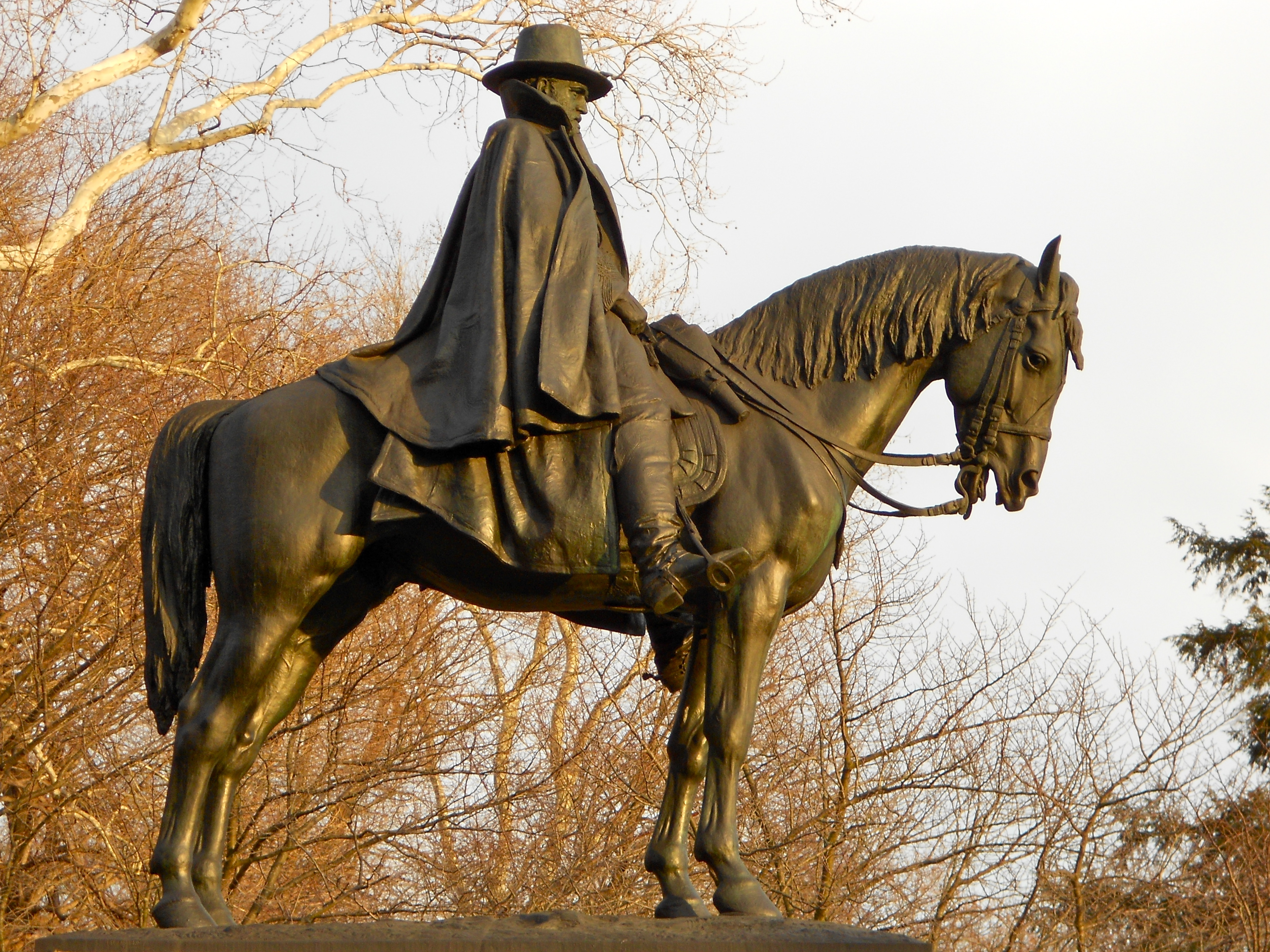
General Ulysses S. Grant (1897) by Daniel Chester French and Edward C. Potter

- List of public art in Philadelphia
- Mural Arts Philadelphia
