= Benoni d'Entremont =

- Born: c. 1745; Pubnico, Nova Scotia
- Died: February 21, 1841; Pubnico, Nova Scotia
- Spouse: Anne-Marguerite Pothier

Benoni d'Entremont (c. 1745 – February 21, 1841) was a mariner, shipbuilder, office holder, justice of the peace, and militia officer in Nova Scotia of Acadian descent.

== Early life ==
He was born in Pubnico, Nova Scotia, around 1745, the son of Jacques Mius d'Entremont, third Baron de Pobomcoup, and Marguerite Amirault.

On August 29, 1766, at the age of 21, he returned from exile, arriving in Pubnico with his family and eight others. After his return, he became involved in the civic affairs of Yarmouth County. He was the first Acadian Magistrate and Justice of the Peace in Nova Scotia, recorded in 1780; first Assessor for the Municipality of Argyle the same year, and the first Treasurer of that district, having been appointed the following year. In July 1783, he married Anne-Marguerite Pothier, and they had nine children. In 1813, he was appointed a Justice of the Inferior Court of Common Place for the County of Yarmouth, a position he had already held for many years in the District of Argyle. He died on February 21, 1841, in Pubnico.

== Personal life ==
He married Anne-Marguerite Pothier in 1783. His son, Simon d'Entremont, was one of the first Acadians elected to a legislative assembly in North America.
