= Simon d'Entremont =

Canadian politician

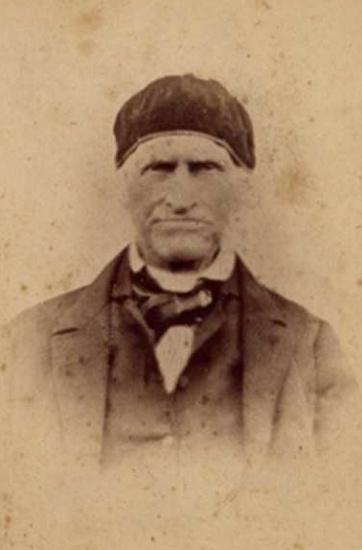
- Simon d'Entremont, 1880]

Member of the House of Assembly
- In office 1836–1840
- Succeeded by: John Ryder
- Constituency: Argyle township

Personal details
- Born: October 28, 1788 West Pubnico, Nova Scotia
- Died: September 6, 1886 (aged 97) East Pubnico, Nova Scotia
- Occupation: farmer, politician

Simon d'Entremont (October 28, 1788 – September 6, 1886) was a farmer and political figure in Nova Scotia of Acadian descent. He represented Argyle township in the Nova Scotia House of Assembly from 1836 to 1840. D'Entremont and Frederick Armand Robicheau, elected in the same election are believed to be the first Acadians elected to a legislative assembly in North America. (Joseph Winniett, whose mother was Acadian, was the first Acadian to serve in the Nova Scotia House of Assembly in 1761.)

He was born in West Pubnico, Nova Scotia, the son of Benoni d'Entremont and Anne-Marguerite Pothier. In 1810, he married Elizabeth Larkin. D’Entremont married Élisabeth Thériault in 1831 after the death of his first wife. He was defeated when he ran for reelection in 1840. D'Entremont served as a justice of the peace for Yarmouth County and was customs officer for the ports of Argyle from 1854 to 1864. He died in East Pubnico.
