= George Harold Waldo Haag =

American architect (1910–1998)

G. Harold W. Haag
- Born: July 14, 1910; Philadelphia, Pennsylvania
- Died: 1998 (aged 87–88); Ivytown, Pennsylvania
- Education: University of Pennsylvania (Class of 1934)
- Occupation: Architect
- Awards: Various (see listed alongside works)
- Practice: Partner in Berninger, Haag & d'Entremont (fl. 1946-1946) and Haag & d'Entremont (fl. 1946-)

George Harold Waldo Haag , FAIA, (July 14, 1910 - 1998) was an American architect focused on “school plant design and architecture,” based in Bucks County, Pennsylvania, who practiced nationally in the mid twentieth century but particularly in Pennsylvania. He was partners in the firms of Berninger, Haag & d'Entremont (fl. 1946-1946) and Haag & d'Entremont (fl. 1946-).

== Early life and education ==
Haag was born on July 14, 1910, in Philadelphia. He attended Abington High School and earned his Bachelor of Architecture from the University of Pennsylvania's School of Fine Arts in 1934, and was affiliated with the university's architectural society in 1933.

== Architectural career ==
Haag joined the AIA in 1945, and was named a fellow there in 1966.

He worked as a draftsman from June 1936 to June 1937 at the offices of Edmund George Good, 915 Second Street, Harrisburg, Pennsylvania, and transferred to work at Bernigner & Bower, 304 York Road, Jenkintown, as a senior draftsman from Jan 1937 to Sept 1939. Thereafter he practiced in Ivyland under his own name until February 1942 when he served in the U.S. Navy during World War II.

After being discharged, he went back to his previous employer, Bernigner & Bower as a partner of Berninger, Haag & d'Entremont in 1946, and later Haag & d'Entremont from 1946 throughout the rest of his career. His principal partner was Paul Theodore d'Entremont. The firm worked from 445 Cedar Street, Jenkintown, Pennsylvania 19046.

Haag served as president of the Bucks County AIA Chapter from 1961 to 1962, a board member of the Pennsylvania Society of Architects from 1961 to 1965, treasurer there in 1962, vice president there in 1963, president there in 1964, and regional director of Pennsylvania from 1966 to 1969. On the national level reflecting his chapter origins in a wealthy county, he was the chairman of the AIA fund-raising committee from 1966 to 1968, chairman of the headquarters committee from 1966 to 1968, and chairman of the task force on Turnkey in 1968, and member of the finance committee in 1968 as well as several other committees. He was licensed to practice in Delaware, Florida, Connecticut, New York, New Jersey, and Pennsylvania, before being nationally certified.

In additional, Haag was also a lecturer at Dartmouth College in 1969, a panelist and moderator for many programs on school plant design and architectural discussions.

== Personal life ==
Haag served on the executive committee of Bucks County, Pennsylvania, the Boys Scouts of American in 1962, the planning committee of Ivyland from 1964 onwards, and was on an adviser for the government advisory committee to the State Board of Education in Harrisburg, Pennsylvania, from 1964 to 1969. Haag served in the U.S. Navy as a Lieutenant Commander from 1942 to 1945.

In 1970, he lived on Green Meadows, Ivyland, Pennsylvania 18974.

== Works as Haag & d'Entremont ==
- 1960: Cold Spring Elementary School, Upper Moreland Township. Montgomery County, Pennsylvania (p. 28)
- 1960: Continental Arms Apartments, King of Prussia, Pennsylvania (p. 28)
- 1960: Herbert Hoover Elementary School, Middletown Township. Bucks County, Pennsylvania (p. 29)
- 1963-1965: Eugene Klinger Jr. High School, Southampton, Pennsylvania (Honor Award, 1963)
- 1965: Unami Jr. High School, Chalfont, Pennsylvania
- 1967: Willow Hill Elementary School, (Honor Award, 1967)
- 1967: Log Col. Jr. High School, Warminster Township, Pennsylvania
- 1968: McKinley Elementary School, Abington Township, Pennsylvania (Honor Award from the Pennsylvania Society of Architects, 1968)
- 1968: Myers Elementary School addition (Honor Award from the American Association School Administration, 1968)
- 1969: Cent. Bucks E. High School, Buckingham, Pennsylvania
