= André Provana de Leyni =

Italian statesman and military commander in the Duchy of Savoy

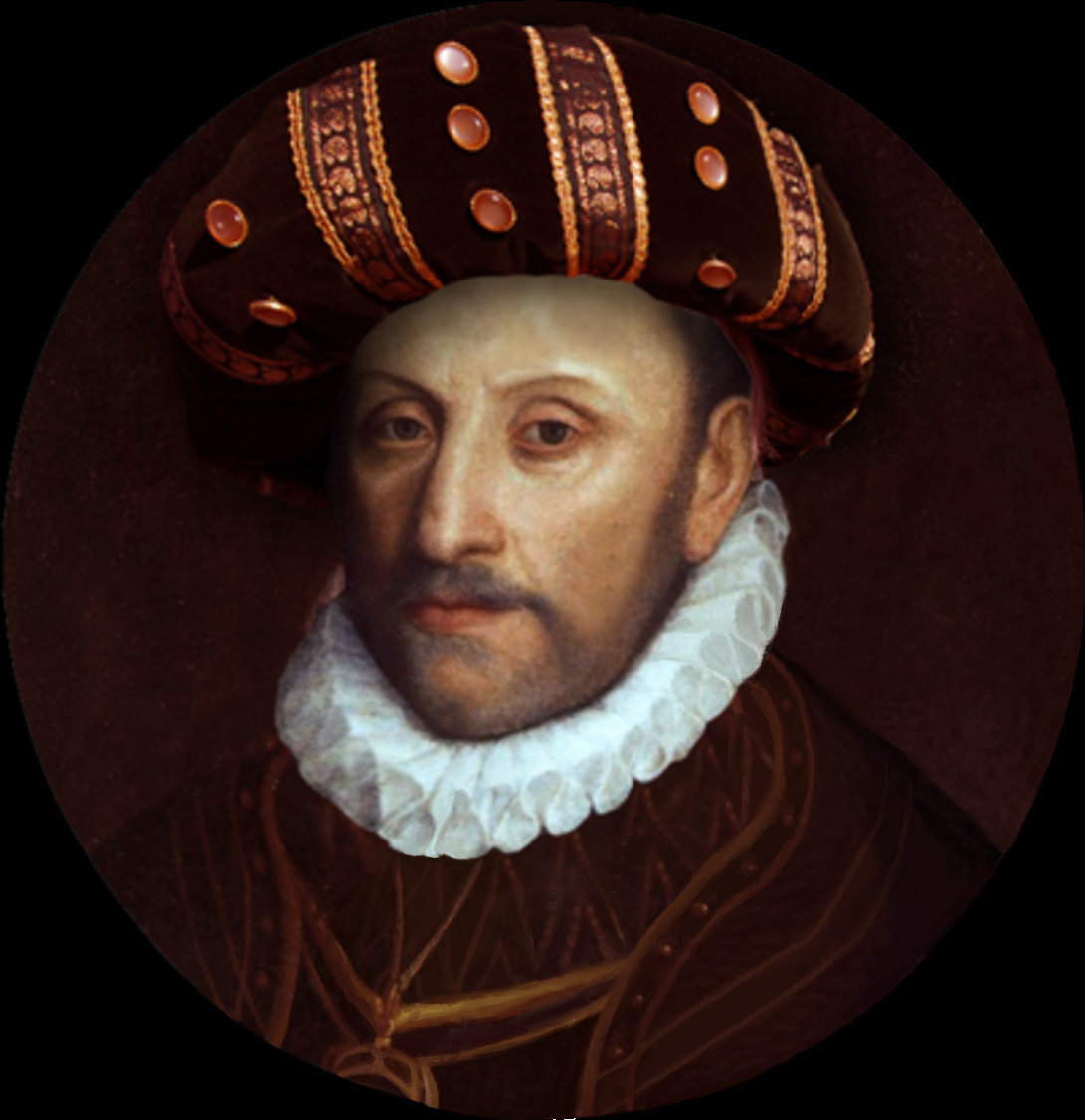

André or Andrea II Provana de Leyni (1511, Leinì, Piedmont - 29 May 1592, Nice) was a statesman and military commander in the Duchy of Savoy. He was captain-general of the duke of Savoy's galleys and councillor and diplomat in the service of Emmanuel Philibert, Duke of Savoy and his son Charles Emmanuel I, Duke of Savoy. He was one of the most important figures in the restoration of the States of Savoy in the 16th century after its occupation by Francis I of France.

He bore the titles of lord of Leyni, count of Frossasco, Alpignano, Castellata and Balangero, knight of the Supreme Order of the Most Holy Annunciation and grand admiral of the Order of Saint Maurice and Saint Lazarus.

== Bibliography ==
- (in French) « Provana » in Biographie universelle, ancienne et moderne : histoire par ordre alphabétique de la vie publique et privée de tous les hommes, Volume 78, Michaud frères, Paris, 1811.
- (in French) E. Casanova, « Provana » in La Grande Encyclopédie : inventaire raisonné des sciences, des lettres et des arts. Tome 27, Henri Lamirault, Paris, 1885–1902.
- (in Italian) N. Mosso, « Andrea Provana » in Biografia Iconografica degli uomini celebri che dal X secolo fino ai dì nostri fiorirono nei paesi oggidì componenti la monarchia di Savoia, Opera a Beneficio del R. Ricovero di Mendicità, Tipografia Baricco Araldi, Turin, 1845.
- (in Italian) Umberto Salvo, Alpignano e Andrea Provana. Le straordinarie imprese del Conte di Alpignano il Grande Ammiraglio Andrea Provana nel IV centenario della sua morte (1592-1992), Piero Melli, Suse, 1992.
