= Haag & d'Entremont =

American architecture firm

Haag & d'Entremont was a mid-twentieth-century American architecture firm known for school architecture, which practiced nationally but particularly focused its work in Pennsylvania. The firm was established in 1946 (79 years ago) by Dominique Berninger (1898–1949), George Harold Waldo Haag, FAIA (1910–1996), and Paul (Theodore) d'Entremont (1908–1988) as Berninger, Haag & d'Entremont and quickly re-established that same year after the departure of Berninger as Haag & d'Entremont. It was the successor firm to Berninger & Bower, based in Jenkintown and active from 1935 to 1945, of which Dominique Berninger was partner and at which at least Haag had previously worked. Haag & d'Entremont practiced out of the office of 445 Cedar St, Jenkintown, Pennsylvania 19046.

Berninger & Bower had a number of school designs to their credit, and Haag & d'Entremont, as successors, carrying on this educational specialization to build many "suburban schools during the post-war boom of 1945–1970. Internationalism/Modernism of the 1930/1940′s was the artistic influence on [d'Entremont's] generation and his buildings expressed an exuberance in clean lines, bright open spaces and the latest technology in building materials."

== Works as Haag & d'Entremont ==
- 1960: Cold Spring Elementary School, Upper Moreland Township. Montgomery County, Pennsylvania (p. 28)
- 1960: Continental Arms Apartments, King of Prussia, Pennsylvania (p. 28)
- 1960: Herbert Hoover Elementary School, Middletown Township. Bucks County, Pennsylvania (p. 29)
- 1963–1965: Eugene Klinger Jr. High School, Southampton, Pennsylvania (Honor Award, 1963)
- 1965: Unami Jr. High School, Chalfont, Pennsylvania
- 1967: Willow Hill Elementary School, Willow Grove, Pennsylvania (Honor Award, 1967)
- 1967: Log Col. Jr. High School, Warminster Township, Pennsylvania
- 1968: McKinley Elementary School, Abington Township, Pennsylvania (Honor Award from the Pennsylvania Society of Architects, 1968)
- 1968: Myers Elementary School addition, Elkins Park, Pennsylvania (Honor Award from the American Association School Administration, 1968)
- 1969: Cent. Bucks E. High School, Buckingham, Pennsylvania
- 1975: Abington Senior High School (credited to d'Entremont), Abington Township, Pennsylvania
