= Paul Theodore d'Entremont =

American designer and architect

Paul d'Entremont
- Born: 1908; Pubnico, Nova Scotia, Canada
- Died: 1988; Pennsylvania
- Education: Massachusetts Institute of Technology
- Occupation: Architect
- Awards: Various (see listed alongside works)
- Practice: Partner in Berninger, Haag & d'Entremont (fl. 1946-1946) and Haag & d'Entremont (fl. 1946-1988)

Paul Theodore d'Entremont, AIA, (1908–1988), was an American designer and architect focused on school architecture and based in Bucks County, Pennsylvania, who practiced nationally in the mid twentieth century but particularly in Pennsylvania. He was a partner in the firm of Berninger, Haag & d'Entremont (1946) and its successor Haag & d'Entremont (1946–1988).

== Early life and education ==
Paul d'Entremont was born on November 18, 1908, in Pubnico, Nova Scotia, Canada. His family "had lived in Nova Scotia since 1653". He attended high school in Pubnico, and studied engineering at the Lowell Institute of Massachusetts Institute of Technology, Cambridge, Massachusetts. He was a member of the T-Square Club in Philadelphia where he studied architecture under Paul Philippe Cret, receiving his Certification in Architecture in 1945. In 1941 he and his wife settled in Feasterville, Pennsylvania.

== Architectural career ==
D'Entremont worked as a draftsman from 1928 to 1930 at the offices of Dwight P. Robinson of Boston and transferred to work at the United Engineers & Constructors of Philadelphia on Broad & Arch Streets until 1932. From 1935 to 1937 he worked as a draftsman for the Board of Education, thereafter from 1938 to 1939 as an architectural designer for Malone & Williams in Salisbury, Maryland. He returned to Philadelphia in 1939 to work as an architectural designer for the Ballinger Co. on 12th and Chestnut Streets until 1941 and then transferred back to United Engineers & Constructors, working there until 1943.

He joined the Philadelphia chapter of the American Institute of Architects in late 1945. He joined Harold Haag in 1946 as partner in what had been Bernigner & Bower but which now became Berninger, Haag & d'Entremont, and by the end of the year just Haag & d'Entremont. The partnership appears to have lasted for the rest of his career. The firm worked from 445 Cedar Street, Jenkintown, Pennsylvania 19046.

Carrying on educational specializations and connections wrought by its predecessor firm of Bernigner & Bower, the firm built many "suburban schools during the post-war boom of 1945–1970. Internationalism/Modernism of the 1930/1940's was the artistic influence on [d'Entremont's] generation and his buildings expressed an exuberance in clean lines, bright open spaces and the latest technology in building materials."

A month before he died, Paul d'Entremont stated of his work: "I wish my buildings had all been made of stone, … Because they'd last a thousand years…"

== Personal life ==
Around 1937, Paul married Grace Berst d'Entremont, an artist, in Philadelphia while she was studying there at the Pennsylvania Academy of the Fine Arts. They had four children: Marc, Nicole, Peter and Philip. Marc d'Entremont, Paul's son, said of his designer father and artist mother: "They had a 51-year artistic collaboration resulting in numerous public works of art with the award-winning architectural firm of Haag & d'Entremont....Examples of her work can be found at Assumption of the Blessed Virgin Mary Church in Feasterville and numerous schools in Bucks and Montgomery Counties."

== Works as Haag & d'Entremont ==
- 1960: Cold Spring Elementary School, Upper Moreland Township. Montgomery County, Pennsylvania (p. 28)
- 1960: Continental Arms Apartments, King of Prussia, Pennsylvania (p. 28)
- 1960: Herbert Hoover Elementary School, Middletown Township, Bucks County, Pennsylvania (p. 29)
- 1963-1965: Eugene Klinger Junior High School, Southampton, Pennsylvania (Honor Award, 1963)
- 1965: Unami Junior High School, Chalfont, Pennsylvania
- 1967: Willow Hill Elementary School, (Honor Award, 1967)
- 1967: Log Col. Jr. High School, Warminster Township, Pennsylvania
- 1968: McKinley Elementary School, Abington Township, Pennsylvania (Honor Award from the Pennsylvania Society of Architects, 1968)
- 1968: Myers Elementary School addition (Honor Award from the American Association School Administration, 1968)
- 1969: Cent. Bucks E. High School, Buckingham, Pennsylvania
- 1975: Abington Senior High School (credited to d'Entremont)
