= Charles de Montmorency, Duke of Damville =

French noble and Admiral

Charles de Montmorency
- Seigneur de Méru; Duke of Damville; Admiral of France
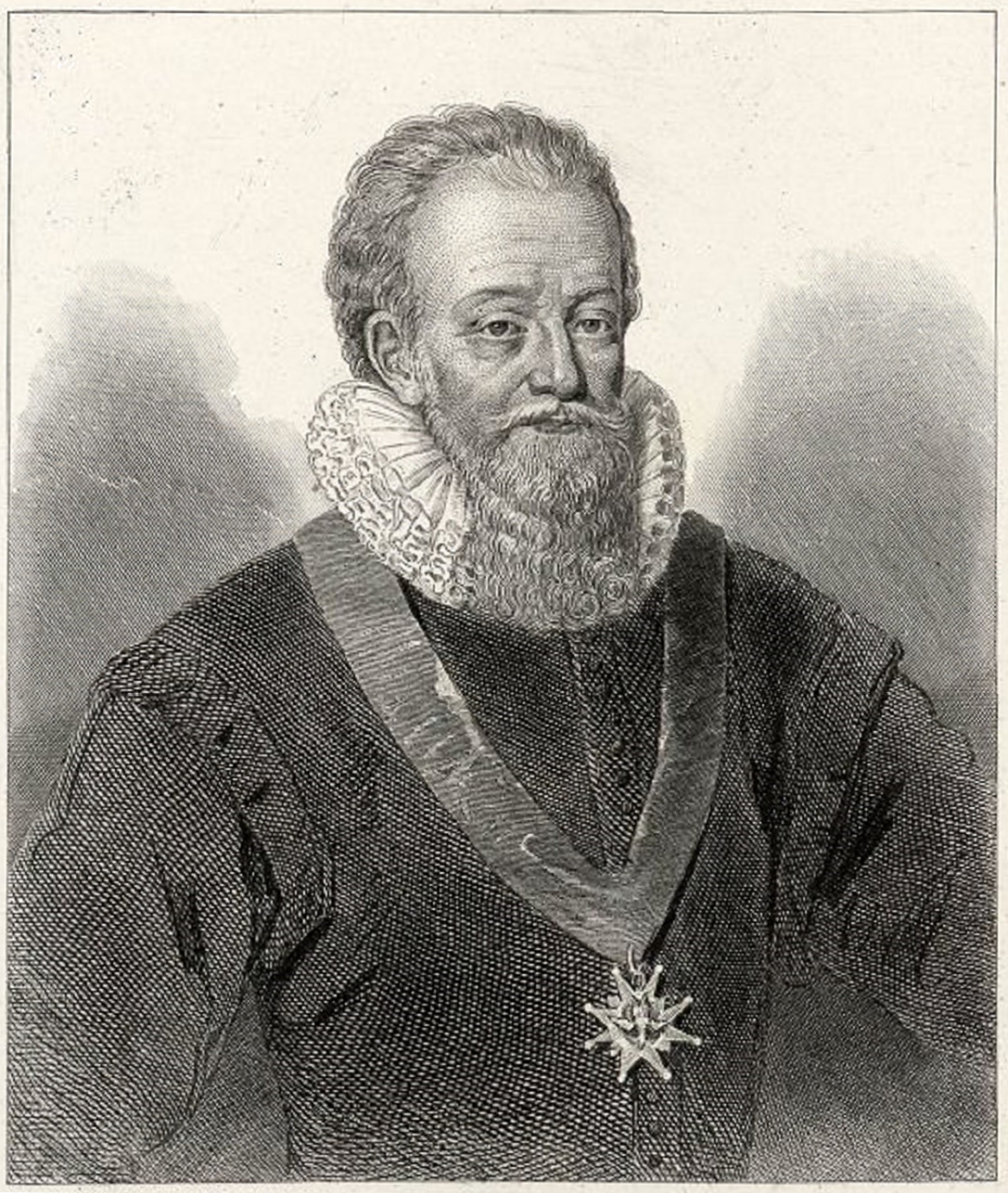
- Impression by Léopold Massard
- Born: c. 1537
- Died: c. 1612
- Noble family: Montmorency
- Spouse: Renée de Cossé
- Father: Anne de Montmorency
- Mother: Madeleine de Savoie

Charles de Montmorency, Duke of Damville (c. 1537–c. 1612) was a French aristocrat, military commander, rebel and Admiral during the French Wars of Religion. Damville was the son of Anne de Montmorency, chief favourite of Henri II and Madeleine of Savoy granting him a central place in French politics. As a result, in 1562 he was elevated as lieutenant-general of the Île de France, serving under his elder brother François de Montmorency. In 1567, with the establishment of the king's brother Anjou as lieutenant-general of the French army, Méru joined his council to advise him on political matters. Méru participated in the siege of La Rochelle in 1573 under the direction of Anjou. Around this time he developed a proximity to the younger brother of the king Alençon.

In 1574, he and his brother Thoré surrounded Alençon and encouraged his ambition. After their elder brother abandoned the court in February, their plans with the young prince became more serious, and Alençon entered conspiracy to flee court and put himself at the head of a rebellion. After two failed efforts to accomplish this, the Montmorency family fell under suspicion for their involvement in his indiscretions. The duke of Montmorency was lured to court then arrested, while Thoré and Méru fled ahead of an arrest order. The arrest of the duke pushed their other brother Damville, governor of Languedoc into open rebellion. The three men would form an alliance with the French Protestants for their rebellion. Thoré and Méru had by now fled to Strasbourg where they worked to recruit a German mercenary army with the help of the prince of Condé. Méru secured financial support from Elizabeth I. In January 1576 the army invaded France, and Henri III was forced into a generous peace towards the rebels. Méru would remain close to Alençon and support him in his efforts to become king of Nederland in the following years, both through the raising of troops and negotiating the terms by which he was established as king in 1580. In 1579, his eldest brother the duke of Montmorency died, and Damville succeeded him, vacating the title of Damville to Méru. In 1596 Damville was elevated to the position of Admiral by Henri IV. Henri developed an increasingly autocratic rule that alienated many grand nobles, including Damville. Damville died in 1612.

== Early life and family ==
=== Family ===
Charles de Montmorency was born in 1537 the third son of Anne de Montmorency and Madeleine of Savoy. Anne de Montmorency was paramount favourite of first François I and then Henri II, becoming Constable of France. His elder brothers François de Montmorency and Henri de Montmorency would each become duke of Montmorency (in 1567 and 1579 respectively). Meanwhile, his younger brothers Guillaume de Montmorency and Gabriel de Montmorency would both predecease him (in 1593 and 1562 respectively). He also had three younger sisters Eléonore de Montmorency, Jeanne de Montmorency and Catherine de Montmorency, two of whom would predecease him.

=== Marriage ===
Damville would be married to Renée de Cossé, the daughter of Marshal Cossé in 1571. She brought with her a dowry of 30,000 livres. The couple would not have any children.

== Reign of François II ==
By 1560, Méru was serving François II as a gentilhomme ordinaire de la chambre. One of around 70 men granted the charge.

== Reign of Charles IX ==
=== Early wars of religion ===
In March 1562, shortly before the outbreak of the first War of Religion, Méru was appointed as the lieutenant-general of the Île de France under the authority of the governor, his brother François de Montmorency eldest son of the duke of Montmorency.

A few years later, while the court was residing in Bordeaux during the grand tour of the kingdom being conducted by Charles IX and his mother Catherine de' Medici, Charles desired to try and work on his dancing in private in preparation for festivities that were to take place at Bayonne. Méru snuck into the room in which Charles was practicing and hid behind a curtain. Charles discovered his presence and was furious, chasing him from the room. Méru believed himself to have been betrayed by the young duke of Guise and remarked, 'if someone other than the king had brought me out from behind that curtain, I would have plunged my dagger into their chest'. The king's brother Anjou who was listening, was quick to respond that if he had discovered Méru prying on him he would have thrown him out the window.

In 1567 with the death of the duke of Montmorency, Anjou was established at the head of the French army. To assist him in military matters the duke of Nemours, Montpensier and Marshal Cossé were selected. Meanwhile, a council was established to advise him on other matters, composed of his military advisers, Villequier, the duke of Longueville, Montpensier's son the prince dauphin d'Auvergne and Méru.

During the late 1560s, the crown became increasingly insecure about the loyalty of the upper nobility. To reinforce this demographic, it was decided to expand the conferring of the honour of the Ordre de Saint-Michel. To this end it was decided to allow senior nobles to confer a limited number of the awards themselves upon their own clients. The Montmorency clan received the rights to nominate 18 chevaliers, with Méru granted two of this number to choose at his discretion.

=== Assassination of Admiral Coligny ===
On 22 August, an attempt was made on the life of Admiral Coligny. The following day, the king came to visit Coligny where he was recuperating from his wound in bed. Travelling with the king for his audience with the magnate were three of the Montmorency brothers Damville, Thoré and Méru. Coligny and the king discussed the prospect of an invasion of the Spanish Netherlands and the enforcement of the Peace of Saint-Germain-en-Laye.

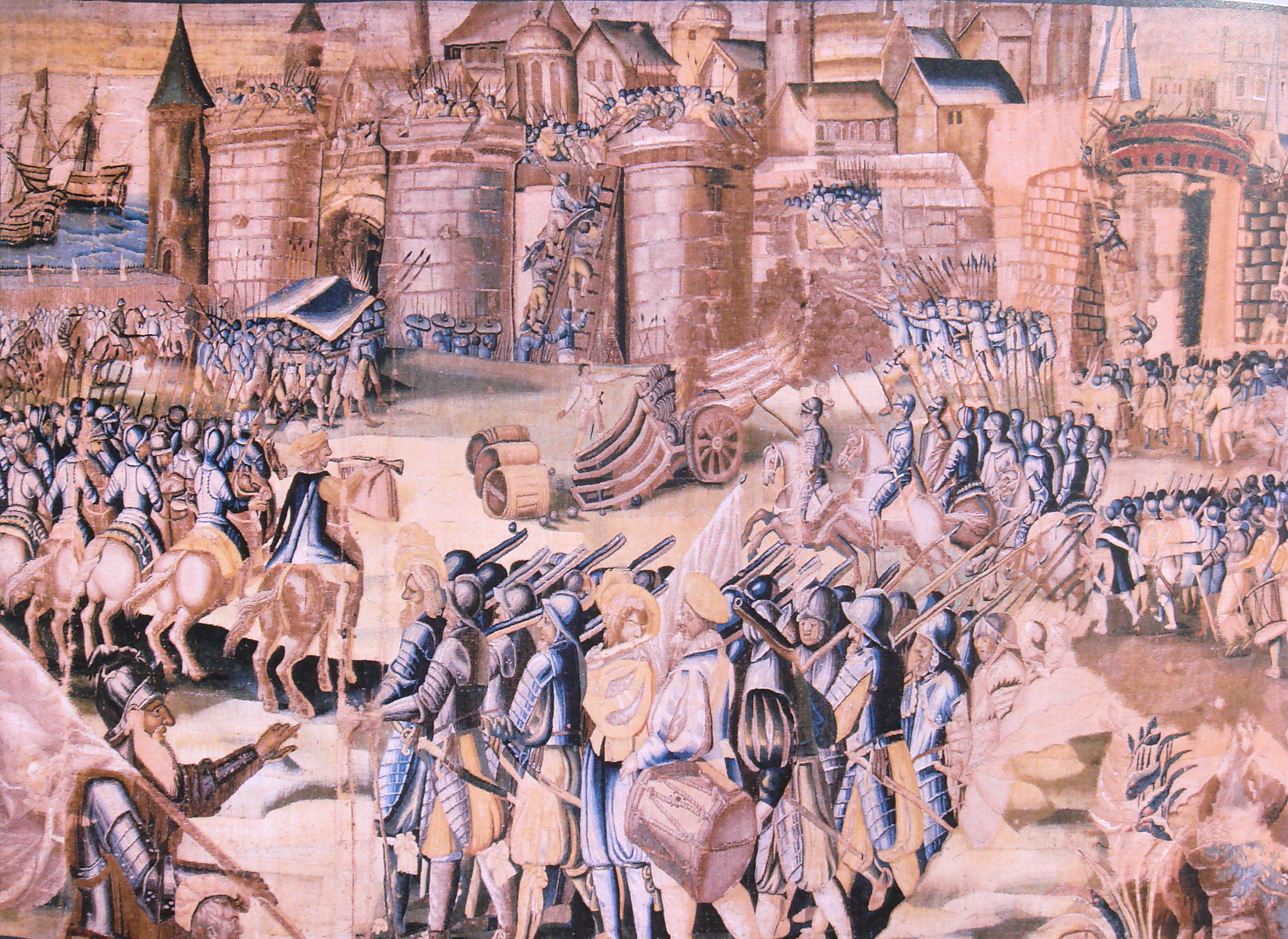
Conduct of the siege of La Rochelle

The siege of La Rochelle in 1573 was the first opportunity of many young nobles to demonstrate their military skill. As such they flocked to join the siege lines under the command of the king's brother Anjou. Among the nobles who hurried to the city in February 1573 were Thoré and Méru.

=== Malcontent ===
During that year, both Méru and Thoré were more open to rebelling against the crown than their elder brothers. They surrounded the brother to the king Alençon alongside the vicomte de Turenne, feeding the young prince's dissatisfaction with his position.

On 16 February 1574 the duke of Guise assaulted the sieur de Ventrabren a servant of Alençon, accusing the duke of Montmorency of having hired the noble to assassinate him. Shortly thereafter Montmorency departed court in disgust. With the duke gone, his younger brothers Méru and Thoré started congregating in Alençon's apartments and began plotting conspiracy against the crown in earnest. While the duke had remained, the family had maintained access to the avenues of power, deprived him they were left to pursue more radical means to assert themselves over the Lorraine family.

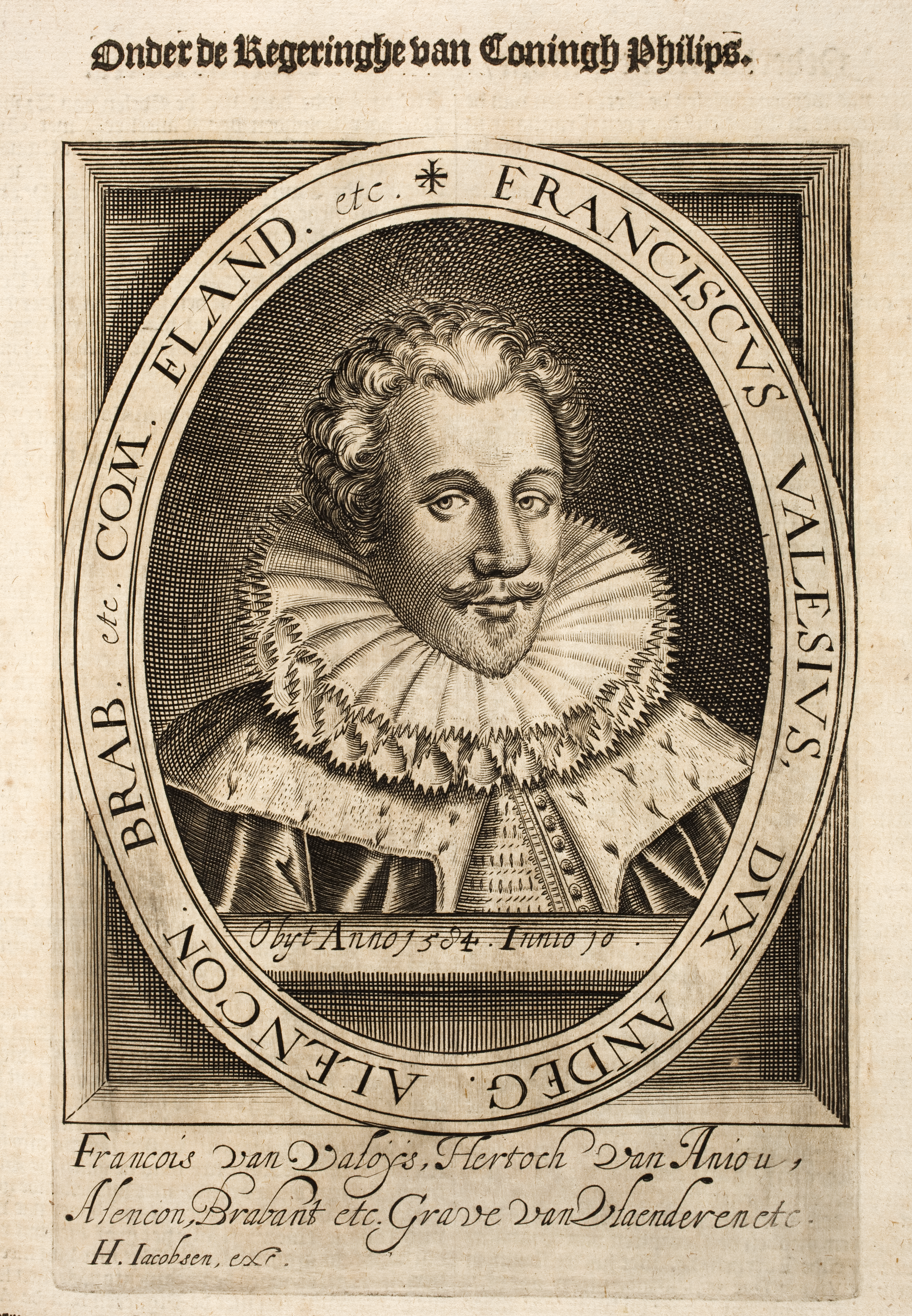
Brother of the king, Alençon

In April 1574 Alençon made a failed attempted to flee court, in the interrogations that followed the Montmorency family was accused of involvement.

After a failed attack in 1574 by Damville, designed to force the king to release from quasi captivity the king of Navarre and the king's brother Alençon, the crown responded by arresting the duke of Montmorency and imprisoning him in Vincennes on 4 May. Alongside Montmorency, Marshal Cossé was also imprisoned, Cossé was Méru's father in law. Méru and Thoré meanwhile received warning of the impending arrests and fled court shortly before they were due to be rounded up. The two arrests the monarchy had succeeded in allowed the king to strike at Thoré and Méru without having them to hand to arrest however. As a further consequence Damville was deprived of his governorship of Languedoc, even if it was impossible to dislodge him in any practical capacity. As a result of this assault against his family, Damville and his two brothers, Méru and Thoré entered into an alliance with the Protestants of southern France in opposition to the crown. This alliance was forged over the objections of the Protestant clerics, who had little taste for a concord with Catholic magnates. While Damville would lead resistance in his governate, Méru and Thoré escaped across the border into the Holy Roman Empire. In Strasbourg they united with the young prince de Condé.

In the conspiratorial discourses that swirled in the pamphlets of the time, it was claimed that Méru was one of the victims of a 'group of foreigners' who were presently governing France and leading the country into ruin.

== Reign of Henri III ==
=== Rebel ===
On 30 May 1574 Charles IX died, and with no sons, the succession defaulted to his brother Anjou who styled himself Henri III. He was currently in the Polish-Lithuanian Commonwealth ruling there as king, and upon receipt of the news made to hurry back to France. His return to France would be hazardous, as Méru, Thoré and Condé were in the process of raising an army from the Protestant princes of the empire to invade France with. Despite being in rebellion, Méru would accompany Henri for part of his journey back to France, during his passage through Savoie. It would primarily be through Condé's efforts that the army was raised with the son of the elector Palatine, Méru meanwhile was instrumental in securing the financial backing of Elizabeth I of England for the rebel cause. In his entreaty to Elizabeth he described the motivating factor as being a response to the Massacre of Saint Bartholomew in which 'innocent blood of many valiant men was spilled' in a 'long planned' betrayal. Further betrayals were to be found in the domination of the French court by the Lorraine family and various Italians. With a mercenary invasion of France looking to be increasingly close to coming to pass, the crown sought to leverage the imprisonment of Montmorency. He was warned that if the German reiters entered the kingdom he would be executed. It was hoped by this means he would persuade his brothers to back down from their rebellion. He was at first defiant, urging Henri to carry out his threats, however he moderated himself and on 28 August wrote a letter to Damville, Thoré and Méru to that effect. It was clear to its recipients that it had been attained under duress and they ignored it, with Damville resuming an offensive against the duc d'Uzès.

On 16 September Alençon succeeded in escaping from court, and promptly used the leverage his rebellion held to secure the release of Montmorency, who was allowed his freedom on 2 October.

In parallel to these developments Thoré led the advanced guard of the German mercenary army across the border into France, he was bested by the duke of Guise at the Battle of Dormans. Despite this failure, Thoré was able to extract himself from the debacle. Méru let it be known that the main mercenary army of 8000 reitres and 8000 Swiss would invade France on Saint-Martin's day (11 November). In fact, the main mercenary army would roll into France in January 1576, carving a path through Champagne.

By May 1576, the crown felt compelled to make peace with the rebels. The terms were generous to Alençon and his noble backers, but also to French Protestants.

=== Alençon ===
Méru remained close to Alençon, and in 1578 took responsibility for raising troops to support his plans for entry into the Spanish Netherlands. The soldiers he raised were deplored by the contemporary writer Claude Haton who denounced them for the depredations they wrought in the French countryside as 'specialists in rape, ransom and horse theft'.

The duke of Montmorency died in 1579, and Méru's elder brother Damville became duke, relinquishing his title of Damville to Méru in turn.

In September 1580, Alençon entered formal negotiations with the Dutch States General to be established as king of Nederland. A delegation of Dutch representatives arrived at Plessis-lès-Tours on 6 September to work out the specific parameters of his kingship. Among those nobles present on Alençon's behalf to negotiate were La Châtre, La Fin, the duke of Elbeuf and Damville. After a period of tense negotiations, an acceptable arrangement was agreed, and Alençon became king of Nederland.

By the late 1580s, Henri had established two prime favourites, Joyeuse and Épernon. In 1587 the latter was married to a rich southern heiress, Marguerite de Foix-Candale. At the wedding, both Damville and Thoré involved themselves in the ceremony as uncles to the bride.

== Reign of Henri IV ==
In 1596, upon the death of Admiral Villars, Damville became Admiral of France.

As the reign of Henri continued, there was growing discontent among the great magnates of the realm at his increasingly autocratic style of rule. Damville embodied this frustration when in a moment of frustration in 1601 he asked sarcastically whether it was Henri's intention to rule while consulting only his ministers Villeroy and Sully. He further complained that even the provincial governors were largely denied any authority over their territories. Other magnates, such as the Duke of Biron took their discontent further into treason.

Damville died in 1612.

== Sources ==
- Baird, Henry (1880). History of the Rise of the Huguenots: Vol 2 of 2. Hodder & Stoughton.
- Chevallier, Pierre (1985). Henri III: Roi Shakespearien. Fayard.
- Cloulas, Ivan (1979). Catherine de Médicis. Fayard.
- Constant, Jean-Marie (1984). Les Guise. Hachette.
- Harding, Robert (1978). Anatomy of a Power Elite: the Provincial Governors in Early Modern France. Yale University Press.
- Heller, Henry (2003). Anti-Italianism in Sixteenth Century France. University of Toronto Press.
- Holt, Mack (2002). The Duke of Anjou and the Politique Struggle During the Wars of Religion. Cambridge University Press.
- Jouanna, Arlette (1998). Histoire et Dictionnaire des Guerres de Religion. Bouquins.
- Jouanna, Arlette (2015). The St Bartholomew's Day Massacre: The Mysteries of a Crime of State. Manchester University Press.
- Knecht, Robert (2014). Catherine de' Medici. Routledge.
- Pitts, Vincent (2012). Henri IV of France: His Reign and Age. Johns Hopkins University Press.
- Le Roux, Nicolas (2000). La Faveur du Roi: Mignons et Courtisans au Temps des Derniers Valois. Champ Vallon.
- Salmon, J.H.M (1979). Society in Crisis: France during the Sixteenth Century. Metheun & Co.
- Sutherland, Nicola (1980). The Huguenot Struggle for Recognition. Yale University Press.
- Ward, A.W.; Prothero, G.W.; Leathes, Stanley, eds. (1911). The Cambridge Modern History. Vol. XIII. Cambridge University Press.
