= Guillaume de Montmorency-Thoré =

French Politique Noble who fought in the French Wars of Religion

Guillaume de Montmorency
- Seigneur of Thoré
- Born: c. 1547
- Died: c. 1593
- Noble family: House of Montmorency
- Spouses: Léonore d'Humières; Anne de Lalaing
- Father: Anne de Montmorency
- Mother: Madeleine of Savoy

Guillaume de Montmorency, Seigneur of Thoré (c. 1547-c. 1593) was a French noble, and military commander during the latter French Wars of Religion. Thoré was among those Catholic nobles who were perceived as soft on Protestantism, and as such during the Massacre of Saint Bartholomew he feared for his life. Shortly after the massacre as France descended back into civil war, Thoré, lacking military experience and keen to prove himself militarily joined the siege of La Rochelle.

Shortly after the siege and the end of the fourth war of religion. Thoré began to conspire against the crown. He was among those who led the ambitious Alençon's mind with the notion of rebelling in favour of the captive Navarre and Condé's liberty. When the conspiracy was uncovered, Thoré, whose involvement was known was ordered arrested. He and his brother Méru fled to Germany, seeking to raise an army. Successful in this endeavour they were held off from return by the captivity of their brother Montmorency who they feared would be executed if they re-entered France. At this time however fearful of Alençon's factionalism and desiring to be assured of his loyalty the king ordered Montmorency's release.

Thoré led an advanced party of German reiters into France in October 1575, his small force would however be annihilated by Guise at the Battle of Dormans. Despite this loss, the main mercenary force would enter France in early 1576, and in combination with Alençon's escape from court the crown would be pressured into the favourable Peace of Monsieur.

== Early life and family ==
Guillaume de Montmorency, comte de Thoré was the fifth son of Anne de Montmorency and Madeleine of Savoy. Anne de Montmorency, a favourite of Henri II of France had brought the family incredibly influence and accumulation of privileges. His first son François inherited his ducal title and was Marshal of France. His second son Henri I de Montmorency-Damville also made Marshal and then Constable of France inherited his father's governorship of Languedoc an office he held from 1563-1614. His third son Méru was made Admiral of France.

Thoré married first Léonore d'Humières in 1561, however she died in 1563. He re-married to Anne de Lalaing in 1581.

== Reign of Charles IX ==
=== Massacre of Saint Bartholomew ===
After the attempt on the life of Coligny the king came to his house to meet with him, Thoré was among the nobles who accompanied the king to assess Coligny's situation and reassure him justice would be provided. Later a request came to court from the wounded Coligny for a guard to protect his house. At Anjou's recommendation Cosseins was selected to lead the guard. Cosseins hatred of Coligny was well known and Thorė darkly remarked to the messenger who had requested the guard 'You could not have been given in guard to a worse enemy.' On the morning of the Massacre of Saint Bartholomew the prévot des marchands Claude Marcel offered a warning to Thoré to stay off the streets and hold up in his residence, if he valued his safety as it 'wasn't a good day for his house'. Thoré was in fear for his life throughout the days of massacre that unfolded in the city.

With civil war quickly following in the wake of the massacre as Protestant communities in the south withdrew their obedience to the crown, Thoré and his brother Méru were keen to earn their military reputations, and hurried to join the siege of La Rochelle.

=== Malcontent conspiracy ===
Thoré was one of the prime instigators of the Malcontent conspiracy. He and Turenne filled Alençon's head with plots and conspiracies. Rumours began to swirl at court that Alençon was in league with William the Silent. A force assembled to spirit away the princes from their house arrest at court that they had been placed under after St Bartholomew, however it was unsuccessful in its attempt. Thoré was suspected of having had a leading role in the attempt. After attempting a second time to free the princes, Thoré's arrest was decreed.

Aware of the orders for his arrest Thoré escaped into Germany in 1574 with Méru Condé heading to Strasbourg.

== Reign of Henri III ==
=== Invasion of France ===
Montmorency who had been arrested shortly after the exposure of the conspiracy despite his limited involvement remained imprisoned, as it was hoped his captivity could be used to pressure Thoré and Méru to return from Germany. However to placate Alençon and detach him from the conspiracy, it was felt it was necessary to release Montmorency from the Bastille in late 1575, removing the threat hanging over Thoré's head. Upon receipt of this news, Thoré re-entered France in October 1575 at the head of a vanguard of 2000 Reiters, descending on the region of Champagne where he was met by Guise at the head of an army of 10,000. Due to the poor financial situation of the crown Guise was forced to rely on his own funds to prepare his defences, successfully bringing him to battle at Dormans where he defeated Thoré's mercenary vanguard. The loss would not however change the tide of war, with Casimir's main force entering France in January 1576 and carving a path through Champagne. The king was compelled to agree to the Malcontents demands in the Edict of Beaulieu in May that year.

=== Later civil wars ===
In 1576 Thoré found himself in a bitter legal dispute with his former brother in law, the governor of Péronne Humières who turned to Guise for aid in their dispute. The following year as civil war once more broke out, many of the Politiques found themselves drawn away from rebellion. Thoré brought news of the Treaty of Bergerac that brought the short war to a close to Bellegarde and Méru who were about to face off in battle at Montpellier.

== Sources ==
- Baird, Henry (1880). History of the Rise of the Huguenots: Vol 2 of 2. Hodder & Stoughton.
- Carroll, Stuart (1998). Noble Power during the French Wars of Religion: The Guise Affinity and the Catholic Cause in Normandy. Cambridge University Press.
- Diefendorf, Barbara (1991). Beneath the Cross: Catholics and Huguenots in Sixteenth-Century Paris. Oxford University Press.
- Harding, Robert (1978). Anatomy of a Power Elite: the Provincial Governors in Early Modern France. Yale University Press.
- Holt, Mack (2002). The Duke of Anjou and the Politique Struggle During the Wars of Religion. Cambridge University Press.
- Salmon, J.H.M (1975). Society in Crisis: France during the Sixteenth Century. Metheun & Co.
- Sutherland, Nicola (1980). The Huguenot Struggle for Recognition. Yale University Press.
- Ward, A.W.; Prothero, G.W.; Leathes, Stanley, eds. (1911). The Cambridge Modern History. Vol. XIII. Cambridge University Press.
