= Peace of Boulogne =

The Peace of Boulogne may refer to:

- The 1550 treaty between France, England, and Scotland, to end the War of the Rough Wooing
- The 1573 Edict of Boulogne
