= François de Montmorency, 2nd Duke of Montmorency =

French soldier and diplomat (1530–1579)

François de Montmorency
- 2nd Duke of Montmorency; Marshal of France
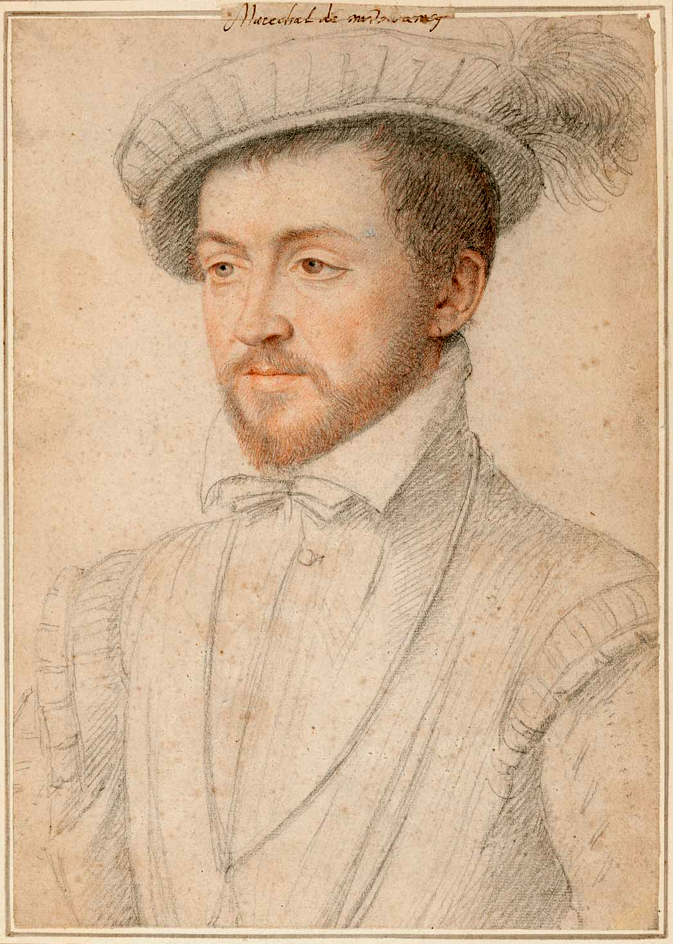
- Portrait drawing of Montmorency, school of François Clouet.
- Born: 17 July 1530; Chantilly
- Died: 6 May 1579 (aged 48); Château d'Écouen
- Noble family: Montmorency
- Spouse: Diane de France
- Father: Anne de Montmorency
- Mother: Madeleine of Savoy

François de Montmorency, 2nd Duke of Montmorency KG (17 July 1530 – 6 May 1579) was a French noble, governor, diplomat and soldier during the latter Italian Wars and the early French Wars of Religion. The son of Anne de Montmorency, favourite of the king and Madeleine of Savoy, Montmorency began his political career during the coronation of Henri II in 1547. With the resumption of the Italian Wars in 1551 he fought at the capture of Chieri, the famous defence of Metz and the defence of Thérouanne. In the latter engagement he was captured by Imperial forces, and put up for ransom. He would spend the next three years in captivity before returning to France in 1556. Returning to the conflict immediately he participated in the disastrous Saint-Quentin campaign in which the French army was destroyed and his father captured. After serving as a lieutenant in Picardie he found himself gaining advantage on the death of Henri II, the new Guise regime compensating the Montmorency family for their seizure of the grand maître title with the provision of a Marshal baton to Montmorency.

Back in 1556 on his return from captivity he had been granted the dual honour of the governorship of Île de France and that of Paris. He would hold these offices with brief interruptions until his death, building a sizeable power base in the capital. His father was disappointed to learn on his release that he had secretly arranged a marriage, and Montmorency was forced to annul the arrangement so he could marry the king's daughter Diane de France. As governor of the Île de France he exerted a moderate Catholic influence that infuriated radical elements of the city that accused him of crypto Protestantism. This was advantageous to him as the crown increasingly moved in the direction of toleration, culminating in the Edict of January which recognised the right of Protestant worship in 1562. During the early civil wars he remained loyal to the crown but represented a conciliatory position on the royal council, frequently partaking in peace talks. During the second war of religion he fought at Saint-Denis where his father was killed, leaving him as duke.

Throughout this period he feuded with the Guise, allying himself with his cousin Admiral Coligny who the Guise accused of assassinating the duke of Guise in 1563. This culminated in a showdown in his governorship when Charles, Cardinal of Lorraine, brother to the late duke attempted a show of force entry into the city, only to be repulsed in a skirmish with Montmorency's forces. Though the two sides were forced to reconcile at Moulins, Allier in 1566 the feud would continue. Montmorency was the lone voice at court in support of Coligny's plan to bring France into war with Spain. When Coligny was assassinated in Paris by the duke of Guise in the opening hours of the Massacre of Saint Bartholomew, Montmorency was absent from the city, having retired to his estates with an illness. He considered revenging himself on the Guise, until the king informed him the assassination had his blessing. In 1574 Montmorency found himself close to the king's brother Alençon at court, and was accused of involvement in an attempt on the duke of Guise's life. Leaving court, he was convinced by Charles IX to return in April, only to be implicated in a conspiracy of Alençon's, and thrown in the Bastille. His brothers escaped court and entered rebellion, however he would not be released until Alençon himself escaped court in September 1575 and his release was demanded. Weakened by his imprisonment he spent the final years of his life less involved in affairs of court, dying in 1579.

== Early life and family ==
=== Family ===
Montmorency was born in 1530, the first son of Anne de Montmorency and Madeleine of Savoy. His parents' marriage was fruitful, and they would go on to have another four sons; Henri I de Montmorency (1534-1614), Charles de Montmorency-Damville (1537-1612), Gabriel de Montmorency (1541-1562) and Guillaume de Montmorency-Thoré (1547-1593). The careers of all these brothers would be shaped by the French Wars of Religion. Anne de Montmorency was a fervent Catholic, and favourite to kings François I, who made him Constable, and Henri II. He was disappointed by his sons more moderate Catholicism, and his beloved nephew Gaspard II de Coligny's Protestantism.

=== Marriage ===
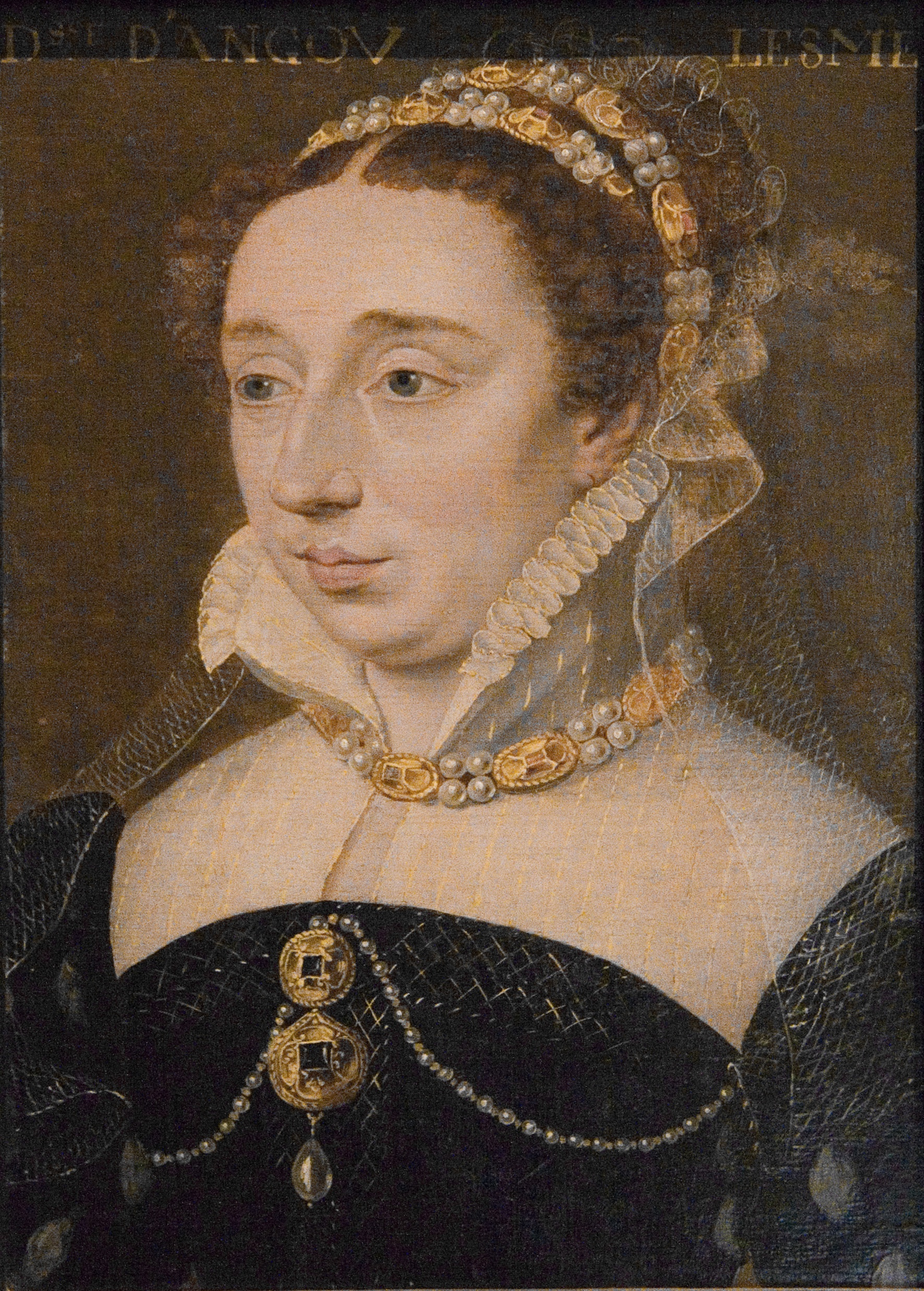
Diane de France, his wife.

After the death of the duke of Castro, the king's daughter Diane de France was once again marriagable. Constable Montmorency seeing the potential for advantage to the family, convinced the king to marry her to his son, François de Montmorency. Uninterested in the marriage selected for him, Montmorency defied his family, swearing legally binding paroles de promesse to another woman Jeanne de Piennes, one of Catherine de Medici's filles d'honneur. Upon finding out the Constable was furious, and flew into a rage, retiring to his hôtel for two weeks during which he spoke to no one. The Constable attempted to persuade Jeanne to become a nun which would release his son from their arrangement. Montmorency for his part was dispatched to Rome to get the arrangements annulled, but Pope Paul IV refused. Montmorency blamed the duke of Guise for this failure, much to the duke's dismay. Not easily defeated Constable Montmorency oversaw the passing of a law in 1557 allowing a father to disinherit a son under the age of 30 if they married without their father's consent. The law was passed with retroactive effect, so Montmorency was compelled to annul his marriage and go with his father's choice. He wrote to Jeanne releasing her from her obligations to him and urging her to do likewise for him. The Constable compensated her through an arrangement of a marriage to Alluye, a secretary of state and a gift of 40,000 livres. Montmorency and Diane were married in May 1557. The marriage would not produce any sons, as such he would be succeeded by his brother to his titles on his death.

Of moderate religious inclinations, his proclivities were complemented by his wife. She exerted a conciliatory influence on the court and supported her husbands tolerant attitude towards Protestantism.

=== Reputation ===
The contemporary historian Brantôme wrote of Montmorency: "Now, besides the fact that Monsieur de Montmorency was brave, he was a wise and shrewd captain and a strong politician, and for this, the King [Charles IX], when he went to tour his kingdom [in 1564], left him Governor of the Île de France and [Governor of] Paris, where he showed his wisdom and good leadership, because, having found the people of Paris, just emerged from civil war, still a great enemy of the Huguenots, mutinous, seditious, shaking and boiling all over, with mutiny and envy, always spilling blood, ... he rendered them supple and easy to handle like a buckskin glove from Vendôme, with which the King was greatly satisfied."

== Reign of Henri II ==
With the advent of a new king's reign, Montmorency had a part to play in the coronation at Reims. He and the other three representatives of the oldest baronies in France (Martigues, Harcourt and Thouars) travelled to the Basilica of Saint-Remi where they demanded the transportation of the sacred oils to anoint Henri be taken to the cathedral. He and the other nobles stayed in the basilica until the important oils were returned as hostages.

=== Italian Wars ===
As tensions rose in Italy between the duke of Parma and the Emperor the French began preparing to offer military support to their ally. Marshal Brissac was created governor of Piedmont and put in charge of military support. Henri dispatched military companies to assist him in the coming conflict. The flower of the French nobility joined the forces, among them the younger sons of the duke of Guise, the Bourbon-Vendôme prince's of the blood and Montmorency. In 1551 Brissac's force executed a coup with the capture of Chieri, surprising the Emperor who had expected the French to relieve Parma. For now France and the Empire were not formerly at war, both providing assistance to proxies, however this fiction would be shattered the following year.

During April 1552 Montmorency briefly campaigned in Italy, besieging the castle of Lanzo under Brissac's direction with little success. He and many of the other high ranking nobles who had flocked south in search of glory, hurried back north to join with Henri. Alongside Henri he participated in the capture of Ivoy and Damvillers. With the capture of Metz, Henri dispatched Montmorency and Villars to bring word of the army's entry into Germany to the Protestant princes with whom France was allied. After the successful defence of Metz against the Emperor, Henri was feeling confident, and lost himself in celebrations for this landmark accomplishment. He staged a grand procession in the city featuring Montmorency and his brother Damville who had assisted the duke of Guise in the defence of the city. The emperor meanwhile readied a new army and struck at Thérouanne in 1553 which held a strategic position between Calais and Flanders. After a month-long siege, the fortress at last fell to the imperial forces, who razed the settlement to the ground and captured 1000 prisoners, among them Montmorency who had been among the defenders of the city. Indeed it was Montmorency to whom the task of negotiating the surrender fell. Shortly after the destruction of Thérouanne the imperial army meted out the same fate to Hesdin. Among the casualties at Hesdin was the Duke of Castro, newly wed to the king's daughter Diane de France.

=== Ransom ===
With a ransom set at 80,000 écus, a reduction from the original 100,000 the Constable was promised that the ransom attained from the most prominent imperial prisoner the duke of Aarschot would be used to buy back his son's freedom. In May 1556 Aarschot escaped his imprisonment, infuriating Montmorency, both for the violation of aristocratic honour and the loss of revenue it represented. In July word reached the court that the Imperial captors would lower the ransom to 50,000 écus, furthering the Constables desire for peace. In August with the ransom paid, Montmorency returned to France. The Constable was at first overjoyed, until he learned of his son's marital situation.

=== Governor ===
Constable Montmorency was still keen for his son to receive the key governorship of Paris, and ensured it was earmarked for him while Montmorency was still in Imperial captivity. In 1556, Montmorency received appointment as governor of the Île de France and city of Paris. In this role he replaced his cousin Gaspard II de Coligny, who had held the post since 1551. Coligny in turn was shuffled into the governorship of Picardie. He would hold these posts largely uninterrupted until his death in 1579, the role of governor of Paris changing hands a couple of times. In 1561 Marshal Thermes was appointed as lieutenant-general of Paris, only to be replaced by Marshal Brissac in May 1562 who was in turn replaced by the future Marshal Cossé before Montmorency again assumed the role. In a further twist, during 1562 Cardinal Bourbon would hold the role of governor of Paris. Upon receiving the appointment in 1556, Montmorency was granted a large monetary gift by the town council of Paris. He made his entrance to the hôtel de ville with a retinue of 200 nobles.

=== Return to the fight ===
With Guise's campaign into Italy in January 1557, Montmorency accompanied him, bringing his company with him. In the wake of the disastrous battle of Saint-Quentin in which much of the French army was destroyed and Montmorency's father the Constable captured, Montmorency was among the captains that led the remnants of the French army to safety, having fought in the engagement himself but avoided capture. He and Bourdillon led two cannons from the field, rendezvousing with the Prince of Condé and François I, Duke of Nevers at La Fère. Montmorency was dispatched to Amiens as a special lieutenant. This gave him military authority over the border region during the crisis now consuming the kingdom. The king's orders to the governor of Péronne made it clear that this appointment allowed him to act as the de facto governor of Picardie. Meanwhile the Constable's enemy, the Guise family, free of their rival led the war effort from Paris, achieving a counter stroke with the capture of Calais, which had resisted French control for 200 years. By May 1558, the triumphant Guise secured Montmorency's replacement with Claude, Duke of Aumale in Picardie. With the return from captivity of the Constable in 1558, the Guise were pushed once more from the limelight by the king's favourite. The duke of Guise, resentful about his loss of authority, lashed out uncharacteristically, challenging Montmorency to a duel over a perceived slight. Montmorency protested that he had done nothing to dishonour the Guise, and reported what had transpired to the king and Constable. The king was annoyed at Guise's behaviour, while the Constable laughed it off, recognising it as being a sign of political desperation.

== Reign of François II ==
=== Grand Maître ===
Upon the sudden death of Henri II, a palace revolution quickly followed. The Guise, utilising their relationship as uncles to the new queen of France asserted their dominance over the crown. Their ascendency came at the expense of Henri II's favourite the Constable. To this end the office of grand maître, which the Constable had hoped to provide to his son was usurped for the duke of Guise. The Guise could not however afford to totally alienate such a powerful magnate, as such to compensate the family for the seizure of this post, the Constable's first son was granted the Marshal baton.

=== Conspiracy of Amboise ===
In the wake of the Conspiracy of Amboise, in which Protestants attempted to seize the king and kill his advisers, Montmorency and his father quickly hurried to Paris. This was both to ensure the city was calm and that there was no potential for subversion related to the conspiracy to unfold in the city. The gates were closed, regular guards were reinforced and searches undertaken. Those who were not resident to the capital had to provide reasons for their presence or depart in 24 hours.

In August 1560, he participated in an Assembly of Notables summoned by the Guise in response to both the religious crisis that was engulfing the kingdom and the financial problems which had been left by Henri II. The assembly agreed that the religious question would be left to a general assembly of the church, while the financial question would be dealt with by an Estates General, who would consider a package of reforms.

== Reign of Charles IX ==
As early as 1561 Montmorency had acquired a reputation for moderate Catholicism. The English ambassador reported that he was 'said not to be against our religion'. He remonstrated with his father in April 1561 when the Constable reconciled with the duke of Guise in the form of an informal alliance against Protestantism, urging his father not to abandon nobles who were reliable friends of the family for a relationship with his bitterest rival. In May 1561 the English ambassador reported that Montmorency had absented himself from Charles' sacre as he would not partake in Mass.

=== Edict of January ===
The crown increasingly moved towards religious toleration in the early years of Charles IX. This culminated in the Edict of January in 1562, which for the first time granted official toleration to the presence of two faiths in France. This explosive edict was expected to receive strong opposition from the Parlement which would have to register it before it became law. As such Montmorency and Navarre were dispatched to the Parlement to order them to register it immediately and without the traditional process of remonstrance. The Parlement ignored their demands, and instead insisted on receiving physical copies so they could review the text and prepare their response. Montmorency oversaw the printing of them and by the following week they were in the hands of Parlementaires. This did not please the leading présidents on the court however which wanted to distribute them itself. Several councillors came to the Marshal to demand that the entire output be handed over to them. Their displeasure at how the situation had unfolded would be reflected in the remonstrances they raised in February. Finally on 6 March they registered the edict. In the final days before the edict's registration, bands of students began to riot in the Palais de Justice, demanding the edict be published on threat of seizing churches for themselves. Montmorency reported that thousands of armed men were threatening the city, and that to avert serious disturbance, the Parlement should register the edict post-haste.

In January 1563 a powder reserve in one of Paris' arsenals detonated. Militant Catholics in the city blamed the Protestants for having sabotaged the powder supply. The nucleus of a riot began to formulate, with violence being meted out to those Protestants suspected of responsibility. Montmorency, the prévôt des marchands and other authorities hurried to the scene, to contain the crowds. However despite their efforts, several would be killed in the coming days. Catherine voiced her considerable displeasure about the chaotic situation in the capital, advising Montmorency on 8 February to bring more troops into the capital to contain the populace.

=== Peace of Amboise ===
As a term of the Peace of Amboise, the Protestants were granted one site of worship per baillage. The court was keen that these sites would be selected in small out of the way locations away from population centres. To this end Catherine instructed Montmorency to relocate the site in Senlis, away from Pontoise and towards a more obscure location. As governor of the Île de France, Montmorency was responsible for all sites of worship in the various bailli of the region. To ensure that the terms were abided by across France, a commissioner system was established by the crown, with several commissioners responsible for each region of France. There were concerns however that these commissioners would struggle to assert their authority over local interests. To this end the three Marshals, Bourdillon, Vielleville and Montmorency were assigned super regions in which they were to reinforce the commissioners' authority. Montmorency was given the region of his governorship, Picardie, Normandie, Champagne, Orléans and Berry. He began his enforcement responsibilities with a visit to Picardie. Having arrived, he ensured that the king's majority was recognised, and that towns abided by the recent edicts. He further held responsibility for the disarmament of the populace, excluding border towns. This appointment risked overstretching Montmorency, who already had a consuming task keeping his governorship in order.

=== Royal tour ===
Conscious that the state of peace was still very fragile, Catherine decided in 1564, that the court would tour France with the dual purpose of enforcing the young king's authority on the independent minded magnates of the provinces, and ensuring that the terms of the peace were abided by. Catherine feared however that the court's absence from the capital could lead to dangerous developments in the city. To this end she began a regular stream of correspondence with Montmorency. In total during the court's travels across France she would send 74 letters to him. Her concern proved to be justified, as the feud between the Guise and Montmorency heated up in the city while the court was in Languedoc. Montmorency's open partisanship with Coligny and his faction during this period was of considerable distress to the court. From their travels Catherine wrote to him urging all nobles who were not in the household of residents to be retired from the city. Montmorency, unwilling to dilute the heavy retinue of followers he enjoyed in Paris complained to her that she was interfering with his authority. She shot back that Lansac and de Garde would enforce the royal will if he wouldn't.

=== Feud ===
While he had been in opposition to his cousin during the first war of religion, with the coming of peace Montmorency reconciled with Admiral Coligny. This set him up for a confrontation with the house of Guise, who blamed Coligny for the assassination of the duke of Guise in the closing days of the first war. Both he and his father, who was militantly Catholic defended his cousin at court from the accusations of the Guise family who wanted an investigation opened into Coligny. Both justified their defence of their Protestant kinsmen as a family matter that was unconnected from religion. To this end Charles, Cardinal of Lorraine, brother of the late duke aimed to make a show of force entry into Paris with an armed retinue, hoping that this could provide advantage after the failure to pursue their case against the Admiral through legal channels. Montmorency refused the Cardinal entry to the city under arms. While Lorraine technically had a royal permit to travel with an armed escort he refused to show it to Montmorency, making his entry illegal. Therefore ignoring the prohibition Lorraine and his retinue entered the city through the porte Saint-Denis, and came out worse in a skirmish near St Innocents with Montmorency's forces. Montmorency was supported by the Protestant prince Porcien in the engagement. Meanwhile Aumale entered the city via another gate without opposition. Lorraine for his part was forced to retreat to the Hôtel de Cluny with Aumale, where they were besieged by mocking Parisians who he had hoped would flock to his banner upon his entry into the capital. During the skirmish, one of Lorraine's men had been killed. A few days after this humiliation they quietly slipped out of the city. Coligny meanwhile arrived in Paris on 22 January to offer his support to the Marshal accompanied by 70 gentleman. Montmorency defended his calling on Coligny in front of the Paris Parlement saying that the Admiral brought the support of the 'reformed religion' which was useful against his enemies the Guise. In January 1566, while the court was resident at Moulins Catherine engineered a forceful reconciliation between the Guise and Coligny, and of that between the Guise and Marshal Montmorency, the most forthright defender of Coligny in the Montmorency family. Coligny and Lorraine were forced to exchange the kiss of peace, in theory settling their feud. Nevertheless this did little but paper over the hatred between the two parties, and when the Duke of Guise arrived at court, the Constable and Montmorency made their excuses and departed.

In early 1567, the continued subversions of the peace of Amboise by the Protestants of Paris, was wearing thin on Catherine, who was conscious that militant Catholics were keen to engage in more violence in the city. She urged Montmorency to instruct the Protestants of the city to 'live more modestly'. Montmorency's warning had little effect, and the illegal services, marriages and baptisms continued in the city. As the Constable increasingly aged, he planned for the succession of his titles, hoping to impart the office of Constable to his son. This was a frustration to Louis I, Prince of Condé who coveted the office for himself. The ambitions of the leading Protestant nobles in combination with the inflammatory policy of the Spanish in crushing the Protestants of the Spanish Netherlands drove them into rebellion once more, striking upon a plan to seize the king at Meaux.

=== Second civil war ===
After the failure of the Surprise of Meaux, the Protestant army that had intended to capture the king pursued him and the court as they fled to Paris. Unable to catch him on the road, Condé established a siege of the capital. Inside the city the situation was tense, as first fears of Protestants storming the city and then fears of starving during a siege drove much of the population into a fury. Some militant Catholics accused Montmorency and his father the Constable of treason in favour of the Protestants after the fall of Charenton-le-Pont to Condé's army. It was rumoured that Montmorency had told the garrison to capitulate. Indeed both the Constable and Montmorency were involved in negotiations with their cousin and other representatives of the Protestants in October, however these broke down with the Constable angrily quarrelling with Coligny. The threat of a riot in Paris pushed the Montmorencys into action, and on 10 November Constable Montmorency led an army out to break the siege, which they successfully did with a victory at Saint-Denis, though the Constable was killed during the battle. After the death of the Constable it was Montmorency who led the royal army to victory. In January 1568 Montmorency was again among the commissioners who sought to bring the war to a close, but they failed to arrive at terms. The second war was brought to a close with the Peace of Longjumeau in March of that year, the commissioners having at last succeeded in their efforts. One of the terms of the peace was that the crown would pay off the Protestant mercenaries that had been hired by Condé. To this end money was appropriated from the royal treasury, and Montmorency and the duke of Longueville went as security for the remainder of the sum which was to be provided by Cardinal Bourbon.

=== Third civil war ===
In May 1568 a royal council discussed how best to ensure this peace was preserved. Montmorency argued that what was necessary was for nobles to remain under arms, while a disarming of the populace of towns was undertaken. At the same time discussions were occurring concerning a new head of the army, due to the present vacancy of the office of Constable. Catherine determined that no longer would the office be dominated by powerful magnates, and that instead the king's brother Anjou would serve as the kingdom's lieutenant general while the office would be left vacant. Montmorency, his brother Damville and Vielleville opposed this plan, as the young Anjou was currently representing the most extreme Catholic faction at court. To break the militant hold on the young prince, Montmorency desired that he be married to Elizabeth I. At another council meeting in September 1568, a discussion about the prospect of accepting the Pope's offer of financial relief to the financially beleaguered kingdom in return for resuming a war against heresy was discussed. The tenor of the debate became heated as Michel de l'Hôpital, chancellor of France, and Lorraine sparred over the matter, Lorraine angrily denouncing Hôpital as a Protestant. Montmorency had to intervene between the two as Lorraine grabbed the elderly Hôpital's beard and threatened to assault him. The debate settled in the war parties' favour. France once more descended into civil war, however the three marshals refused to serve in the conflict.

In November 1568, Montmorency summoned the captains of the city militia to him, to explain their recent actions, which included organising book burnings and harassing Protestants in their homes. Montmorency chided them and warned that if they did not get into line with royal policy, the king would station royal troops in the capital instead. The captains rejected this threat, ominously warning Montmorency that if the captain of a ship would not do what needed to be done, the pilots would put their hands on the helm. During the third civil war Montmorency acted as an intermediary for negotiations between his kinsmen Coligny and the royal court, in the hopes of reaching a peace settlement. By this time he had a reputation in court as a member of a middle party, that would in future be termed politique, which prioritised the stability of the state over religious disputes. Radical Catholics blamed Montmorency, and Morvillier for the generous peace that brought the third war of a religion to a close, with Blaise de Monluc decrying 'we defeated them over and over, yet despite that they had such good credit on the king's council that the edicts were always favourable to them'.

=== Saint-Germain-en-Laye ===
As a term of the Peace of Saint-Germain-en-Laye, monuments, such as the Gastines Cross, which had been elevated to commemorate the killing of the Protestant Gastines family, had to be torn down. Montmorency was to oversee the removal of this monument, which was beloved by many of the militant Catholics of the city. The radical preacher Simon Vigor was among three delegates who travelled to Montmorency to petition him for the maintenance of the memorial. Popular opinion became increasingly violent, culminating in a riot in December 1571 in favour of its preservation. Montmorency oversaw the crushing of the unrest, furthering the hatred the militant Catholic population had for him, characterising him as a crypto-Protestant. He had one of the rioters hung and others prosecuted. Montmorency warned the king that his enemies the Guise were stockpiling weapons in the city, however nothing came of this. With anti-Protestant violence crushed under his authority in Paris, militant Parisians turned their attention to sectarian violence against Italians and 'witches', with a riot against the former's presence in the capital in June 1572. The 1570 peace had also secured his temporary ascendency at court, at the expense of the Guise who were disgraced. In July 1570 he won a battle of precedence in the court with Charles, Duke of Mayenne.

During 1571, violence erupted in Rouen after a Protestant congregation failed to remove their hats as the host passed them, leaving 40 dead. Montmorency took charge of bringing royal justice to bear, during which he condemned 66 to death and levied fines on others. This further cemented the hatred many Catholics had for him.

In July 1572 Montmorency was dispatched as a diplomat to England, his reputation as someone who would tolerate Protestantism making him an obvious choice for the king to have sign the Treaty of Blois which created an Anglo-French alliance. While this delighted Coligny, who saw it as the first step towards war with Spain, no further moves towards war would be taken. Montmorency too shared the desire for a return to war against Spain, recruiting soldiers for the effort with Coligny in early August 1572 but the council was in otherwise unanimous opposition.

=== Massacre of Saint Bartholomew ===
Having attended the wedding of Navarre and Marguerite of Valois, intended as a security for the 1570 peace, Montmorency quickly departed the city, leaving two days after the event on 20 August. His reason for leaving has been ascribed both to illness and fear of a plot against his family. He advised Coligny to leave the city with him, but he had business to attend to with the king and tarried. On 22 August an assassin made an attempt on Coligny's life, leaving the situation in the capital explosive and without the presence of the governor to assert control over the situation and suppress disorder as he had in 1571.

With the royal council drawing up kill lists to sever the head of the Protestant leadership on 23 August, rumours would later swirl that Montmorency's name had been floated for inclusion among the executions. However, if true, it was removed. Upon the Assassination of Admiral Coligny in the opening hours of the Massacre of Saint Bartholomew, Montmorency, absent from the city, was furious to hear of the killing of one of his kin. Back in 1570, he had promised the king that he would pursue vengeance if any harm came to his cousin. He renewed this vow on condition the king himself did not claim responsibility for the murder. The king initially blamed a private quarrel between Guise and the Châtillon for the killing before altering his story to assert that it had been his orders. No longer subject to the obligations of aristocratic honour to strike back in his feud, Montmorency resolved to remain loyal to the king. While staying at Senlis, he exerted his influence to prevent an expansion of the massacre that was unfolding in Paris. He took charge of Coligny's body once he had acquired it from where it lay in Paris, ensuring that it received burial.

The following year, Montmorency participated in the siege of La Rochelle. The city had gone into rebellion following the massacre, Montmorency fought with the royal army in suppressing the city. The siege and war would ultimately be brought to an end by the king's brother Anjou's election as king of the Commonwealth. Upon returning to court in December 1573, the duke of Guise showed his displeasure by promptly retiring.

=== Malcontents ===
During January 1574, with the support of Montmorency, who was becoming a close friend, Charles IX promised the office of lieutenant-general to Alençon. In February, while the court was resident at Montmorency's residence, the Château de Chantilly, the Duke of Guise accused Montmorency of having hired the sieur de Ventabren to have him assassinated. Montmorency and Ventabren denied the charge, however Montmorency no longer feeling welcome at court departed. His withdrawal removed a moderating influence on the opposition to the Guise at court. With his absence, Charles retracted the offer of the lieutenant-generalship to Alençon, granting it to a cousin of the Guise the duke of Lorraine. In response Alençon began plotting. On 27 February a Protestant force was seen in the vicinity of the court, and while it was dispersed accusations were levelled at the ambitious Alençon and Navarre as the ringleaders of this attempt on the court. The Papal Nuncio believed Montmorency was aware of the conspiracy, but had chosen not to involve himself. Alençon and Navarre meanwhile denied the charges but were kept under watch at court which retreated to Vincennes. In April Charles managed to coax Montmorency into returning to court. Shortly thereafter upon hearing of another escape attempt involving Alençon and Navarre Montmorency was placed under arrest. The nobles La Mole and Coconas, who had planned the escape were interrogated, Coconas confessed that the Montmorencies were behind the attempt, and that Alençon was to link up with the rebel prince Condé in Germany. When a false rumour reached the court that Damville, governor of Languedoc and brother of Montmorency had been captured, Montmorency and Marshal Cossé were transferred to the Bastille on 4 May. Upon learning of Damville's survival, he was dispossed of his governate in favour of the Dauphin Montpensier.

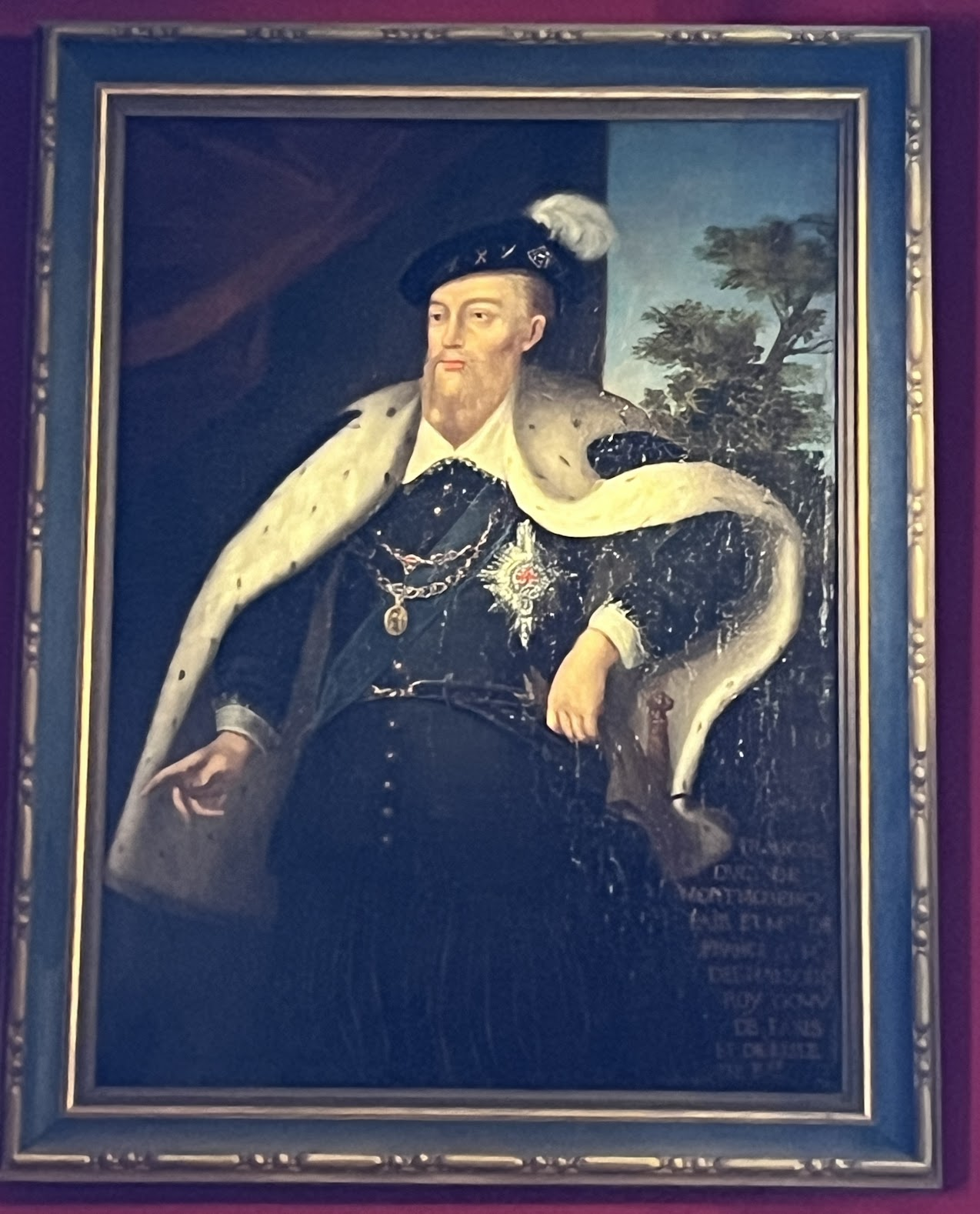
Francois de Montmorency, 2nd Duke of Montmorency - made Knight of the Garter in 1572 - in the Château de Bourdeilles, Dordogne, Nouvelle-Aquitaine, France.

Montmorency's other brothers Méru and Thoré, who were more open about their rebellious desires meanwhile escaped into Germany, where they raised a mercenary army alongside Condé. The court hoped that the captivity of their brother would prevent them from crossing the border and invading France with the threat of execution.

== Reign of Henri III ==
=== Damville ===
With the death of Charles in May 1574, Anjou hurried back from the Commonwealth to take the French throne, assuming the regnal name of Henri III. On route, he held an interview with Damville in Turin, warmly receiving the magnate and listening to his grievances about the treatment of Protestants. Henri restored Damville to his governate, and proposed a more limited toleration of Protestantism. As far as Damville's complaints about the captivity of his brother, Henri promised to consider their situation upon his arrival in Paris. Having reached Paris Henri refused Damville's request to release his brother. Damville accused Henri of trying to murder his brother in his cell.

In February 1575 during negotiations to end the civil war, the Protestant deputies negotiating with the crown demanded the release of Montmorency and Cossé. More politically dangerous than the renegade Montmorency brothers was the flight from his imprisonment at court of Alençon in September 1575. As a brother to the king his presence among the rebels presented a serious threat to the court. Among his many demands he listed the release of Montmorency and Cossé, a demand that was met on 2 October, the court desperate to re-secure his loyalty. In response the Montmorency brothers, once more granted freedom to manoeuvrer invaded France.

=== Peace of Monsieur ===
As a term of the Peace of Monsieur which brought the war to a close in May 1576, Montmorency and Cossé were restored the honours they had been stripped of upon their detainment. The edict's terms were read out to the court in his presence. The presence of Catholics on both sides of the fifth war of religion including the Montmorency family, had stripped the conflict of much of its confessional character as it devolved more openly into a battle for supremacy at court between political factions.

=== Death ===
Though restored to his honours, Montmorency found his influence at court did not recover from his family's involvement in the Malcontent plots of 1574-5. Moreover he found himself worn and aged by his imprisonment. In March 1579 he was entrusted by Henri as a special commissioner alongside Pomponne de Bellièvre to impress the king's demands for more money on a special session of the Estates. Upon the death of Montmorency on 6 May 1579, his brother Damville became duke of Montmorency. Damville found himself burdened by his brothers considerable debts, Montmorency having accumulated 110,000 livres in debts during his life.

== Sources ==
- Baird, Henry (1880). History of the Rise of the Huguenots: Vol 2 of 2. Hodder & Stoughton.
- Baumgartner, Frederic (1988). Henry II: King of France 1547–1559. Duke University Press.
- Carroll, Stuart (2005). Noble Power during the French Wars of Religion: The Guise Affinity and the Catholic Cause in Normandy. Cambridge University Press.
- Carroll, Stuart (2009). Martyrs and Murderers: The Guise Family and the Making of Europe. Oxford University Press.
- Cloulas, Ivan (1985). Henri II. Fayard.
- Diefendorf, Barbara (1991). Beneath the Cross: Catholics and Huguenots in Sixteenth Century Paris. Oxford University Press.
- Durot, Éric (2012). François de Lorraine, duc de Guise entre Dieu et le Roi. Classiques Garnier.
- Broomhall, Susan (2019). "Corresponding romances: Henri II and the last campaigns of the Italian Wars". In Downes, Stephanie; Lynch, Andrew; O'Loughlin, Katrina (eds.). Writing War in Britain and France, 1370–1854: A History of Emotions. Routledge.
- Harding, Robert (1978). Anatomy of a Power Elite: the Provincial Governors in Early Modern France. Yale University Press.
- Holt, Mack P. (2002). The Duke of Anjou and the Politique Struggle During the Wars of Religion. Cambridge University Press.
- Jouanna, Arlette (1998). Histoire et Dictionnaire des Guerres de Religion. Bouquins.
- Jouanna, Arlette (2007). The St Bartholomew's Day Massacre: The Mysteries of a Crime of State. Manchester University Press.
- Knecht, R. J. (2010). The French Wars of Religion 1559–1598 (3rd ed.). Routledge.
- Knecht, Robert (2014). Catherine de' Medici. Routledge.
- Knecht, Robert (2016). Hero or Tyrant? Henry III, King of France, 1574-1589. Routledge.
- Lanza, Janine M (2007). From Wives to Widows in Early Modern Paris: Gender, Economy, and Law. Ashgate Publishing.
- Potter, David (1993). War and Government in the French Provinces: Picardy 1470-1560. Cambridge University Press.
- Roberts, Penny (2013). Peace and Authority during the French Religious Wars c.1560-1600. Palgrave Macmillan.
- Roelker, Nancy (1996). One King, One Faith: The Parlement of Paris and the Religious Reformation of the Sixteenth Century. University of California Press.
- Salmon, J.H.M (1975). Society in Crisis: France during the Sixteenth Century. Metheun & Co.
- Shimizu, J. (1970). Conflict of Loyalties: Politics and Religion in the Career of Gaspard de Coligny, Admiral of France, 1519–1572. Geneva: Librairie Droz.
- Sutherland, Nicola (1962). The French Secretaries of State in the Age of Catherine de Medici. The Athlone Press.
- Sutherland, Nicola (1980). The Huguenot Struggle for Recognition. Yale University Press.
- Thompson, James (1909). The Wars of Religion in France 1559-1576: The Huguenots, Catherine de Medici and Philip II. Chicago University Press.
- Vindry, Fleury (1901). Dictionnaire de l'état-major français au XVIe siècle (in French). Castanet. p. 349.
- Ward, A.W.; Prothero, G.W.; Leathes, Stanley, eds. (1934). The Cambridge Modern History. Cambridge University Press.

French nobility
Preceded by Anne	Duke of Montmorency	Succeeded by Henri I
