= Siege of Sancerre =

1572 siege

- Part of French Wars of Religion
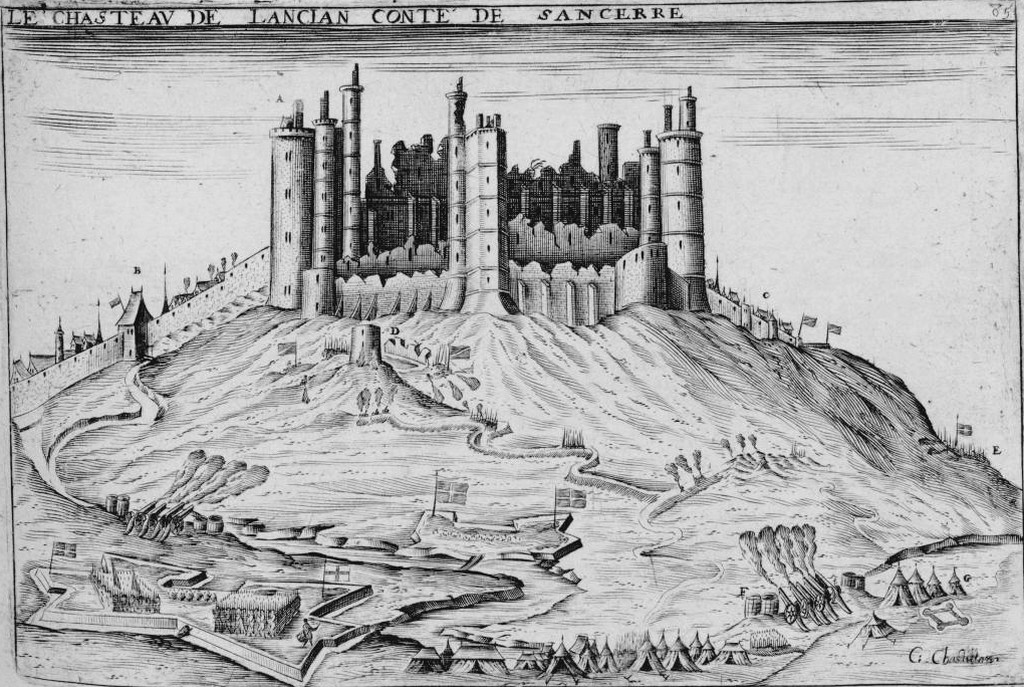
- Siege de Sancerre, early 17th century print by Claude Chastillon.
Date	9 November 1572 – 25 August 1573
Location	Sancerre, France 47.332°N 2.840°E
Result	Catholic victory by famine

Belligerents
Kingdom of France	French Huguenot forces

Commanders and leaders
Claude de La Châtre	Mayor Johnanneau; Captain Lafleur

Strength
7,000	2,400

Casualties and losses
600	84 combatants 500 famine deaths

The siege of Sancerre (1572–1573) was a siege of the fortified hilltop city of Sancerre in central France during the Wars of Religion where the Huguenot population held out for nearly eight months against the Catholic forces of the king.

== Background ==
In 1529, John Calvin followed Protestant Reformer Melchior Wolmar to Bourges to continue his law studies under Andrea Alciati, an Italian who had been invited by Francis I to teach in France. Calvin's ideas became popular in Bourges and the doctrine of the Reformation spread throughout the region and France. Calvinism became influential in Sancerre in 1540. After the Conspiracy of Amboise and Massacre (1560), many Huguenots took refuge in Sancerre, which became, along with Nîmes, Montauban, and La Rochelle, one of the principal cities of the Reformation in France.

In May 1562, Gabriel, comte de Montgomery, the Huguenot captain, captured Bourges during the First Civil War and raided churches and monasteries. The Catholics counter-attacked with reprisals and the campaign spread. Sancerre, spared during the first round of the conflict, was attacked in 1564 by Count Sciarra Martinengo, a Venetian, who was governor of Orléans, and Claude de La Châtre, governor of the Berry. Lacking bombard artillery, but armed with slings (trebuchet), the hilltop city withstood the attack for five weeks until Martinengo and La Châtre withdrew, finding the rebellious fortress too difficult to capture. Another attack against Sancerre was tried in 1568, but the troops were forced to withdraw when confronted by the garrison.

== Siege ==
Following the St. Bartholomew's Day Massacre on 24 August 1572, many Protestants fled to the hilltop stronghold. When Sancerre refused to receive the royal garrison of Charles IX, Honorat de Bueil, seigneur de Racan ordered a surprise attack on the city on 9 November 1572. The city was occupied by the forces of the Seigneur of Racan, but the Huguenots, under Mayor Johnanneau and Captain Lafleur, were able to regain control of the fortress after an armed resistance lasting 17 hours.

After massing a large army of 7,000 men, Claude de La Châtre, who was later Marshal of France, led a second full-scale offensive against the fortress on 19 March 1573. The arsenal of weapons included bombards, arrows, lances, stones, and oil. The siege was one of the last times in European history when slings (trebuchet), the Arquebuses of Sancerre, were used in warfare. Greatly outnumbered and fearing genocide, the Sancerrois taunted their attackers, "We light here, We fight here; go and assassinate elsewhere." The Catholic forces, armed with 18 guns, bombarded the 400-year-old ramparts until the wall collapsed on the attackers, killing 600 men. After the assault failed, La Châtre withdrew to Saint Satur and a blockade was started.

The city suffered terrible famine and the population was reduced to eating rats, leather, and ground slate. There were even isolated reports of cannibalism. Some 500 people, including most of the children, died.

The siege was compared to the siege of Jerusalem and became a Protestant cause throughout Europe. Poland offered to elect Henri, Duke of Anjou, Queen Catherine de' Medici's fourth son, to the throne of Poland with the understanding that France would ameliorate the Huguenots.

The Duke of Anjou was fighting at La Rochelle (see Siege of La Rochelle (1572–1573)) when he received word that he had been elected King of Poland. The announcement gave the Duke a pretext to abandon the losing siege, which had been repulsed 29 times in four months and decimated the principal army of France. On 6 June 1573, Charles IX signed the Peace of La Rochelle ending the Fourth Civil War and guaranteeing French Protestants religious freedom.

On 25 August 1573, one day after the anniversary of the Saint Bartholomew's Day Massacre, the last of the siege of Sancerre survivors left the fortress. Châtre entered the empty city on 31 August and commanded the peasantry from the surrounding areas to demolish the ramparts. In payment of damages and taxes for the siege, King Charles IX accepted 2,000 litres of wine as compensation, taken from the caves of Sancerre.

The siege of Sancerre was documented by a Protestant minister Jean de Léry, who survived the battle, in The Memorable History of the Siege of Sancerre (1574).

== Aftermath ==
During the League Period (1576–1594), the province of Berry saw more religious conflicts. Bourges, Vierzon, and Mehun sided with the League, while Sancerre, now greatly diminished, and the aristocracy of the county supported the king. The fighting ended after Protestant Henri de Navarre was crowned King of France in 1594.

The medieval Chateau de Sancerre was destroyed in 1621 to prevent further resistance. The great tower, the Tour des Fiefs, was spared, but only after its structural supports were broken by methodical artillery fire.

== See also ==
- List of incidents of cannibalism

== Bibliography ==
- Jean de Léry, The Memorable History of the Siege of Sancerre (1574).
