= Artus de Cossé =

French politician (1512–1582)

- Seigneur de Gonnor
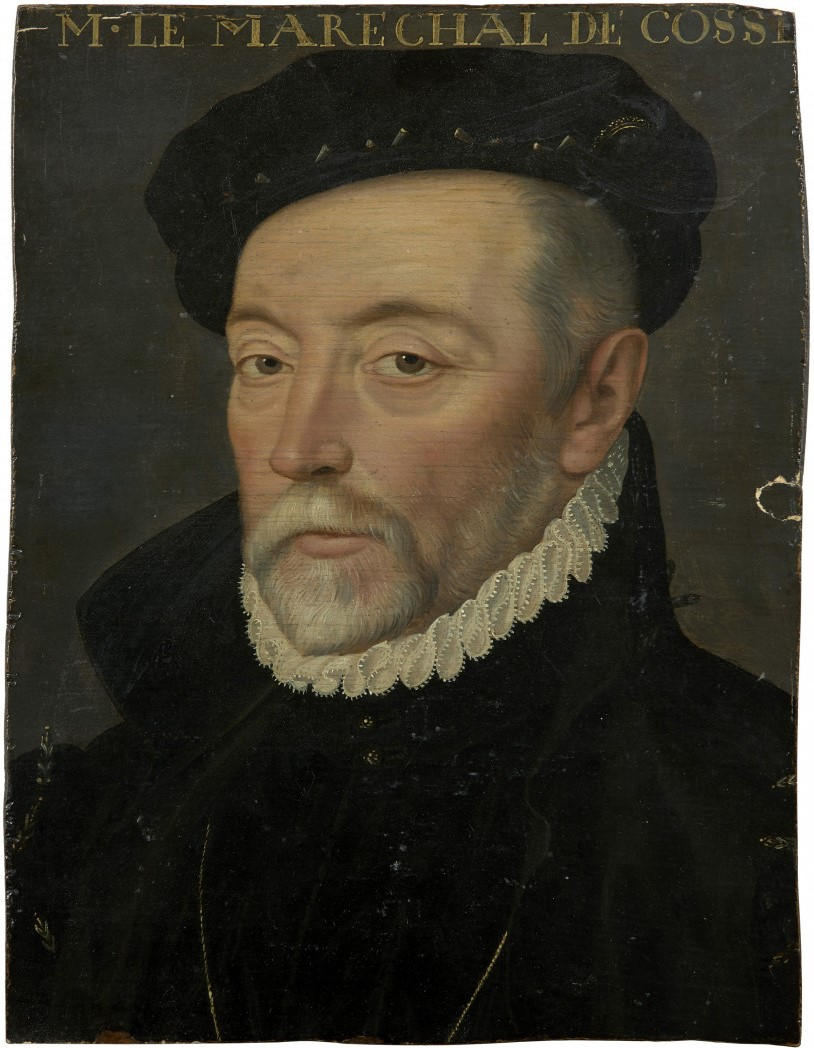
- Other titles: Marshal of France Comte de Secondigny
- Born: January 1512
- Died: February 1582 (aged 70); Château de Gonnord, Kingdom of France
- Family: Maison de Cossé-Brissac
- Father: René de Cosse-Brissac
- Mother: Charlotte Gouffier de Boisy

Artus de Cossé, seigneur de Gonnor and Comte de Secondigny (1512–1582), was a Marshal of France, an office he was elevated to in 1567. He served to administer the armies finances during the first of the French Wars of Religion and would lead the royal army in its pursuit of the Prince of Condé during the second civil war. His failure to catch the army led to his dismissal from overall royal command. During the third civil war he would again lead troops, beating a small Protestant force, before being defeated in the final days of the war at Arney-le-Duc. His long history of Politique leanings would push him into the orbit of the Malcontents for which he would be arrested in 1574. In 1576 he would be released and restored to favour before he died in 1582.

== Family and early life ==
The Cossé family was ennobled in the fourteenth century. Artus de Cossé was the brother of the Marshal Brissac who had been elevated to the title during the reign of Henri II of France, he would predecease Cossé, dying in 1563. The two boys had been raised in the royal household at Blois, as their father, René de Cossé and mother Charlotte Gouffier de Boisy were governors for the royal children of François I. As such the two were enfants d'honneur.

== Reign of Henri II ==
Cossé fell into the orbit of Anne de Montmorency as a client after his former childhood playmate had become king. When Metz was taken by the French in 1552, the king wanted to appoint Marshal Vielleville as its governor, but Montmorency strongly objected, and proposed Cossé. The king conceded to this choice. Frustrated by his defeat at Metz the emperor struck back the following year, in April 1553 his army razed Thérouanne. In the wake of this embarrassment, the duke of Guise was able to leverage the disfavour Montmorency fell into to have Cossé replaced with Vielleville as governor of Metz.

== Reign of Charles IX ==
=== First civil war ===
In 1562, Cossé was responsible for the financial administration of the army. In late 1562 he received the role of lieutenant general of the city of Paris, succeeding his brother who had previously been given the role in May 1562. In this role he coordinated defence of the city and connected the royal administration with the Parlement. Catherine de'Medici wrote to him later in the year, complaining that the veteran infantry in Calais had not been paid for months. His brother Brissac likewise complained for funds concerning his troops in Rouen. After the first civil war had concluded, in 1564, Cossé was appointed to the finance office of surintendant-général des finances the chief post for the financial administration of the kingdom. In this capacity he would attempt to introduce a tax on weddings and baptisms, however this move would be blocked by the Parlement.

=== Second civil war ===
As the peace deteriorated, rumours reached court in September that Protestant cavalry was assembling near Montargis, Catherine instructed Cossé to investigate the matter and report back to her. Shortly thereafter the Protestant nobility would execute the Surprise of Meaux, utilising the assembled cavalry in an attempt to seize the king, however this would be a failure. Following this, the rebel attempt to besiege Paris to where the king had fled, however this would be dealt a blow in the battle of Saint-Denis. The remnants of Condé's army retreating over the French border to regroup. Cossé was tasked with leading the army to intercept him and his failure to successfully do so, combined with his suspected Protestant leanings led to his dismissal from army command by Catherine in favour of Marshal Tavannes.

With peace established in early 1568 Cossé would be responsible for monitoring the frontier, which many Huguenot nobles were attempting to cross in the wake of Alva's operations in the Spanish Netherlands. Refugee nobles found much support among the Protestant nobility in Picardy, and attempted to re-enter the Netherlands under arms in July under the captains Mouvans and Cocqueville. Cossé was able to intercept and destroy this attempted border crossing. Cossé had Cocqueville summarily executed, while Catherine instructed him to hand the Flemish prisoners over to Alva, while the French prisoners would be sent to the galleys. Alongside these military actions, Cossé was instructed to locate Condé so as to instruct him to ensure the terms of peace would be obeyed in Orléans and Blois.

=== Third civil war ===
As a man of politique leanings, when informed of the plan to arrest the Huguenot leadership and revoke the Peace of Longjumeau that had ended the second civil war, he was hesitant to enforce the orders. Once formal civil war had resumed however, he would serve the crown loyally, first assisting with 15 companies of men-at-arms and 2000 footmen in the effort to guard the frontier in Picardy from penetration by Prince of Orange. This would be a failure, and he would enter France in December 1568. Nevertheless in this capacity he would be responsible for handing over several prisoners to the Duke of Alba for punishment. He would then move south, fighting alongside the Duke of Montpensier, successfully crushing the viscounts of Quercy and Languedoc when they sought to reach junction with the army under the Prince of Condé in Périgord. In October 1569, Cossé's forces were present at the decisive Battle of Moncontour and played a critical role in the crowns victory. After the destruction of the Protestant army Cossė was among those advocating for the king to seize the moment to gain a favourable peace, the crown was however uninterested, and set about sieging St. Jean-d'Angély in what would prove a costly battle of attrition. As the siege dragged on with little progress, the king reconsidered the proposal, and Cossé was sent with de Losses to meet with Jeanne d'Albret in La Rochelle to talk terms, however she was uninterested. In early 1570, Cossé was tasked with seizing the strategic city of La Charité, to deny the Huguenots their primary means of communication across the Loire river. As Coligny marched on Paris in the final months of the war, Cossé's army would be defeated during their attempt to intercept him at the Battle of Arnay-le-Duc in June.

In 1570 he was established as the governor of Touraine, replacing the prince dauphin.

=== St Bartholomew and its aftermath ===
With peace declared in 1570, France entered a period of uneasy co-existence between Protestantism and Catholicism. Coligny, who had become the military leader of the Protestant rebels was hesitant to return to court, demanding many assurances for his safety before he would assent, when at last he was prepared to return, Cossé escorted him from his stronghold in La Rochelle to the capital. As part of the peace a marriage was arranged between Navarre and Margaret of Valois for which the leading nobility assembled in Paris. After the wedding, an assassin wounded Coligny, in the heated atmosphere of recriminations after the attempt, it was decided to liquidate the Protestant leadership in a lightning strike. The attempted assassinations would however slip out of the control of their perpetrators into a general massacre, leaving the politique Cossé in great fear for his life as Catholics considered soft on Protestantism were also targeted.

Having survived the massacre, in 1574 he would find himself involved in the conspiracy of the Malcontents against the crown. Cossé had rallied to Alençon's, hurrying to his apartments as the young prince increasingly moved into opposition. With the conspiracy exposed, he, alongside François de Montmorency would be imprisoned in the Bastille. With peace declared between the Malcontents and the crown in 1576, Cossé would have his freedom and offices restored as a term of the peace at the insistence of Alençon.

== Reign of Henri III ==
=== The Dutch enterprise ===
During the negotiations between Alençon and the Dutch States General in 1579, Cossé remained close to the prince and was a member of his council during the negotiations for Alençon becoming monarch of the Netherlands. In 1580 Alençon dispatched Cossé to Henri III to ensure his support for sending an army with Alençon as he moved into his new kingdom. Henri informed Cossé he had no opposition to the prospect but that his priority at the moment was establishing peace in the Midi.

== Sources ==
- Baird, Henry (1880). History of the Rise of the Huguenots: Vol 2 of 2. Hodder & Stoughton.
- Baumgartner, Frederic (1988). Henry II: King of France 1547-1559. Duke University Press.
- Carroll, Stuart (2005). Noble Power during the French Wars of Religion: The Guise Affinity and the Catholic Cause in Normandy. Cambridge University Press.
- Harding, Robert (1978). Anatomy of a Power Elite: the Provincial Governors in Early Modern France. Yale University Press.
- Holt, Mack (2002). The Duke of Anjou and the Politique Struggle During the Wars of Religion. Cambridge University Press.
- Holt, Mack P. (2005). The French Wars of Religion, 1562-1629. Cambridge University Press.
- Knecht, Robert (1998). Catherine de' Medici. Routledge.
- Knecht, Robert (2010). The French Wars of Religion, 1559-1598. Routledge.
- Nicholls, David (1994). "Protestants Catholics and Magistrates in Tours 1562-1572: The Making of a Catholic City during the Religious Wars". French History. 8 1.
- Roberts, Penny (2013). Peace and Authority during the French Religious Wars c.1560-1600. Palgrave Macmillan.
- Salmon, J.H.M (1975). Society in Crisis: France during the Sixteenth Century. Metheun & Co.
- Sutherland, Nicola (1980). The Huguenot Struggle for Recognition. Yale University Press.
- Thompson, James (1909). The Wars of Religion in France 1559-1576: The Huguenots, Catherine de Medici and Philip II. Chicago University Press.
- Wood, James (2002). The Kings Army: Warfare, Soldiers and Society during the Wars of Religion in France, 1562-1576. Cambridge University Press.
