= Madeleine of Savoy =

French court official

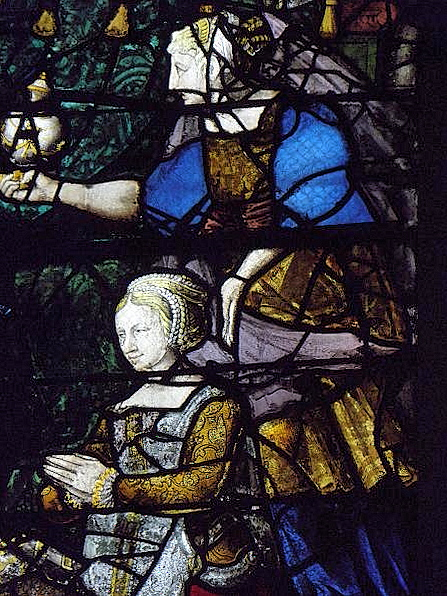
Kneeling, in a stained-glass window

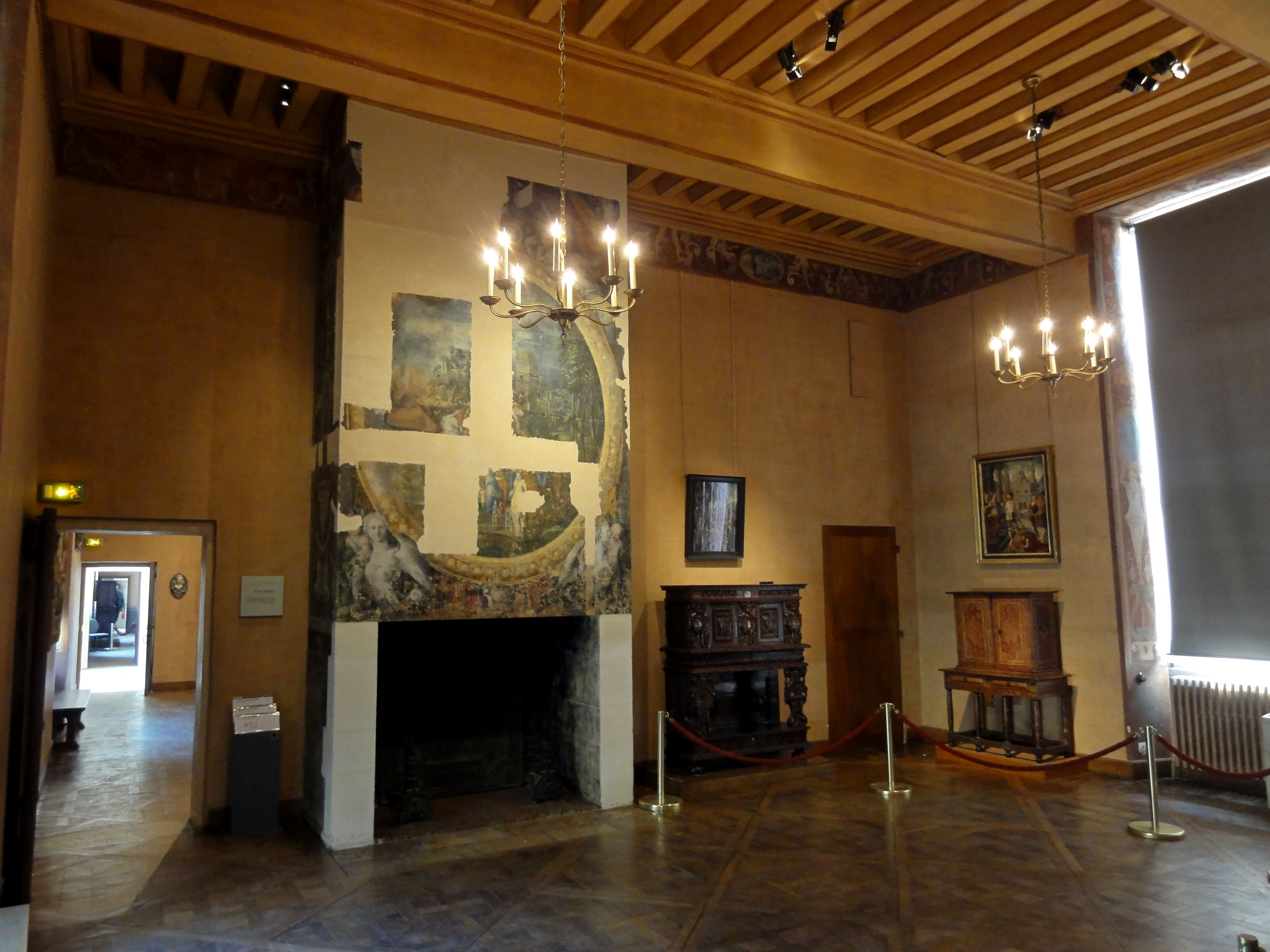
"Room of Madeleine of Savoy", as set up in the National Museum of the Renaissance at the Château d'Écouen, which she built with her husband.

Madeleine of Savoy (1510–1586) was a French court official, Première dame d'honneur to the queen of France, Elisabeth of Austria, from 1570 until 1574.

== Life ==
Madeleine was the daughter of René of Savoy and Anne Lascaris. She married constable Anne de Montmorency, a leading soldier and politician, in 1526. After she was widowed in 1567, Madeleine served as Première dame d'honneur to the queen of France, Elisabeth of Austria, from 1570 until 1574.

Madeleine of Savoy was described as an austere and strict Catholic with a deep dislike of the Huguenots, but not personally involved in politics, though she was a gathering force for her politically active relations and siblings.

== Issue ==
Madeleine and Anne had:

- François (1530–1579), succeeded his father as duke of Montmorency.
- Henri (1534–1614), succeeded his elder brother as duke of Montmorency.
- Charles (1537–1612), Admiral of France
- Gabriel
- Guillaume (died 1594)
- Eléonore (died 1557) married François de La Tour d'Auvergne
- Jeanne (1528–1596), married Louis III de La Trémoille
- Catherine (1532–1624) married Gilbert de Lévis, Duke of Ventadour
- Marie
- Anne
- Louise
- Madeleine

== Sources ==
- Akkerman, Nadine; Houben, Birgit, eds. (2014). The Politics of Female Households: Ladies-in-waiting across Early Modern Europe. Brill.
- Durand, Yves (2000). État et société en France aux XVIIe et XVIIIe siècles: Mélanges offerts à Yves Durand (in French). Presses Paris Sorbonne. ISBN 9782840501510.
- de L'Estoile, Pierre (1992). Registre-journal du règne de Henri III.: 1574-1575. Librairie Droz S.A.
- Marshall, Rosalind Kay (2006). Queen Mary's Women: Female Relatives, Servants, Friends and Enemies of Mary, Queen of Scots. John Donald.
- Sandberg, Brian (2018). "Montmorency Women and Confessional Politics at Court during the French Wars of Religion". In zum Kolk, Caroline; Wilson-Chevalier, Kathleen (eds.). Femmes à la cour de France: Charges et fonctions (XVe - XIXe siècle). Presses Universitaires Septentrion. pp. 269–292. ISBN 9782757423806.283
- Françoise Kermina, Les Montmorency, grandeur et déclin, Perrin, Paris, 2002.
- Henri de Panisse-Passis, Les comtes de Tende de la maison de Savoie, Librairie Firmin-Didot et Cie, 1889, 386 p

Court offices
Preceded by Guillemette de Sarrebruck	Première dame d'honneur to the Queen of France; 1570–1574	Succeeded by Jeanne de Dampierre
