= Siege of La Rochelle (1572–1573) =

Part of the French Wars of Religion

- Part of the French wars of religion
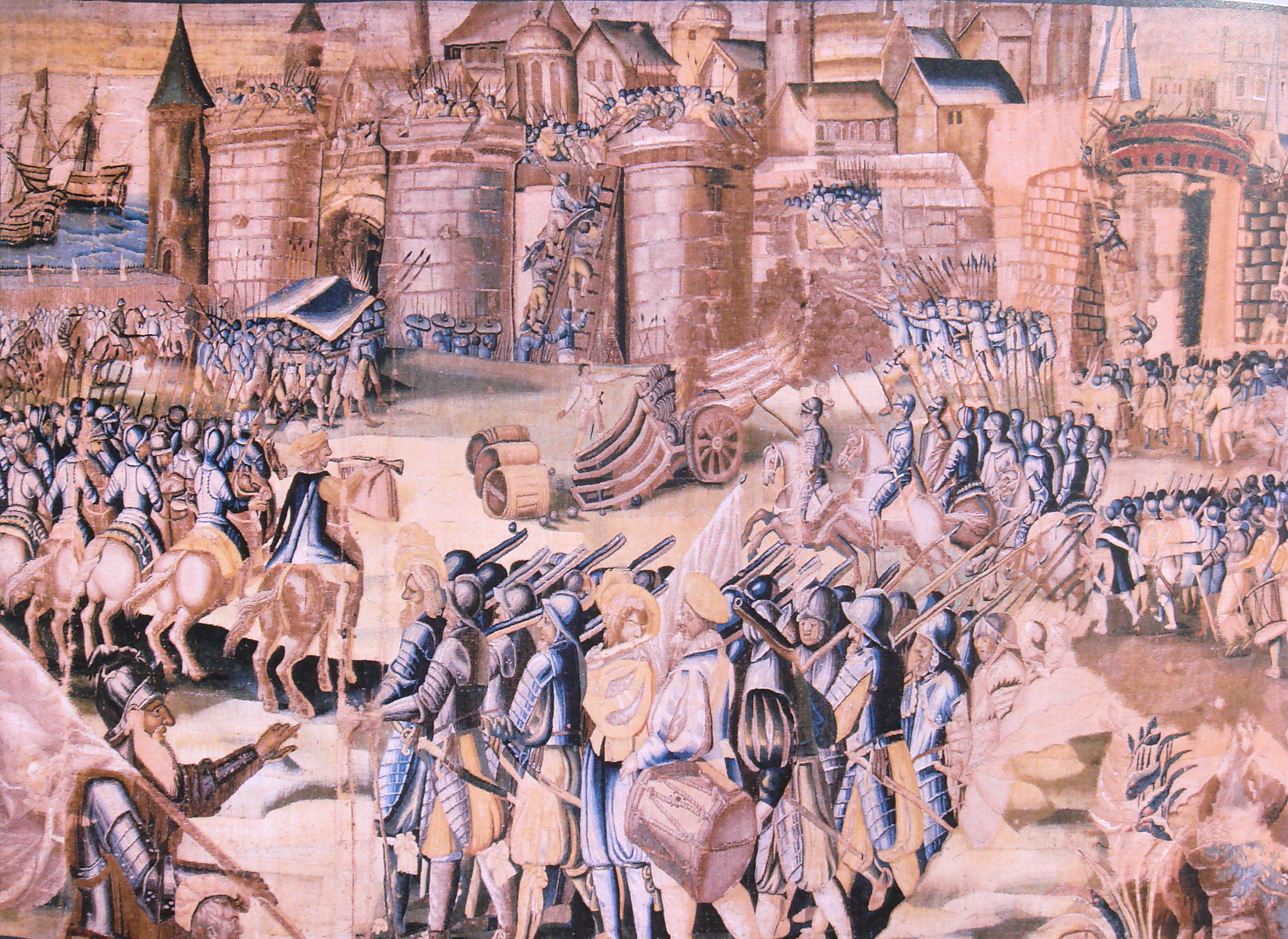
- The siege of La Rochelle by the Duke of Anjou in 1573 ("History of Henry III" tapestry, completed in 1623).
Date	6 November 1572 – 6 July 1573
Location	La Rochelle 46.1591°N 1.1517°W
Result	Stalemate

Belligerents
Kingdom of France	La Rochelle; Kingdom of England (support)

Commanders and leaders
Henry, Duke of Anjou	Gabriel de Lorges, Count of Montgomery (relief)

Strength
Siege army: 28,000	Defending army: 1,500; Huguenot refugees.

Casualties and losses
Siege army: 12,000 (including sickness and desertion) 73% casualty rate among officers.	Almost entire army and all refugees dead

The siege of La Rochelle of 1572–1573 was a massive military assault on the Huguenot city of La Rochelle by Catholic troops during the fourth phase of the French Wars of Religion, following the August 1572 St. Bartholomew's Day massacre. The conflict began in November 1572 when inhabitants of the city refused to receive Armand de Gontaut, baron de Biron, as royal governor. Beginning on 11 February 1573, the siege was led by the Duke of Anjou (the future Henry III of France). Political considerations following the duke's election to the throne of Poland in May 1573 resulted in negotiations, culminating on 24 June 1573, that lifted the siege on 6 July 1573. The Edict of Boulogne signed shortly thereafter brought an end to this phase of the civil war.

The siege of La Rochelle was contemporaneous with Catholic assaults on the cities of Sommières (led by Henri I de Montmorency) and Sancerre.

== Background ==
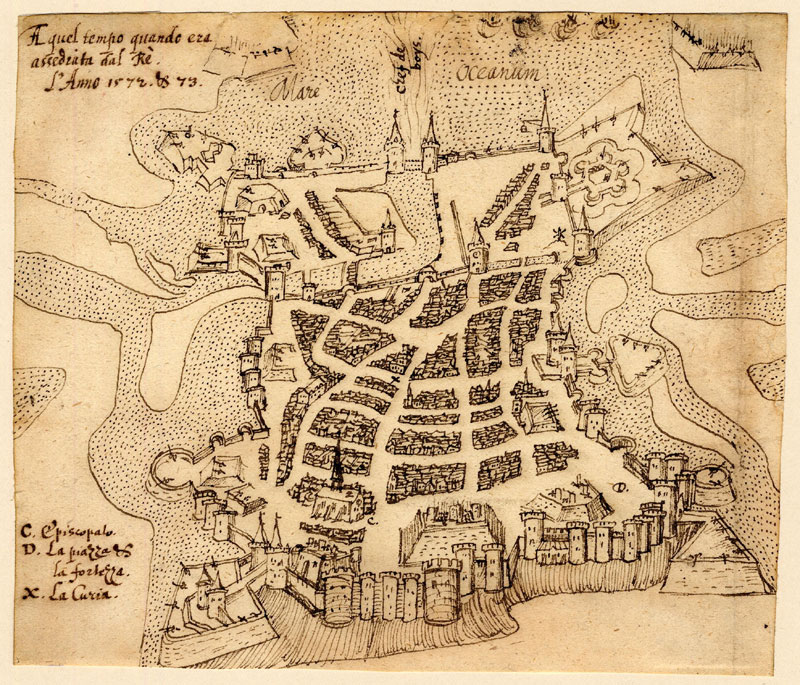
La Rochelle at the time of the 1572–1573 siege

Since 1568, La Rochelle had been the main base of the Huguenots in France. A city of 20,000 inhabitants and a port of strategic importance with historic links to England, La Rochelle benefited from administrative autonomy (lack of seigneur, bishop, or parlement) and had become overwhelmingly Huguenot (Calvinist).

After the St. Bartholomew's Day massacre and other massacres across France in the fall of 1572, numerous Huguenots fled to the city of La Rochelle as a last refuge. The city was well fortified, with access to the sea.

== Siege ==
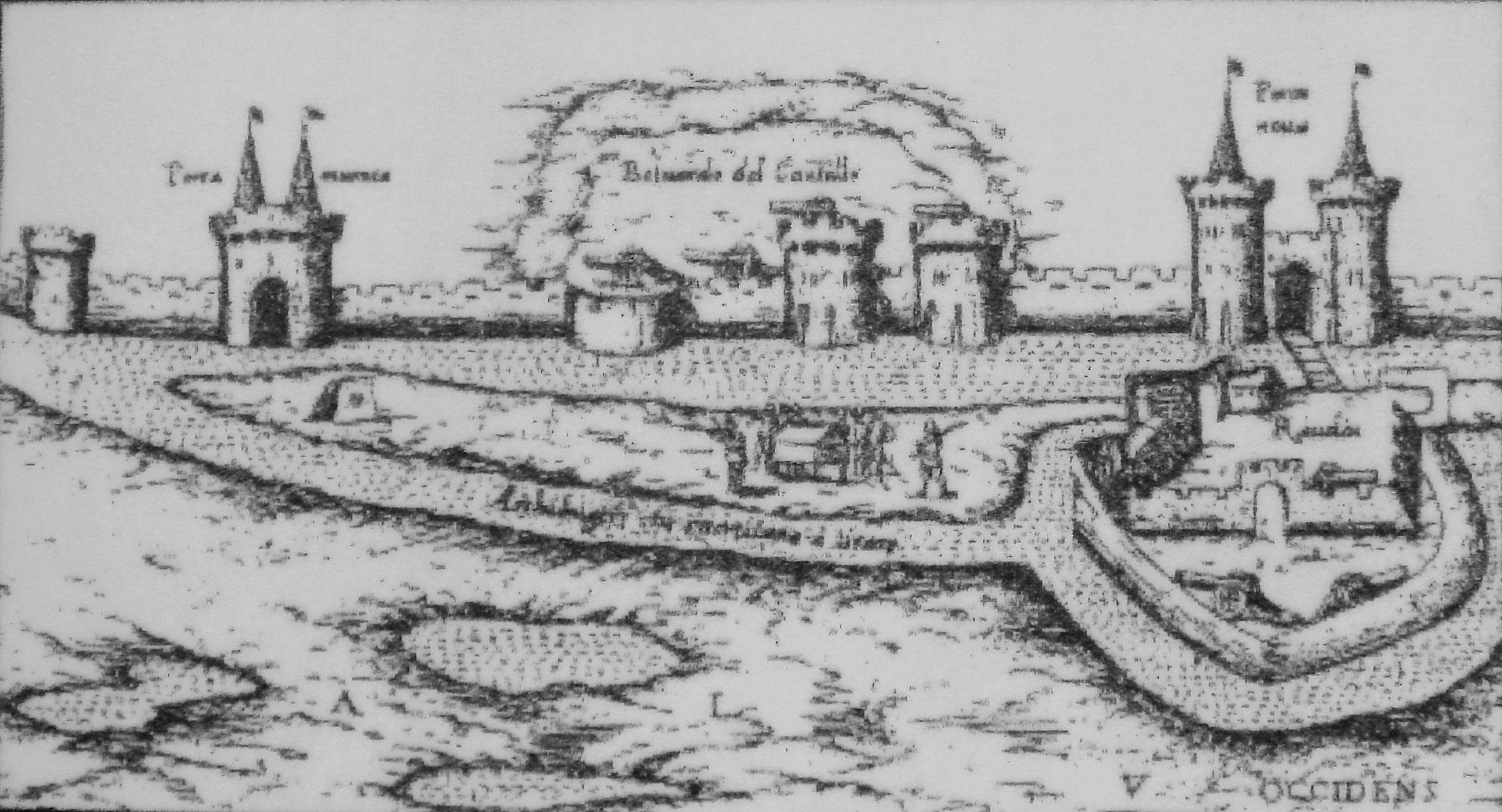
Western side of La Rochelle with remaining towers of Vauclair Castle and filled moats (centre), by Antonius Lafreri, Rome, circa 1573

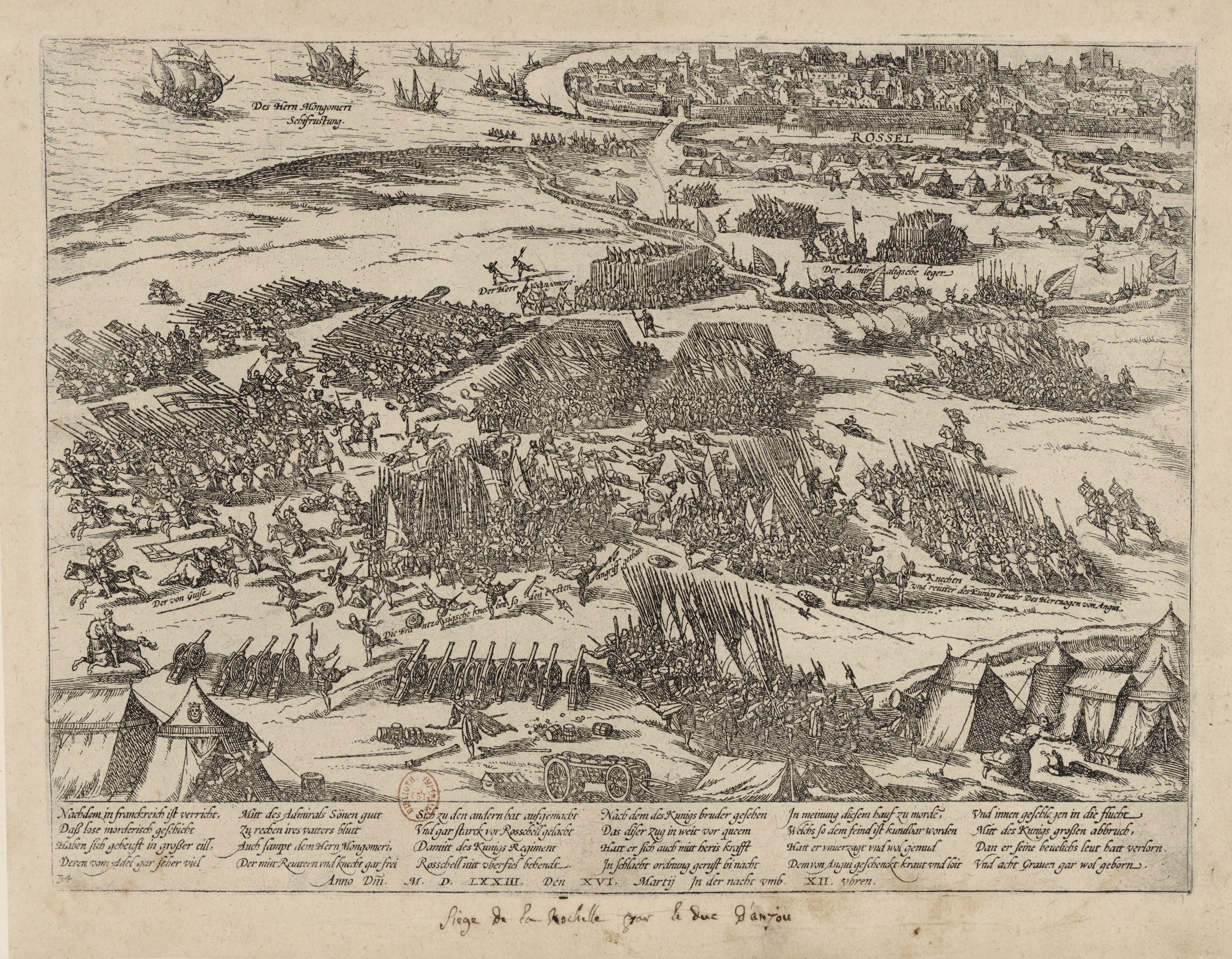
German print of the siege of La Rochelle (1572–1573), with the city in the background, and the fleet of Gabriel, comte de Montgomery, in the upper left corner

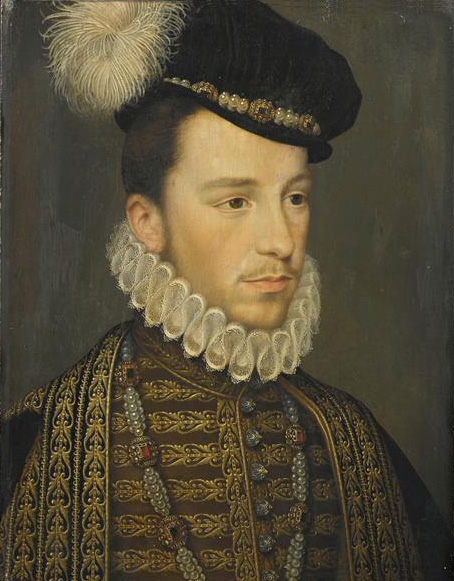
Henry, Duke of Anjou in 1570. Painting by Jean de Court

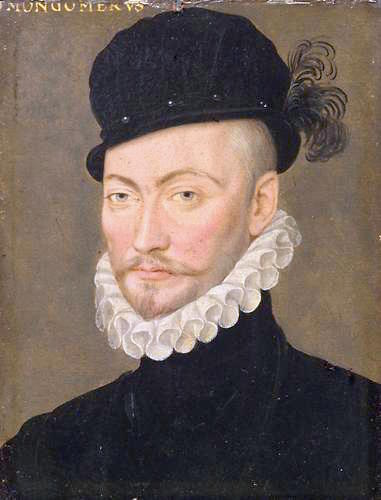
Gabriel de Lorges, Count of Montgomery (1530–1574)

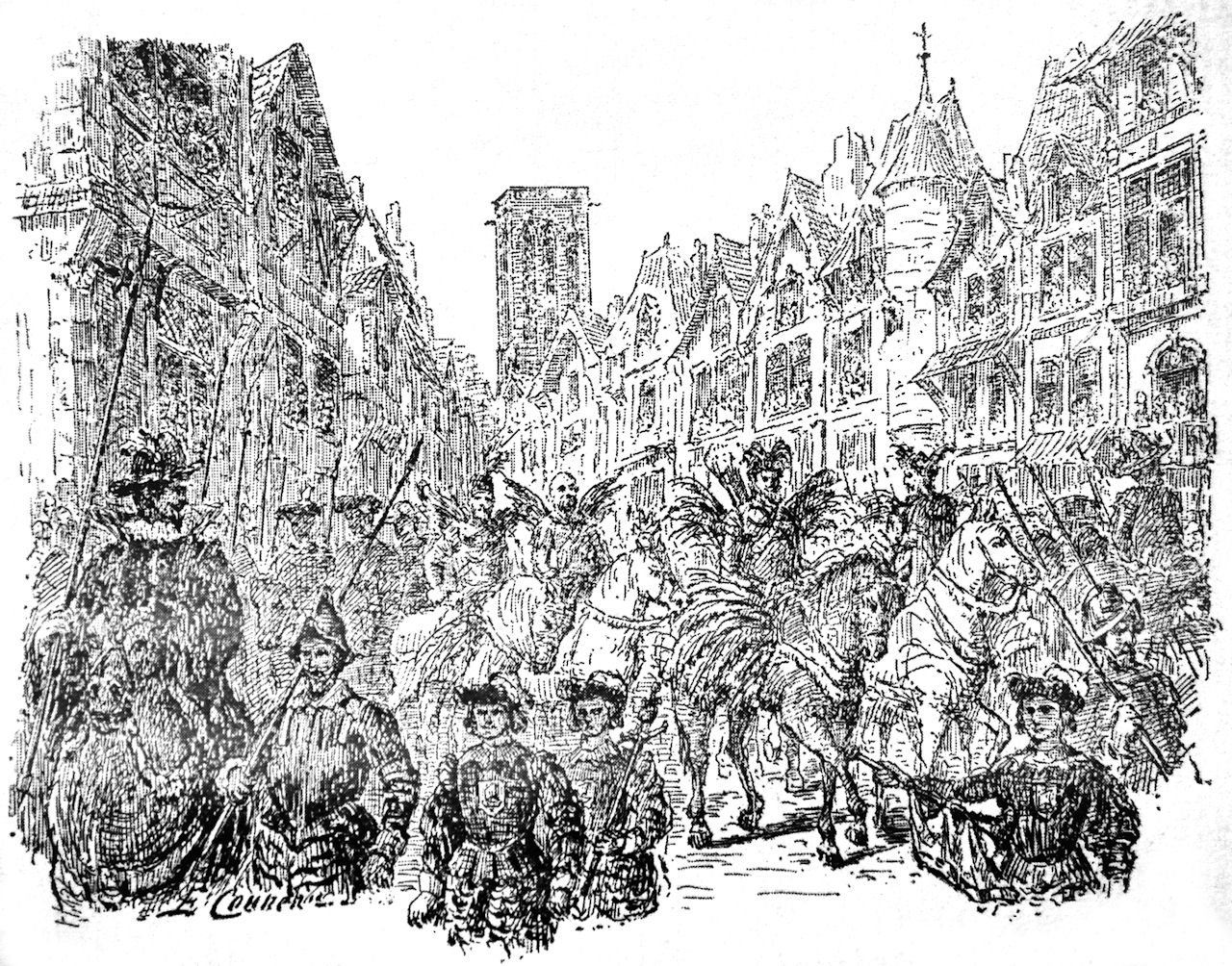
Entrance of the Polish delegates (winged Polish hussars depicted) in La Rochelle at the end of the siege in 1573

The conflict started in November 1572, when inhabitants of the city refused to receive Armand de Gontaut, baron de Biron, as royal governor. Charles IX ordered the city to be besieged. In the middle of November, François de la Noue, sent by Charles IX to negotiate with the city, was invited by the inhabitants to take up their defence. With the king's acceptance, La Noue joined the besieged city but was unable to effect a solution to the crisis, and on 12 March 1573, he left the city and watched the subsequent events from the royal camp.

On 11 February 1573, the Duke of Anjou arrived to take command of the siege with 28,000 men. His massive resources (munitions, cannons, gunpowder, cannonballs and food) were gathered from Paris, Picardy, Normandy, Poitou, Saintonge and Angoumois. The army included the Duke's brother François d'Alençon; the two former leaders of the Huguenots, Henry of Navarre and Henri I de Bourbon, prince de Condé; members of the Guise family, Charles of Lorraine, Duke of Mayenne, Claude, Duke of Aumale (killed on 21 February), Henry I, Duke of Guise; and other nobles including Louis IV de Nevers, Guillaume de Thoré, Henri de La Tour d'Auvergne, Duke of Bouillon, Filippo di Piero Strozzi, Albert de Gondi, Blaise de Monluc, Artus de Cossé-Brissac, Pierre de Bourdeille, seigneur de Brantôme and Armand de Gontaut, Baron of Biron. Among those nobles were some who remained suspicious of royal intentions and deplored the violence of the St. Bartholomew's Day massacre and some who were sympathetic to the Protestant cause. Political intrigues were in the royal camp.

Eight assaults on the city were waged from February to June. The attacks, along with the cold winter, resulted in large losses on the royal army's side. (Brantôme, who participated in the siege, exaggerated the death toll as 22,000 men, but records show that of the 155 commanders, 66 were killed and 47 were wounded.) On 26 March 1573, 150 attackers were killed in an accidental explosion of a mine intended to destroy the ramparts. The Duke of Anjou was himself wounded several times during the siege. On 23 May 1573, 6,000 Swiss guard mercenaries arrived as reinforcements for the royal army, but the attack three days later was a disaster for the royal troops.

The inhabitants of the city sent an ambassador to Queen Elizabeth I of England to seek her assistance, but she was still bound by the 1572 treaty with France (the Treaty of Blois) and so could send only a limited number of ships, led by Gabriel de Lorges, Count of Montgomery. Seven ships arrived in February 1573, but a larger group of ships was forced to turn back by the French Navy in April 1573; it retreated to Belle Île and then Jersey. Most of the city's dwindling resources were supplied through small naval raids on Catholic (principally Spanish) ships, which were also being attacked by the Dutch gueux de mer corsairs). To block La Rochelle's ships from accessing the sea, the Duke of Nevers sank a large barge but with no effect. (Later, during the siege of 1627–1628, Cardinal Richelieu would construct a massive sea barricade to block the city.)

At the end of May 1573, Henry of Anjou learned that he had been elected King of Poland, a country with a Protestant minority, which prompted him to pursue an end to the assault on La Rochelle. An agreement was reached on 24 June 1573, and Catholic troops ended the siege on 6 July 1573.

== Aftermath ==
The fourth phase of the Wars of Religion was brought to a close by the Edict of Boulogne signed in July 1573. La Rochelle was designated as one of the three cities in France where the Protestant faith was permitted, but only under strict conditions.

== Bibliography ==
- (in French) Arlette Jouanna and Jacqueline Boucher, Dominique Biloghi, Guy Thiec. Histoire et dictionnaire des Guerres de religion. Collection: Bouquins. Paris: Laffont, 1998. ISBN 2-221-07425-4
- R. J. Knecht, The French Wars of Religion 1559–1598 (Seminar Studies in History) ISBN 0-582-28533-X
- Portions of this article are based on a translation of the article Siège de La Rochelle (1573) from the French Wikipedia, retrieved on 16 March 2007.
