= Politique =

Member of a moderate group during the French Wars of Religion

During the sixteenth and seventeenth centuries, politiques (French pronunciation: [pɔlitik]) were Western European statesmen who prioritized the strength of the state above all other organs of society, including religion. During the French Wars of Religion, this included moderates of both religious faiths (Huguenots and Catholics) who held that the country could only be saved by the restoration of a strong monarchy which rose above religious differences. The term politique often had a pejorative connotation of moral or religious indifference, especially after 1576 in contrast with the radical Catholic League calling for the eradication of Protestantism in France. By 1588, the politiques were seen by pious detractors as a faction more pernicious than heretics. Similar clashes emerged during the same period in the Netherlands and England.

== History ==
In early critical writings, the politiques (largely jurists and intellectuals) were sometimes confused with another group, the "malcontents" (nobles who opposed the political influence of the Guise family). Many moderate politique Catholics defended the idea of Gallicanism, of making a distinction between the State and Religion, of a unitary and undivided royal sovereignty (against external influence or internal divisions), and of privileging national security and peace.

It can be argued that anyone who believed in the necessity of a strong monarchy to national security was a politique. For example, the politique policies of Henry IV of France, such as the Edict of Nantes (a document granting political and religious liberties to the minority French Protestants), directly contributed to the centralized administrative system of seventeenth century France and the absolutism embodied by Louis XIV, which included an eventual revocation of the Edict. Another example of a politique was Elizabeth I of England, who was (or claimed to be) a Catholic during the time of her sister Mary I but moved to Protestantism when attaining the throne. The later monarch Charles II - long flirting with Catholicism and holding out a promise to convert to it as a means of getting support from Louis XIV, but only actually converting on his deathbed - could also be considered to have acted as a Politique, though by his time the term was less often used.

Jonathan I. Israel emphasizes the important role played by various "Politiques" in the Dutch Revolt of the 16th Century and the 17th Century Dutch Republic created by that revolt. Specifically, he notes as the most important of them William the Silent, who moved from the Catholic Church to the Calvinist one - the opposite direction to that taken by his contemporary Henry IV of France, but taken out of similar motives. In Jonathan Israel's view, the long-term influence of such Dutch Politiques was positive, helping to mitigate the more intransigent forms of Calvinism and to create in the Netherlands a climate of (relative) religious toleration, greater than in other European countries at the time. Likewise, Blair Worden makes the point that during the Commonwealth of England, while the Lord Protector Oliver Cromwell was broadly Calvinist, his circle contained non-sectarian ‘merciful men’ or politiques who were more tolerant of other doctrines.

== See also ==
- Realpolitik
