= Malcontents (France) =

Faction of gentlemen in the "fifth" French War of Religion (1574–1576)

The Malcontents were a faction of gentlemen in the "fifth" French War of Religion (1574–1576). They opposed the policy of Henry of Valois, duc d'Anjou, who had become king under the name Henry III on 30 May 1574, and allied themselves with the Huguenots. The leader was the King's brother Francis, Duke of Alençon (made Duke of Anjou in 1576).

The main goal of the Malcontents was to oppose the absolutist ambitions of the King. Established in 1574, they were unhappy (malcontent) with the way the King treated the old French nobility.

The Malcontent movement has been compared to the Fronde, 70 years later.

== Members ==
The Malcontents had both Catholic and Huguenot members. The leaders were:

- The Duke of Alençon, Catholic and the King's younger brother
- Henri I de Montmorency, Catholic
- Guillaume de Montmorency-Thoré, Catholic
- Henri, Prince of Condé, Protestant
- Henri de Navarre, Protestant and future King Henry IV of France
- John Casimir of the Palatinate-Simmern, German Protestant supporter of the Huguenots in France.
