= Edict of Boulogne =

1573 edict by Charles IX of France

The Edict of Boulogne, also called the Edict of Pacification of Boulogne and the Peace of La Rochelle, was signed in June 1573 by Charles IX of France in the Château de Madrid in the Bois de Boulogne. It was officially registered by the Parlement of Paris on 11 August 1573. The treaty officially ended the fourth phase of the French Wars of Religion (set off by the St. Bartholomew's Day massacre in August 1572; this phase of the wars included the siege of La Rochelle (1572–1573) and the Siege of Sancerre).

== Content ==
The treaty severely curtailed many of the rights granted to the French Protestants in the previous Peace of Saint-Germain-en-Laye. Based on the terms of the treaty, all Huguenots were granted amnesty for their past actions and the freedom of belief. However, they were permitted the freedom to worship only within the three towns of La Rochelle, Montauban, and Nîmes, and there only privately within their own residences; Protestant nobles with the right of high-justice were permitted to celebrate marriages and baptisms, but only before an assembly limited to ten persons outside of their family. Outside of the three mentioned cities, Protestant worship was forbidden completely.

== See also ==
- List of treaties
