= Henri de Montmorency, 3rd Duke of Montmorency =

French soldier and governor

Henri de Montmorency
- 3rd Duke of Montmorency
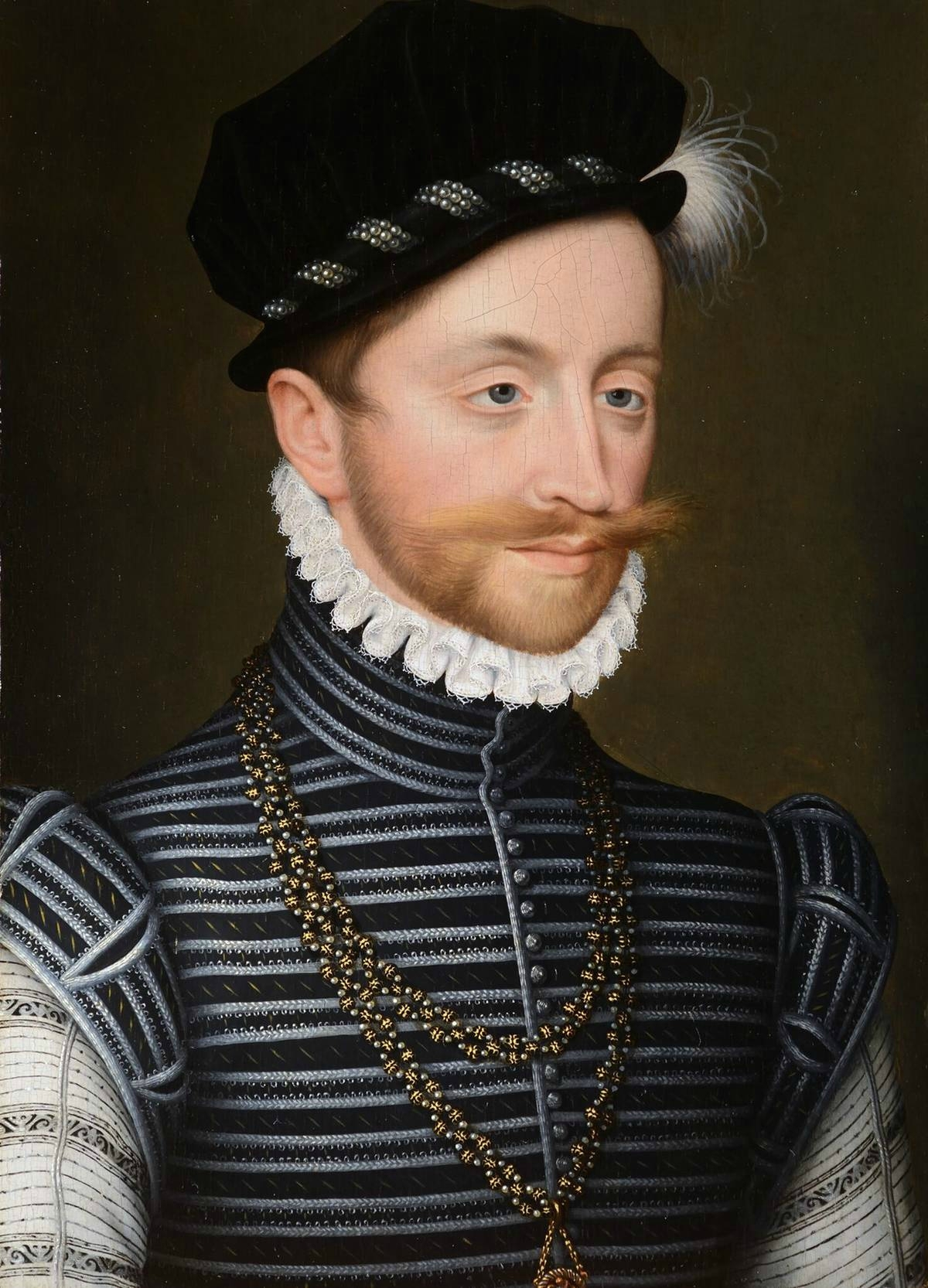
- Born: 15 June 1534; Chantilly
- Died: 2 April 1614 (aged 79); La Grange-des-Prés
- Noble family: House of Montmorency
- Spouses: Antoinette de La Marck; Louise de Budos; Laurence de Montmorency
- Issue: Henri II de Montmorency
- Father: Anne de Montmorency
- Mother: Madeleine of Savoy

Henri de Montmorency, 3rd Duke of Montmorency (15 June 1534 in Chantilly, Oise – 2 April 1614), Marshal of France, and Constable of France, seigneur of Damville, served as Governor of Languedoc from 1563 to 1614.

== Biography ==
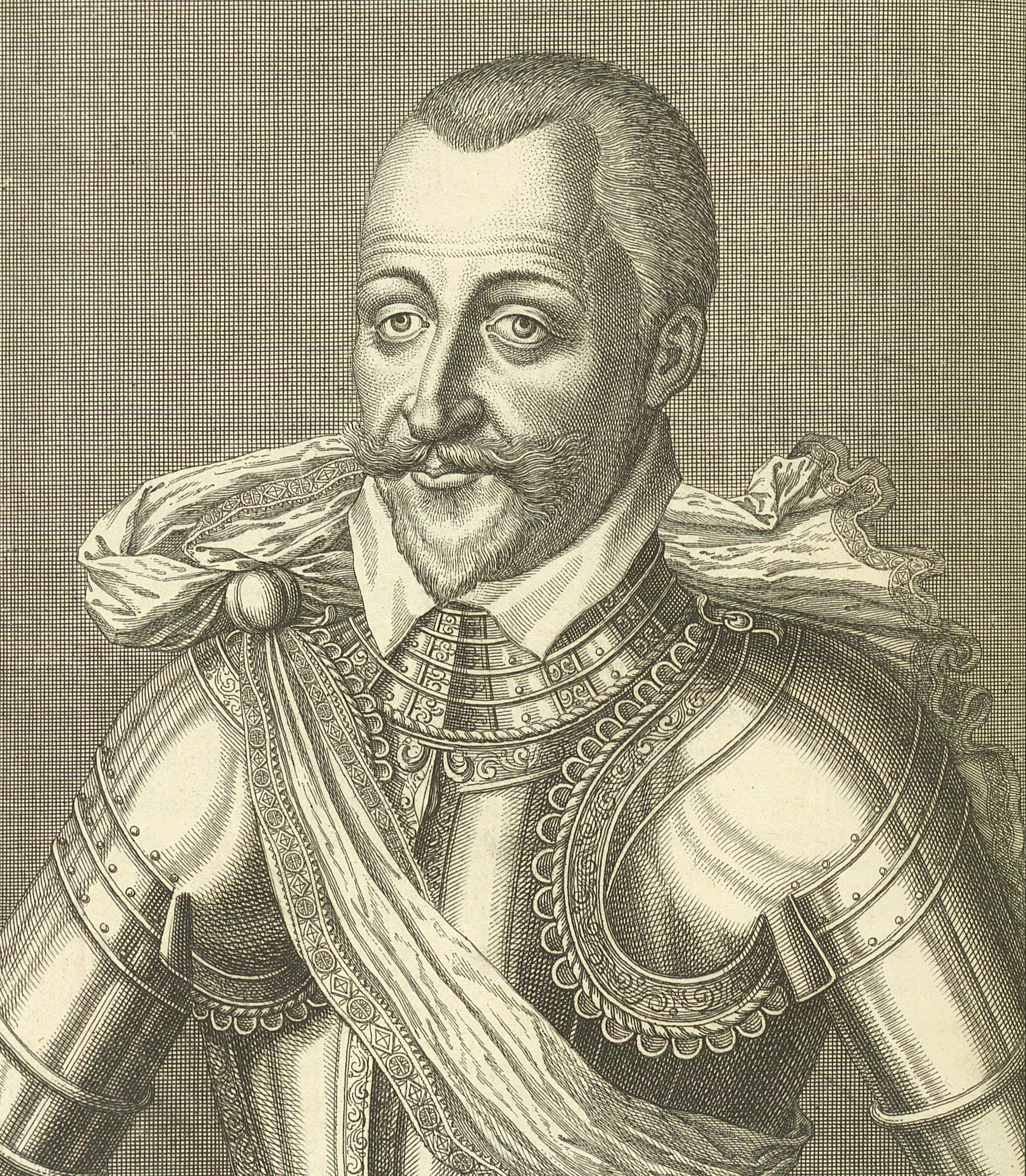
Engraved portrait of Henri de Montmorency

Born on 15 June 1534, Henri was the son of Anne de Montmorency and Madeleine of Savoy. As governor of Languedoc, he led an army into Toulouse, campaigning for nine months in 1570, and was chastized by the capitouls for letting Catholic property fall into the hands of a passing Protestant army without taking action. They accused Henri of being betraying the city and being in league with Protestants like his cousin Admiral Coligny. He responded by arresting four bourgeois and sending them to Paris with charges of slander. Henri also placed a procureur-général on the Parlement of Toulouse who was suspected of Protestantism. In October 1574 he joined with the Protestants of lower Languedoc, was deprived of his office by the Parlement of Toulouse, and arrests were made of his associates charged with conspiracy against the king. In the midst of these arrests, Henri hanged one of his own captains on a suspicion of poisoning, believing that Henry III of France was trying to kill him.

Henri became Duke of Montmorency on his brother François' death in 1579. As a leader of the party called the Politiques he took a prominent part in the French Wars of Religion. In 1593 Henri was made constable of France, but Henry IV kept him away from Languedoc, owing to his nickname "King of Languedoc".

== Issue ==
Henri and his first wife, Antoinette de La Marck (1542–1591), daughter of Robert IV de La Marck, had:

- Charlotte de Montmorency (1571–1636), married in 1591 Charles de Valois, Duke of Angoulême
- Marguerite de Montmorency (1577–1660), married in 1593, Anne de Lévis, Duke of Ventadour

Henri and his second wife, Louise de Budos (1575–1598), had:

- Charlotte Marguerite de Montmorency
- Henri II de Montmorency

Montmorency also fathered a number of children out of wedlock.

Catherine Guillens de Castellet

- Splendian (1606–1645)
- Jules (? – +1578)

Unknown mother

- Annibal (?–)
- Henri (?–)
- Cesar (?–)
- Marie (?–)

== Sources ==
- Barbier, Jean Paul (2002). Ma bibliothèque Poétique (in French). Librairie Droz.
- Davies, Joan (1979). "Persecution and Protestantism: Toulouse, 1562-1575". The Historical Journal. 22 (1, March). Cambridge University Press: 31–51. doi:10.1017/S0018246X00016666.
- Davies, Joan (2000). "The Secretariat of Henri I, Duc de Montmorency, 1563-1614". The English Historical Review. 115 ((Sept) 463). Oxford University Press: 812–842. doi:10.1093/ehr/115.463.812. JSTOR 580680.
- Dessert, Daniel (2015). Les Montmorency : Mille ans au service des rois de France (in French). Flammarion.
- Diefendorf, Barbara B. (2004). From Penitence to Charity: Pious Women and the Catholic Reformation in Paris. Oxford University Press.
- Kamen, Henry (2000). Who's Who in Europe, 1450-1750. Routledge.
- Knecht, Robert J. (2010). The French Wars of Religion, 1559-1598 (3rd ed.). Longman.
- Parsons, Jotham (2014). Making Money in Sixteenth-Century France: Currency, Culture, and the State. Cornell University Press.
- Potter, David, ed. (2004). Foreign Intelligence and Information in Elizabethan England. Vol. 25: Two English Treatises on the State of France, 1580–1584. Cambridge University Press.
- Sidney, Philip (2012). Kuin, Roger (ed.). The Correspondence of Sir Philip Sidney. Vol. 1. Oxford University Press.
- Ward, A.W.; Prothero, G.W.; Leathes, Stanley, eds. (1911). The Cambridge Modern History. Vol. XIII. Cambridge University Press.

Henri de Montmorency, 3rd Duke of Montmorency House of Montmorency Born: 16 June 1534 Died: 2 April 1614
Preceded by François	Duke of Montmorency; 1579–1614	Succeeded by Henri II
