= Pierre de Bocosel de Chastelard =

French writer (1540–1563)

Pierre de Bocosel de Chastelard (1540–1563), French poet, was born in Dauphiné; a scion of the house of Bayard, grandson of Chevalier de Bayard. His name is inseparably connected with Mary, Queen of Scots, for whom he conceived an insane passion.

== Career ==
From the service of the Constable Montmorency, Chastelard, then a page, passed to the household of Marshal Damville, whom he accompanied in his journey to Scotland in escort of Mary (1561). He returned to Paris in the marshal's train, but left for Scotland again shortly afterwards, bearing letters of recommendation to Mary from his old protector, Montmorency, and the Regrets addressed to the Queen Dowager of France by Pierre de Ronsard, his master in the art of song. He attempted to deliver to the poet the service of plate with which Mary rewarded him. By now, he had developed an obsessive love for the queen.

The young man was welcomed in her cabinet room. One day he hid himself under her bed at Holyrood Palace, where he was discovered by her maids of honour, or two male grooms of the chamber. Mary pardoned the offence, but Chastelard was foolish enough to violate her privacy again. He was discovered a second time under her bed at Burntisland, seized, sentenced and beheaded at St Andrews on 22 February 1563. He met his fate valiantly and consistently, reading, on his way to the scaffold, his master's noble Hymne de la mort, and turning at the instant of doom towards the palace of Holyrood, to address to his unseen mistress the famous farewell "Adieu, toi si belle et si cruelle, qui me tues et que je ne puis cesser d'aimer" ("farewell to you, so beautiful and so cruel, who kill me and whom I cannot cease to love"). This at least is the version of the Memoirs of Brantôme, who is, however, a notoriously untrustworthy source.

A "Madame de Curosot" was said to be a Huguenot sponsor of the poet. It has been suggested that she was Charlotte de Laval, the wife of Gaspard II de Coligny. The name "Curosot" may have a cipher name substituted for "Châtillon" in original correspondence.

== Randolph's account ==
The English diplomat Thomas Randolph described the arrest of Chastelard in his letters to William Cecil. He notes Chastelard as a servant of Monsieur D'Anville. When he arrived in Scotland in November 1561, Mary showed him her favour by letting him ride a horse that was a present from her half-brother Lord Robert Stewart. He gave her a book of his own poems. On 14 February 1563, St Valentine's day, Chastelard was discovered in the Queen's chamber under her Great Bed at Rossend Castle at Burntisland. Mary ordered her half brother the Earl of Moray to execute him on the spot. Instead, the unfortunate poet was taken to St Andrews. Randolph wrote that Chastelard had made a similar attempt at Holyroodhouse. In his defence, Chastelard claimed he had been caught in the Queen's privy but witnesses insisted he was under the bed. He was beheaded a week later at the Market Cross of St Andrews on market day. Mary was consoled by the company of Mary Fleming.
