= Louise de Montmorency =

French aristocrat (1496–1547)

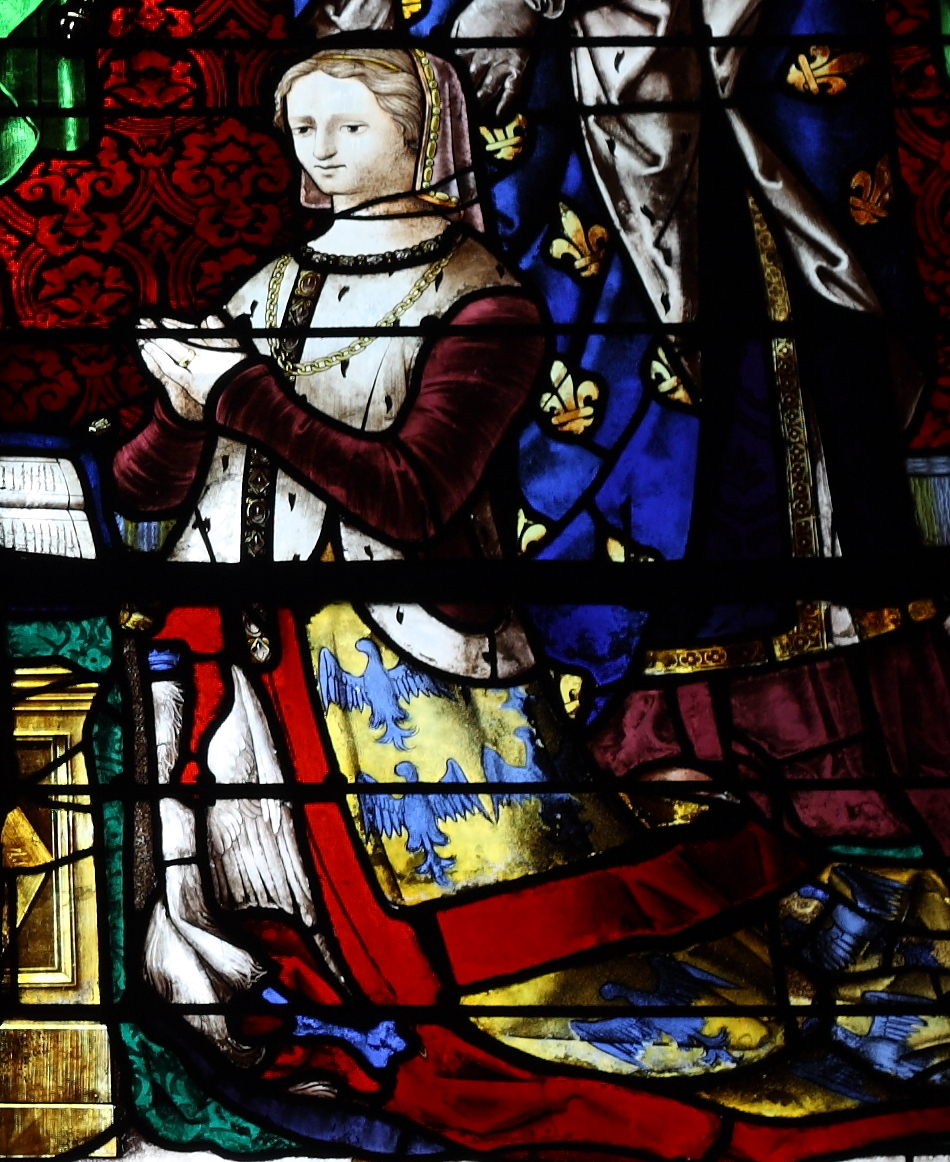
- Louise de Montmorency depicted on a stained glass window in the Saint-Martin de Montmorency collegiate church, around 1525.
- Born: 1496
- Died: June 12, 1547 (aged 50–51)
- Spouse(s): Ferri de Mailly; Gaspard I de Coligny
- Children: Odet; Gaspard II; Francois
- Parents: Guillaume de Montmorency (father); Anne Pot (mother)

Louise de Montmorency (1496 – 12 June 1547) was a French aristocrat and courtier. She served as Première dame d'honneur from 1530 to 1535 to the Queen of France, Eleanor of Austria, spouse to Francis I of France. She also played an important role within patronage and as a supporter of Calvinism.

== Life ==
Louise was the daughter of Guillaume de Montmorency and Anne Pot and younger sister of Anne de Montmorency, Constable of France.

In 1530, Louise was appointed Première dame d'honneur to the new queen, Eleanor of Austria, a new court office installed just a few years earlier, which made her responsible for all of the other ladies-in-waiting of the queen. She retired in 1535 and was replaced by Mme de Givry.

Louise had considerable patronage power independently of her husband, and had an important role in spreading the influence of Calvinism in France in the 16th Century.

== Marriages ==
Louise married her first husband, Ferri de Mailly, in 1511. This marriage produced a daughter;

- Madeleine de Mailly.

Ferry died in 1513, and Louise remarried in 1514 to Gaspard I de Coligny. From her second marriage she had three sons, all of whom played important roles in the first period of the French Wars of Religion:

- Odet, Cardinal de Châtillon
- Gaspard, Admiral of France
- François, Seigneur d'Andelot.

== Family tree ==
Coligny family tree

Guillaume de Montmorency	Anne Pot
Gaspard I	Louise de Montmorency	Anne de Montmorency, 1st Duke of Montmorency	Madeleine of Savoy
Charlotte de Laval	Gaspard II	Odet	François	François de Montmorency	Henri	Charles de Montmorency-Damville
Louise	François	Charles	Paul de Coligny
Frederick Henry, Prince of Orange	Gaspard III	Guy XX de Laval
William II of Orange	Gaspard IV de Coligny	Henriette	Anne	George II of Württemberg-Montbéliard
William III of England	Eleonore	Leopold

== Sources ==
- Bersier, Eugène (1884). Coligny; The Earlier Life of the Great Huguenot. Translated by Holmden, Annie Harwood. London: Hodder and Stoughton. OCLC 1099279.
- Davies, Joan (2002). "The Montmorencys and the Abbey of Sainte Trinité, Caen: Politics, Profit and Reform" (PDF). The Journal of Ecclesiastical History. 53 (4): 665–685. doi:10.1017/S002204690200427X.
- Holt, Mack P. (1999). The French Wars of Religion, 1562-1629. Cambridge University Press.
- Kettering, Sharon (1989). "The patronage power of early modern French noblewomen". The Historical Journal. 32, No. 4 (Dec.) (4): 817–841. doi:10.1017/S0018246X00015727. JSTOR 2639686. S2CID 154262093.
- Moreton-Macdonald, John Ronald (1915). A History of France. Vol. 2. The Macmillan Company.
- Noble, Graham (2002). "The Development of Protestantism in 16th Century France". History Review. Archived from the original on 2006-04-27 – via Questia.
- Roche, Aline (2010). "Une perle de pris : la maison de la reine Eléonore d'Autriche". Cour de France.fr (in French). Archived from the original on 2013-12-03.
- Shimizu, J. (1970). Conflict of Loyalties, Politics and Religion in the Career of Gaspard de Coligny, Admiral of France, 1519-1572. Librairie Droz.
