= Charles de Coligny =

Charles de Coligny (1564–1632) was a member of the House of Coligny. The youngest of the three children of Gaspard II de Coligny and Charlotte de Laval, he became marquis of Coligny-le-Vieux, Andelot and Saint-Bris, baron of Lanty and lord of Dinteville, Dannemarie, Auxon and Cusey. He was the only one of Gaspard and Charlotte's children to be baptized a Protestant and the only one to convert to Roman Catholicism.

== Life ==
He was captured after the St Bartholomew's Day Massacre and imprisoned in Marseille until freed in May 1576. He then fought for the King of Navarre alongside his brother in the Rouerge and Languedoc. In August 1577 he and his brother recaptured the town of Mauguio and Charles was left behind to garrison it. In June 1585 he raised an infantry regiment and led it on campaign in Languedoc until 1587 as part of the duke of Montmorency's force. He fought alongside Lesdiguières in summer 1587 in the Dauphiné, Savoy and Vivarais.

He was captured again in July 1590 during the siege of Paris, before switching to the Catholic League and converting to Roman Catholicism. He based himself in Lyon and was imprisoned for a time at Pierre Scize on the orders of the duke of Nemours in 1593. In 1596 he became a gentleman in ordinary to Henry IV of France. In 1598 he was made a maréchal de camp, in 1604 governor of Langres and in 1608 lieutenant general to the government of Champagne - he gave up the lieutenancy generalship in 1615 in favour of his eldest son. From 1615 to 1616 he was put in command of a small force sent against the rebel princes such as Luxembourg in the Champagne - commanding 2,500 infantry and 600 cavalry he besieged Varennes and Soyeras in Bassigny then Brienne and Rosnay. In 1617 he was made freeholder of Coligny-le-Vieil and Andelot by Archduke Albert. Coligny-le-Vieux and Andelot were promoted into marquisates in his favour, but in 1629 he sold them both to his cousin Clériadus de Coligny. On 31 December 1619 he was made a knight of the Order of the Holy Spirit and the Order of Saint Michael.

== Marriage and issue ==
He married Humberte or Huberte de Chastenay, lady of Lanty and Dinteville.

=== Joachim François ===
Joachim-François, marquis d’Andelot, mestre-de-camp to a 1200 strong infantry regiment and his father's successor as lieutenant governor of Champagne (1615). He campaigned in Italy and in 1623 presented himself to Monsieur de Bérulle for reception into the Oratorian order in Paris. He was ordained a priest by Sébastien Zamet, bishop of Langres, in February 1625. He became head of the new Company of the Holy Sacrament in 1631 and founded a 'carmel' at Chaumont-en-Bassigny as well as making many gifts to Châtillon. After his brother's death he retired to Lanty and fell sick in 1654. He moved to Châtillon and made his will before dying on 18 October 1654 - after receiving the last rites he cried out "I die a child of the Catholic, Apostolic and Roman Church". His body was buried in the castle church at Châtillon and his heart in Lenty.

=== Bernard ===
Born in 1605, he owed his name to his recovery from illness aged six months on 7 February 1609, after his father prayed for the intercession of saint Bernard of Clairvaux. He became marquis of Coligny-le-Vieux, Andelot and Saint-Bris, baron of Lanty and Dinteville and lieutenant-général of Champagne. In 1625 he married Gabrielle de Pouilly, daughter of Simon de Pouilly, baron of Esne and Manonville, lord of Loupy, marshal of Barrois, governor of Stenay, and his wife Françoise de Berniaut. He died without issue in 1627 and his widow remarried to Claude-Roger de Cominges, marquis of Vervins.

=== Marguerite-Marie ===
In 1621 she married Pierre-Ernest, sovereign count of Créanges and in 1650 (after 14 years as a widow) to Charles-Étienne d’Hury de Boutenay, count of Hombourg, baron of Lenty, grand-tranchant de France, who died aged 63 in 1686. Marguerite-Marie died in 1672 and was buried at Les Carmélites de Chaumont-en-Bassigny, founded by her brother.

== Family tree ==
Coligny family tree

Guillaume de Montmorency	Anne Pot
Gaspard I	Louise de Montmorency	Anne de Montmorency	Madeleine of Savoy
Charlotte de Laval	Gaspard II	Odet	François	François de Montmorency	Henri	Charles de Montmorency-Damville
Louise	François	Charles	Paul de Coligny
Frederick Henry, Prince of Orange	Gaspard III	Guy XX de Laval
William II of Orange	Gaspard IV de Coligny	Henriette	Anne	George II of Württemberg-Montbéliard
William III of England	Eleonore	Leopold

== Bibliography ==
- (in French) Roch de Pillot de Coligny (Axor-Danaé éditeur), Histoire généalogique de la maison de Coligny
