= Château de Châtillon-Coligny =

Castle in France

Coordinates: 47.822102°N 2.849298°E

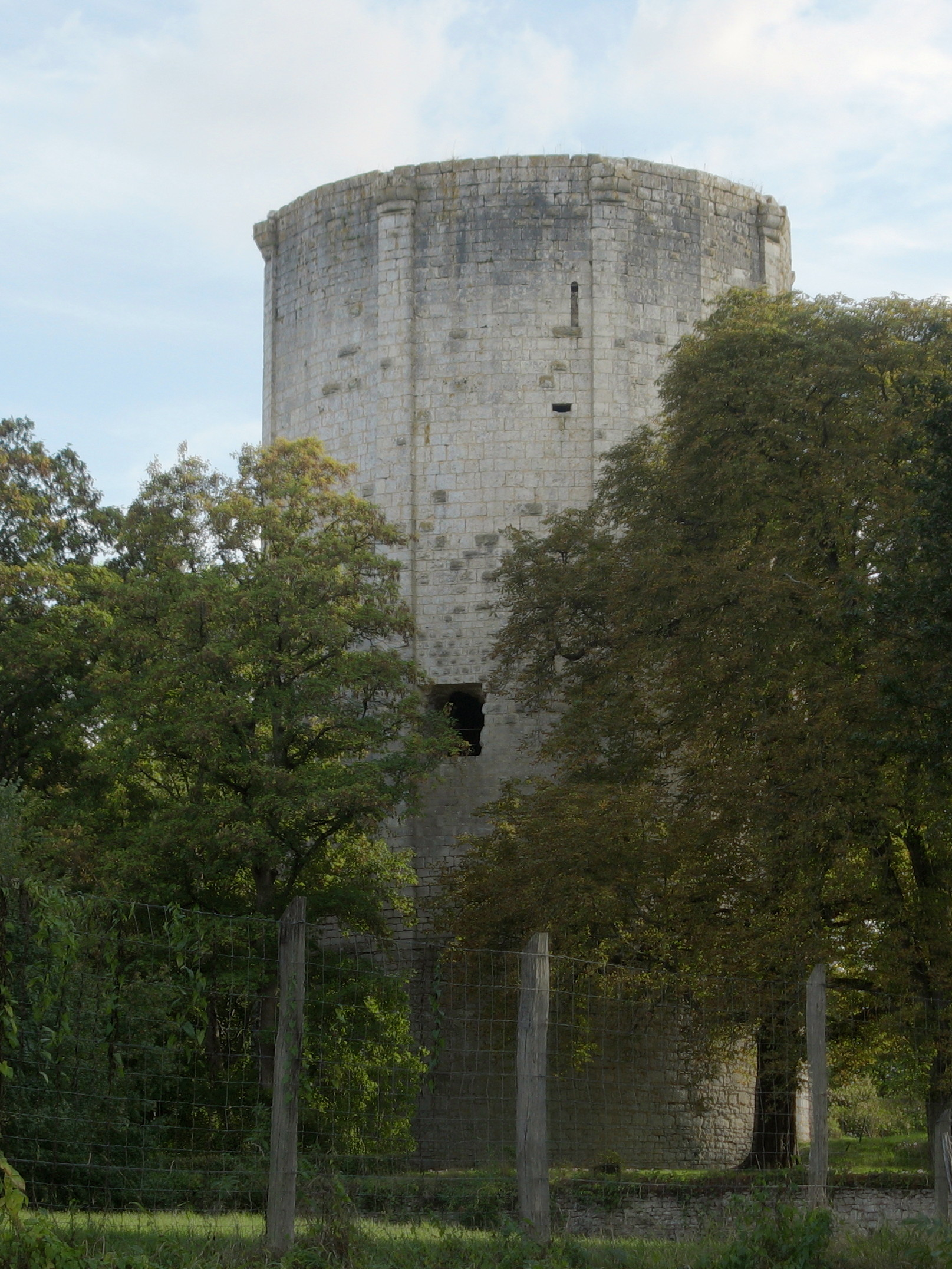
Keep of Château de Châtillon-Coligny.

The Château de Châtillon-Coligny is a castle, later replaced with a smaller château, in the commune of Châtillon-Coligny in the Loiret département of France.

The present structure is heavily modified. Its origins were a medieval fortress whose keep was constructed around 1180. The castle was rebuilt during the Renaissance and demolished from 1798. A new, more modest château was constructed in 1854. Of the original, the keep and a Renaissance well, attributed to Jean Goujon, are the only remains.

== Location ==
The castle is built on a plateau dominating the Loing valley.

== History ==
- 1059: Châtillon was a castrum held by the counts of Blois; it was a simple wooden tower, known as Castri Castellionis around 1120.
- 1143: It was destroyed by Louis VII and the Châtillon family died out. In the mid-12th century, the Champagne family took over the land.
- c1180 The keep was erected by Etienne I de Sancerre. The polygonal tower has six faces with buttresses in alternate corners, with rustic bossages.
- 1209: The collegiate church of Saint Pierre was founded.
- 1359: Louis de Melun arranged a wider line of fortifications, extended in 1376 around the lower town.
- 1437: The land passed to the House of Coligny.
- 1464: Jean III de Coligny ordered the building of the terrace below the orangery. The building known as the Fer à Cheval (horseshoe) probably also dates from this time.
- 1547 - 1562: Admiral Gaspard II de Coligny built a gallery terrace to the north of the earlier terrace and another terrace in the west linked to the gallery terrace with a pavilion. The gallery terrace was decorated by Francesco Primaticcio (Le Primatice) and Jean Goujon and the pavilion contained a staircase. Gaspard II also built the sculptured well, attributed to Goujon, and the orangery, one of the first in the country and described as "the most beautiful of the orangeries constructed in France in the 16th century".
- 1552: The collegiate church and the parish were transferred to a new church in the town.
- During the French Wars of Religion, the enceinte was reinforced with six bastions.
- 1569: Martinangue, governor of Gien, hunted the reformers and pillaged the castle.
- 1572: The castle's destruction was ordered and began with the south pavilion, but this was soon interrupted.
- 1638: Gaspard III hired the painter Duchemin to decorate the castle.
- 1645: Gaspard IV de Coligny renounced Protestantism.
- 1648: He was made a duke (pairie duché: an inheritable peerage). He constructed a pavilion with four apartments, gardens possibly designed by André Le Nôtre, the four pavilions in the corner of the garden and the staircase leading to the garden.
- 1798: Antoine François Gourgeon and Hugues Montbrun, appointed to sell the castle, were authorised to demolish it and sell off the material.
- 1816: Charles Emmanuel de Montmorency Luxembourg bought the castle and, in 1854, built the present house.

The castle is privately owned. The orangery and terraces have been listed since 1930 and the keep and well classified since 1949 as monument historiques by the French Ministry of Culture.

== See also ==
- List of castles in France
