= Charlotte de Laval =

French noblewoman, first wife of Gaspard de Coligny (1530–1568)

- Dame de Châtillon
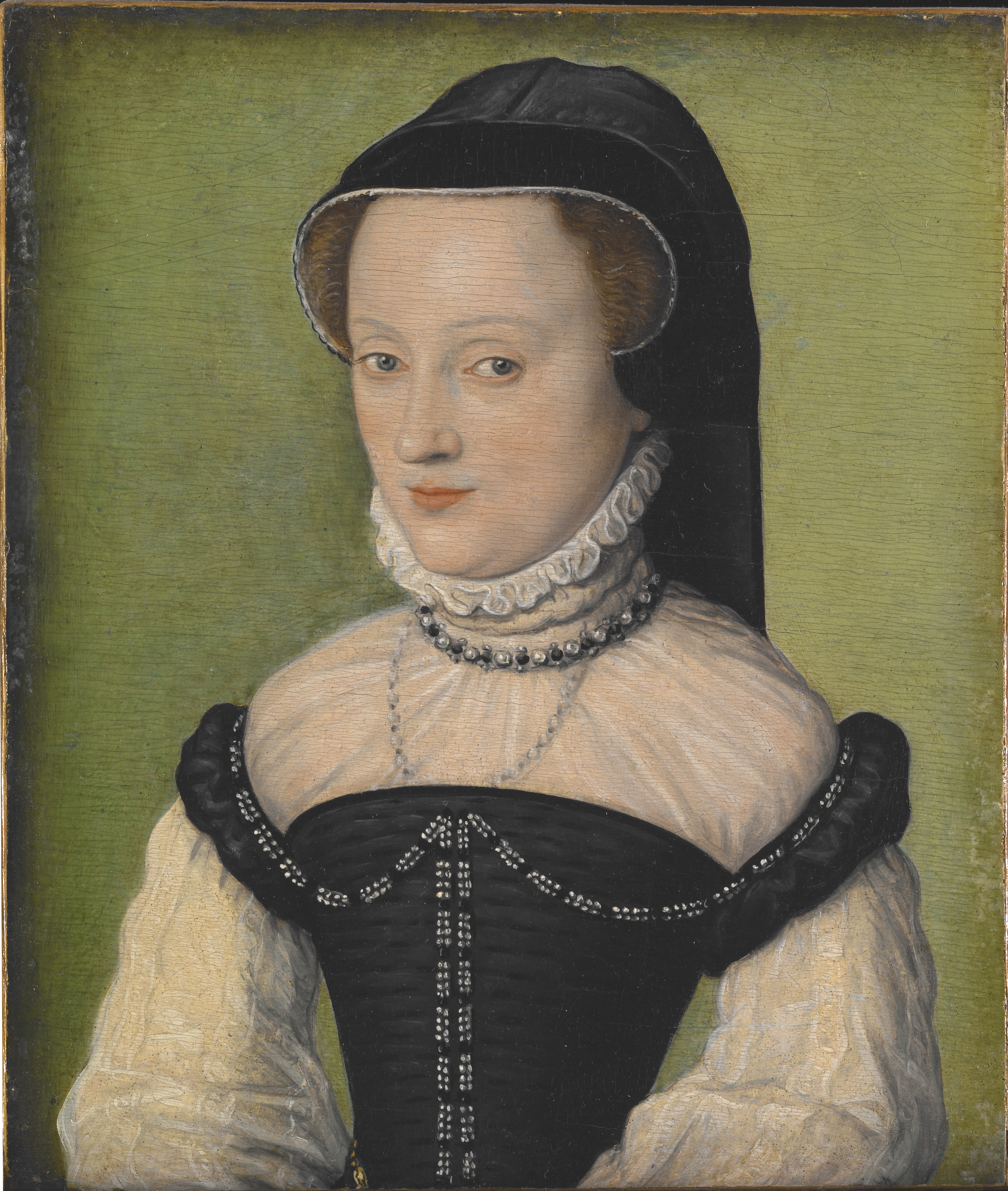
- Portrait by Corneille de Lyon, 1560–1565
- Born: 1530; Brittany, France
- Died: 3 March 1568 (aged 37–38); Orléans, France
- Noble family: Laval
- Spouses: Gaspard de Coligny, Admiral of France
- Issue: Louise de Coligny; François de Coligny, Count of Coligny; Charles de Coligny, Marquis d'Andolet
- Father: Guy XVI de Laval, Count of Laval
- Mother: Antoinette d'Aillon

Charlotte de Laval, Dame de Châtillon (1530 – 3 March 1568), was a French noblewoman from one of the most powerful families in Brittany. She was the first wife of Gaspard de Coligny, Seigneur de Châtillon, Admiral of France and a prominent Huguenot leader during the French Wars of Religion.

== Family ==
Charlotte was born in Brittany, France in 1530, the daughter of Guy XVI de Laval, Count of Laval, head of one of Brittany's most powerful noble families, and Antoinette d'Aillon. She had a half-sister, Anne de Laval, from her father's first marriage to Charlotte of Naples, and a half-brother Guy XVII de Laval, Count of Laval, from her father's second marriage to Anne de Montmorency. Charlotte's father died on 20 May 1531 when she was about a year old. In addition to his many noble titles, he also held the positions of Lieutenant-General and Governor of Brittany, and Admiral of Brittany. Her mother died on 19 April 1538, leaving Charlotte an orphan at the age of eight.

== Marriage and issue ==
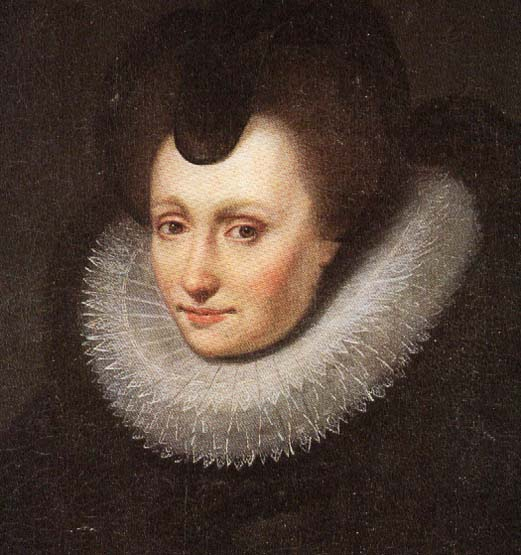
Louise de Coligny, the daughter of Charlotte de Laval and Gaspard de Coligny

On 16 October 1547 at Fontainebleau, Charlotte married Gaspard de Coligny, Seigneur de Châtillon, who would be appointed Admiral of France in 1552. He succeeded Claude d'Annebault as admiral following the latter's death. Their principal residence was the Château de Châtillon-Coligny. Gaspard and Charlotte had three children:

- Louise de Coligny (23 September 1555 – 13 November 1620), married firstly on 26 May 1571 Charles de Téligny, who was killed in the St. Bartholomew's Day Massacre in 1572; on 24 April 1583, she married secondly as his fourth wife William the Silent, Prince of Orange. She had one son by her last marriage, Frederick Henry, Prince of Orange (29 January 1584 – 14 March 1647)
- François de Coligny, Count of Coligny, Seigneur de Châtillon-sur-Loing (28 April 1557 – 8 October 1591), married Marguerite d'Ailly, by whom he had issue.
- Charles de Coligny, Marquis d'Andolet (1564–1632)

== Later life ==
Charlotte's husband was taken prisoner at the Battle of Saint-Quentin in 1557, and was released two years later. It was during his imprisonment in the fortress of L'Ecluse that he avidly read the works of John Calvin and by his release in 1559 he had become a fervent Huguenot.

It has been suggested that she was the "Madame de Curosot", said to be a Huguenot sponsor of the poet Pierre de Bocosel de Chastelard who was executed in Scotland for twice invading the privacy of Mary, Queen of Scots. The name "Curosot" may have a cipher name substituted for "Châtillon" in the original correspondence.

She died on 3 March 1568 in Orléans at the age of thirty-eight. In 1571, Gaspard married secondly Jacqueline de Montbel, by whom he had a posthumous daughter Beatrix, born on 21 December 1572. He had been assassinated four months earlier by paid assassins of Henry I, Duke of Guise allegedly acting under the orders of the French queen mother Catherine de Medici. Immediately upon his death, the St. Bartholomew's Day Massacre commenced, in which Charlotte's son-in-law Charles de Téligny also lost his life.

Through her daughter Louise, Charlotte was the ancestress of King William III of England, Frederick the Great, and the present British Royal Family also directly descends from her.

== Sources ==
- Shimizu, J. (1970). Conflict of Loyalties : Politics and Religion in the Career of Gaspard de Coligny, Admiral of France, 1519-1572. Librairie Droz.
- Strage, Mark (1976), Women of Power, New York and London: Harcourt Brace Jovanovich, ISBN 0-15-198370-4
