= Château de Pierre Scize =

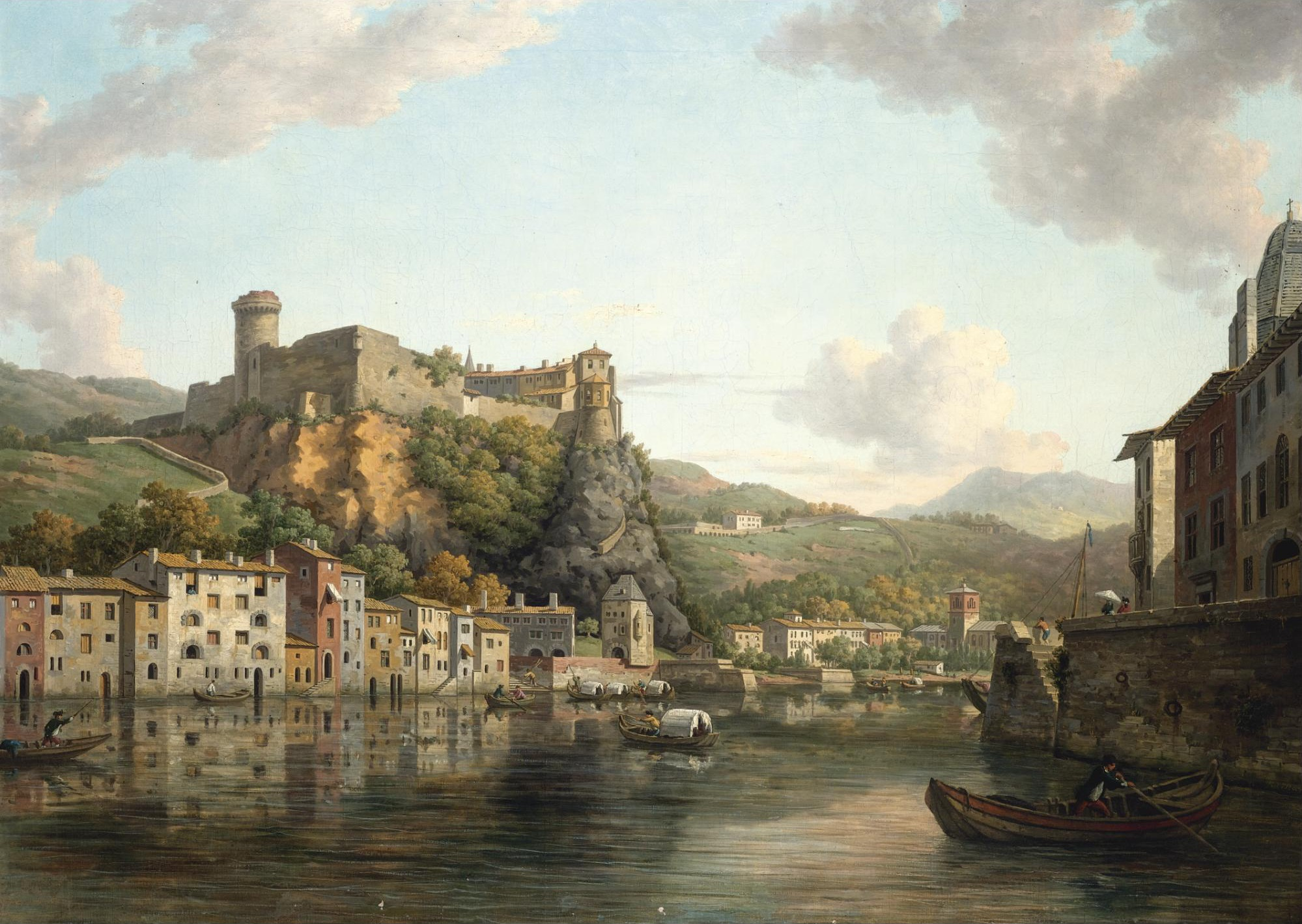
View of the château de Pierre-Scize in Lyon by William Marlow, c.1765-1766.

The Château de Pierre Scize or Château de Pierre Encise was a fortress in Lyon.

It was built on a strategic location in the Middle Ages, facing the Saône at the western entrance to the city, the border between the Holy Roman Empire and the Kingdom of France. Originally home to the archbishop of Lyon, it began to be used as a state prison under Louis XI. The château was demolished in 1793 after the French Revolution.

== Etymology ==
The rocky outcropping on which the Château de Pierre-Scize was built was originally named "Petra incisa," meaning "split stone" or "cut stone," possibly recalling Agrippa's major works to build a Roman road through it.

== Geology ==
The Pierre Scisse outcropping is part of the crystalline base layer on the edge of the Massif Central. On the heights overlooking the château, this granite is covered by the sedimentary massif of the Monts d'Or, with an average altitude of 300 metres, inclined towards the east and shaped into a cuesta which overlooks the Saône river valley. The cuesta slopes almost continuously upward from Fourvière to Millery; this slope corresponds to an exhumed faultline scarp.

The crystalline lowest level is found on the left bank of the Saône at the PierreScize gorge and in the riverbed of the Saône, upstream at Île Barbe. That gorge begins at the same altitude as the church of Saint-Pierre-aux-Liens de Vaise (150 metres downstream of the pont Clémenceau in Lyon), and ends at the same altitude as the Église Saint-Paul.

Farther downstream, at the exit to the Pierre Scize gorge, was an outcrop of the Pierre Scize outcropping, also in the Saône riverbed. According to Clerjon, the Pierre Scize outcropping used to reach as far as the middle of the Saône. It was 85 metres wide by 115 metres long, emerging at around 3 metres above the waterline at average water levels. The central piers of the pont du Change were built against it. Explosives were used to destroy it around 1847.

== Location ==
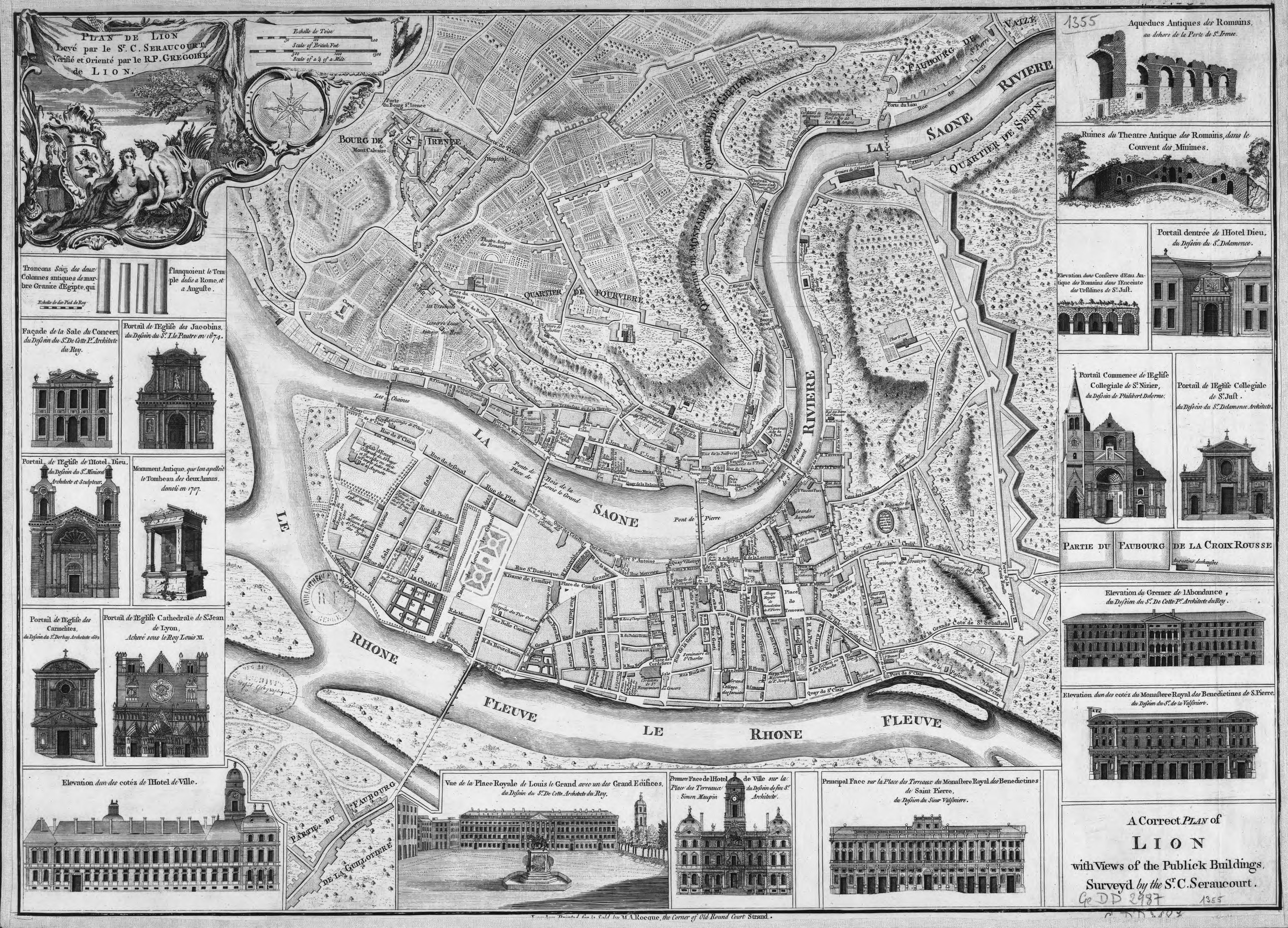
1746 map of the city by Claude Séraucourt, with the fortress towards the top of the map, on the right bank (left side) of the Saône.

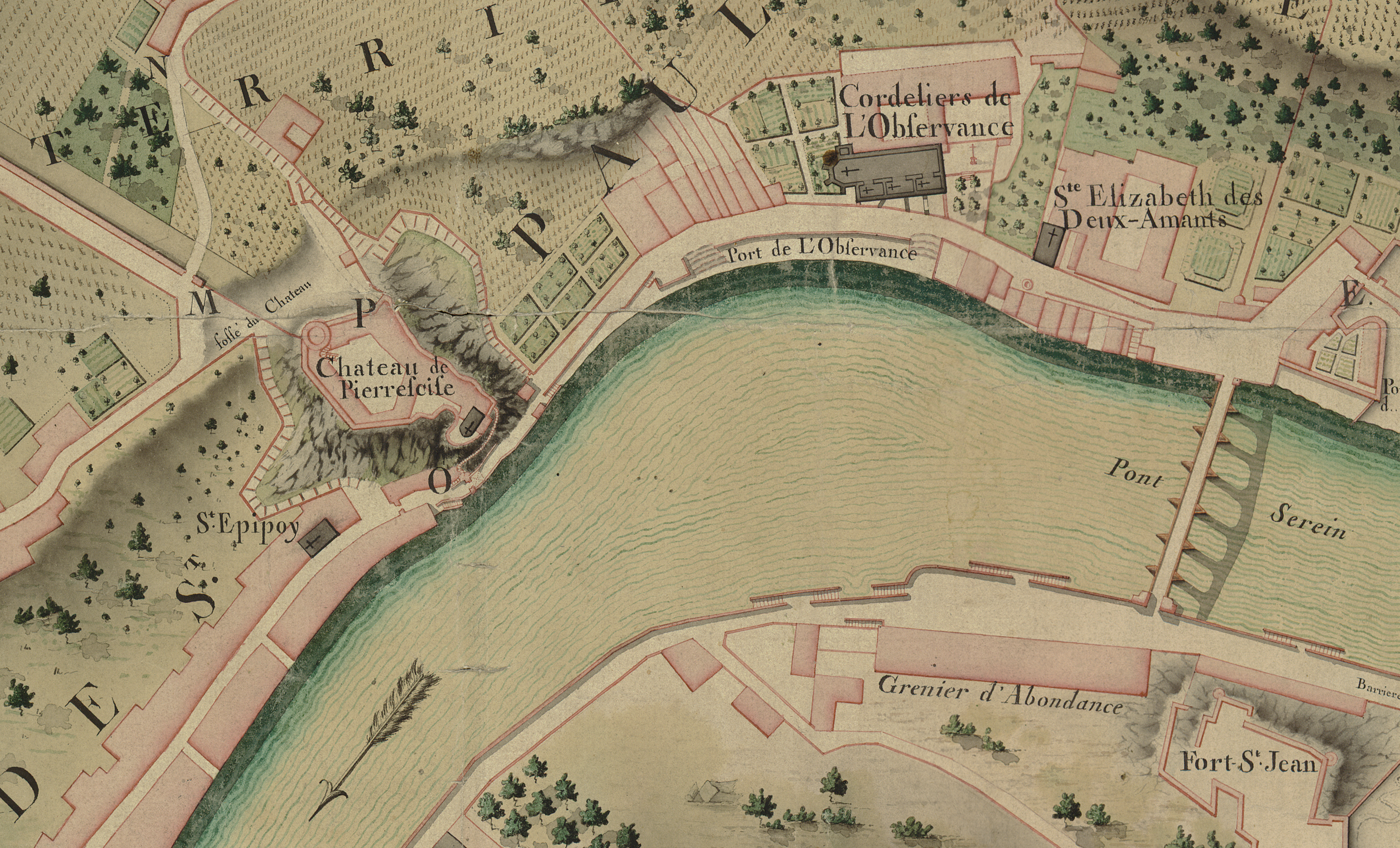
Detail of the Vaise neighbourhood of Lyon in 1789, with the Château de Pierre Scize at middle left.

The château was located on the Pierre Scize rocky outcropping, on the right bank (south side) of the Saône, at the entrance of the Pierre Scize gorge. It was built around fifty metres above the Saône. The château's name has been given to the Pierre Scize wharf, which was built at the foot of the remains of the outcropping.

=== Historical location ===
During the High Middle Ages, the Château de Pierre Scize acted as the fortress for the village of Bourg-Neuf, which was located between the Pierre Scize outcropping and the Église Saint-Paul.

Later, the medieval fortifications of the nearby city of Lyon expanded to include the château, thus integrating it into Lyon's defensive system. The Château de Pierre Scize defended Lyon's western entrance.

== Architecture ==
On the south side of the château, there was a terrace shaded by a large tree. The château drew water from a spring.

Inside the Château de Pierre Scize was the Chappelle (chapel) Saint-Michel, the existence of which was first recorded in 1392.

A staircase descended from the north-east side of the château along the rockface towards the Saône. The staircase ended with a gateway called the Pierre Scize gate, which marked the entrance to a narrow, winding neighbourhood.

== History ==
=== Early history ===
Although the site on which the Château de Pierre Scize would be built had certainly been inhabited since the times of the Roman Empire, records of the existence of the château only appear in the seventh century. According to Poullin de Lumina, the archbishop of Lyon, Hugues de Die, assembled a council of the bishops of his province there in 1099.

Héracle de Montboissier, archbishop of Lyon from 1153 to 1163, sought refuge at the Château de Pierre Scize several times during disputes which neighbouring barons; he was the first to make the château the home of the archbishop of Lyon.

Following several troubled decades, the archbishop of Lyon Renaud de Forez (r. 1193–1226) undertook to thicken the walls of the château and to embellish the interior to fashion it into an archbishop's palace. His successors continued to use the château as their main residence.

When in 1244, at odds with the Emperor Frederick II, Pope Innocent IV stayed in Lyon, Bishop Aymeric stayed at the Château de Pierre Scise.

In 1312, Archbishop Peter of Savoy ceded the jurisdiction of Lyon to the French crown according to the treaty of 10 April with Philip IV. Nevertheless, he secured temporary jurisdiction over the Château de Pierre-Scise and its dependencies. In 1330, the châtelain (keeper) of the château was given the right to command twelve men-at-arms.

In 1335, the governor of the château received 50 Viennese sous per week as compensation for his post; under his command were twelve men-at-arms, each of whom were paid eight florins per month.

The archbishops of Lyon continued to occupy the château: in 1339, Archbishop Guillaume de Sure issued his arbitration awards there, and it was there in 1366 that Archbishop Charles of Alençon excommunicated the seneschal of Lyon and the officers of the king following the unrest generated by the Treaty of Brétigny and the 1364 dissolution of the army.

=== 17th and 18th centuries ===
Under Richelieu Louis XIII made it a royal residence. At the end of the 18th century it was commanded by M. André de Bory and from 1780 by Claude Espérance de Regnauld-Alleman.

== Notable prisoners ==
- Jacques d'Armagnac was imprisoned at the Château de Pierre Scize in 1475 by Louis XI for having participated in the War of the Public Weal; he was then transferred to the Bastille, and was later decapitated.
- Ludovico Sforza, in conflict with Louis XII for the Duchy of Milan, was captured in 1500 by Louis II de la Trémoille et imprisoned at the Château de Pierre Scize before being transferred to the Château de Lys-Saint-Georges. His brother, Cardinal Ascanio Sforza, was also imprisoned at the château. The two were held there for fifteen years.
- The captain of Fenoyl, a Catholic who attempted to resist Protestant troops, was incarcerated in 1562. He was guarded by the baron of Adrets, François de Beaumont.
- François de Beaumont himself was imprisoned in the dungeons of the Château de Pierre Scize in 1570, and was guarded by the captain of Fenoyl.
- Claude de Bauffremont, baron of Sennecey, a member of the Catholic League of France, was imprisoned at the château from 1592. In order to arrange his release, he arranged for his four children to take his place, including his son Henri, a future maréchal de camp.
- Charles de Coligny was incarcerated at the château in 1593.
- Charles Emmanuel de Savoie, Duke of Nemours, imprisoned in September 1593, managed to escape in July 1594.
- Henri Coiffier de Ruzé d'Effiat, Marquis of Cinq-Mars and François-Auguste de Thou were imprisoned at the Château de Pierre Scize in 1642 for plotting against Cardinal Richelieu. They were executed. Frédéric Maurice de La Tour d'Auvergne, Duke of Bouillon, who had been involved in the same plot, was imprisoned at the château with his co-conspirators.
- Philippe de La Mothe-Houdancourt, Marshal of France, was imprisoned on 28 December 1644, interrogated in 1647, and was released in 1648.
- Philippe, Chevalier de Lorraine, the favourite lover of Philippe I, Duke of Orléans, the brother of Louis XIV, was imprisoned at the Château de Pierre Scize in February 1670. He stayed there for very little time, having been transferred to the Château d'If the same month.
- Hennequin, Marquis of Fresne, was imprisoned at the château for having attempted to sell his wife to a privateer.
- François Christophe de Klinglin, the Prêteur Royal of Strasbourg, was imprisoned at the château from 1753 to 1757.
- Charles Albert de Moré de Pontgibaud was imprisoned there by the order of the state from 1753 to 1757.
- Le Donatien Alphonse François, Marquis de Sade was briefly imprisoned at Pierre Scize in 1768.
- David Dombre was imprisoned in the château in 1788, at the age of 16.
- Camille Teisseire, who was close with Montagnards, a political group during the French Revolution, spent a number of days at the château in 1793.

== See also ==
- Lyon
- History of Lyon
- Fort de Loyasse
- Archdiocese of Lyon

== Bibliography ==
- Archives historiques et statistiques du département du Rhône
- Combe, Claire (2007). La ville endormie ? Le risque d’inondation à Lyon — Approche géohistorique et systémique du risque de crue en milieu urbain et périurbain (PhD in geography, planning and urbanism thesis) (in French). Université Lumière Lyon 2.
- Clerjon (1830). Histoire de Lyon, depuis sa fondation jusqu'à nos jours (sur archive.org) (in French). Vol. 3. Lyon: Théodore Laurent.
- Cuaz, Ernest (1907). Le Château de Pierre Scize et ses prisonniers (in French). A. Rey.
- Lurgo, Elisabetta (2018). Philippe d'Orléans : Frère de Louis XIV (in French). Paris: Perrin. ISBN 978-2-262-07516-3.
- C. Pelletier (1980). Châteaux et maisons bourgeoises dans le Rhône (in French). Horvath.
- Pieragnoli, Joan (2025). Le chevalier de Lorraine (in French). Paris: Presses Universitaires de France. ISBN 978-2-13-088138-4.
- Sandras, Gatien de Courtilz (1714). Mémoires de Madame la marquise de Fresne (in French). Amsterdam.
- Vaesen, Joseph; Charavay, Étienne (1887). Lettres de Louis XI, roi de France (in French). Vol. 3 - Lettres de Louis XI, 1465–1469. Paris: libr. Renouard.
- Vaesen, Joseph; Charavay, Étienne (1909). Lettres de Louis XI, roi de France (in French). Vol. 11 - Préface, itinéraire et tables. Paris: libr. Renouard.
- Demarcq, Michel (2012). "Pierre-Scize, la Bastille lyonnaise sous la Révolution". Rive gauche, Société d'études d'histoire de Lyon (in French) (201).
