= Gaspard II de Coligny =

French nobleman and Admiral of France, leader of the Huguenots (1519–1572)

- Seigneur de Châtillon
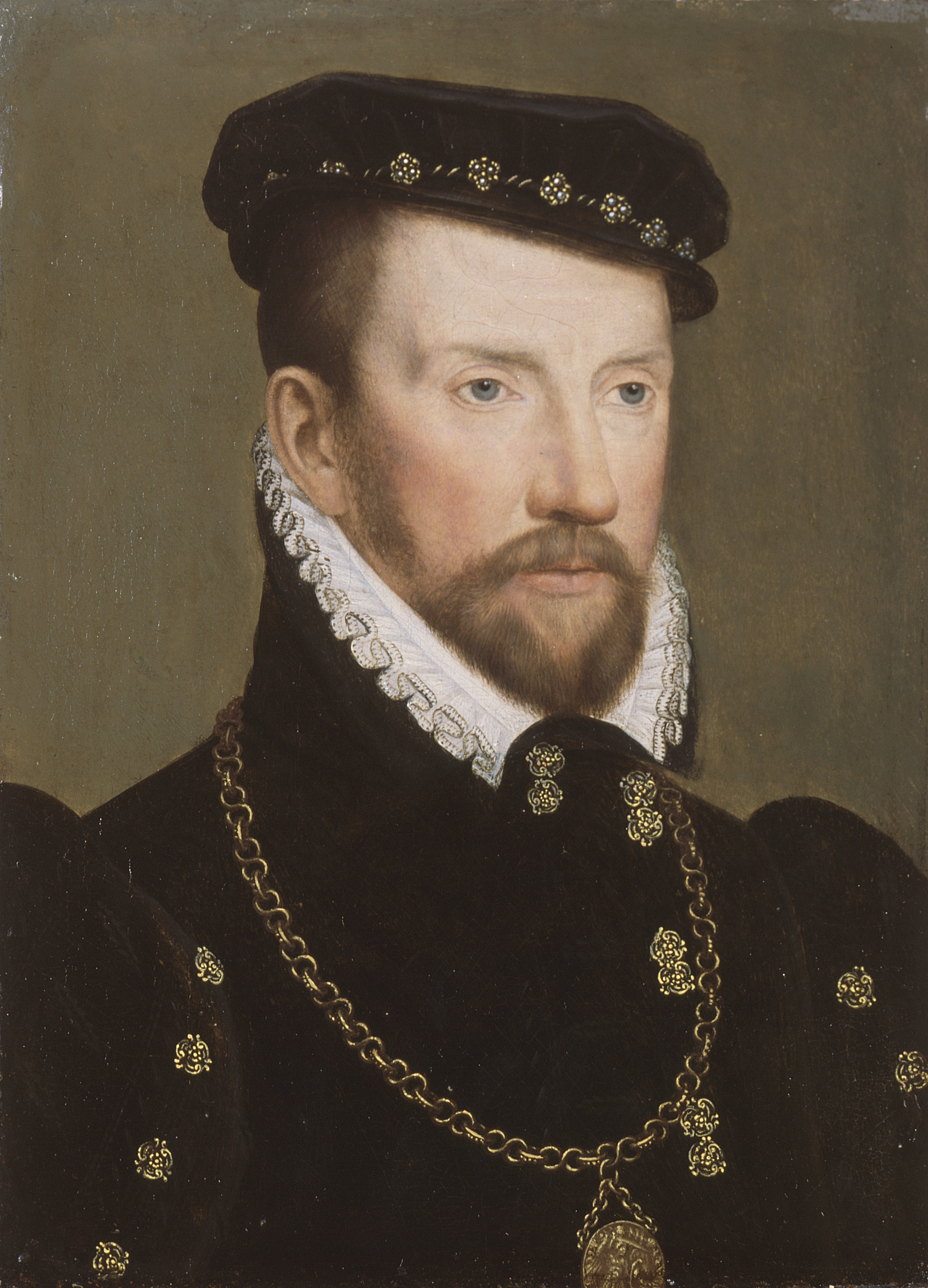
- Portrait by François Clouet, between 1565 and 1570
- Other titles: Admiral of France
- Born: 16 February 1519; Châtillon-sur-Loing, Kingdom of France
- Died: 24 August 1572 (aged 53); Paris, Kingdom of France
- Family: Coligny
- Spouses: Charlotte de Laval (m. 1547; died 1568); Jacqueline de Montbel d'Entremont; (m. 1571)
- Issue: Louise de Coligny; Beatrix de Coligny; François de Coligny; Charles de Coligny
- Father: Gaspard I de Coligny
- Mother: Louise de Montmorency

Gaspard de Coligny, seigneur de Châtillon (French pronunciation: [ɡaspaʁ də kɔliɲi]; 16 February 1519 – 24 August 1572), was a French nobleman, Admiral of France, and Huguenot leader during the French Wars of Religion. He served under kings Francis I and Henry II during the Italian Wars, attaining great prominence both due to his military skill and his relationship with his uncle, the king's favourite Anne de Montmorency. During the reign of Francis II he converted to Protestantism, becoming a leading noble advocate for the Reformation during the early reign of Charles IX.

With the outbreak of civil war in 1562, Coligny joined the Huguenots in their fight against the Crown. He served as a lieutenant to Louis I, Prince of Condé throughout the first two civil wars, before becoming the de facto leader of their military efforts after Condé's death during the third civil war. Due to accusations levelled at him by the assassin of the Catholic François, Duke of Guise, in 1563 the powerful Guise family accused him of responsibility for the assassination, and unsuccessfully tried to bring a case against him. Coligny was assassinated at the start of the St Bartholomew's Day massacre, in 1572, on the orders of Henri I, Duke of Guise, son of François.

== Family and early life ==
Coligny came of a noble family of Burgundy. His family traced their descent from the 11th century, and in the reign of Louis XI, were in the service of the King of France. Gaspard's father, Gaspard I de Coligny, known as the 'Marshal of Châtillon', served in the Italian Wars from 1494 to 1516, married in 1514, and was created Marshal of France in 1516, and from his wife, Louise de Montmorency, sister of the future constable, he had three sons, all of whom played an important part in the first period of the Wars of Religion: Odet, Gaspard and François.

Born at Châtillon-sur-Loing in 1519, Gaspard was raised by Louise de Montmorency and his uncle Anne after the death of his father in 1522. Louise ensured he received an education at the hands of Nicolas Bérauld. Under Bérauld's guidance he studied the classics, including Cicero and Ptolemy. Both Bérauld and Louise came from a humanist background and had friendships with Protestant figures, such as Louis de Berquin and Michelle de Saubonne, and it was in this milieu that Coligny grew up.

== Reign of Francis I ==
Coligny distinguished himself in the campaign of 1543 where he was wounded at the sieges of Montmédy and Bains. In 1544 he served in the Italian campaigns under the Count of Enghien, commanding a regiment, and was knighted on the Field of Ceresole. Returning to France, he took part in different military operations, including Strozzi's expedition to England in 1545.

== Reign of Henri II ==
=== Return of Montmorency ===
Upon the accession of the dauphin Henri II, Montmorency returned to favour from disgrace, and Coligny quickly benefitted, being made colonel-general of the infantry a month into Henri's reign. He exhibited great capacity and intelligence as a military reformer, the regulations he drew up for maintaining infantry discipline being formally sanctioned by the king in 1551. Shortly thereafter he was further elevated with a position as a Knight of the Order of St. Michel. That year he married Charlotte de Laval (d. 1568).

=== Advancement ===
At this time he was close friends with two of the other leading men at court François, Duke of Guise and Piero Strozzi. Office continued to flow to him due to his uncle's close relationship with the king. In 1549 he was made sous-lieutenant of the Boulonnais, and then Boulogne-sur-Mer a year later. In 1551, he was made Governor of Paris, a much coveted office. A year later he followed this acquisition with that of the title of Admiral, inherited from the recently deceased Claude d'Annebaut. This post had little to do with naval affairs, but was second in prestige behind that held by his uncle Constable Montmorency. With war resumed in 1552 Coligny as Colonel-General of the infantry played a key role under Guise's command in the French victory at Battle of Renty. Dispute between Coligny and Guise over who deserved credit for the victory almost ended in the drawing of swords, before Henri II oversaw the kiss of peace between them. Nevertheless their friendship was jeopardised. In a testament to the extreme favour he was in at court, in 1555 he was awarded a second governorship, that of the important border district of Picardy, replacing the first prince of the blood Antoine of Navarre much to his frustration.

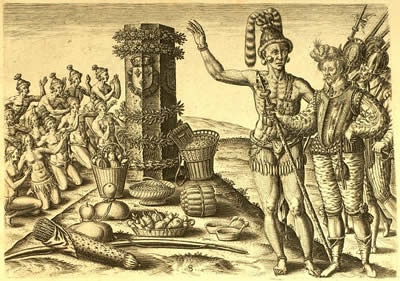
Athore, son of the Timucuan king Saturiwa, showing Laudonnière the monument placed by Jean Ribault in 1562.

In 1555, under the leadership of his friend and navy colleague, Vice-Admiral Nicolas Durand de Villegaignon, he attempted to establish the colony of France Antarctique in Rio de Janeiro. They were afterwards expelled by the Portuguese, in 1567. His combined efforts with those of his uncle, persuaded Henri to attain the 5 year truce, which he would do at Vaucelles in February 1556. During 1556 however, he would lose his governorship of the capital to François de Montmorency, whom Henri had promised Anne would receive it.

=== Resumption of hostilities ===
With war resumed in late 1556, Coligny made an abortive surprise attack on Douai on 6 January, timed to coincide with the feast of Epiphany. With this a failure, he changed course, sacking Lens, Pas-de-Calais, ravaging the frontier and returning with plunder. Henri, frustrated at the timing of the attack, ordered Coligny to return prisoners and goods taken in the raid on 17 January, much to the Admiral's anger. In 1557 he was entrusted with the defence of Saint-Quentin which was besieged by a Spanish army that had come down from Flanders. With the crushing defeat of the relief army under Montmorency at the battle of Saint-Quentin Coligny assured the king he had supplies to hold the town for eight weeks. However 9 days later on 29 August, the Spanish would break the town's defences, and he was imprisoned in the stronghold of L'Ecluse. His brother Francois de Coligny d'Andelot had also been among the town's defenders. However, he managed to escape. The king harshly criticised Coligny for failing to hold the town for longer. The condition of his imprisonment was harsh, the dampness and cold leaving him ill. On payment of a ransom of 50,000 crowns he recovered his liberty.

=== Coligny and Calvinism ===
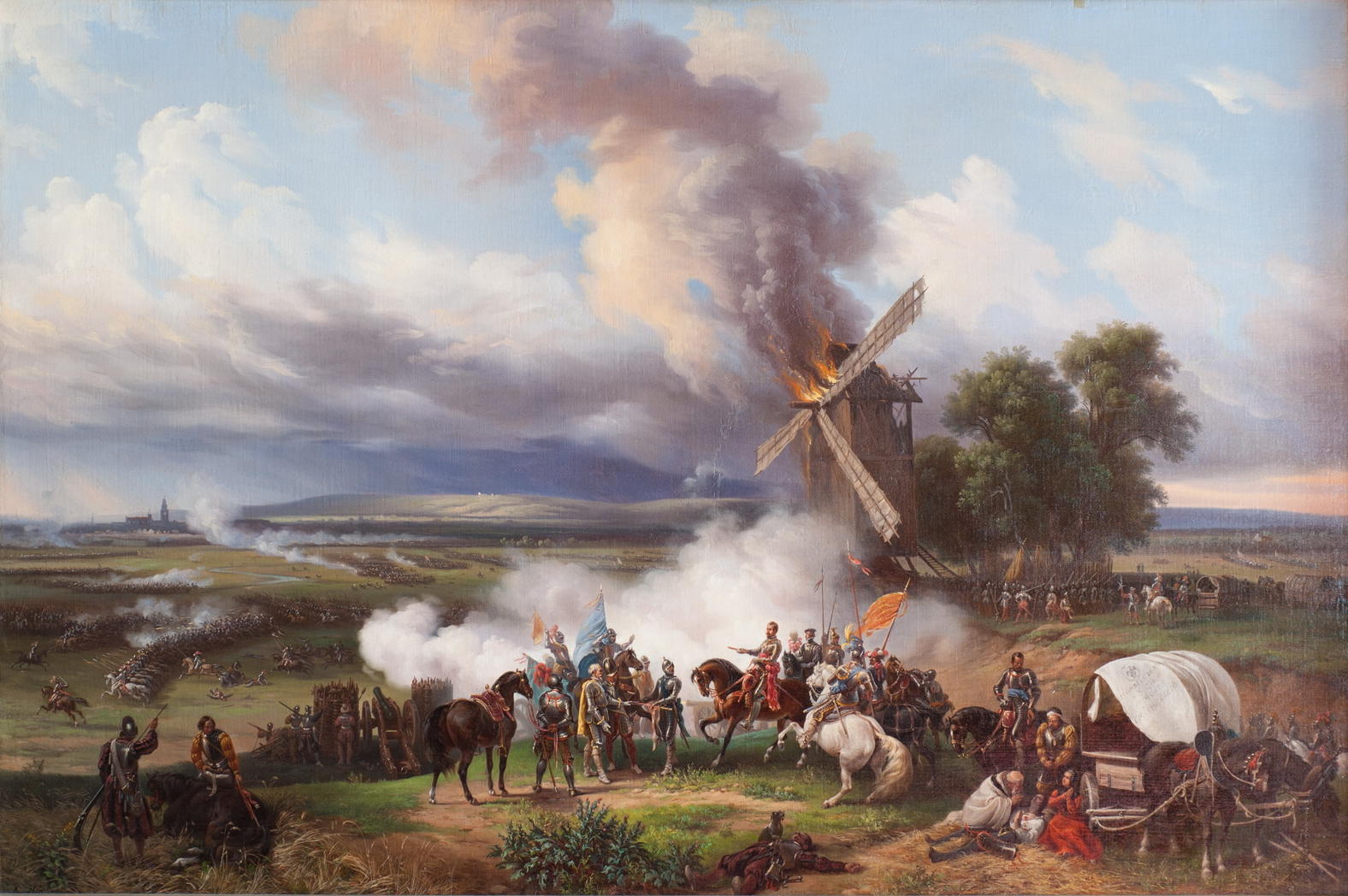
Spanish victory at the Battle of Saint-Quentin. Shortly after which Coligny would be captured and held prisoner for 2 years

Throughout this period, Protestantism was beginning to find converts in the upper echelons of the French aristocracy. Coligny's brother Andelot was an early convert, bringing the faith back with him from his captivity in Milan in 1556. He would not however be open in his newfound faith until attending services in 1558. In 1558, while imprisoned in Flanders, Andelot sent a Protestant devotional book, as a way to console his brother during his time in captivity. The timing of Coligny's conversion to Calvinism is unclear, but by September 1558 he had received a letter about his salvation from Calvin. The priest Viret spoke highly of Coligny, praising him as a man of Christian virtue. Coligny's religious allegiance was suspect at court by 1559, the English ambassador noting his absence at Mass. For the moment though Coligny maintained public silence on the matter.

== Reign of Francis II ==
=== Amboise ===
Following the sudden death of Henri, at a joust to commemorate the Peace of Cateau-Cambrésis, he participated in the conference between the House of Bourbon and House of Montmorency at Vendôme, to negotiate their respective places in the new order. The conference would achieve little, except for ending a Montmorency feud with the House of Bourbon-Montpensier and both families would be outmanoeuvred by the Guise. Frustrated at the loss of his pre-eminence, Montmorency withdrew from court. When he was approached to partake in the Conspiracy of Amboise Coligny rebuffed the advances, being on good terms with Guise, even staying at his palace in Nanteuil during the Autumn of 1559. In January 1560 he resigned his governorship of Picardy, frustrated his request for funding of fortifications for several towns had been denied. Coligny visited court in February to gain details about a possible operation in support of Mary of Guise in Scotland against Elizabeth I. It was this endeavour that consumed Coligny and Andelot during the period of the conspiracy. In the wake of the conspiracy, Coligny wrote to Catherine, lending his support to the Edict of Amboise (1560).

=== Assembly of Notables ===
In April, Coligny was sent to Normandy to continue preparations for the Scottish campaign. Conscious of the failure of prior religious policy, and seeking a new direction for the country, Coligny was among those who pressured for the calling of an Assembly of Notables in late 1560. When the assembly met at Fontainebleau, hostility emerged between Coligny and François de Guise after Coligny derailed the Guise plans for the summit by proposing coexistence between Protestantism and Catholicism, presenting the assembly with 50,000 signatures. Coligny argued there could not be tranquillity and order in the realm, unless such a step was taken, on at least a temporary basis, until a religious council could sort out matters. Guise snapped back that it was best to leave such church matters to more learned men. Lorraine retorted he could find one million signatures for a counter-petition. Lorraine however went on to strike a softer tone, arguing that the faiths should be brought back together through reform and the summit ended with an agreement to call a council. Coligny was among those in the assembly who argued in favour of an estates general, decrying the seclusion of the king from his people. While Coligny had failed to win over the assembly, he had marked himself out as the most eloquent leader of the reform party.

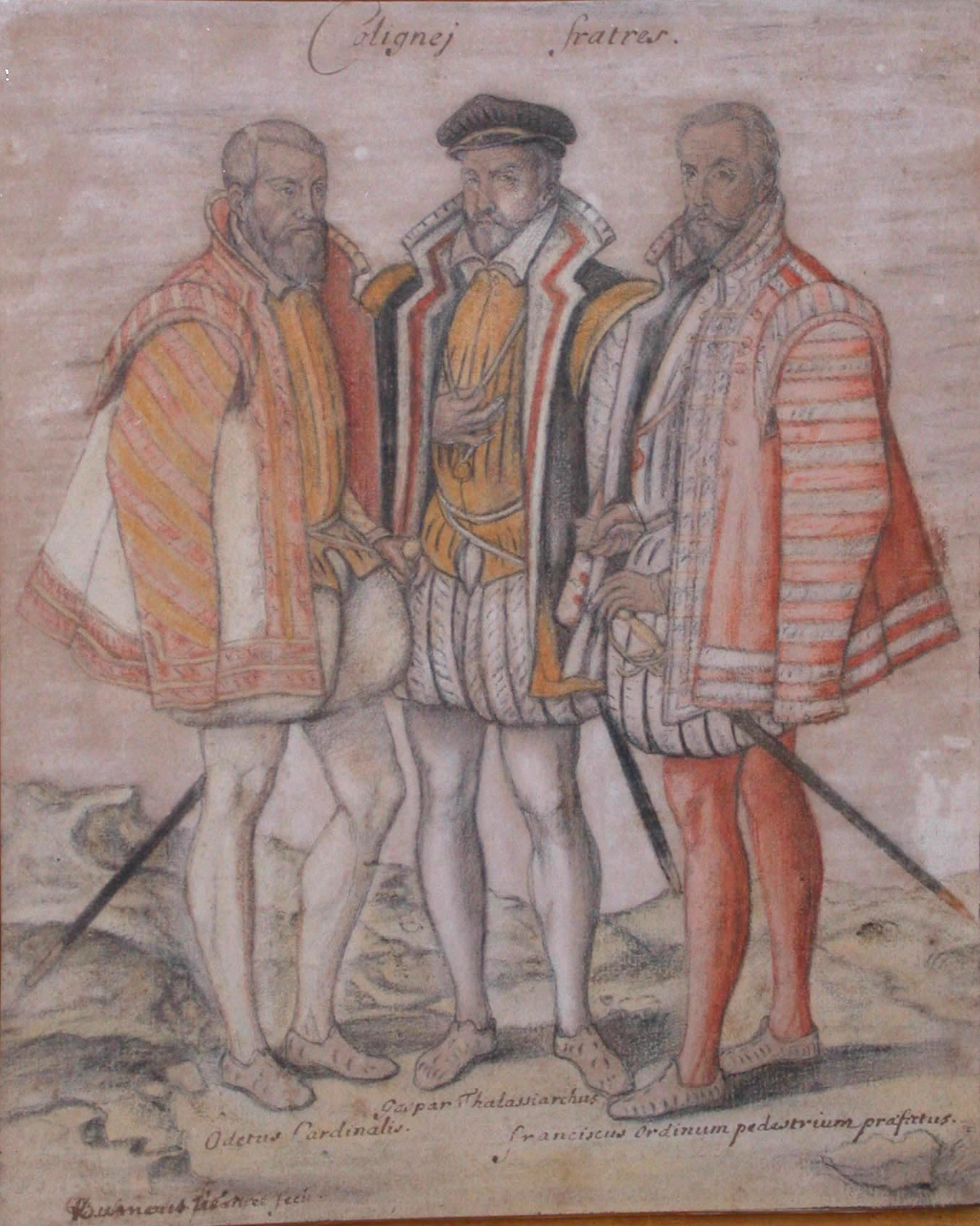
The Three Chatillon brothers: Odet de Coligny, Gaspard II and François de Coligny d'Andelot

=== Condé crisis and the death of Francis II ===
In September, the Châtillons and Montmorency, troubled by the disturbances that still plagued France in the wake of Amboise, withdrew to their estates. On 4 October he was appointed governor of Honfleur and Le Havre. His family would play no part in the arrest of Condé for his involvement in the Lyon conspiracy. In November, Francis II became sick, troubled by an ear infection, which gradually worsened until the king died on 5 December. With the death of Francis, the Guise's hold on government collapsed. Coligny celebrated their misfortune.

Several days after the king's death, Coligny and the duke of Guise got into a fierce argument. News of an uprising in Brittany had arrived at court. Coligny proposed understanding the rising's motives before acting, enraging Guise, who felt motive was irrelevant when they were violating the king's edicts. Guise lashed out at Coligny, saying to those present, were it not for the dignity of the court, he would have stabbed Coligny.

== Reign of Charles IX ==
=== Early reign ===
==== Estates General ====
The estates began their deliberations on the packages proposed by the government in December. Coligny, in attendance, faced criticism for his recent proposals at the Assembly of Notables, with one delegate rising to say that the king ought to punish those who had presented the petition to him about Protestant rights to worship. Coligny, outraged at this attack protested to the king and Catherine, and shortly thereafter the speaker apologised, asserting he had of course, not meant the Admiral. The situation at court was much changed from the Guise regime, with Montmorency returning to the centre, and the Guise influence on the wane. Despite this decline in Guise fortunes, Catherine was not inclined to elevate the Montmorency or Châtillon to the place that they had filled, preferring to balance the various noble houses.

==== Growth in influence ====
Coligny found himself at the centre of Protestant hopes for the new administration, a new petition being brought through him to Catherine asking for permission for Protestant services to be held in private houses. It would however be rejected. Coligny increased in confidence in his new religion in the coming year, his son being baptised in the Protestant fashion in February 1561. Some time early in the year he also appointed a Protestant minister to his household. At the same time as he was becoming more openly Protestant, his political fortunes rose with Catherine's regency. On 15 March the estates of the Prévóté of Paris were recommending him to be the supervisor of the young king's education. In the same month he was admitted into the Conseil des Affairs where royal policy was formulated.

==== Overextension ====
On 1 April, Palm Sunday, Coligny hosted in his apartments a large Protestant service, throwing open his doors. In attendance was Condé with a large retinue, among other nobles. This aroused the disgust of Montmorency and Guise who protested to Catherine. Both she, and the Constable would reprimand Coligny for this audacious move. A few days later there would be further outrage, when, on Easter Sunday, Montmorency and Guise learned that Jean de Monluc would be giving the sermon. Tiring of hearing critiques of their cherished practices the two descended into the servants quarters to hear an obscure friar instead. Delighted at this reconciliation between the two bitter rivals, Cardinal Tournon oversaw the kiss of peace between the two grandees. Montmorency warned Coligny there could be no repeat of the events of Palm Sunday. In the subsequent days, both left court with their retinues, leaving Catherine and Coligny isolated.

==== Toleration ====
Coligny's support for Catherine's regency delivered fruit when the prorogued estates provided their consent to her governance in September 1561. Coligny initially held out hope for the success of the Colloquy of Poissy that met to discuss the religious question in the same month. However, he found himself frustrated by the intractability of both sides, covering his face when Beza remarked that the body of Christ was as far from the sacrament bread as heaven was from earth. While Navarre, Lorraine and the queen regent were trying to push a compromise to the religious question through the Confession of Augsburg in October, Coligny played little part. Throughout late 1561, Coligny continued to lobby the crown for the allowance of public worship. All the while he, and other Protestants at courts continued to attend Calvinist service. In the final weeks of 1561, Coligny's brother Andelot was invited into the Conseil des Affairs further heightening the Protestant character of the government. This was followed, in mid January 1562 later by the seismic Edict of Saint-Germain which legalised on at least a temporary basis public Protestant worship under certain conditions across the kingdom. Synods and consistories would also be legal under royal supervision. Such an edict was the culmination of what Coligny had been pushing for throughout 1561. In early 1562 Coligny again tried to support a colonial venture, this time the colony of Fort Caroline in Spanish Florida led by Jean Ribault, it would prove a failure.

==== Road to civil war ====
The edict of Saint-Germain was the final straw for the lieutenant general, Navarre, who broke with the regency and urged Guise to hurry back so they could represent a united front against Catherine's policy. Having lost Navarre, Catherine's government was left with only the Châtillons and Condé as a basis for support. Conscious of the increasing hostility, Coligny in turn withdrew from court to his estates on 22 February, abandoning Catherine. On his way back to Paris, the Duke of Guise's men were responsible for a massacre at the town of Wassy. Arriving in Paris on 16 March to a hero's welcome for his deeds, Condé heavily outnumbered in the city by the dukes men, would depart on 23 March. The prince headed to Orléans, where, on 2 April he raised the standard of rebellion, seizing the city and issuing a manifesto denouncing the 'imprisonment of the king'. Coligny had linked up with him several days prior, their forces conjoining at Meaux on 27 March. He wrote to Catherine at this time, defending the arming of his men as being customary for a gentleman, and suggested they were necessary due to 'Guise's designs against him.'

=== First War ===
==== Momentum ====
With the outbreak of civil war, many cities across France rose up and declared themselves for Condé's cause. These included Rouen, Tours, Blois, Lyon. During the initial months of conflict, the crown was caught on the back foot, and much negotiation followed in the coming months. Coligny defended his support of the rebellion in letters to both Catherine and his uncle Montmorency, castigating the Constable for allying himself with his family's enemy, the Guise. By June the royal army was ready to take the offensive, their main force marching on Orléans, causing Condé to disperse his troops to avoid them being pinned down in a siege. With the threat on the capital removed and Blois recently retaken, the royal army dispersed flying columns to clear the area around Paris. The main force marched on Bourges, quickly reducing it in early September. Condé and Coligny meanwhile, had been negotiating the Treaty of Hampton Court (1562) with Queen Elizabeth; which offered Le Havre to the queen, in return for military support. Coligny's knowledge of this particular term of the treaty is a matter of scholarly debate. Condé and Coligny created a shadow state, assigning Soubise as governor of Lyonnais and Saint-Gemne as governor of Poitiers among others.

==== Rouen ====
News of these negotiations persuaded the royal army to move north into Normandy, to seize the critical town of Rouen from the rebels. Meanwhile Coligny's brother Andelot was in Germany, raising a force of mercenaries to return Condé's force to numerical parity with that of the crown. On returning into France, he outmanoeuvred the attempts of Saint André to intercept him, linking up with Coligny and Condé in Orléans. The main royal force meanwhile succeeded in reducing Rouen after a lengthy siege, though at the cost of their overall nominal commander Navarre who was wounded, and died on his way back to Paris.

==== Dreux ====
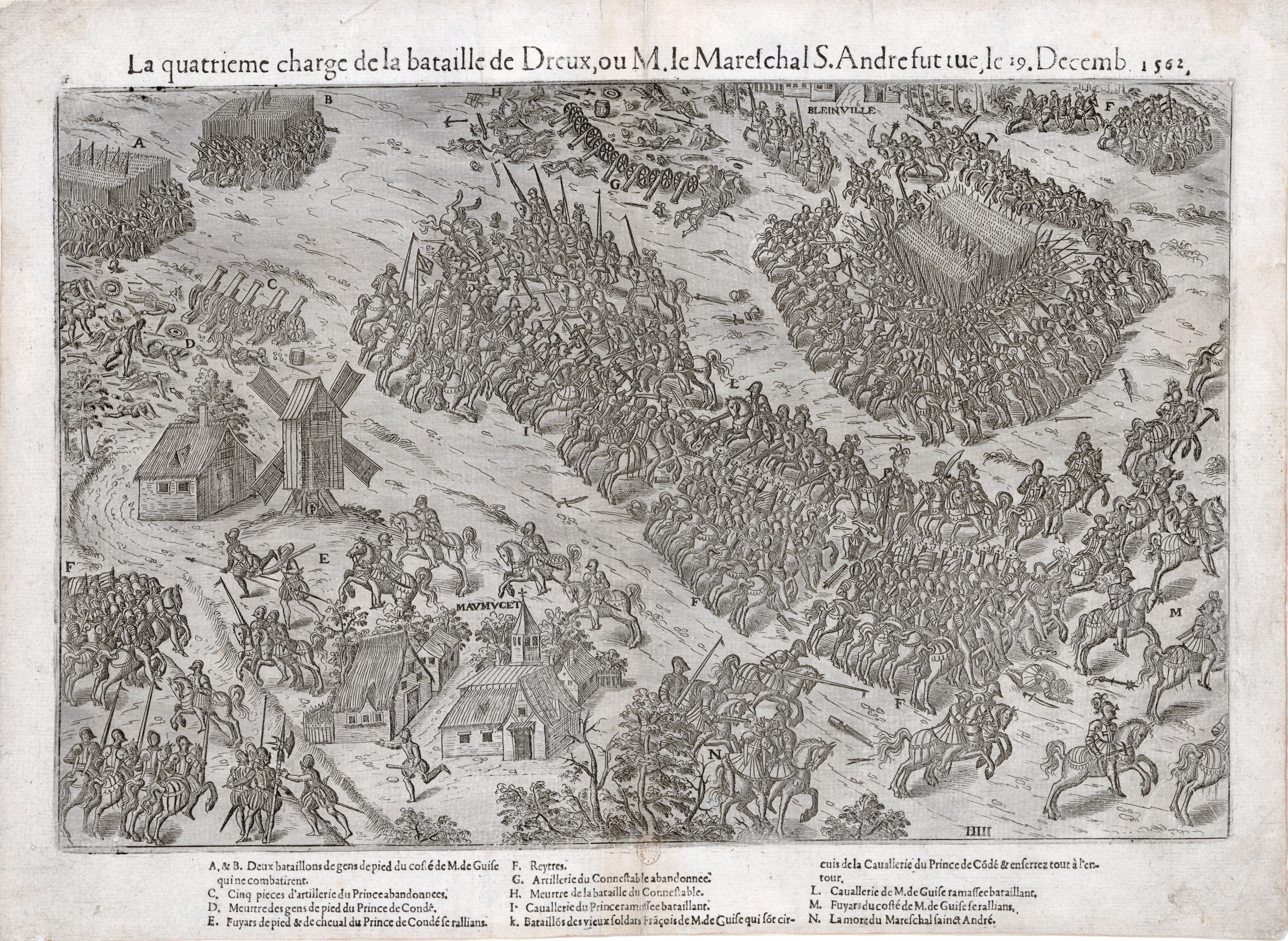
Admiral Coligny's final charge against Guise and Saint-André's gendarmes and the veteran infantry square

Condé now advocated for marching on Paris, hoping a decisive thrust at the capital could turn the tide of the war. Coligny meanwhile proposed marching their forces up into Normandy, reclaiming the lost towns there, and receiving the money they were owed by Elizabeth to keep their troops paid. As overall commander Condé took the army on a march south. The royal army shadowed their approach, and after some delays, pushed them north into Normandy, where the two sides met at the major pitch battle of the war Dreux. The battle would be bloody for both sides, with both Condé and Montmorency being captured at various stages, and Saint-André slain. Guise would lead the crown to victory but Coligny would be able to lead the cavalry off the field in a successful retreat back to Orléans. Through January Coligny begged Elizabeth to provide the promised infantry and money in repeated letters to little effect.

==== Normandy ====
Leaving Andelot in charge of Orléans as Guise moved in to besiege the city, Coligny marched north with some of the remaining forces at their disposal to seize back Normandy. Finally able to secure 8000 crowns from his English allies to pay his mutinous troops, he captured first Caen and then Bayeux while the only royal forces in the region were tied down sieging Le Havre. Soon though peace, negotiated by the captive Condé and Montmorency was declared.

=== Long peace ===
==== Feud ====
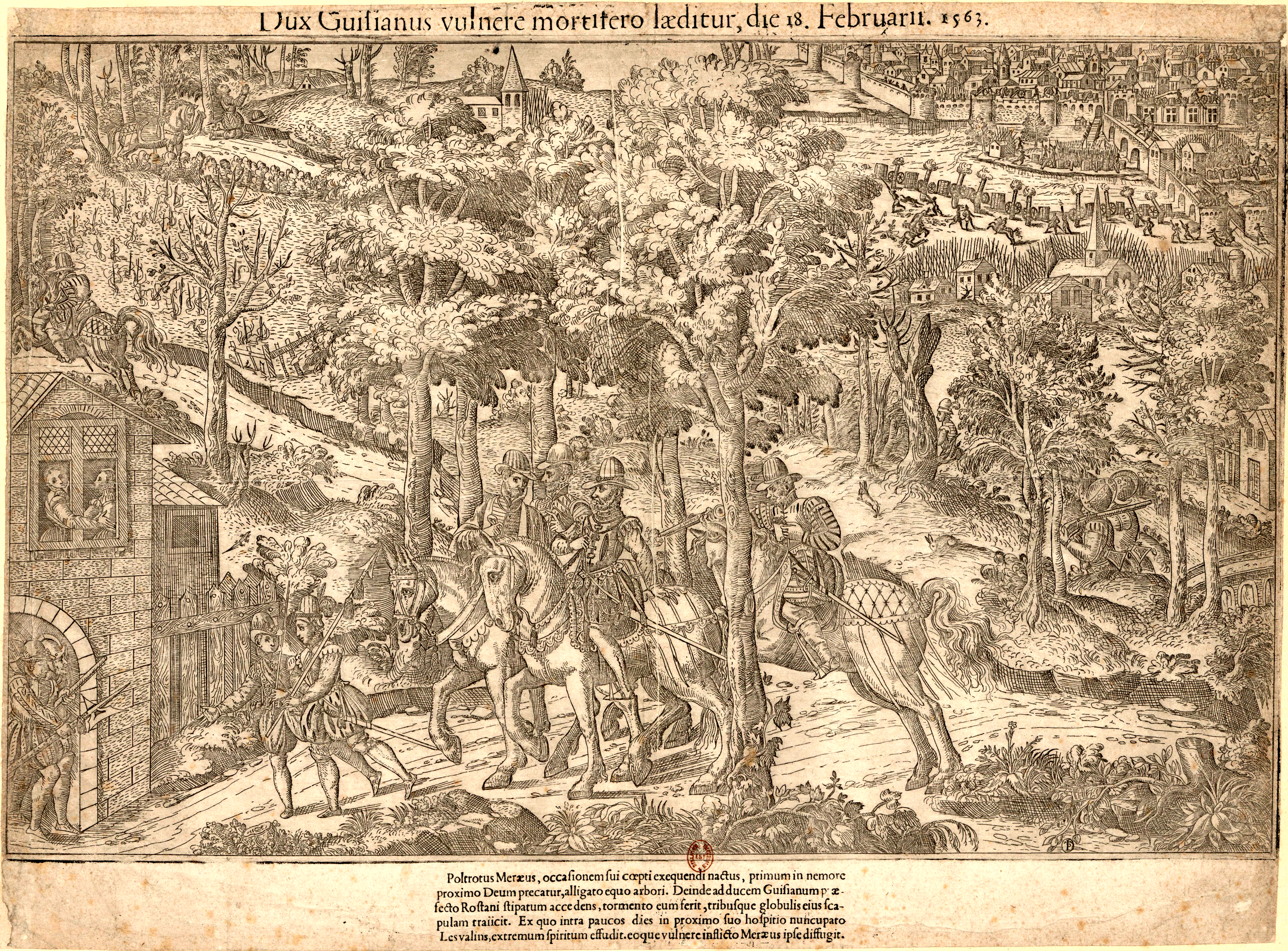
Assassination of François, Duke of Guise on 18 February 1563

As the siege of Orléans reached its climax in early 1563, with reports that Guise's victory was imminent, the Protestant assassin Poltrot de Méré infiltrated the dukes camp, and fatally wounded him. As Guise died, so too did the momentum of the siege. Poltrot would be caught, and under torture implicated Coligny, his story evolving and shifting between tortures, occasionally denying Coligny's involvement. Coligny, up in Normandy, learnt of the Duke's death on 28 February, but did not find out about Poltrot's accusations for some further days. On 12 March he demanded a chance to cross examine Poltrot, to disprove these accusations. However Poltrot was hurriedly executed on 18 March, so that he would not be covered by the amnesty featured in the Edict of Amboise.

Poltrot's testimony would inflame the Guise who angrily called for vengeance. Condé and Montmorency defended Coligny at council on 15 May. With the support of the Montmorency, the old power struggle between Guise and Montmorency was sparked once more. The Guise family planned an offensive against Coligny, launching a private suit on 26 April 1563. To ensure an appropriately partisan judge was chosen to manage the suit, the family brought a large retinue to pressure the Paris Parlement into selecting appropriately. This victory against Coligny would be short lived, as the king evoked the case to the royal council, denying the Parlement jurisdiction. Shortly thereafter the council suspended judgement until the king came of age, and ordered both parties to suspend their hostilities. In November, Coligny responded in kind, entering Paris in force with a large host of his supporters. Fearing the two sides might come to blows Catherine summoned both to the Louvre on 6 December to try and calm things down. Throughout December however there would be isolated acts of violence perpetrated by both sides. At last on 5 January 1564 the king took more definitive action, suspending judgement on the case for a further 3 years in a crushing blow to the Guise.

Seeing their fortunes ebb the Guise took a new approach to their feud, trying to build a non confessional base of support, bringing Condé on side against the 'upstart' Montmorency. With him on side, the Guise planned a triumphal entry in force to Paris, which under its governor Francois de Montmorency was a Montmorency powerbase. Ignoring his insistence that arms were not allowed in the city, Lorraine and the young Henri I, Duke of Guise entered in force; their retinue clashing with that of the Montmorency in a bloody failure. Humiliated Lorraine and Guise retreated to their residence, where they were taunted even by Catholic Parisians.

In early January 1566 Lorraine travelled to the court at Moulins to appeal for proceedings against Coligny, characterising himself as a defender of the princes against this house that was the son of a baron. The princes at court voted against Lorraine's motion, and the crown was able to compel Lorraine and Coligny to exchange the kiss of peace. This was confirmed in a declaration of Coligny's innocence established in edict on 29 January 1566.

==== Peace ====
Coligny took no part in the negotiations of the Edict of Amboise, and blamed Condé for failing to achieve a settlement that took advantage of what he felt was their advantageous position. He would remain largely uninvolved in the interpretative declarations that modified the peace over the next several years. He turned his attention to international enterprises, first concerning the colonial project in Florida, and then commercial activity in the North Sea. These enterprises would come to little. Having largely been absent from court over the prior years, Coligny began to appear there more frequently from 1566. In 1566 Francisque and André d'Albaigne submitted to Coligny projects for establishing relations with the Austral lands. Although he gave favourable consideration to these initiatives, they came to naught.

==== Meaux ====
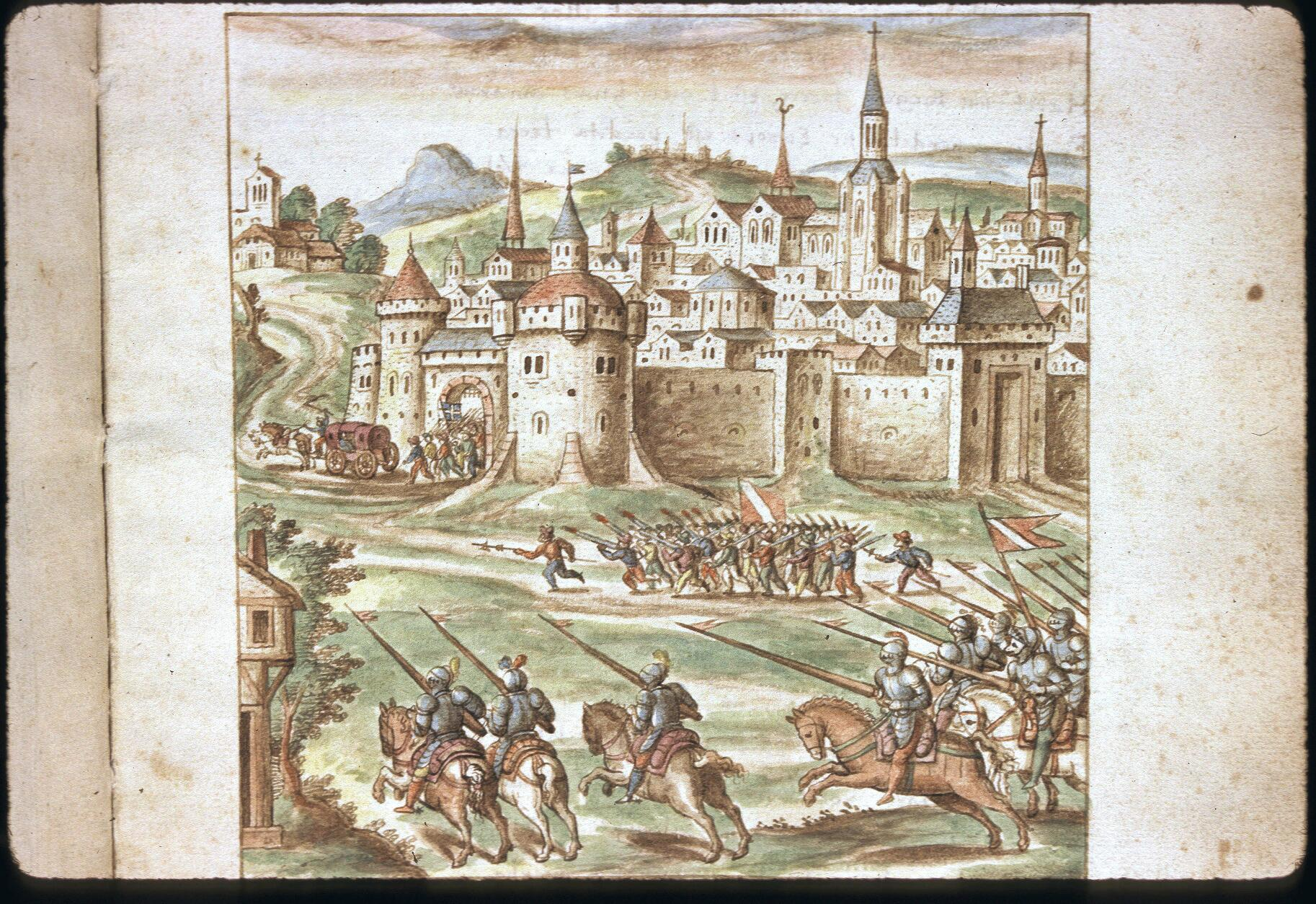
Coligny and Louis I, Prince of Condé attempt to seize the king in the Surprise of Meaux

Tensions between the leading Huguenots and the crown escalated in 1567 as a result of several key factors. Firstly the modifications to the edict of Amboise, which in 1567 included an expansion of the prohibition on Protestantism from Paris to the Île-de-France region. The main impetus would however be Spain. Rumours had been swirling in Huguenot circles that Alba's meeting with Catherine in 1566 during the royal tour, had not in fact been to discuss marriage proposals, but in fact, to plot the destruction of French Huguenots. When news reached the court that Alba was marching north along the Spanish Road to crush a Protestant uprising in the Spanish Netherlands Huguenots and Catholics alike were alarmed. The crown decided to hire 6000 Swiss to protect the country, in case Alba turned his army on the kingdom. However, the Protestant nobles claimed these Swiss were to be used in conjunction with Alba's forces for the genocidal operation. Coligny, having been passed over in favour of Filippo di Piero Strozzi to lead the mercenaries, joined Condé in leaving court.

Meeting away from court, the leading Protestant nobles minds turned to conspiracy. At a conference at Coligny's chateau, in which Condé, the Coligny brothers, Rochefoucauld and other leading nobles were present Andelot argued strongly for taking military action. Coligny meanwhile championed the path of caution, but was eventually won over by the much larger war party. With a direction agreed, the conference turned to planning specifics, with risings to take place in each baillage, the king to be seized at Meaux and Lorraine to be killed.

While the plan would be a better kept secret than Amboise, word would eventually leak out, and the court, having heard of cavalry being assembled in the nearby villages, made a plan to head for Paris in the night quickly. Caught off guard by this sudden withdrawal Condé and Coligny pursued with only a third of the cavalry they had intended to bring, thrice charging at the phalanxes of Swiss that guarded the king as he fled, never able to break their line, forcing them to retreat. The king was safe, if furious in Paris, and the rebels were left with a dilemma of how to proceed.

=== Second War ===
==== Paris ====
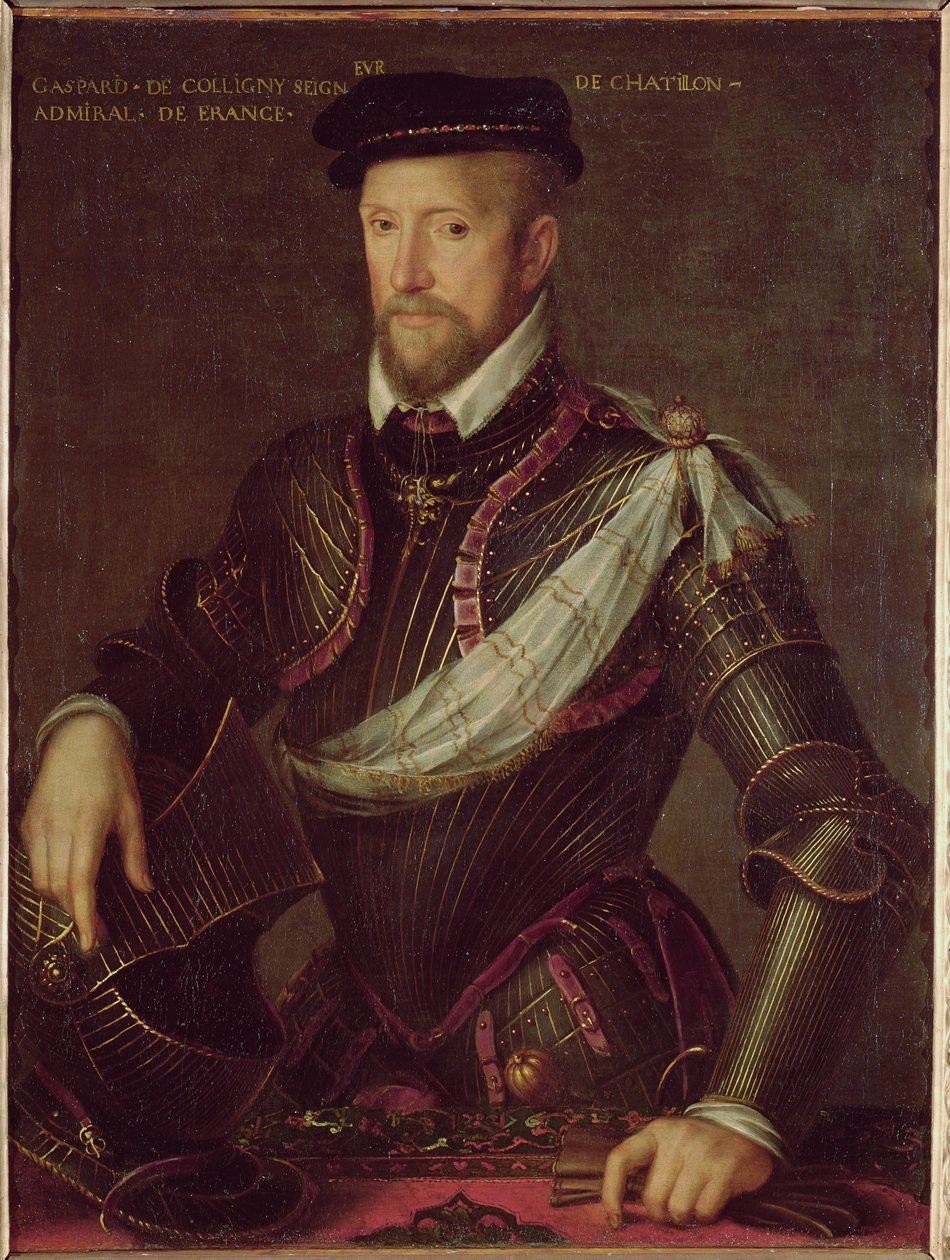
16th century painting of Gaspard II de Coligny, Admiral of France

Hoping not to waste the initiative of the attack, Condé decided to starve Paris into submission, hoping he could capture the king in this more involved fashion. The rebels quickly captured several strategic points around Paris from Charenton-le-Pont to Argenteuil to tighten his grip on the capital. Confident in his position, he negotiated with the crown aggressively, demanding the repeal of all taxes established since the time of Louis XII the expulsion of all Italian financiers and the free exercise of religion. The crown was uninterested in these terms, and began assembling its forces in the city to break out. Coligny and La Noue were sent by Condé to intercept recruits from Savoy coming north under the command of Strozzi. This would however be a failure and Strozzi would arrive near Paris in October. Meanwhile Condé, not appreciating the increasing danger he was in, sent Coligny's brother Andelot with troops to seize the town of Poissy and Montgomery to take the town of Pontoise. Thus, with his besieging army further weakened, the besieged Montmorency chose the moment to strike out from Paris.

==== Saint Denis ====
By now Coligny had at least returned to the main body, and at the Battle of Saint Denis took responsibility for the right flank of Condé's army while his lieutenant, Genlis, handled the left. Condé's heavy cavalry was torn into by the experienced Swiss troops, but his cavalry had more success against Montmorency's inexperienced Parisian levies, exposing Montmorency's position. Condé was unhorsed and had to be taken from the field. Montmorency meanwhile was shot by Robert Stuart. The Swiss would win the day for the crown, and although casualties were fairly low for either side, Condé, whose forces had been smaller to begin with, withdrew eastwards towards the border.

==== Chartres ====
The crown followed, hoping the rebel army would disintegrate without the need for another engagement. Condé and Coligny were however able to keep it together, uniting with the mercenaries, and upon their re-entry to France, more troops from the south. Emboldened once more, Condė decided to besiege Chartres, hoping it would be a rich and symbolic prize for his troops. Condé would however, set up the rebel guns poorly, and the siege would drag on. Before it could conclude however, both sides came to truce on 13 March and then formal peace with the Peace of Longjumeau.

=== Short peace ===
==== Longjumeau ====
Coligny, Andelot and Charles de Téligny were the prime negotiators of Longjumeau for the rebels. They were not however able to achieve much more than Condé had at Amboise years previously despite Coligny's denunciations of that peace. The terms largely repeated those of the prior edict, but it was nominally intended as a permanent peace in contrast to the provisional nature of Amboise's terms. Much of the militant Catholic population reacted with disgust to the peace, with riots in Rouen, Toulouse and Orléans. In the south both sides would flout the peace openly, with the Huguenot populations of Castres and Montpellier refusing entry to their returning royal garrison. Several armies of the crown, including that of Guillaume de Joyeuse and Sommerive maintained presence in the field, capturing towns and besting Huguenot commanders in battle.

==== Frustration ====
Coligny was frustrated at what he felt was the crowns failure to abide by the peace. He wrote to Catherine in June to complain about various outrages and violations. Characterising it as an attack on the monarchy through disregard for its edicts he also mentioned assassination plots against his person. Catherine dismissed these concerns, writing back that he had no reason to be frightened, and encouraging him to live in obedience to the king as he had the king's father and grandfather. When in July six masked men gunned down the lieutenant of Andelot's ordinance company, Coligny wrote bitterly to the king. In his letter he complained about his suspicions that not only was the attack orchestrated by the Confraternity of the Holy Ghost, but that therefore the provincial governors and the king had given tacit consent due to their cooperation with the various leagues.

==== Saint-Maur ====
Meanwhile the mood on the court was fast changing. With Hôpital out of favour, the moderates who had negotiated the peace began to be dominated by Catherine's new Italian favourites. This was compounded with the return of Lorraine. When, in search of financial relief for the kingdom, Pius V was approached, he proposed he would rescue the kingdom's finances in return for a war against heresy from the government. With a decision made to overturn the peace, in early September the leading Huguenot aristocrats, including Coligny, were warned of a plot to arrest them by Tavannes who felt the process dishonourable. As a result, Coligny, Condé and the other aristocrats fled south in haste, arriving in the Protestant stronghold of La Rochelle on 18 September, and taking up arms. The crown meanwhile established the Edict of Saint-Maur outlawing Protestantism in the kingdom. On 8 October Anjou took the field.

=== Third War ===
==== Jarnac ====
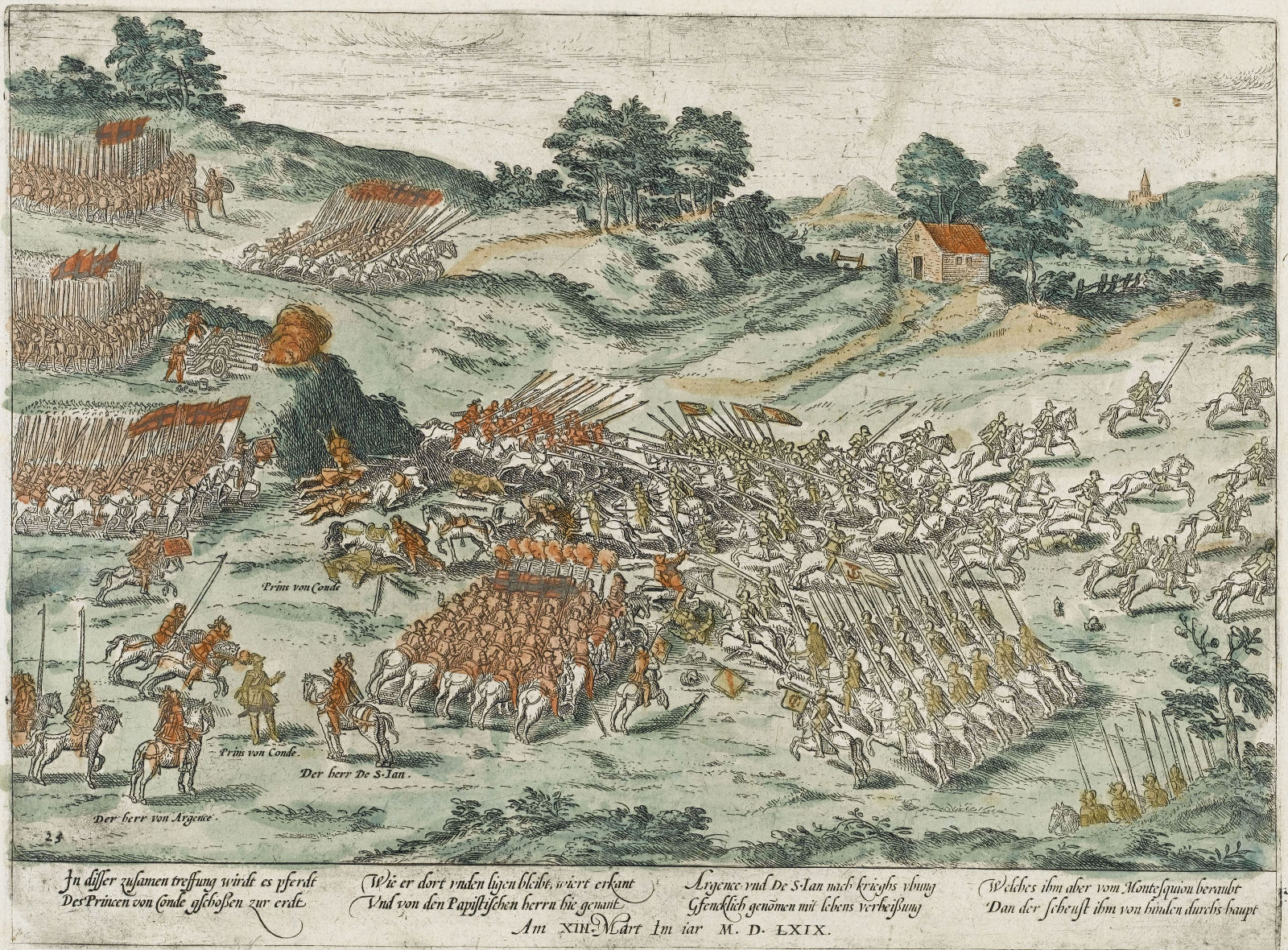
Condé is killed at the Battle of Jarnac leaving Coligny de facto head of the rebels

Conscious both of their more precarious position, and the failure of their prior campaigns to achieve decisive success Condé and Coligny took a new approach to the conflict they faced. Instead of hinging around the Loire, they would operate out of the Huguenot heartlands in the south, fortifying towns such as Angoulême and Cognac. As they moved south in early 1569, the army under the nominal command of Anjou caught their rear-guard, led by Condė while crossing a river. He would be captured, and while under armed guard without weapons, executed. Despite this heavy strategic blow to the rebel cause, the loss of the prince of the blood, Coligny was able to hold the rest of the army together, and withdraw in good order with only minimal casualties. While the young Navarre and Condé would inherit nominal command of the cause, their young age meant Coligny would be the de facto military leader. In May 1569 Coligny's brother Andelot would die of an illness on campaign.

==== La Roche l'Abeille ====
To revitalise his army, Coligny sought, and was able to achieve juncture between his forces and those of his German ally the duke of Zweibrücken and he turned to attack the smaller army under Strozzi, defeating him at the Battle of La Roche-l'Abeille. With confidence restored through this battle, Coligny settled in to besiege Poitiers where the young Henri I, Duke of Guise had rushed on news of his approach to reinforce the weak garrison. After many heavy bombardments a breach was created. The siege appeared close to victory for Coligny, however the garrison was able to repulse the assaults through it, and Coligny lifted the siege on 7 September. On 12 September the Parlement of Paris declared Coligny a traitor, forfeited his titles and property and further put a price of 50,000 écus on his head.

==== Paris ====
Soon after the failures of the siege the rebels were dealt a far more devastating blow than Jarnac at the Battle of Moncontour. During the course of the battle Coligny received a pistol shot to the face and while he survived he had to withdraw from the field. The loss of their leader left the army confused and directionless, dooming it. While the Huguenot army was savaged in the battle, it was not entirely annihilated and most of the cavalry was able to withdraw. Battle won, Anjou led the royal army to besiege Saint-Jean d'Angely. The siege would prove a disaster for the royal army, consuming it in famine and disease. Coligny meanwhile regrouped what forces he had left, united with the Viscounts of Languedoc and began a circuitous march towards Paris. Coligny marched from Nîmes into Burgundy, sacking the great Abbey of Cluny in June. Having bested a force under Cossé at Arney-le-Duc, he avoided the royal army at Autun, picked up further reinforcements at Sancerre and moved directly on Paris. This march would achieve its intended effect, and peace would be declared on favourable terms.

==== Peace ====
Negotiations had been seriously ongoing between Coligny, Jeanne d'Albret and the crown since December 1569. There had been difficulty over matters of public worship, and which towns the rebels would receive as security. Eventually it was agreed that Protestantism would be tolerated on the model of the Edict of January, and that the Huguenots would receive Montauban, La Charité sur Loire, La Rochelle and Cognac as surety for two years. While Coligny had considerable influence on these terms it was not as total as Condé's had been for Amboise. Instead he, Albret and a council of nobles voted on agreement for the various terms. The bounty on Coligny's head was to be revoked, and he was to be restored to his office as Admiral, with all his property returned.

=== Saint Bartholomew ===
==== Prelude ====
In 1571 Coligny married Jacqueline de Montbel d'Entremont. For much of late 1570 and 1571, he remained wary of returning to court, little trusting the offers of safety provided to him by the king. Instead he kept himself south in La Rochelle, Both the king of Spain and the Duke of Savoy were convinced he was plotting against them from the city, his marriage to de Montbel d'Entremont only further convincing Savoy, due to her being an heiress in the kingdom. He found himself compelled to return in September 1571 however, in hopes of convincing the court of his plan to invade the Spanish Netherlands, with a cross-faith army led by Charles personally, uniting the French against the real enemy, the Habsburgs. This plan appealed greatly to Charles, and he grew rapidly in favour with the young, impressionable king. He would not however stay at court long, and, failing to convince the council of his plans, he would withdraw after 5 weeks again to his estates. Henry, Duke of Guise, spent his time lobbying the court to re-open the investigation into the assassination of his father, but, as with Coligny, the council voted him down.

From December 1571 to May 1572 Coligny was again absent from court. Although he was suspicious of the prospect of the Navarre-Valois marriage, one of the key components of the 1570 peace, Catherine pushed him into acceptance on the issue, both by presenting him the possibility of a war with Spain, and by implying it was necessary for him to be on good terms with the king. In the furore that accompanied attempts to remove the Gastines Cross from Paris in 1571 in line with the 1570 peace, Coligny seemed fairly unbothered by whether the memorial was removed or not. Increasingly he was consumed in the construction of an anti-Spanish alliance, hoping to bring in a large coalition from the German princes to the Ottoman Empire to bring down Spain. French rapprochement with England in April 1572, in the Treaty of Blois (1572) seemed a major step towards the anti-Spanish alliance Coligny dreamed of. Yet once again he would run against the near unanimous opposition of the royal council to his plans.

The fiasco of the Genlis expedition, which in July had crossed the border with 4000 infantry only to be crushed and slaughtered by Spanish troops, only worsened the outlook for Coligny's plans. The involvement of Coligny and even the king's secret consent to the expedition of Genlis as a method of testing the water with Spain is a matter of debate.

==== Assassination attempt ====
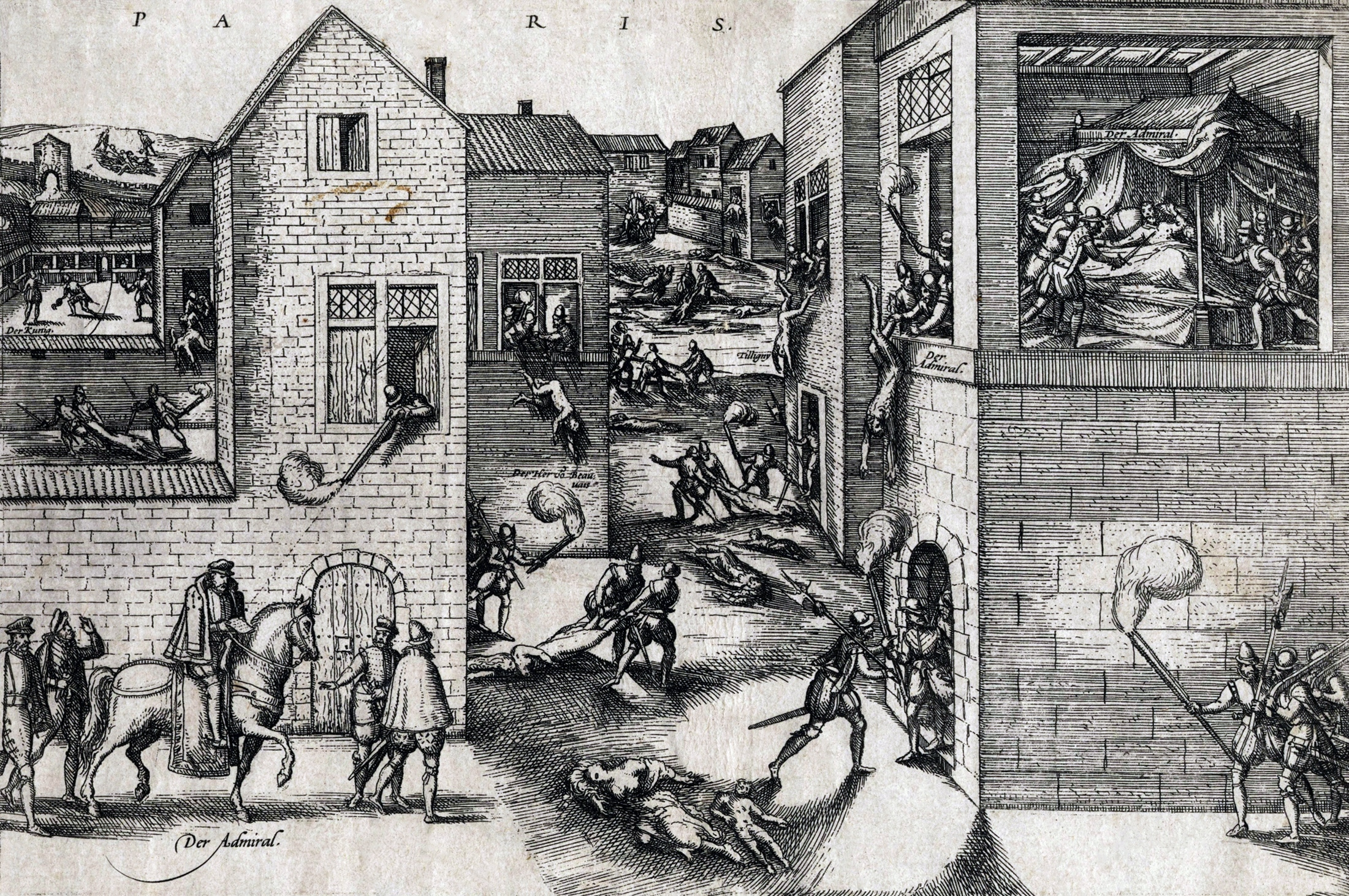
This popular print by Frans Hogenberg shows the attempted assassination of Coligny on 22 August on the left, and his murder on 24 August on the right

Coligny returned to Paris after a stay at his estates for the Navarre-Valois marriage. His attendance at this event was critical, as it represented a key component of the reconciliation between Catholic and Huguenot factions. After the wedding was concluded, Coligny stayed in the capital for several days, hoping to resolve several matters with the king of violations of the Peace of Saint-Germain-en-Laye. Leaving a mass for Marguerite on 22 August Coligny noticed the Huguenot banners lost at Moncontour hanging from the Notre-Dame, and commented that he felt those should be taken down and placed somewhere more appropriate to their honour. The same day after the end of the wedding festivities, Coligny was shot in the street on his way back to his residence, likely by a man called Maurevert from the top floor of a house. However, due to him bending down to tie his shoe the bullets only tore a finger from his right hand and shattered his left elbow. The would-be assassin escaped.

No contemporary investigation would be conducted into responsibility due to the events of the subsequent days. Historians have taken many positions on the matter. Some have argued Catherine de' Medici, jealous of Coligny's influence over the young king and fearful of his plans for war with Spain orchestrated the assassination. Others have attacked this notion, arguing she was seeking internal peace in this period and this worked against her interests, proposing instead the Guise, trying to satisfy their long running vendetta arranged the attack. Supporters of this argument highlight the house Maurevert was in was owned by Guise. Still others have argued in favour of the Parlement of Paris, the Duke of Anjou, de Retz, Philip II of Spain, the Duke of Alba and Maurevert working independently to satisfy a personal grudge.

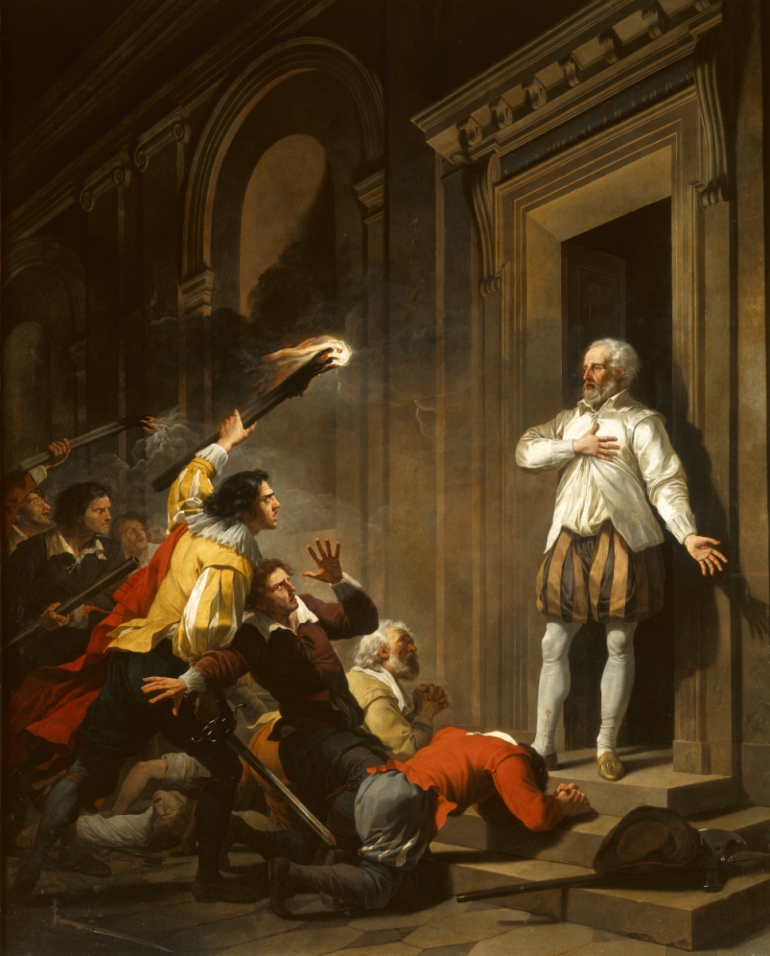
Admiral Coligny Confronts His Assassins by Joseph-Benoît Suvée, 1787

The King sent his own physician to treat Coligny and even visited him. Coligny meanwhile, furiously petitioned the king to investigate who had shot him. The king promised to look into the matter and bring all perpetrators to justice. Senior Protestant nobles such as Téligny and Rochefoucauld began making dark threats to the court about taking revenge on those they suspected of being the perpetrators. Coligny meanwhile, though not joining in this talk, elected to stay in the city against the advice of many of his allies.

==== Massacre ====
The Catholics now feared Huguenot retaliation for the attempt on Coligny's life, a fear only compounded by the 4000 troops Téligny had stationed outside the city. It was decided over the course of three council meetings on 23 August to pre-emptively assassinate their leadership, in what became known as the St. Bartholomew's Day massacre. The original proposer of the plan is unknown, but consent on the council from Catherine, the king, Retz, Nevers, Guise, Anjou was unanimous on the course of action. In the final meeting, at midnight, Guise, Aumale, Angoulême, Anjou and Montpensier drew up the kill lists and divided responsibility among themselves. Guise would strike at Coligny, before crossing to the left bank and taking out targets in the faubourg Saint-Germain. Montpensier would handle targets in the Louvre, including Navarre and Condé, who would be compelled to convert.

In the early hours of the 24th, Guise's men mustered at the Hôtel d'Aumale. In total he had 60 men, including his uncle Aumale, and Anjou. Just before dawn they struck at Coligny's residence, Anjou's guards having withdrawn from the house to afford them access. Coligny ordered his household to escape across the roof. First to burst into his chambers was Johann von Janowitz who remarked "Oh Admiral, Admiral, You sleep too deeply... Are you not the Admiral?" Coligny retorted "Yes I am him, But you are too young a soldier to speak thus to an old captain. At least have respect for my age." Before being pushed from the window the final words Coligny heard were "I am old enough to put you to rest."

Having fallen into the courtyard, what happened next is a matter of debate. Some Protestant contemporaries claim after pushing his boot into his foe's head, Guise arranged for the head to be severed and taken to Catherine, who embalmed it and sent it to the Pope. However, a Protestant eyewitness to what unfolded asserted that Guise did not dismount his horse. Having satisfied himself that Coligny was dead, he and his company left the corpse and went on to their next target. As the massacre proper began, the militant mob then cut off the genitals, head and hands and dragged the body around for the following days as they had done to a model of Coligny years prior. Over the next few hours a general massacre would develop, fomented by the city militia and radicals among the population. It would consume first Paris, and then spread to various other cities around France.

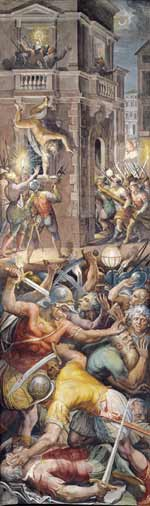
Coligny's murder (falling body, upper left), as depicted in a mural by Giorgio Vasari.

Coligny's papers were seized and burned by the queen mother; among them, according to Brantôme, was a history of the civil war, "very fair and well-written, and worthy of publication".

== Marriages and issue ==
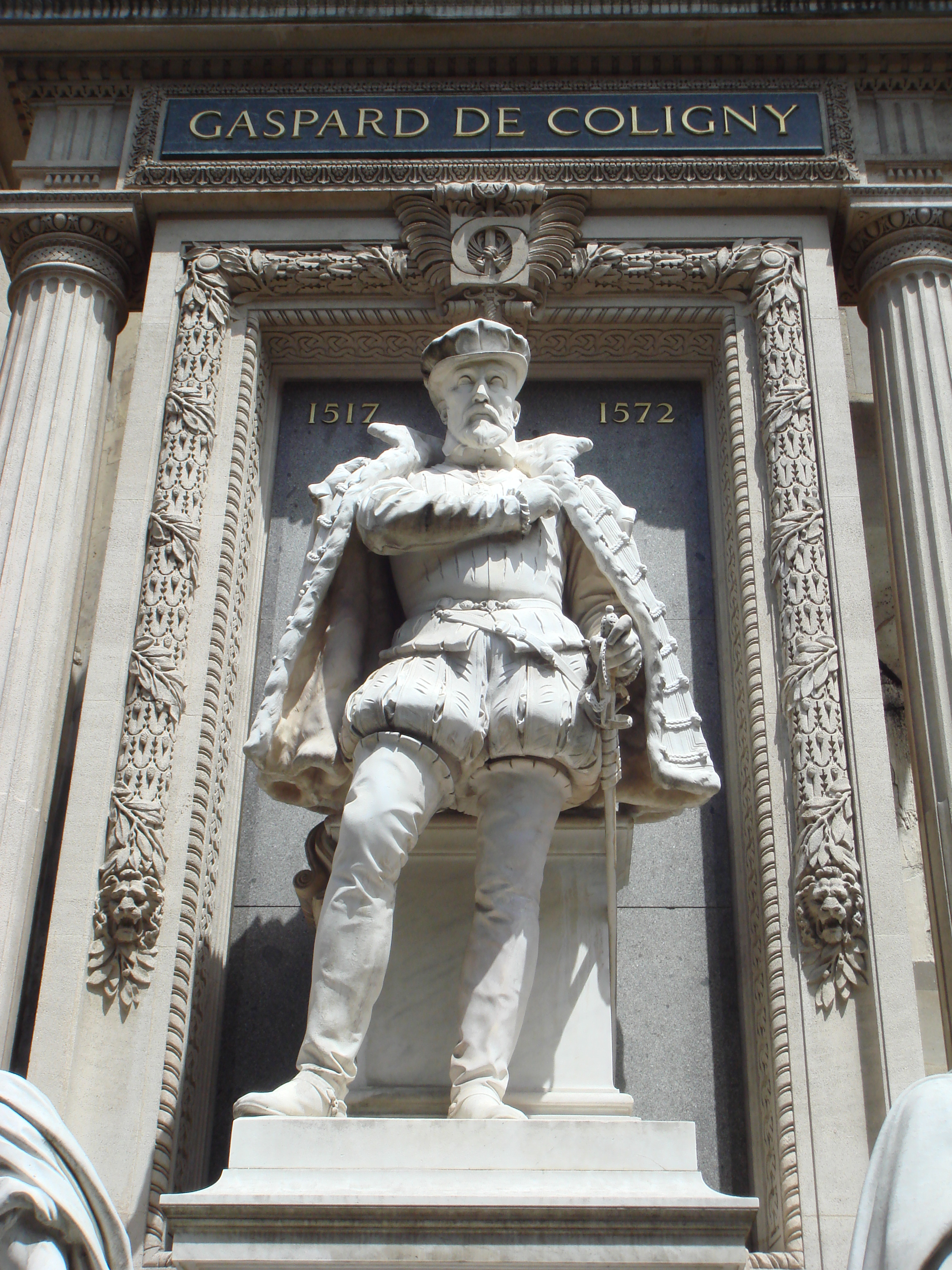
Monument to Gaspard de Coligny, by Gustave Crauck (1827–1905), at the Temple Protestant de l'Oratoire du Louvre, Paris.

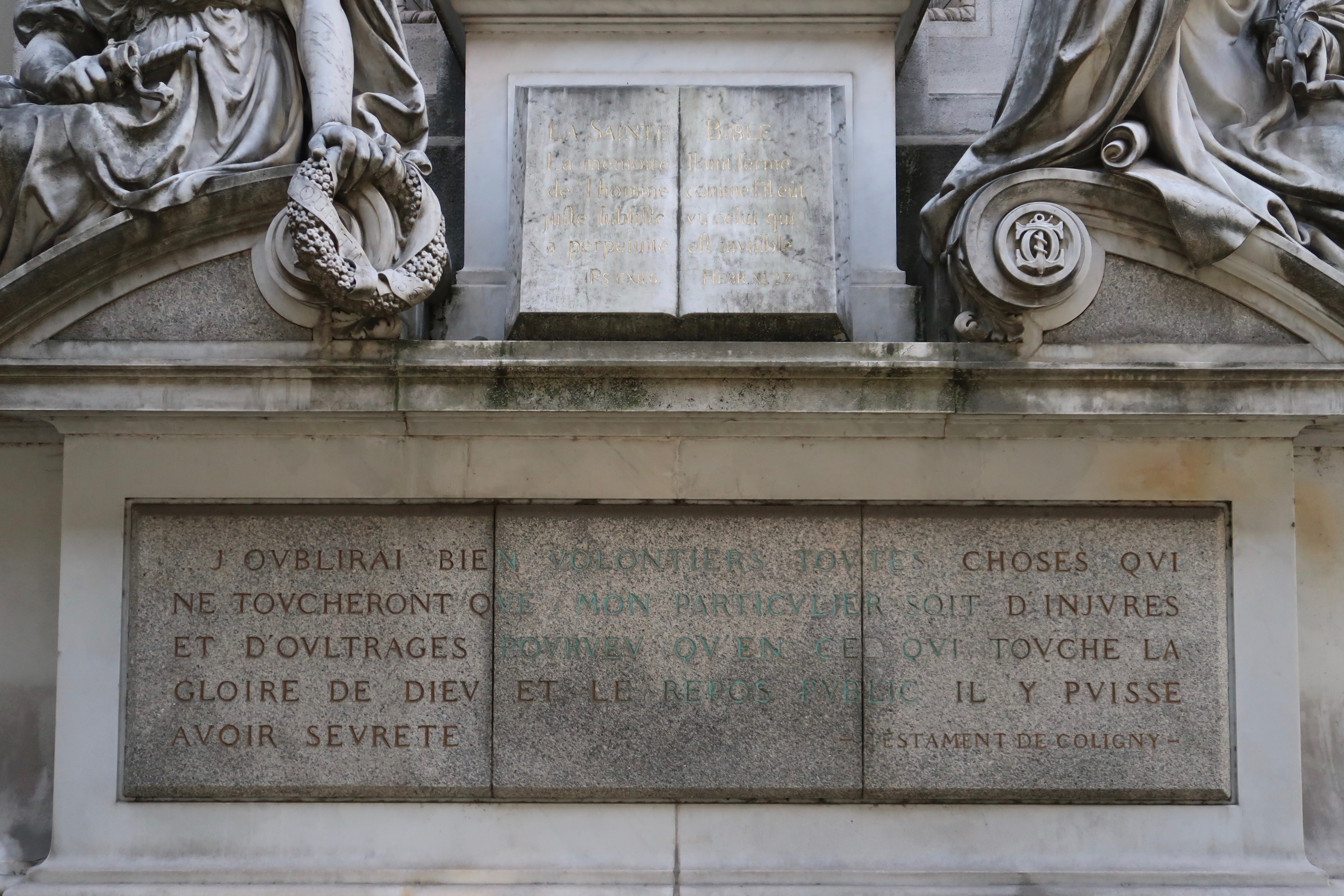
Plaque on the pedestal of the statue of Gaspard de Coligny (Paris) at the Temple Protestant de l'Oratoire du Louvre, Paris. The inscription, a quotation from Coligny's Testament, reads, in English translation: ‘I would gladly forget all that concerns me personally—injuries, insults, outrages, confiscation of my estates—provided the glory of God and public tranquility are assured."

By his first wife, Charlotte de Laval (1530–1568), Gaspard had:

- Louise, who married first Charles de Téligny and afterwards William the Silent, Prince of Orange;
- François, Admiral of Guienne, who was one of the devoted servants of Henry IV (Gaspard de Coligny (1584–1646), son of this François, was Marshal of France during the reign of Louis XIII); and
- Charles (1564–1632), Marquis d'Andelot, a Lieutenant General in Champagne.

By his second wife, Jacqueline de Montbel d'Entremont (1541–1588), the Countess d'Entremont and Launay-Gelin, Gaspard had one daughter:

- Béatrix, who became Beatrice de Coligny (born 1572), Countess d'Entremont by marriage to Claude-Antoine d'Albon de Montauban de Meuillon d'Entremont.

== Legacy ==
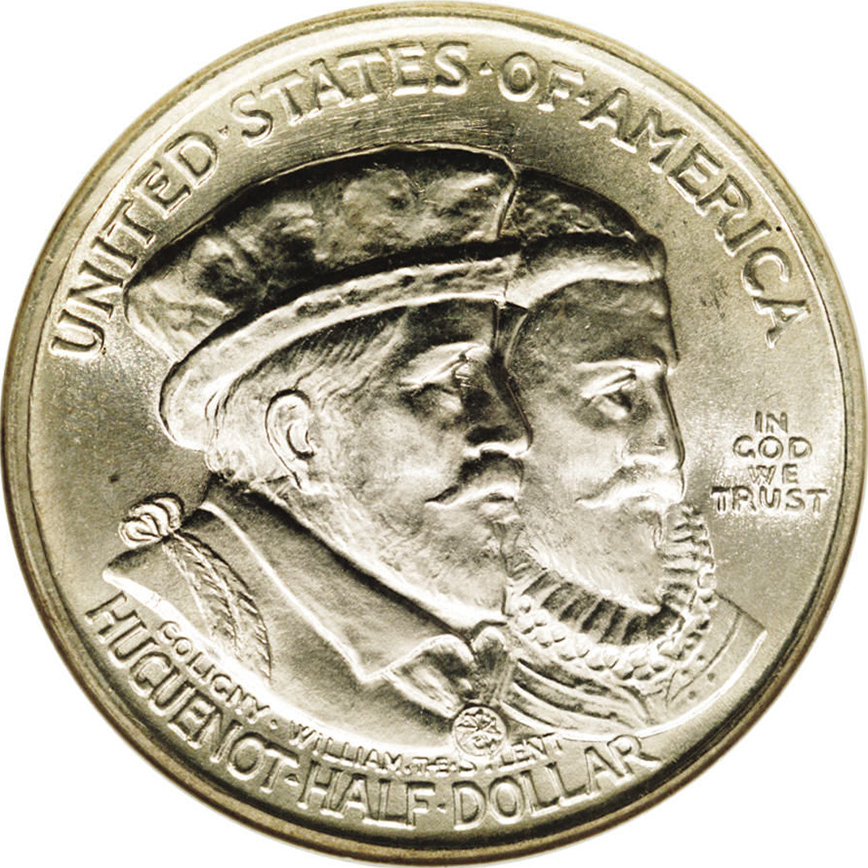
Coligny (left) on the obverse of the 1924 U.S. Huguenot-Walloon half dollar with William the Silent (designed by George T. Morgan)

Several places are named after de Coligny:

- Coligny, South Africa
- Fort Coligny, in Rio de Janeiro, Brazil
- Châtillon-Coligny, in France
- Coligny Plaza, Hilton Head Island
- Coligni (misspelled) Avenue, New Rochelle, New York

== Family tree ==
Coligny family tree

Guillaume de Montmorency	Anne Pot
Gaspard I	Louise de Montmorency	Anne de Montmorency, 1st Duke of Montmorency	Madeleine of Savoy
Charlotte de Laval	Gaspard II	Odet	François	François de Montmorency	Henri	Charles de Montmorency-Damville
Louise	François	Charles	Paul de Coligny
Frederick Henry, Prince of Orange	Gaspard III	Guy XX de Laval
William II of Orange	Gaspard IV de Coligny	Henriette	Anne	George II of Württemberg-Montbéliard
William III of England	Eleonore	Leopold

== Sources ==
- Jean du Bouchet, Preuves de l'histoire généalogique de l'illustre maison de Coligny (Paris, 1661)
- François Hotman, Vita Colinii (1575), translated as La vie de messire Gaspar de Colligny Admiral de France, (1643; facsimile edition prepared by Émile-V. Telle (Geneva: Droz) 1987).
- L. J. Delaborde, Gaspard de Coligny (1879–1882)
- Erich Marcks, Gaspard von Coligny, sein Leben und das Frankreich seiner Zeit (Stuttgart, 1892)
- H. Patry, "Coligny et la Papauté," in the Bulletin du protestantisme français (1902)
- Arthur Whiston Whitehead, Gaspard de Coligny, Admiral of France (1904)
- Charles Merki, L'Amiral de Coligny (1909).
- A Paris colloquy on Admiral de Coligny and his times in 1972 resulted in a volume of essays, Actes du colloque l'Amiral de Coligny et son temps (Paris) 1974.
- Baird, Henry (1880). The Rise of the Huguenots in Two Volumes, Vol 2 of 2. Hodder&Stoughton.
- Baumgartner, Frederic (1988). Henry II: King of France 1547-1559. Duke University Press.
- O'Brien de Clare, T J (2021). One Faith, One Law, One King: French Armies of the Wars of Religion 1562 - 1598. Helion.
- Butler, A.J. (1907). "The Wars of Religion in France". In Ward, A.W.; Prothero, G.W.; Leathes, Stanley (eds.). The Cambridge Modern History. Vol. III. Cambridge University Press.
- Carroll, Stuart (2009). Martyrs and Murderers: The Guise Family and the Making of Europe. Oxford University Press.
- Harding, Robert (1978). Anatomy of a Power Elite: the Provincial Governors in Early Modern France. Yale University Press.
- Holt, Mack P. (2005). The French Wars of Religion, 1562-1629. Cambridge University Press.
- Knecht, Robert (2010). The French Wars of Religion, 1559-1598. Routledge.
- Potter, David (1997). The French Wars on Religion: Selected Documents. Palgrave Macmillan.
- Salmon, J.H.M (1975). Society in Crisis: France during the Sixteenth Century. Metheun & Co.
- Shimizu, J. (1970). Conflict of Loyalties: Politics and Religion in the Career of Gaspard de Coligny, Admiral of France, 1519–1572. Geneva: Librairie Droz.
- Sutherland, Nicola (1981). "The Assassination of Francois Duc de Guise February 1563". The Historical Journal. 24 2.
- Sutherland, Nicola (1973). The Massacre of St Bartholomew and the European Conflict 1559-1572. Macmillan.
- Sutherland, Nicola (1980). The Huguenot Struggle for Recognition. Yale University Press.
- Thompson, James (1909). The Wars of Religion in France 1559-1576: The Huguenots, Catherine de Medici and Philip II. Chicago University Press.
- Walsby, Malcolm (2007). The Counts of Laval: Culture, Patronage and Religion in Fifteenth and Sixteenth-Century France. Ashgate Publishing Limited.
- Wood, James (2002). The Kings Army: Warfare, Soldiers and Society during the Wars of Religion in France, 1562-1576. Cambridge University Press.
