= Albeck, Carinthia =

Albeck
- Municipality
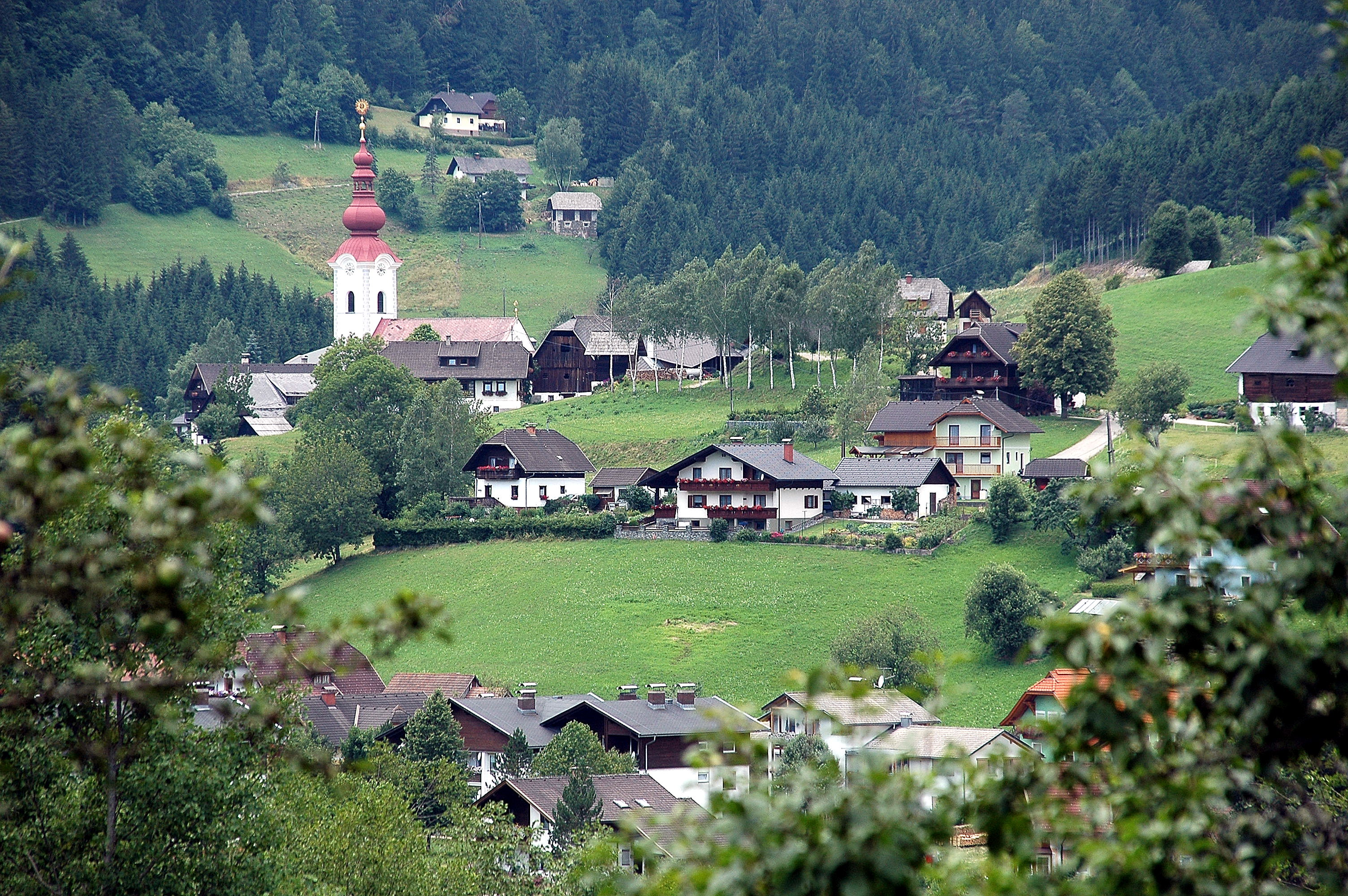
- Sirnitz

- Coat of arms

- Location within Austria
- Coordinates: 46°49′N 14°6′E
- Country: Austria
- State: Carinthia
- District: Feldkirchen

Government
  - Mayor: Wilfried Mödritscher (ÖVP)

Area
  - Total: 99.32 km^{2} (38.35 sq mi)
- Elevation: 837 m (2,746 ft)

Population (2018-01-01)
  - Total: 995
  - Density: 10.0/km^{2} (25.9/sq mi)
- Time zone: UTC+1 (CET)
  - Summer (DST): UTC+2 (CEST)
- Postal code: 9571
- Website: albeck.gv.at

Albeck is a municipality in the district of Feldkirchen in the Austrian state of Carinthia.

== Geography ==
The municipal area stretches along the valley of the Sirnitzbach creek, a tributary of the Gurk river, within the Gurktal Alps. In the northwest, Albeck borders on the state of Styria near Mt Eisenhut and Turracher Höhe Pass. In the west, the road leads from Sirnitz to Reichenau via Hochrindl Pass. The upper Gurk valley and its sources, two small cirque lakes (Gurksee and Torersee), are a protected area since 1981.

Albeck comprises the cadastral communities of Albeck proper, Großreichenau, Sankt Leonhard, and Sirnitz. The main settlement is the village of Sirnitz.

== History ==
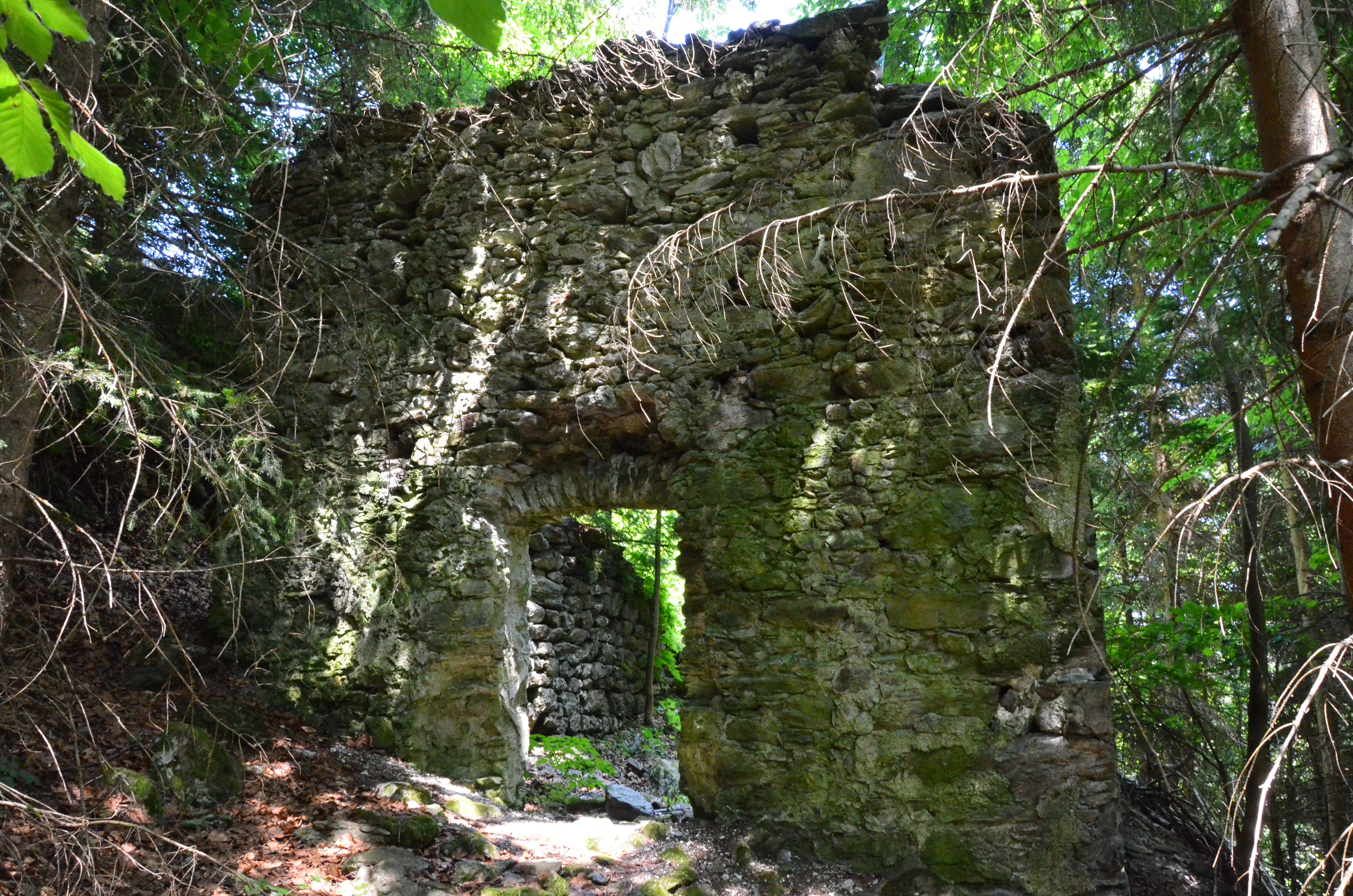
Ruins of Alt-Albeck Castle

Albeck is a settlement area since the 10th century, when the surrounding estates were held by the Counts of Friesach, ancestors of Saint Hemma of Gurk. In 1043 Hemma granted the Lordship of Albeck to the short-lived Benedictine nunnery of Gurk. When Archbishop Gebhard of Salzburg had the abbey dissolved in 1072, he ceded the estates to the newly established Diocese of Gurk.

Albeck Castle (present-day Alt-Abeck) was first mentioned in 1155. Located high above the narrow Gurk valley, it was the residence of the local landlords; one Dietrich of Albeck, a canon at Gurk Cathedral, was even appointed bishop by Archbishop Conrad III of Salzburg in 1179. When the line became extinct in 1194, protracted inheritance disputes arose with the Styrian counts of Peggau-Pfannberg. Nevertheless, from 1264 the area was again held by the Gurk bishops, represented by local ministeriales. In the late 17th century, Alt-Abeck was demolished and a new Baroque castle was erected on the road to Sirnitz.

== Politics ==
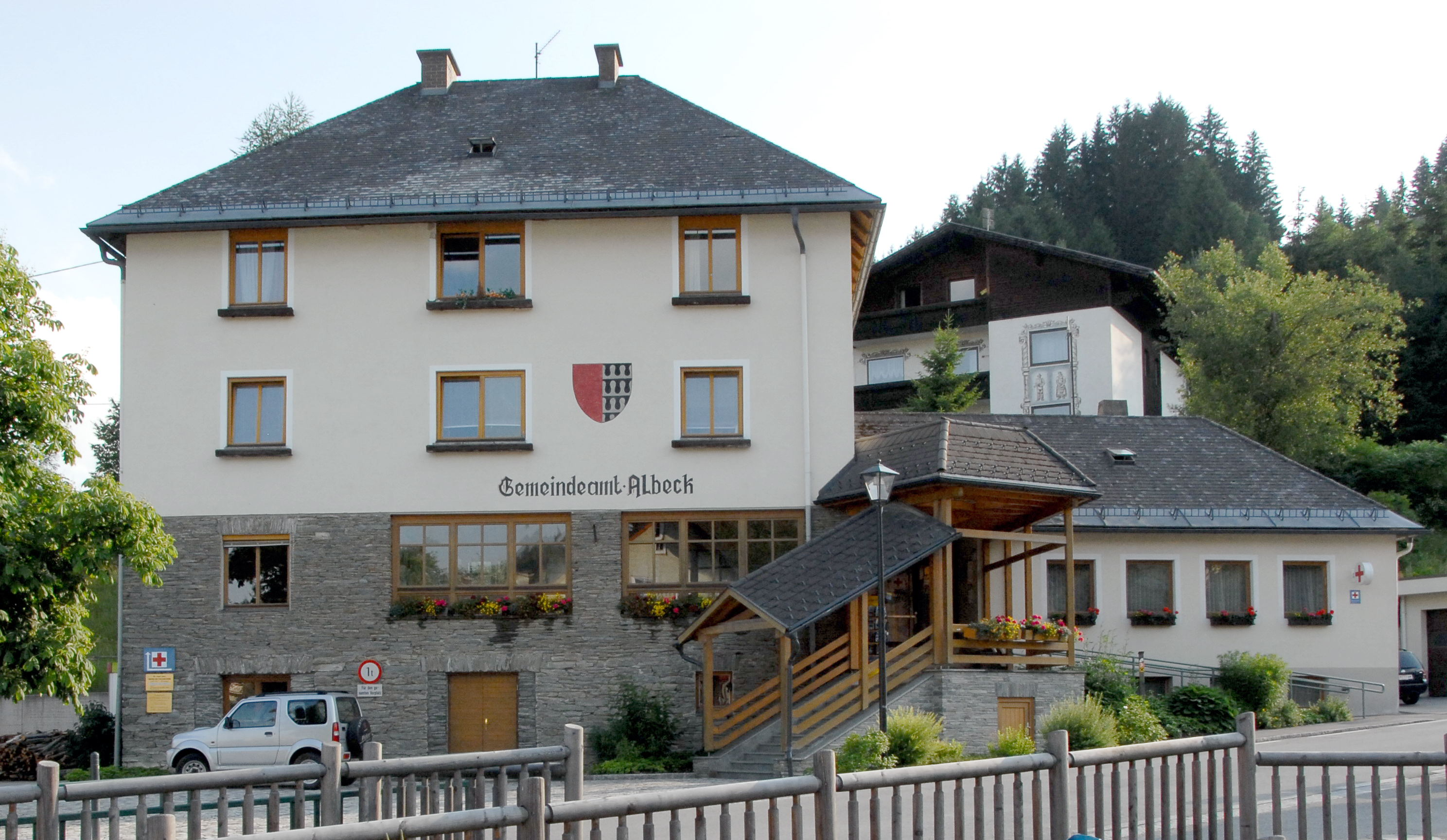
Town hall in Sirnitz

The municipal council (Gemeinderat) consists of 11 members. Following the 2021 Carinthian local elections, the seat distribution is as follows:

- Freedom Party of Austria (FPÖ): 5 seats
- Austrian People's Party (ÖVP): 4 seats
- Social Democratic Party of Austria (SPÖ): 2 seats

The mayor of Albeck, Wilfried Mödritscher (ÖVP), was elected in 2021.

=== Twin towns ===
Albeck is twinned with:

- Langenau, Germany
- Fiume Veneto, Italy
