= Thimo =

Thimo may refer to:

- Thiemo, Archbishop of Salzburg
- Thimo of Wettin, son of Marquis Dietrich II of Niederlausitz
