= Burgruine Steuerberg =

Castle ruin in Austria

Coordinates: 46.7977°N 14.0807°E

- Carinthia, Austria
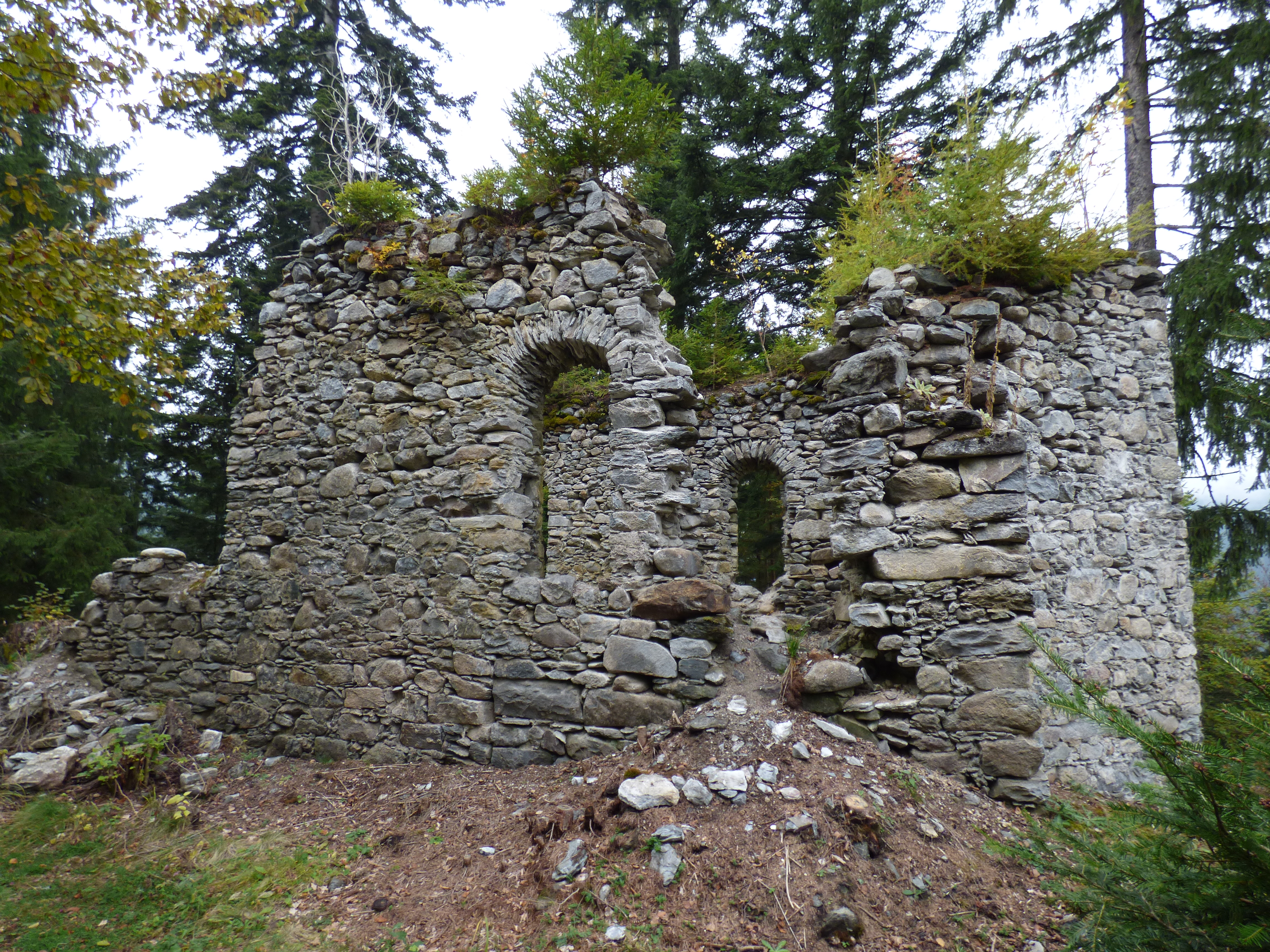

Site information
- Type: Hilltop castle

Site history
- Built: first mentioned 1279

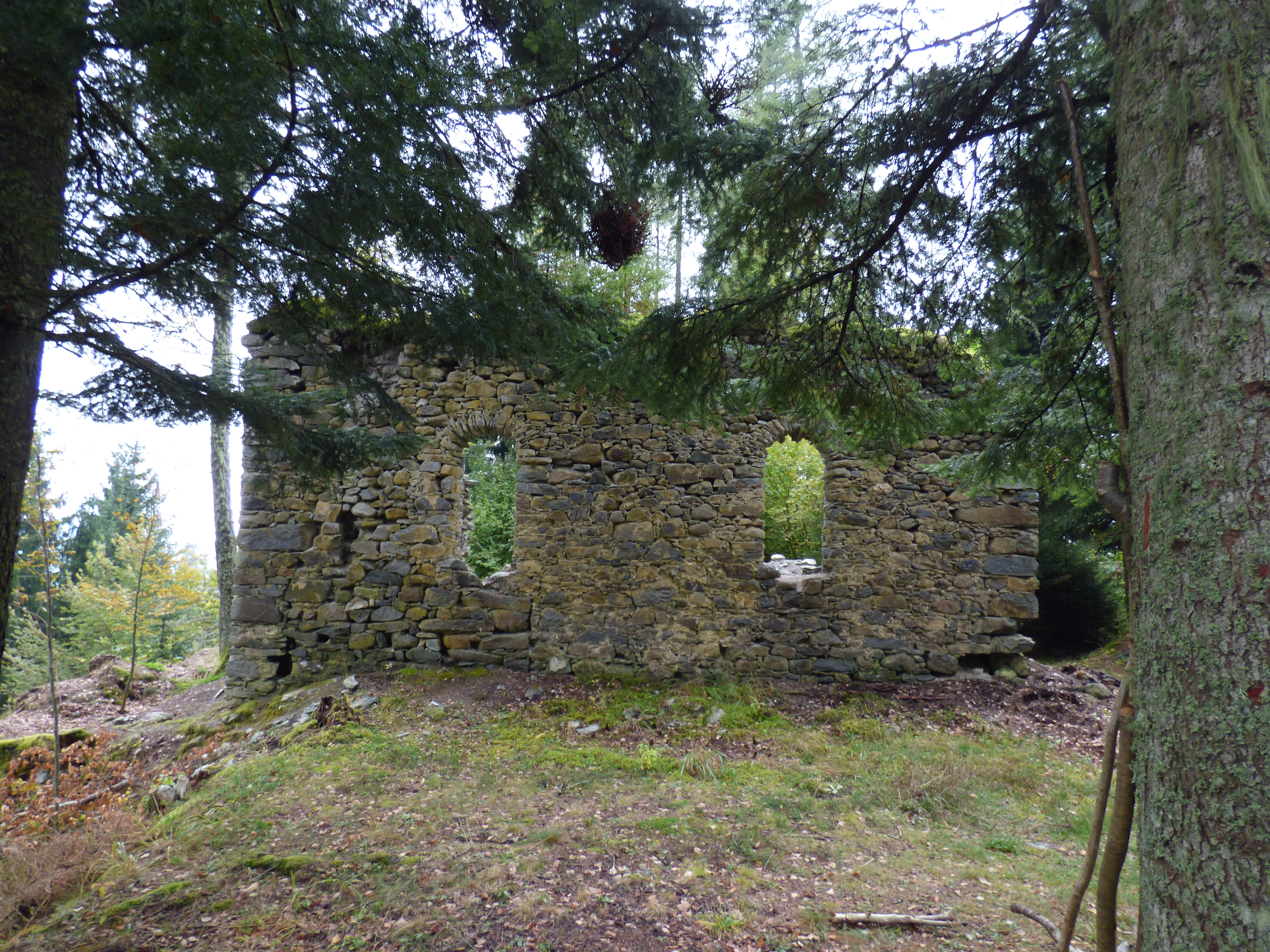
Steuerberg castle windows

Burgruine Steuerberg is the ruins of a castle near Feldkirchen in Carinthia, Austria; 779 metres (2,556 ft) above sea level.

== History ==
The Burgruine Steuerberg was possibly built by the Eppenstein dukes of Carinthia in the 11th century, AD. After the male members of the Eppenstein family died out in 1122, the castle was owned by the Lords of Touernich in the 12th century as vassals of the new Carinthian dukes from the Spanheim family. The castle was abandoned in 1827.

== Facilities ==
A building description of the castle from 1603 has been preserved; it was still intact then. In 1688, however, it was obviously no longer important and had already fallen into disrepair: in his Topography of the Archduchy of Carinthia, Johann Weichard von Valvasor only mentioned the old castle in passing as being not far from Albeck Castle on a high mountain and the Jesuits of Millstatt due.

The remaining remains of the wall and the description from 1603 give an idea of what the castle once looked like. The walled structure was 70 meters long in a north-south orientation and up to 20 meters wide. Although it was at a fairly high altitude, it was accessible by a path suitable for carriages. As a functional building, the castle had only a few living quarters. Stables and storerooms took up most of the space.

The actual palace – the residential wing – was in the southern part, the courtyard with stable and battlements in the north. The entrance to the castle was on the west in the middle of the ring wall and was closed with a heavy wooden door. A moat with a drawbridge separated the southern part with the main buildings from the rest of the castle. A brick cistern was located in the moat .

Under the main wing, along its entire width, there was a large cellar carved into the rock and two smaller vaulted cellars. The basement ceiling was made of wood and supported on columns. The grain crate, the vaulted kitchen and the servants ' room were located above the large cellar . Adjacent to this were two more rooms, which served as storage, among other things . Little light fell into these lower rooms from a small courtyard between two side walls. A wooden staircase led to the upper floor. There was the "Mueshaus", the dining room, which, like most of the other rooms on this floor, had two windows. On the front was the main room with four beautiful windows, from which the view of the Meierhof in Wabl below the castle and into the valley. A staircase led from the dining room to the roof. The front corners were finished with wooden bay windows .

The chapel was located in the spacious courtyard . The original building was probably erected a little further east in the 12th century, with the apse being integrated into the ring wall. Probably towards the end of the 13th century the chapel was moved a little further to the west; Parts of the old chapel wall served as the foundation for the new outer walls.

The stable for 20 horses was located in the northern part of the complex. Above was a grain box, and hay and straw were stored under the roof.

== See also ==
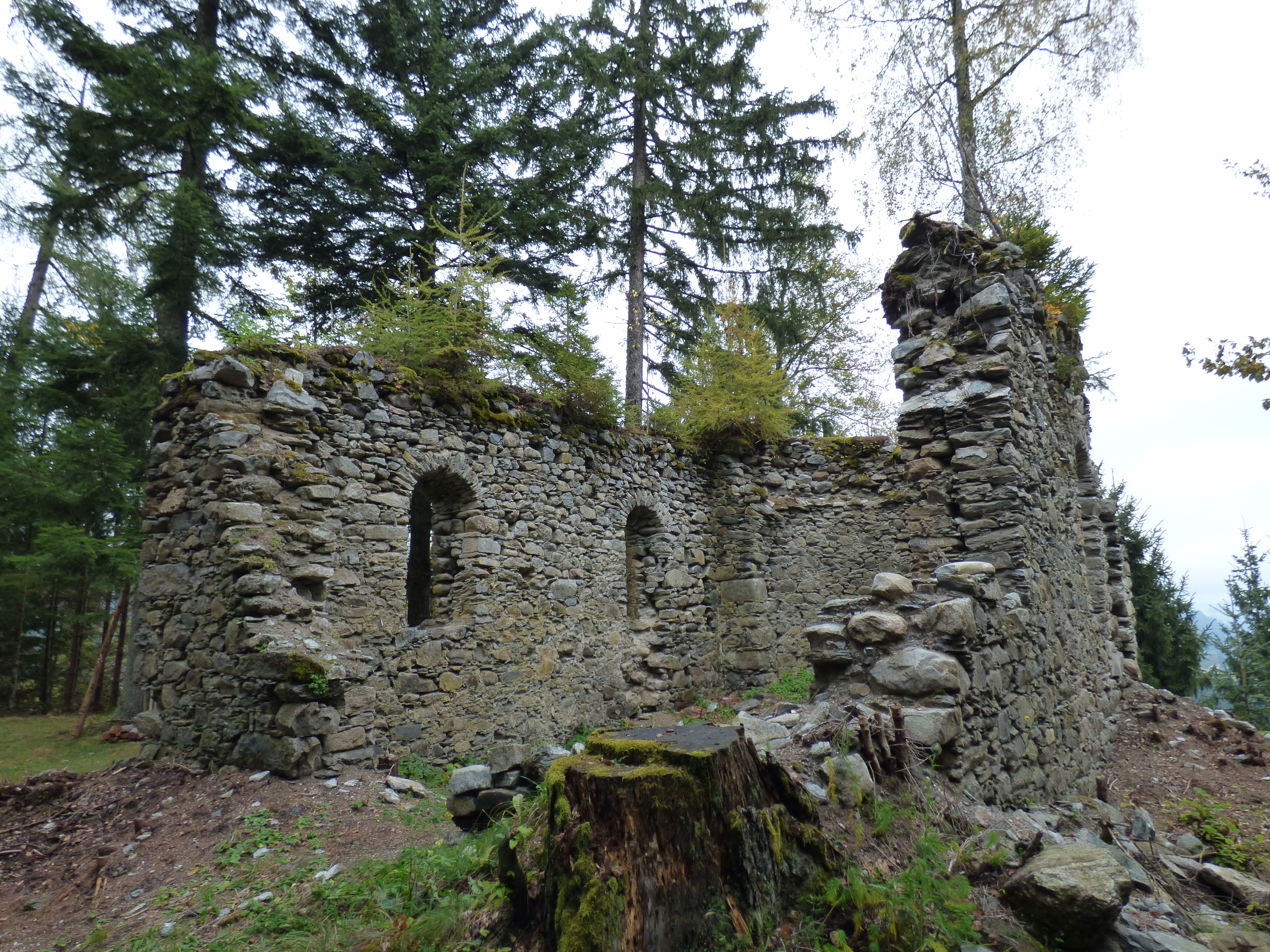
- Multiple stories of the castle
  List of castles in Austria
