= Kampl =

Kampl is a surname. Notable people with the surname include:

- Kevin Kampl (born 1990), Slovenian footballer
- Siegfried Kampl (born 1936), Austrian politician
