= Gurk Cathedral =

Coordinates: 46°52′30″N 14°17′37″E

- Pfarr- und ehemalige Domkirche Mariae Himmelfahrt (German); Dom zu Gurk (German); Bazilika v Krki (Slovene)
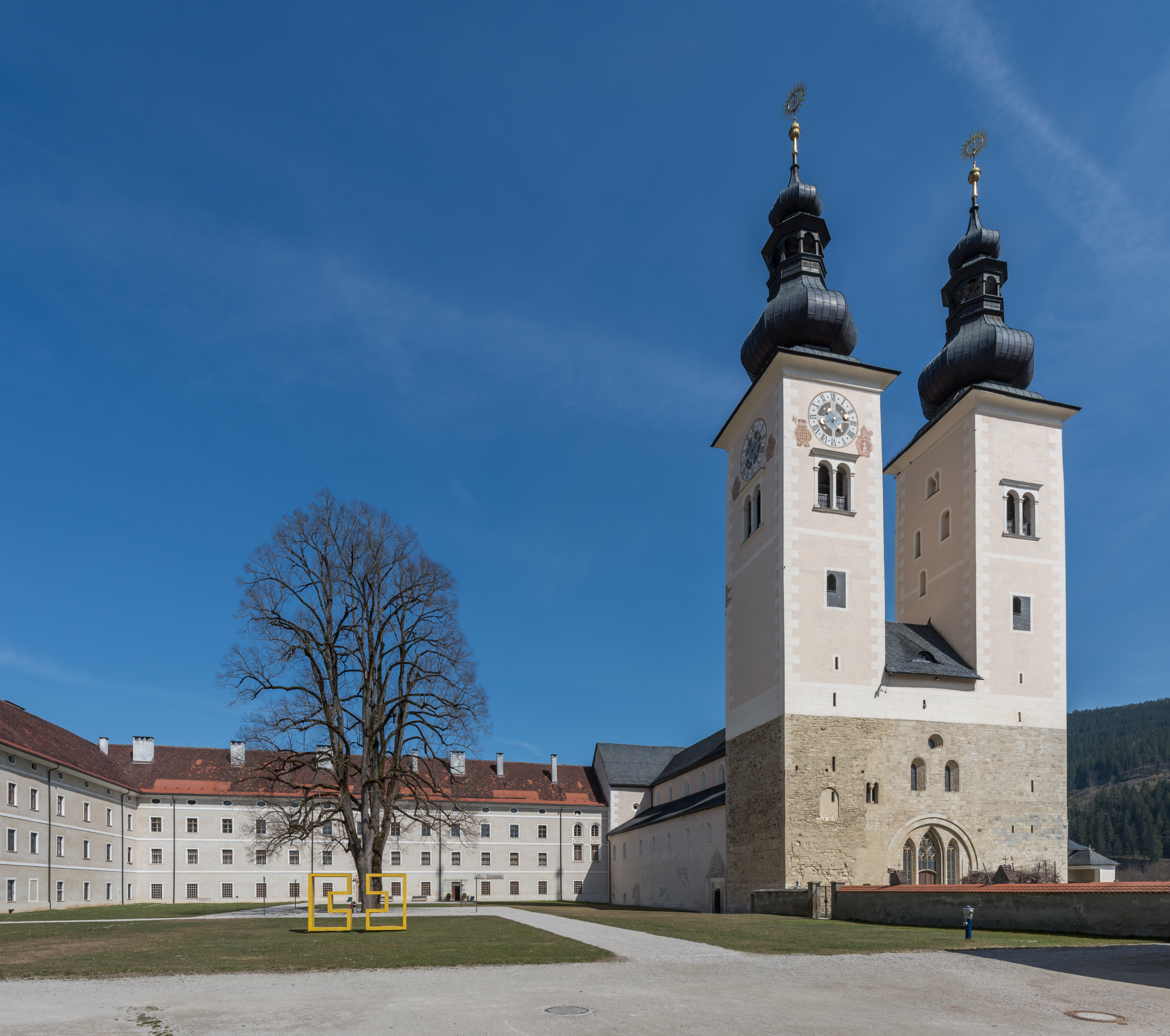
- Location: Gurk, Carinthia
- Country: Austria
- Denomination: Catholic

History
- Founded: c. 1140
- Founder: Bishop Roman I of Gurk
- Consecrated: 1200

Architecture
- Functional status: Cathedral
- Style: Romanesque

Administration
- Diocese: Diocese of Gurk

Clergy
- Bishop: Josef Marketz

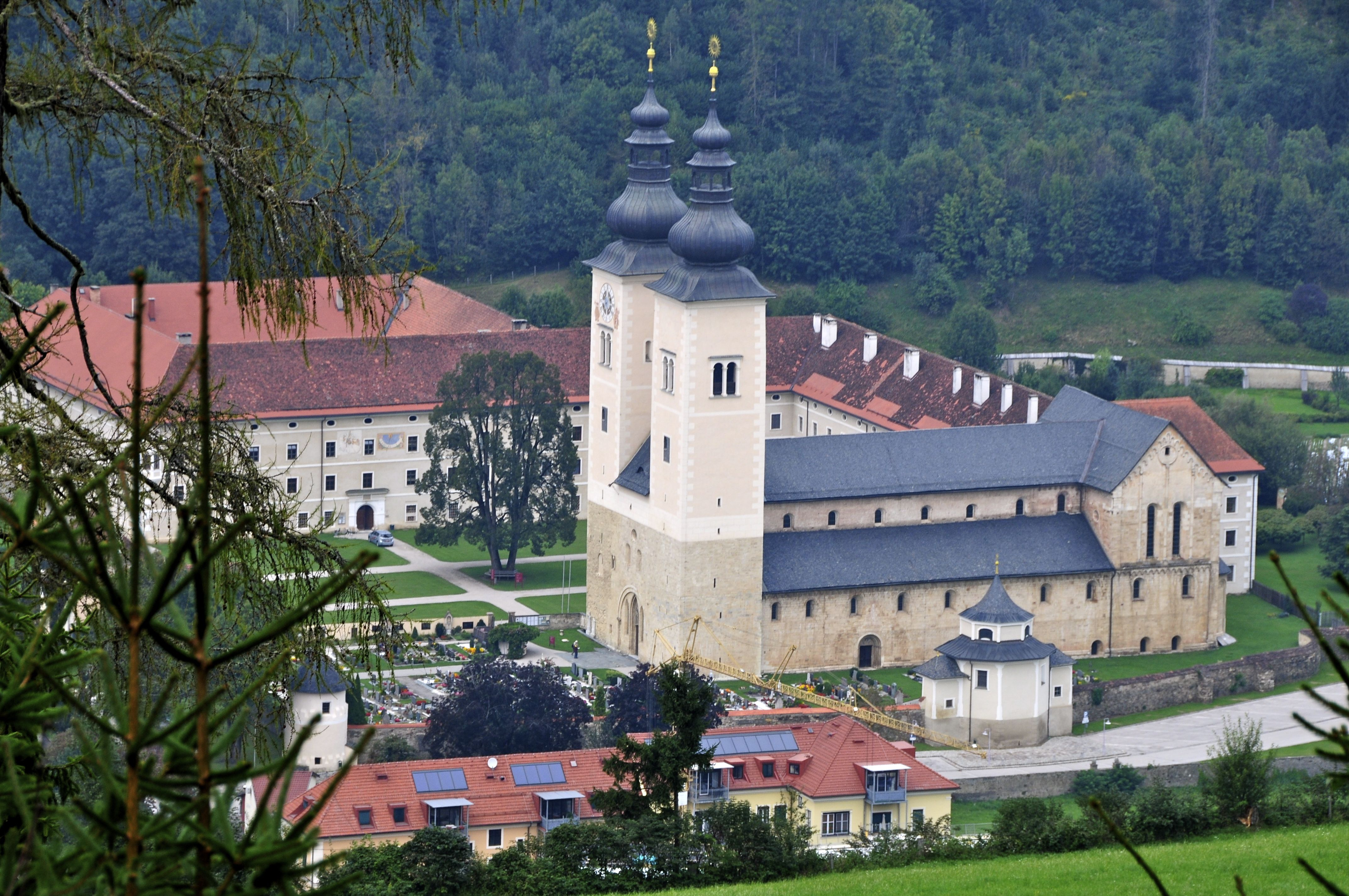
Gurk Cathedral

Gurk Cathedral (German: Dom zu Gurk, officially Pfarr- und ehemalige Domkirche Mariae Himmelfahrt, Slovene: Bazilika v Krki) is a Romanesque pillar basilica in Gurk, in the Austrian state of Carinthia. The former cathedral and current co-cathedral of the Catholic Diocese of Gurk was built from 1140 to 1200. It is one of the most important Romanesque buildings in Austria.

With its consecration in 1174, the grave of Saint Hemma of Gurk was relocated there from former Gurk Abbey, a Benedictine nunnery she had founded in 1043 and which was dissolved by Archbishop Gebhard of Salzburg in 1070/72, in order to fund the newly established Gurk diocese and the construction of the cathedral. The cathedral chapter established in 1123 moved to Klagenfurt in 1787.

== Construction ==
The elongated building has a westwork with two towers, a gallery, a crypt, and three apses. The crypt, with its 100 columns, is the oldest part of the cathedral. In the middle of the rural Gurktal, the imposing 60 m (200 ft) tall twin steeple of the cathedral can be seen from a very great distance.

== Gallery ==
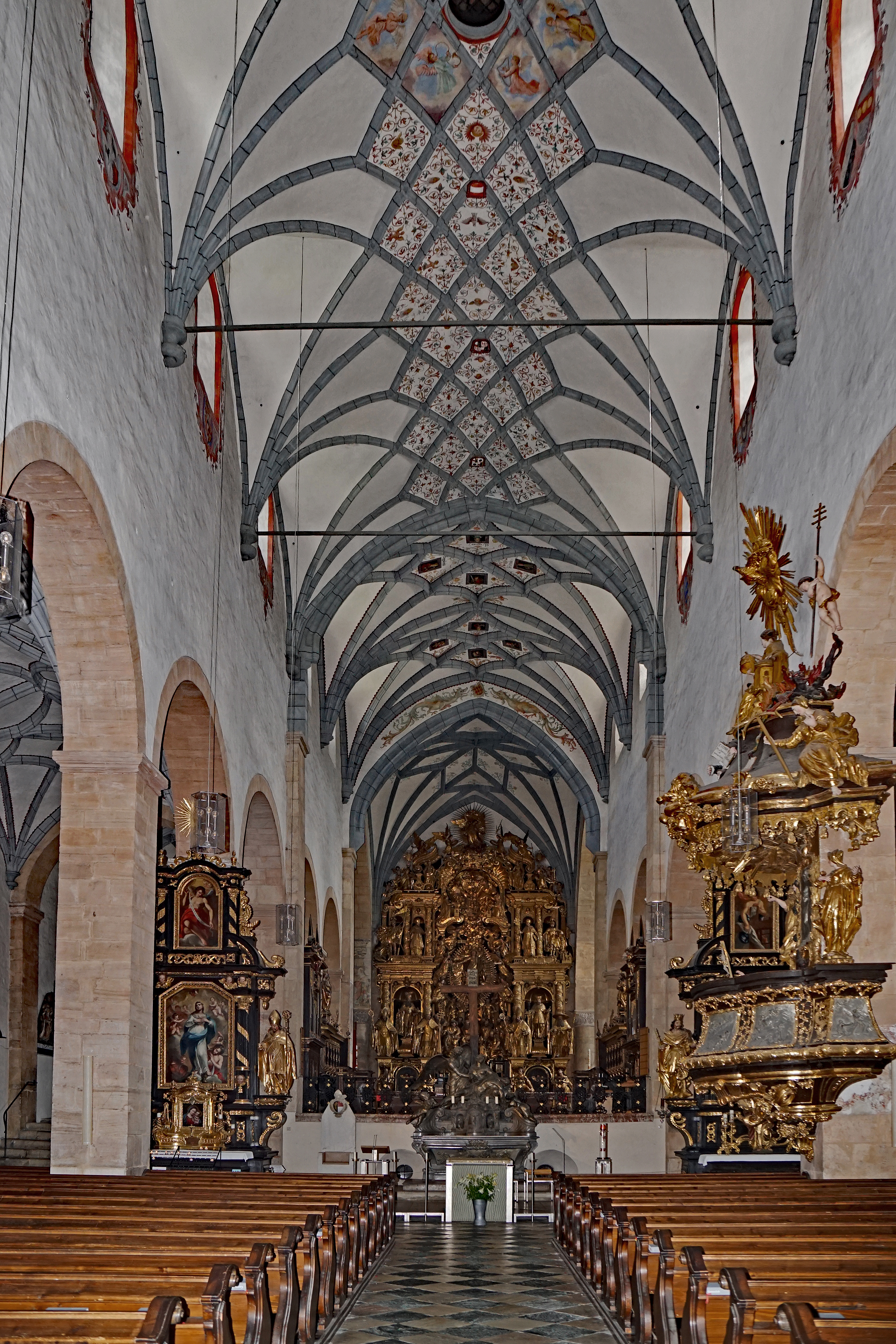
Interior

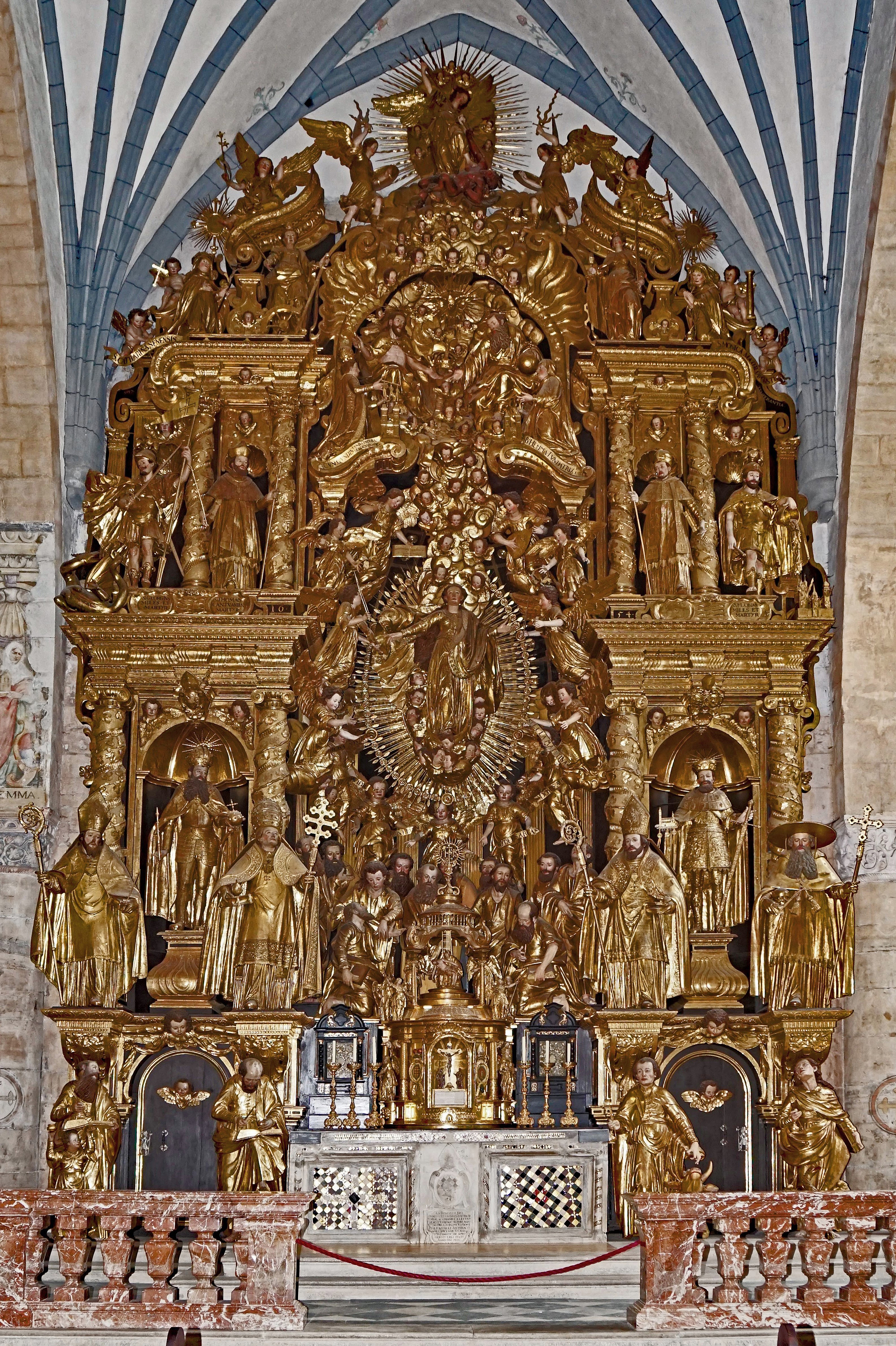
High Altar
