= Gurk Abbey =

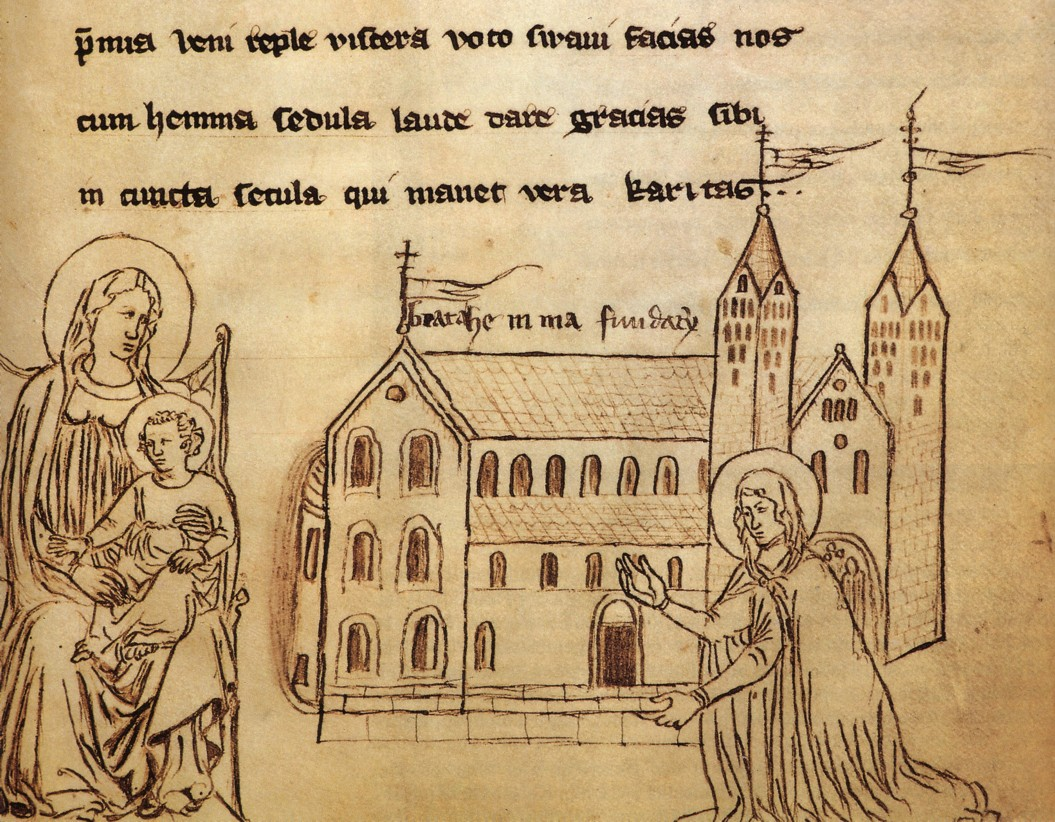
Hemma dedicating Gurk Cathedral to Mary, Legenda Beatae Hemmae, 14th century

Gurk Abbey (German: Stift Gurk) was a short-lived nunnery in Gurk, Carinthia (in present-day Austria), founded in 1043 by Saint Hemma of Gurk.

The monastery arose at the site of a former Celtic temple, dedicated to the Gallo-Roman goddess Epona. In 898 the Carolingian emperor Arnulf granted the Gurk valley to his son Zwentibold, one of Saint Hemma's ancestors. A widow since the killing of her husband William, margrave on the Sann in 1036, she founded a convent of noble ladies on the Gurk manor, apparently without implying a strict order rule. She had a church erected, dedicated to Saint Mary, which was consecrated on 15 August 1043. Her endowment comprised extended estates in the Duchy of Carinthia and its Styrian and Carniolan marches. She also ceded large properties in the Enns valley to the Salzburg archbishop, the basis for the foundation of Admont Abbey in 1074.

Saint Hemma possibly joined the Gurk convent herself. She died about two years later and was buried in the monastery church. The nunnery was dissolved in 1070 by Archbishop Gebhard of Salzburg, who used the assets so realised to establish the suffragan Diocese of Gurk centered at Gurk Cathedral. Hemma's mortal remains were transferred to the newly erected cathedral in 1174; the former abbey church decayed and was finally demolished in the 19th century.
