= Thiemo =

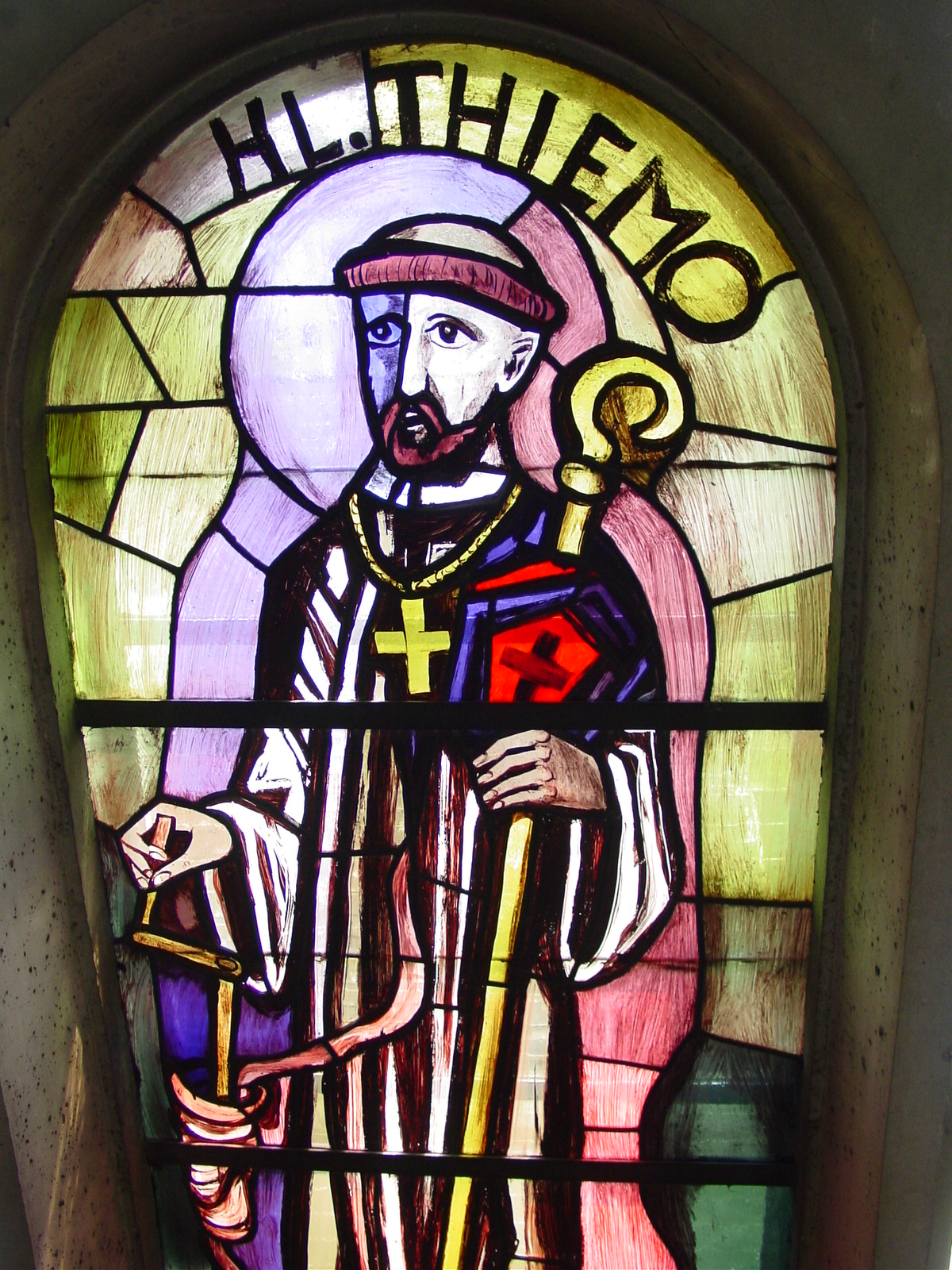
- Modern portrait of Thiemo in stained glass, Liesing parish church, Vienna

Archbishop of Salzburg and Martyr
- Born: about 1040
- Died: 1101/02; Ashkelon(?)
- Feast: 28 September
- Attributes: Spindle
- Patronage: Sculptors, engravers

Thiemo (Thimo, also called Dietmar or Theodemarus; c. 1040 – 28 September 1101/02) was Archbishop of Salzburg from 1090 until his death.

== Life ==
A scion of the Bavarian comital House of Vornbach (Formbach), Thiemo reportedly was a talented painter and sculptor. He entered the Benedictine abbey of Niederaltaich and in 1077 became abbot of the St. Peter's Monastery in Salzburg.

Under Archbishop Gebhard, he was caught up in the fierce Investiture Controversy as a papal supporter in opposition to German king Henry IV. While Henry had the archbishop expelled, Thiemo likewise, in 1081, went into exile, at first to Mönchsdeggingen and Hirsau Abbey in Swabia, later to Admont, Styria.

In 1086 Thiemo was able to return to Salzburg, together with Gebhard, whom he succeeded after his death two years later. Elected archbishop on 25 March 1090, he received the holy orders on April 7, confirmed by Pope Urban II.

In 1095 Thiemo attended the Council of Piacenza, while a domestic conflict with anti-bishop Count Berthold of Moosburg, who had been appointed by Henry IV in 1085, continued. He was defeated by Berthold's troops in 1097 and escaped to Carinthia, where he was arrested at Friesach by the forces of the Gurk bishop. Freed by a loyal monk, Thiemo found a refuge in the diocese of befriended Bishop Gebhard of Constance at Petershausen Abbey.

In 1101 Thiemo decided to join Duke William IX of Aquitaine on his crusade to Palestine and did not return. Several traditions concerning his death exist. He may have been taken captive by the Seljuqs of Rûm at Ereğli (Heraclea) in Anatolia in September 1101 or was imprisoned by the Fatimid Caliphate at Ashkelon in the following year. His martyrdom is described being tortured and killed by pulling the intestines out of his body with a spindle.

He was never canonized by the Catholic Church. His name day is 28 September.

Catholic Church titles
| Preceded by Gebhard | Archbishop of Salzburg; 1090-1101/02 | Succeeded by Konrad I |
