= Siegfried Kampl =

Austrian politician (born 1936)

Siegfried Kampl (born 13 August 1936) is an Austrian politician. Kampl has been mayor of the town of Gurk since 1991, and was a member of the Federal Council of Austria (the Bundesrat) from 2004 to 2009.

== Biography and political career ==
Kampl was born in Steuerberg, in the Austrian state of Carinthia. He completed the agricultural vocational school and an agricultural technical school. He married Elizabeth Bucher in 1960.

In 1974 he was selected to be the local party chairman of the Austrian Freedom Party (FPÖ) in Gurk; two years later he became its district party chairman. In 1979 he was elected to the Gurk local council, and was selected immediately to be vice mayor, a position he retained for twelve years. During this time period, he was also elected to the state parliament (Landtag) of Carinthia, in which he served for the FPÖ from 1982 through 1994. In 1991, he was elected mayor of Gurk with 53.4% of the vote, and also remained a member of the Landtag. In 2004, he was sent as a representative of Carinthia to the Federal Council of Austria (the Bundesrat), where he again sat with the FPÖ.

In the Federal Council, Kampl was closely allied with controversial FPÖ leader Jörg Haider, who he had helped propel to the party leadership in 1986. Kampl calls himself "very homeland-connected" and nationalist. When the FPÖ split in April 2005, Kampl followed Haider to his new party, the Alliance for the Future of Austria (BZÖ). He resigned from the party on 7 June 2005 as the result of a controversy (see below), and left its parliamentary fraction on 1 November 2005, sitting the rest of his term as an independent.

=== 2005 controversy ===
On 19 April 2005 Kampl made a speech against the rehabilitation of Austrian armed-forced members who had deserted during World War II. He argued that the deserters were "assassins of battle comrades", and criticized what he called the "brutal persecution" of Austrian Nazis after 1945, saying that "more than 99% of Austrians" had been members of the Nazi Party. He was heavily pressured to resign, and agreed to do so on 28 April. However, about a month later (on 29 May), he said he stood by his views (although he said he may have phrased them differently in retrospect), and would not in fact be resigning. He attributed his decision not to resign partly to what he called the "provocative" manner in which Federal Council President Georg Pehm (a Social Democrat) had demanded he do so. He did, however, resign his membership in the BZÖ, saying he did not want to burden the party with the controversy.

Kampl's backtracking on resignation caused an even bigger controversy because, coincidentally, he was scheduled to take over the six-month rotating presidency of the Federal Council on 1 July. Left-leaning lawmakers demanded that Chancellor Wolfgang Schüssel intervene to prevent Kampl from assuming the presidency of the upper house, and threatened a walkout if he was allowed to do so. In the end, the Federal Council resolved matters itself by passing a constitutional amendment, informally labelled Lex Kampl (Latin for "Kampl's law"), allowing the Council to, by a two-thirds vote, replace anyone scheduled to take over the rotating presidency with a different member of the same party. The amendment was agreed upon by all four main parties (including the FPÖ and BZÖ) and passed unanimously, although BZÖ member Roland Zellot left the chamber before the vote. The amendment entered into force on 25 June, just in time to prevent Kampl from becoming president of the Council.
