= Berthold Landauer =

German painter (died 1430s)

Berthold Landauer (sometimes given as Berchtold) (fl. 1396, d. 1430/1432) was a German painter active in Nuremberg. His name is first mentioned in civic registers, tax lists, and municipal accounts in 1396. In that year he was accepted as a citizen, taking a civic oath under the title of "painter". Tax registers of the St. Sebaldus district record that a "Ber[thold] painter" lived there; according to an entry in 1408's edition of the Harnischbuch, "Berchtold painter" was required to provide a suit of armor upon his conscription into the military. In 1413 is seen the name "Berchtold Landauer" for the first time. In 1421 the master was listed for the first time as a householder. Landauer is known to have married, and to have had three sons; the eldest, Marcus (d. 1468), is included in the recruitment list of 1429 as "Marcus painter". He was dead by 1432, in which year a letter from Sebald Schreyer, master of the church of St. Sebaldus, remembers him as "the late Master Berchtold painter".

Some scholars have attempted to link Landauer with the Master of the Imhoff Altar; these attempts are based on the presence of the two artists in the same city at the same time, and are generally unsupported by stylistic evidence.

== Notes and references ==
- Berthold Landauer
