= Sebald Bopp =

German painter

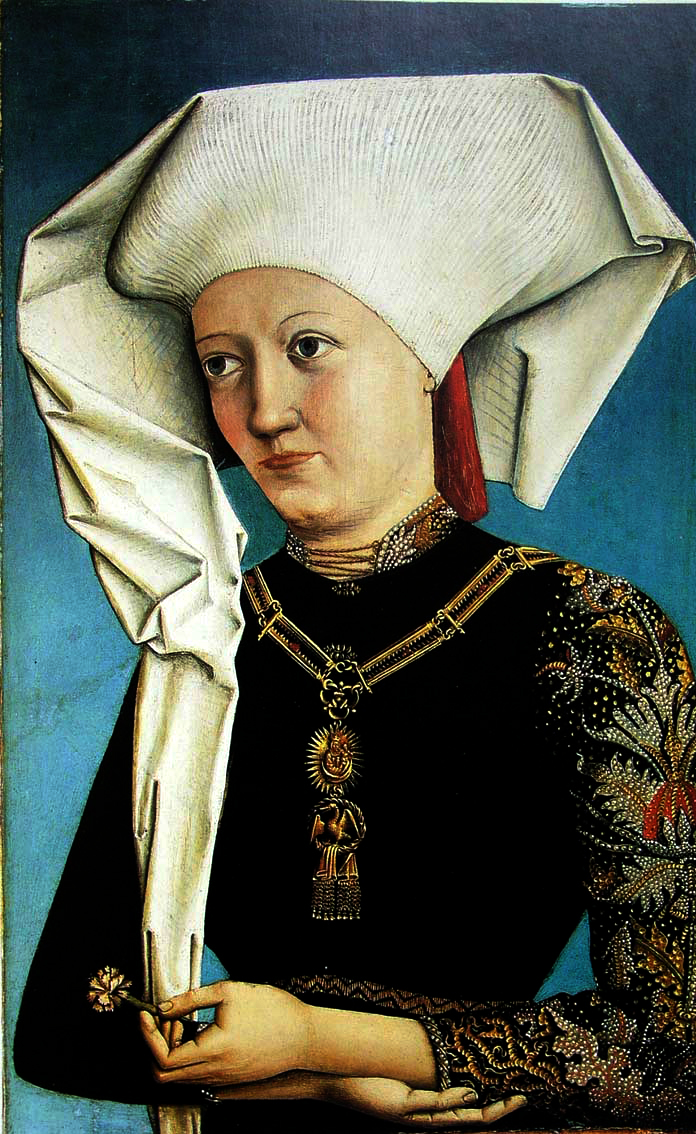
Saint Hemma von Gurk wearing the Order of the Swan, c.1490

Sebald Bopp (died 1502) was a German painter active around Bamberg. Little is known about him; his name is first recorded in Würzburg, where he was listed as a journeyman in 1474, but his earliest known work remains in his native town. This is a depiction of the Sermon of John of Capistrano, painted around 1480 and now in the Neue Residenze in Bamberg.

The style of this painting, filled with representations of bourgeois figures, appears to have been derived from the work of the Master of the Bamberg Altar. After 1480 his activity is recorded in Nuremberg, judging from a Crucifixion memorial plaque, dating to 1483, honoring Peter and Apollonia Volckamer.

Bopp returned to Bamberg at some point before his death; he died there in 1502.
