= Hochrindl =

Mountain pass in Austria

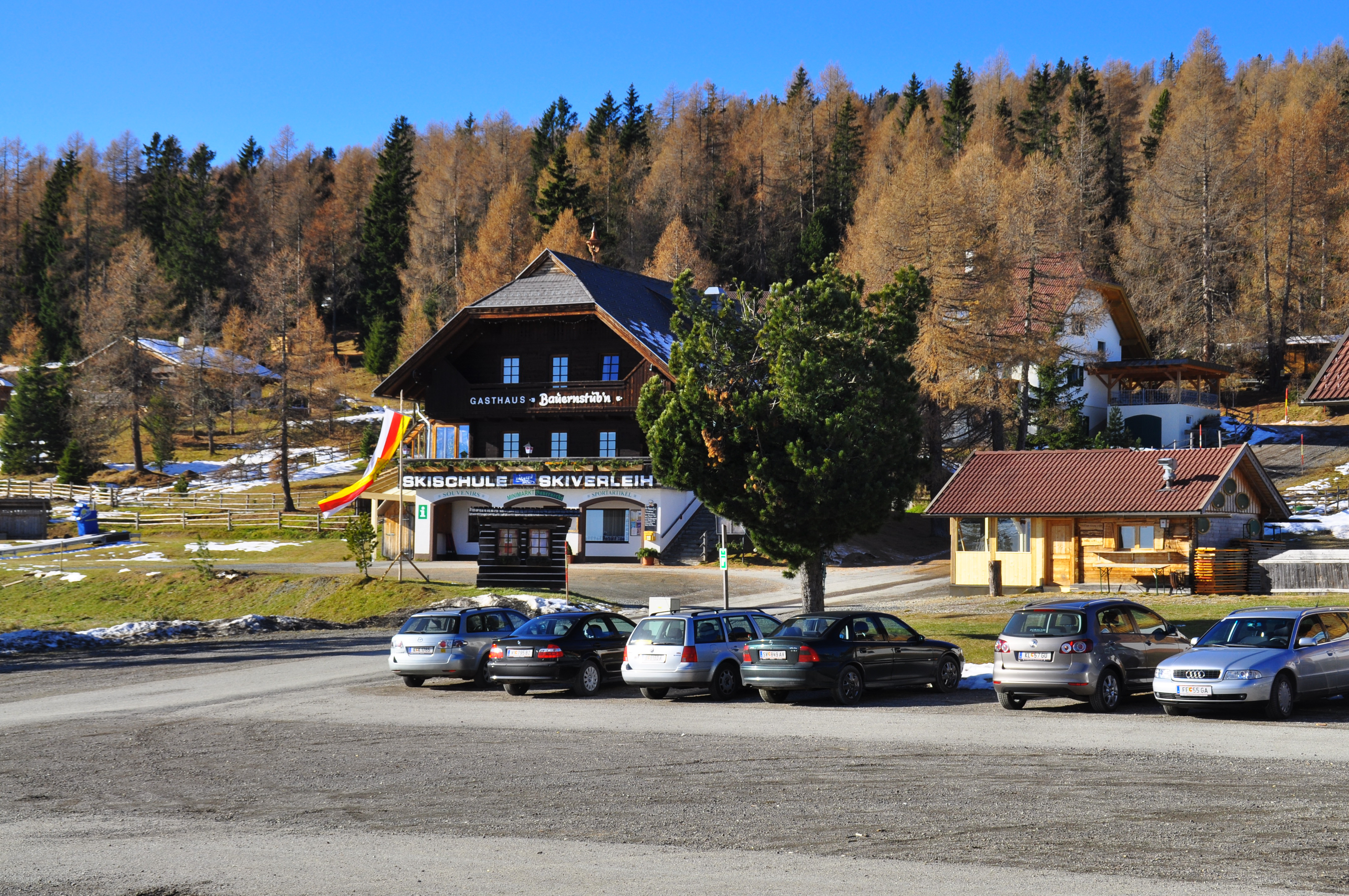
- Ski resort Hochrindl
- Interactive map of Hochrindl
- Elevation: 1,617 metres (5,305 ft)

Third Approach
- Location: Carinthia
- Range: Gurktal Alps
- Coordinates: 46°51′36″N 13°59′39″E

Hochrindl (1,617 metres [5,305 ft]) is a mountain pass and alpine ski resort in the Austrian Alps located between Reichenau and Albeck. The pass was largely uninhabited and used as pasture land until the late 20th century when it became a location for summer and winter tourism.
