= Master of the Bamberg Altar =

German painter

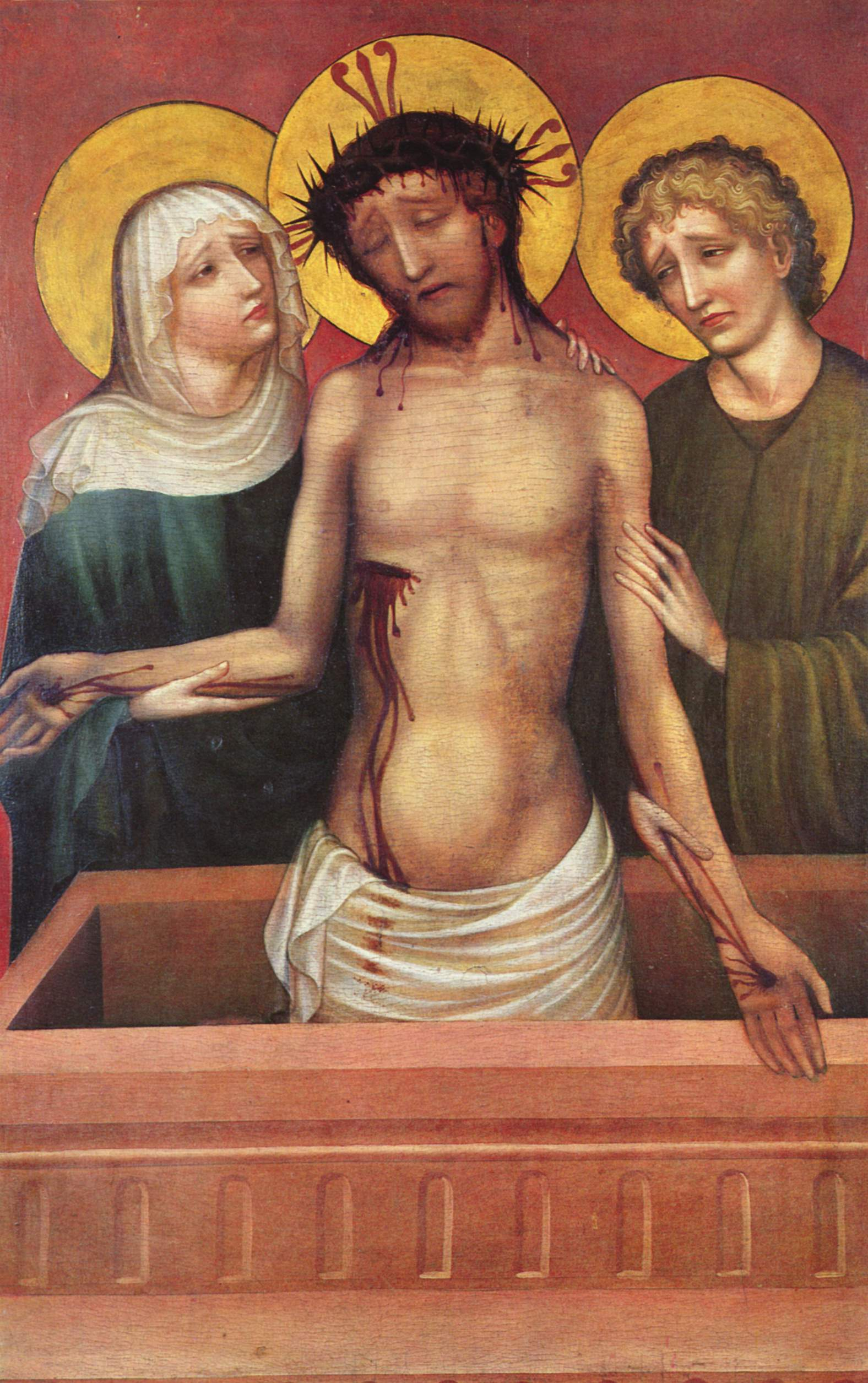
Man of Sorrows (c. 1420). Oil on wood, 116 × 75 cm. In the collection of the Germanisches Nationalmuseum. Formerly attributed to the Master of the Imhoff Altar, this painting is now believed to be by the Master of the Bamberg Altar

The Master of the Bamberg Altar (fl. 1420–1440) was a German painter active in the Nuremberg area. His name is derived from an altarpiece depicting scenes from the Passion, painted in 1429 for the Franciscan church in Bamberg; this may be seen today in the Bavarian National Museum in Munich. Stylistically, the painting appears to be descended from the work of the Nuremberg Master of the Altarpiece of the Virgin.

The Master collaborated with the Master of the Imhoff Altar in the creation of the eponymous altarpiece; his depiction of the Man of Sorrows with the Virgin and Saint John forms the reverse panel. This is a characteristic example of his solemn and simple style. Another, more restrained work is the Man of Sorrows Standing with the Virgin, today in the Germanisches Nationalmuseum.

The Master of the Bamberg Altar seems to have depended strongly on facial types and figure styles derived from Bohemian painting; he seems especially to have known the work of the Master of the Třeboň Altarpiece, although his figures are more block-like and solid and less elegant than those of the latter artist. He would appear to be moving away from the International Gothic and towards a more Italian-derived style, based especially on work from Altichiero.

Among the local artists who appear to have derived some of their style from the Master is Sebald Bopp.
