= Master of the Imhoff Altar =

German painter

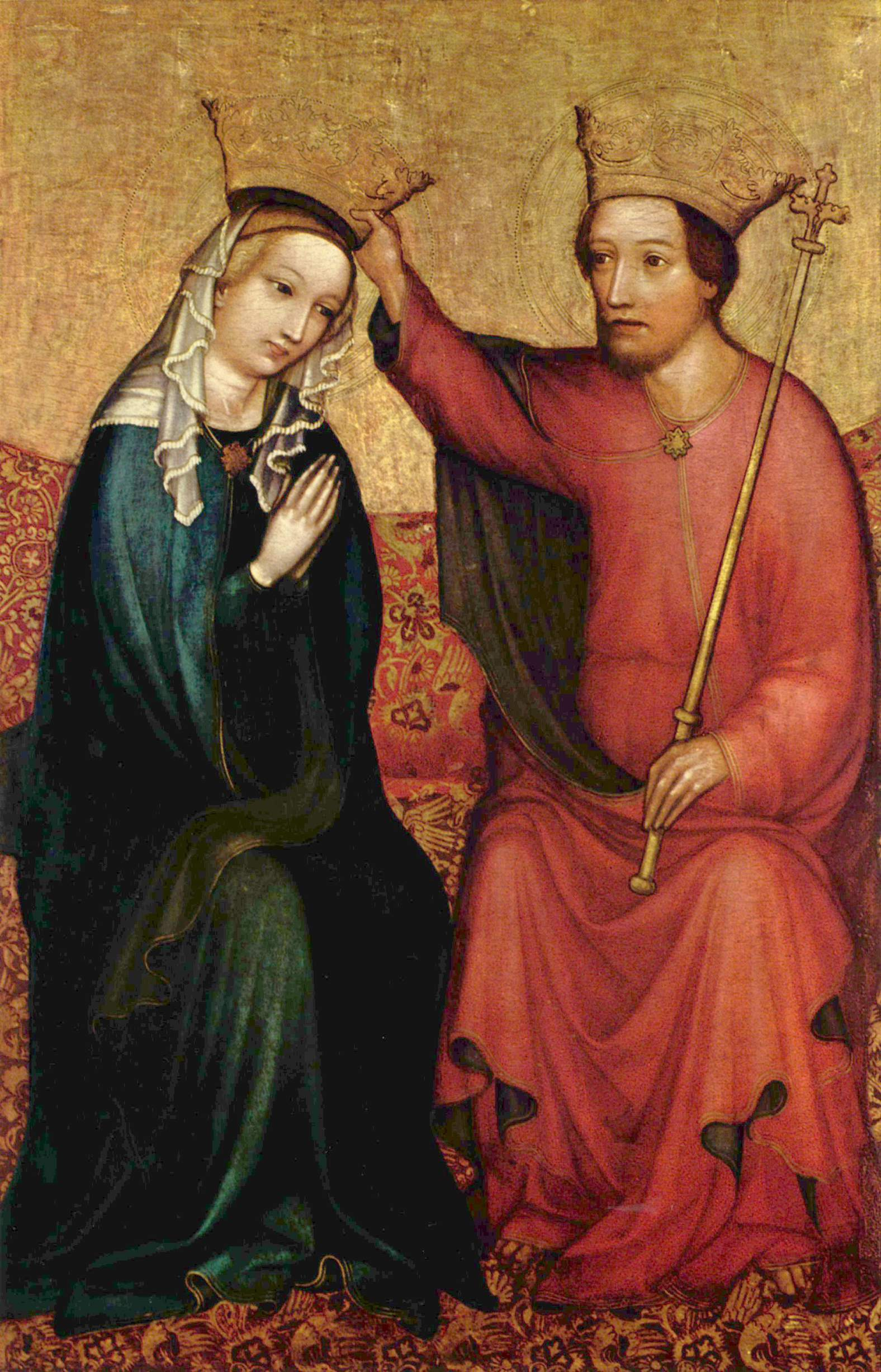
The Coronation of the Virgin (c. 1418–1422), oil on wood. In the Lorenzkirche, Nuremberg

The Master of the Imhoff Altar (fl. c. 1410–1420) was a German painter. His name comes from an altarpiece, dating to between 1418 and 1422, commissioned by Konrad Imhoff for the Lorenzkirche in Nuremberg. Only the central panel, depicting the Coronation of the Virgin, and the wings, depicting several apostles, are still preserved in the church, albeit partially disassembled. On the inner wings, flanking the Coronation, may be found a donor portrait of the donor with three of his four wives. Originally the back of the altarpiece held an image of Christ as the Man of Sorrows, with the Virgin Mary and Saint John. This piece, which has since been moved to the Germanisches Nationalmuseum, is now believed to be the work of the Master of the Bamberg Altar.

It is believed by some historians that the Master of the Imhoff Altar is also the so-called Master of the Deichsler Altarpiece, whose work is known from two surviving altarpiece wings in Berlin. Attempts have been made to link both artists to Berthold Landauer, but these have been based entirely on his activity in Nuremberg at the time in question. The Deischler paintings are believed to predate the Imhoff Altar by five to ten years, and are the work of an artist deeply familiar with the art of Bohemia from around 1400. The Imhoff Altar, by contrast, represents a marked shift towards a firmer and sparer manner, coupled with the use of stronger colors.
