= Gurk, Carinthia =

Gurk
- Municipality
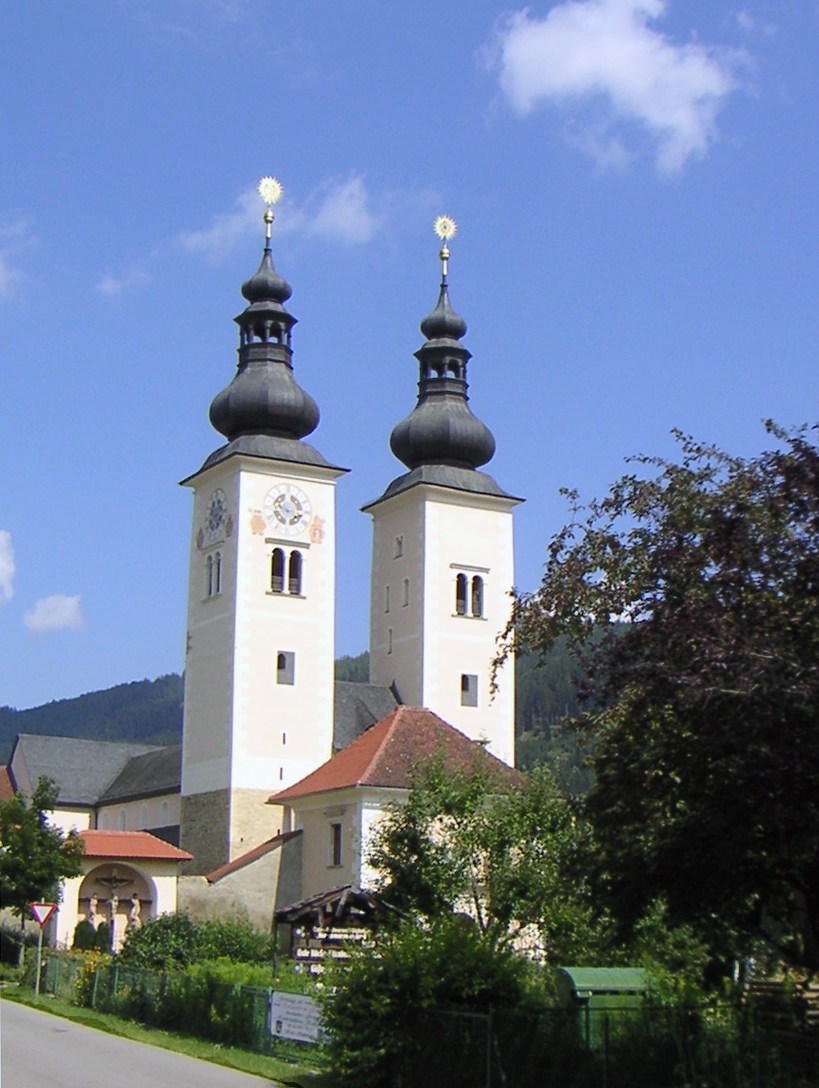

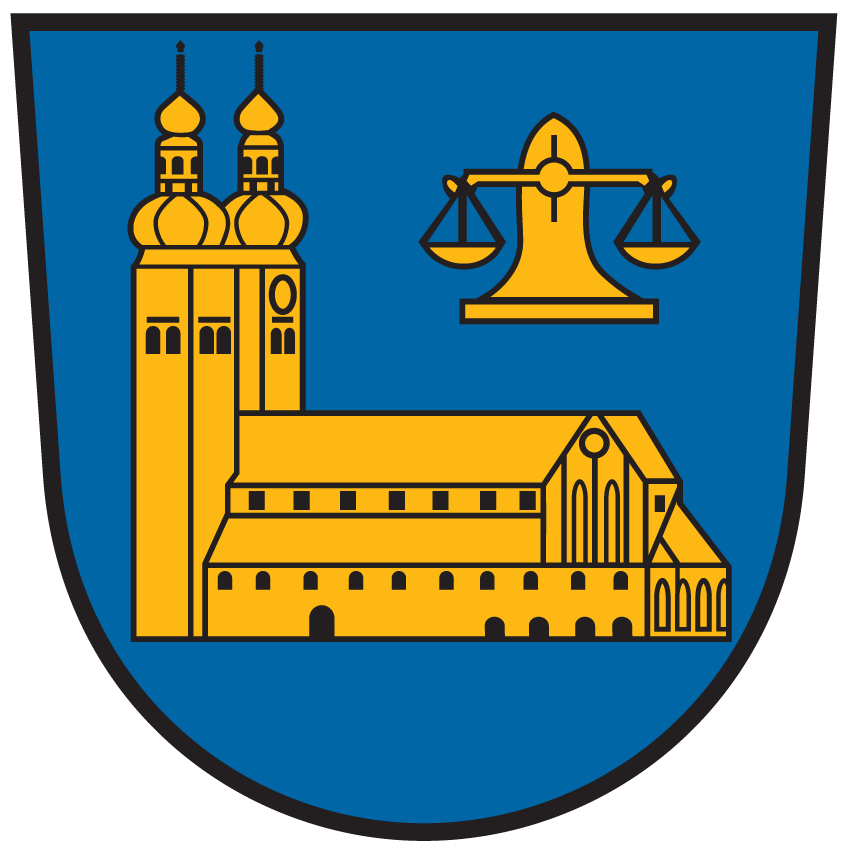
- Coat of arms

- Location within Carinthia Location within Austria
- Coordinates: 46°53′N 14°17′E
- Country: Austria
- State: Carinthia
- District: Sankt Veit an der Glan

Government
  - Mayor: Siegfried Wuzella (FPÖ)

Area
  - Total: 39.67 km^{2} (15.32 sq mi)
- Elevation: 662 m (2,172 ft)

Population (2018-01-01)
  - Total: 1,226
  - Density: 30.90/km^{2} (80.04/sq mi)
- Time zone: UTC+1 (CET)
  - Summer (DST): UTC+2 (CEST)
- Postal code: 9342
- Area code: 04266
- Website: www.gurk.at

Gurk (Slovene: Krka) is an Austrian market town and former episcopal see in the District of Sankt Veit an der Glan, Carinthia. As of 1 January 2025, Gurk has a population of 1,178.

== Geography ==
The community of Gurk is surrounded by alpine meadows and vast high forests. It marks the center of the sparsely populated Gurk Valley. Downstream on the Gurk, lies the small town of Straßburg, from whose fortress the Prince-Bishops of Gurk reigned.

=== Municipal subdivisions ===
Gurk can be divided into three catastral municipalities (Katastralgemeinden) (Population as of 1 January 2025):

- Gruska (80)
- Gurk (895)
- Pisweg (203)

Communities: Dörfl, Finsterdorf, Föbing, Gassarest, Glanz, Gruska, Gurk, Gwadnitz, Hundsdorf, Kreuzberg, Krön, Masternitzen, Niederdorf, Pisweg, Ranitz, Reichenhaus, Straßa, Sutsch, Zabersdorf, Zedl, Zedroß, Zeltschach

=== Neighboring municipalities ===
- Straßburg
- Weitensfeld im Gurktal
- Mölbling
- Frauenstein

== History ==
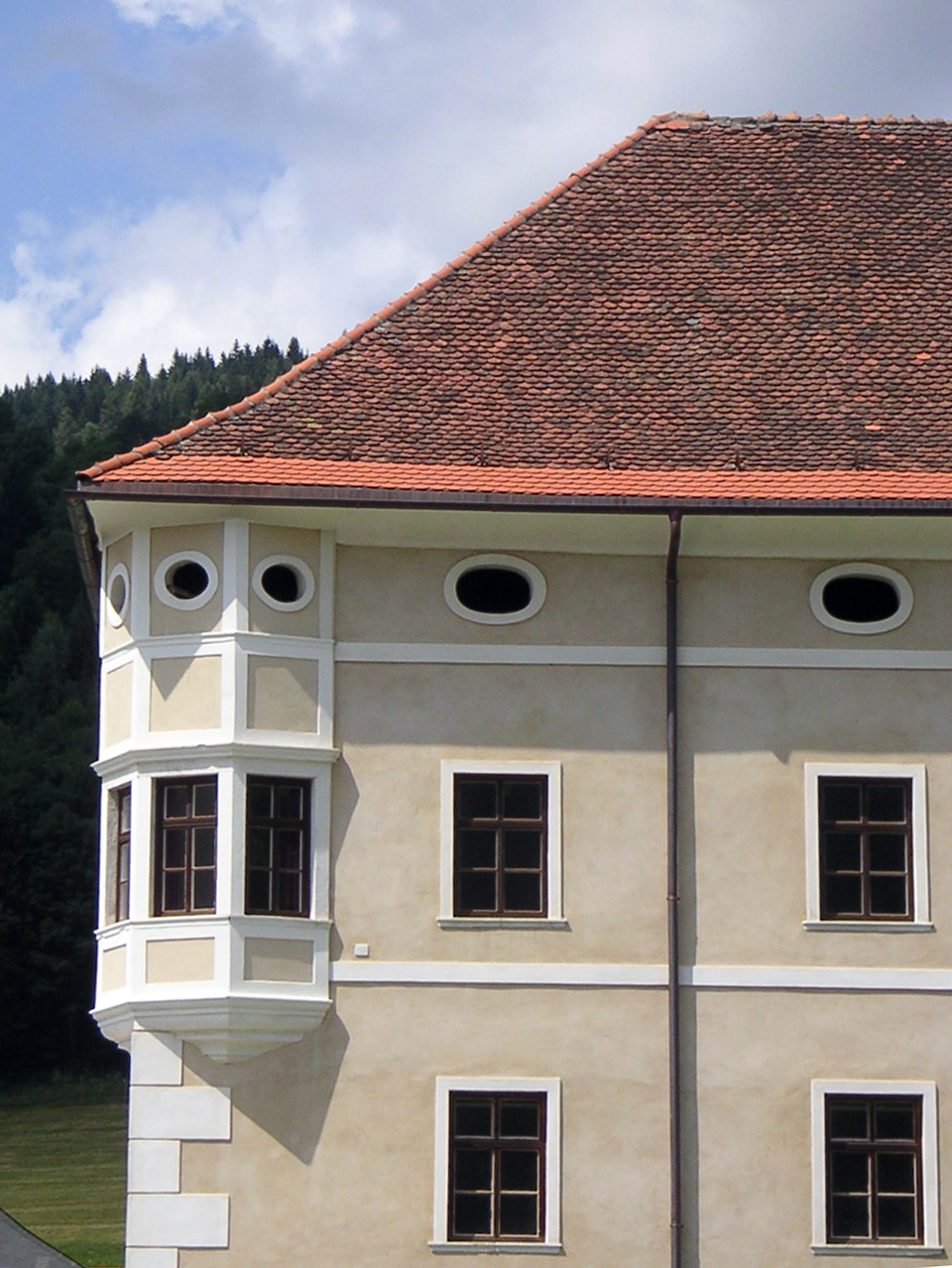
Cloister

The name Gurk ("die Gurgelnde" or "the Gurgling one") comes from the river of the same name. The area was settled around 2000 years ago, but it only achieved any importance after Carinthia was incorporated by Bavaria.

After the death of her husband and her sons, Saint Hemma of Gurk founded a religious house on the market place of what is now Gurk. However, Gurk Abbey did not have a long existence: its site was used in 1072 for the cathedral and bishop's palace of the newly founded diocese of Gurk by the Archbishop of Salzburg, whose seat was in the northern part of Carinthia. Gurk was the bishop's seat until 1787; his residence is now located in Klagenfurt.

On June 25, 1988, Pope John Paul II visited the cathedral and prayed in the crypt at the grave of Saint Hemma. The first papal visit in the history of Carinthia was a big media event and brought a thousand men to an open-air mass in front of the cathedral.

Gurk was named a "European Municipality" by the Council of Europe in 1998.

=== Ecclesiastical history ===
See Roman Catholic Diocese of Gurk

== Politics ==
The municipal council (Gemeinderat) consists of 15 members. Since the 2021 Carinthian local elections, it is made up of the following parties:

- Freedom Party of Austria (FPÖ): 8 seats
- Social Democratic Party of Austria (SPÖ): 3 seats
- Austrian People's Party (ÖVP): 3 seats
- The Greens - The Green Alternative (GRÜNE): 1 seat

The mayor of Gurk, Siegfried Wuzella (FPÖ), was elected in 2021.

== Main sights ==
- Gurk Cathedral

== Notable people ==
- Hemma of Gurk (c.995-1045): Catholic Saint

== Sources and references ==
- this article is partially based on a translation of its German equivalent.
