= Klagenfurt Cathedral =

Church building in Klagenfurt, Austria

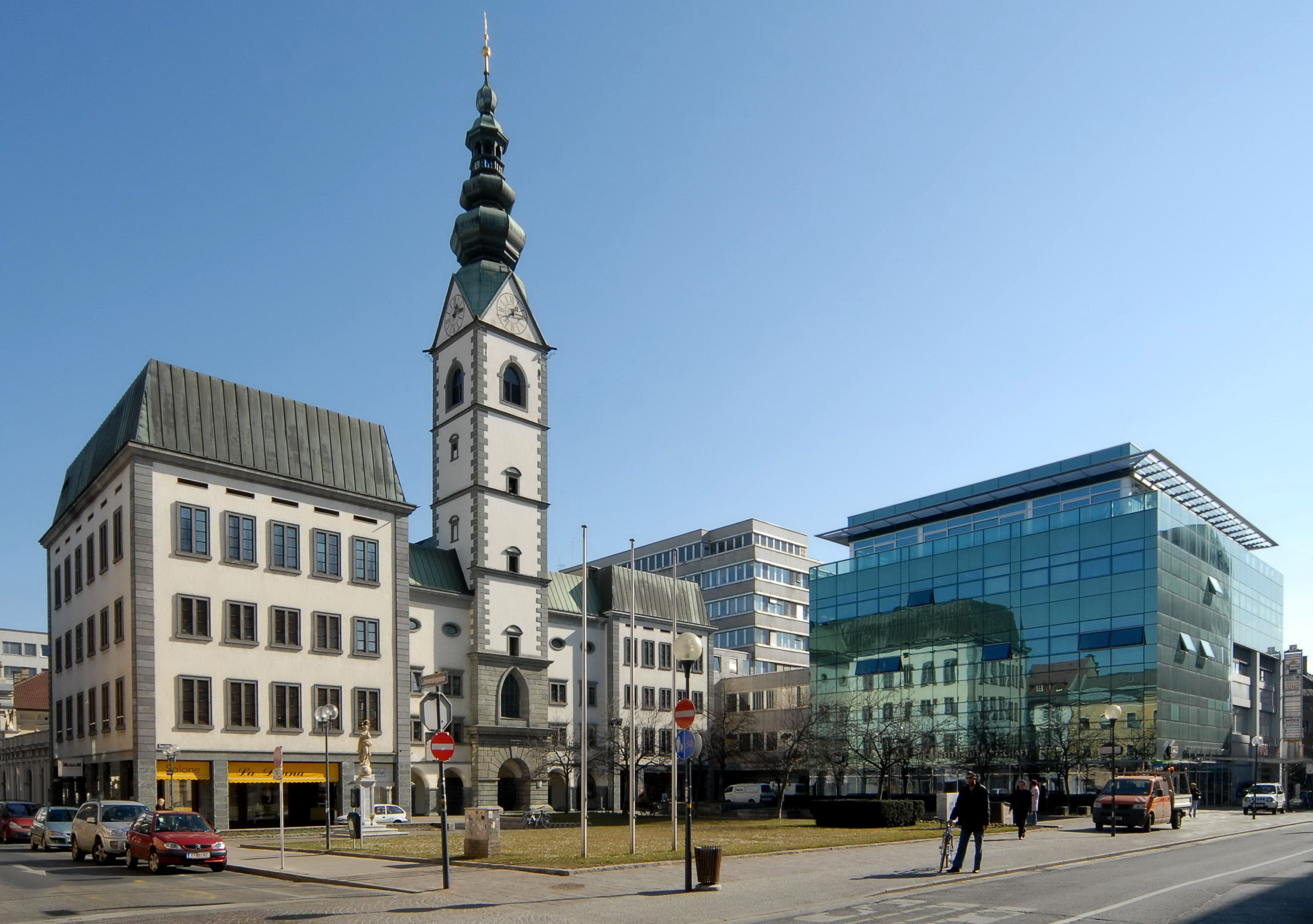
- The cathedral with the Domplatz in the foreground

- Location within Austria

Religion
- Affiliation: Catholic Church
- Rite: Latin
- Ecclesiastical or organizational status: Cathedral

Location
- Location: Klagenfurt, Austria
- Interactive map of Klagenfurt Cathedral
- Coordinates: 46.623991°N 14.312207°E

Architecture
- Style: Baroque

Klagenfurt Cathedral (German: Klagenfurter Dom; Dom- und Stadtpfarrkirche Hll. Petrus und Paulus) is the cathedral of the Roman Catholic Diocese of Gurk-Klagenfurt and the main parish church of Klagenfurt. It was built by Protestants and dedicated to the Holy Trinity in 1581. It was the largest Protestant church in Austria at that time.

== History ==
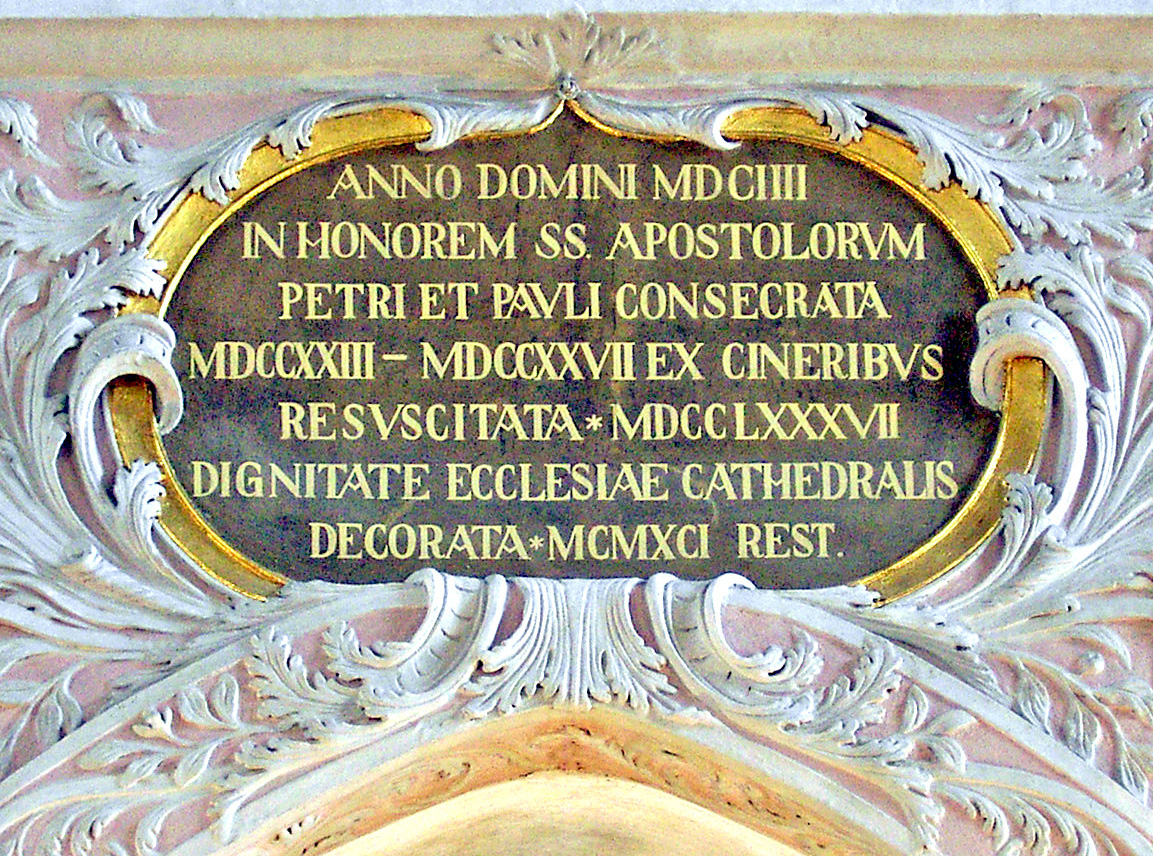
The Anno Domini inscription at the Klagenfurt Cathedral.

Klagenfurt Cathedral was commissioned by Christoph Windisch, Klagenfurt's first mayor. In 1600, during the Counter-Reformation, it was given to the Jesuits and rededicated to Saints Peter and Paul. The church was razed to the ground by a fire and had to be rebuilt in 1724. Bishop Franz Xaver von Salm-Reifferscheid made it the cathedral of the Diocese of Gurk in 1787.

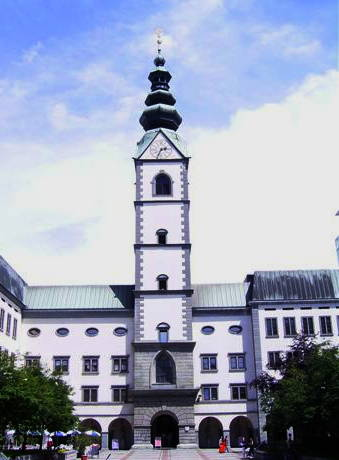
Front view of the Klagenfurt Cathedral

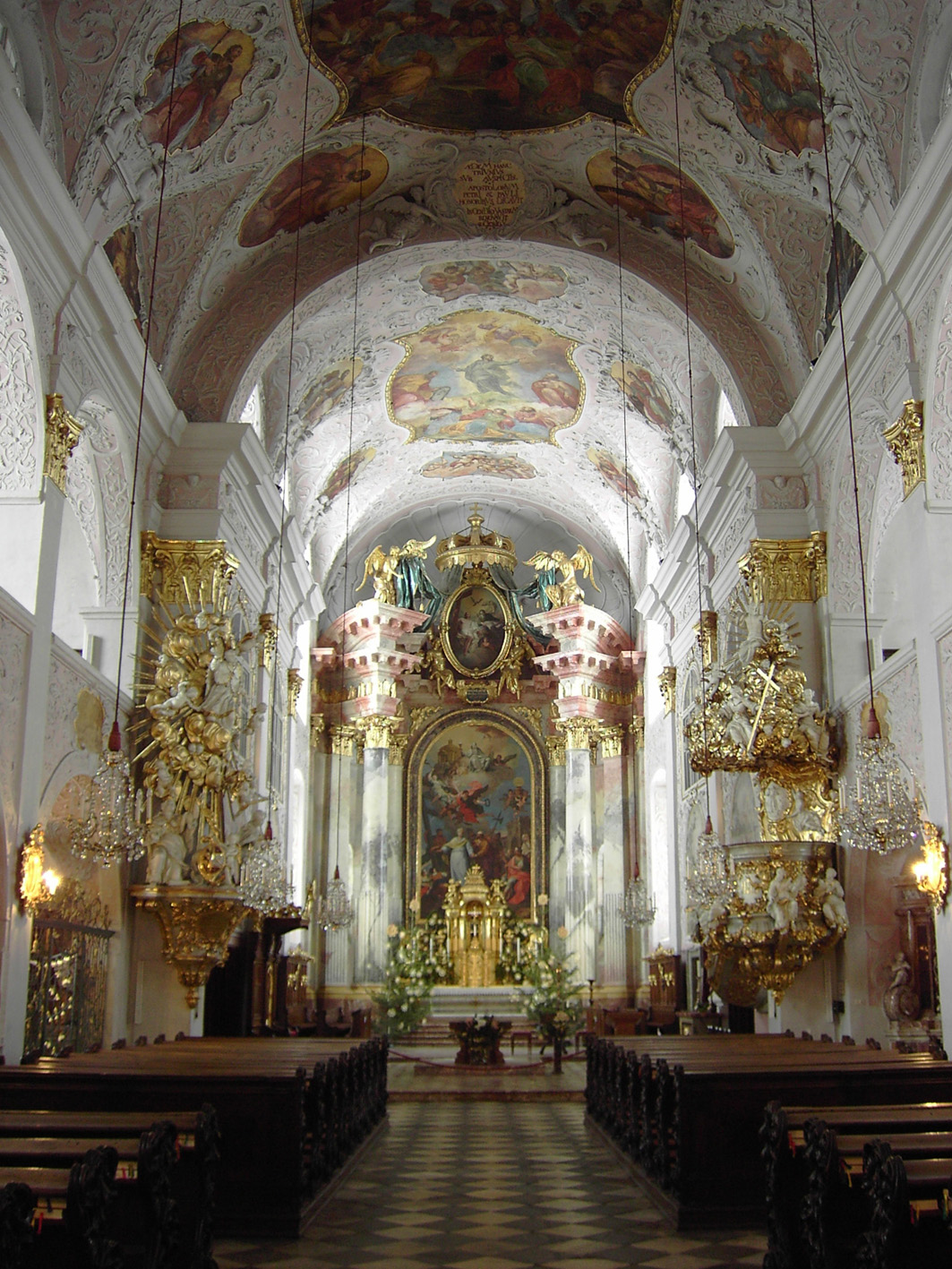
Interior of the cathedral

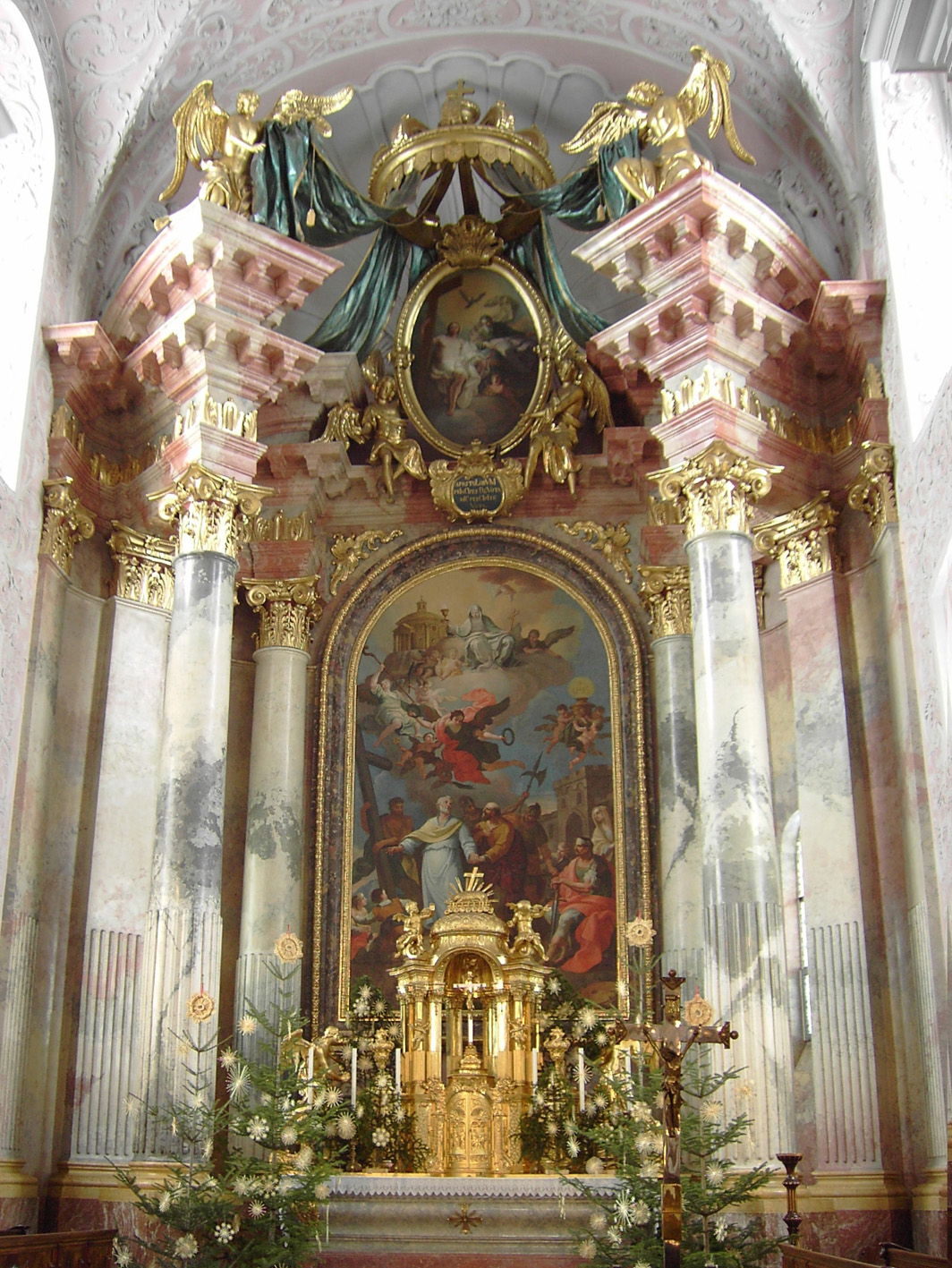
The cathedral's altar

== See also ==
- List of Jesuit sites
