= Hemma of Gurk =

11th-century Carinthian noblewoman

- Born: c. 980 (973 by some sources)
- Died: 29 June 1045 (aged 64–65); Gurk, Carinthia
- Occupations: aristocrat, countess, Fürstin (princess)
- Title: Margravine an der Sann

Saint Hemma of Gurk
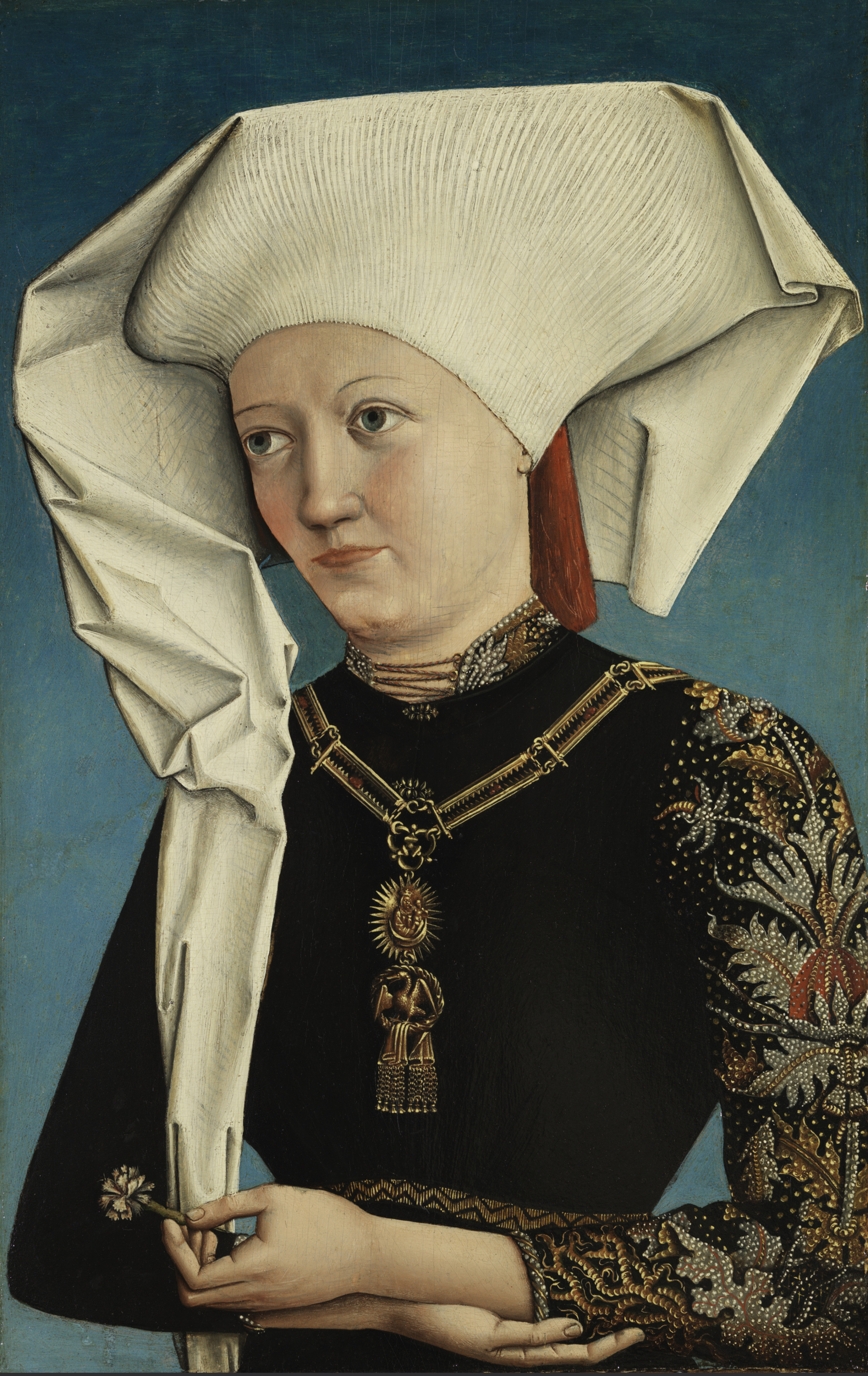
- Hemma of Gurk Wearing the Order of the Swan by Sebald Bopp, c. 1500
- Born: c. 980
- Died: 29 June 1045 (aged 64–65); Gurk, Carinthia
- Venerated in: Roman Catholic Church; Eastern Orthodox Church
- Beatified: 21 November 1287
- Canonized: 5 January 1938 by Pope Pius XI
- Major shrine: Crypt of Gurk Cathedral
- Feast: 27 June
- Attributes: Depicted as a noble lady with either a model of a church, a legal deed or a rose, or distributing alms.
- Patronage: Diocese of Gurk-Klagenfurt; State of Carinthia; invoked during childbirth and against diseases of the eye; extreme hangovers

Hemma of Gurk (German: Hemma von Gurk; c. 980 – 29 June 1045), also called Emma of Gurk (Slovene: Ema Krška), was a noblewoman, Fürstin (princess) and founder of several churches and monasteries in the Duchy of Carinthia. Buried at Gurk Cathedral since 1174, she was beatified on 21 November 1287 and canonised on 5 January 1938 by Pope Pius XI. Her feast day is 27 June. Hemma is venerated as a saint by both the Catholic Church and the Eastern Orthodox Church, and as patroness of the current Austrian state of Carinthia.

== Biography ==
Little is known about Hemma's descent; she was probably born around 980 (some sources mention 973 AD), her ancestors were related to the Bavarian Luitpoldings and thus to Emperor Henry II. Her grandmother Imma (Emma) was vested with market and minting rights at her estates in Lieding (today part of Straßburg) by Emperor Otto II in 975. The bestowal raised objections by the Archbishop of Salzburg and the privileges were later transferred to Gurk, Carinthia. According to her hagiography, Hemma was a member of a noble dynasty descending from Pilštanj (Peilenstein) in the Mark an der Sann (in present-day Slovenian Styria) and was brought up at the Imperial court in Bamberg by Empress Saint Cunigunde.

Hemma married the Carinthian count William II of Friesach, mentioned as margrave an der Sann in 1016, by whom she had two sons, Hartwig and William. Her husband had received vast estates on the Savinja (Sann) river from the hands of the Emperor. Both her sons and her husband were murdered, Margrave William II probably in 1036 by the deposed duke Adalbero of Carinthia in revenge. Hemma became even more wealthy through inheritance upon the death of her husband and sons.

Countess Hemma used her great wealth for the benefit of the poor and was already venerated as a saint during her lifetime. In addition, she founded ten churches throughout present-day Carinthia, Austria. In 1043 she founded the Benedictine double monastery of Gurk Abbey, where she withdrew during the last years of her life.

After her death, Gurk Abbey was dissolved by the Archbishop of Salzburg, Gebhard, who instead used the funds to set up the Diocese of Gurk-Klagenfurt in 1072. Admont Abbey, another Benedictine foundation in Austria, was founded in 1074 by the same Gebhard, and also owes its existence to Hemma's wealth. Since 1174 Hemma's relics have been buried in the crypt of Gurk Cathedral.

Her feast day is celebrated on 27 June because her death date, 29 June, corresponds to the Feast of Saints Peter and Paul.

== Emma pilgrimage ==
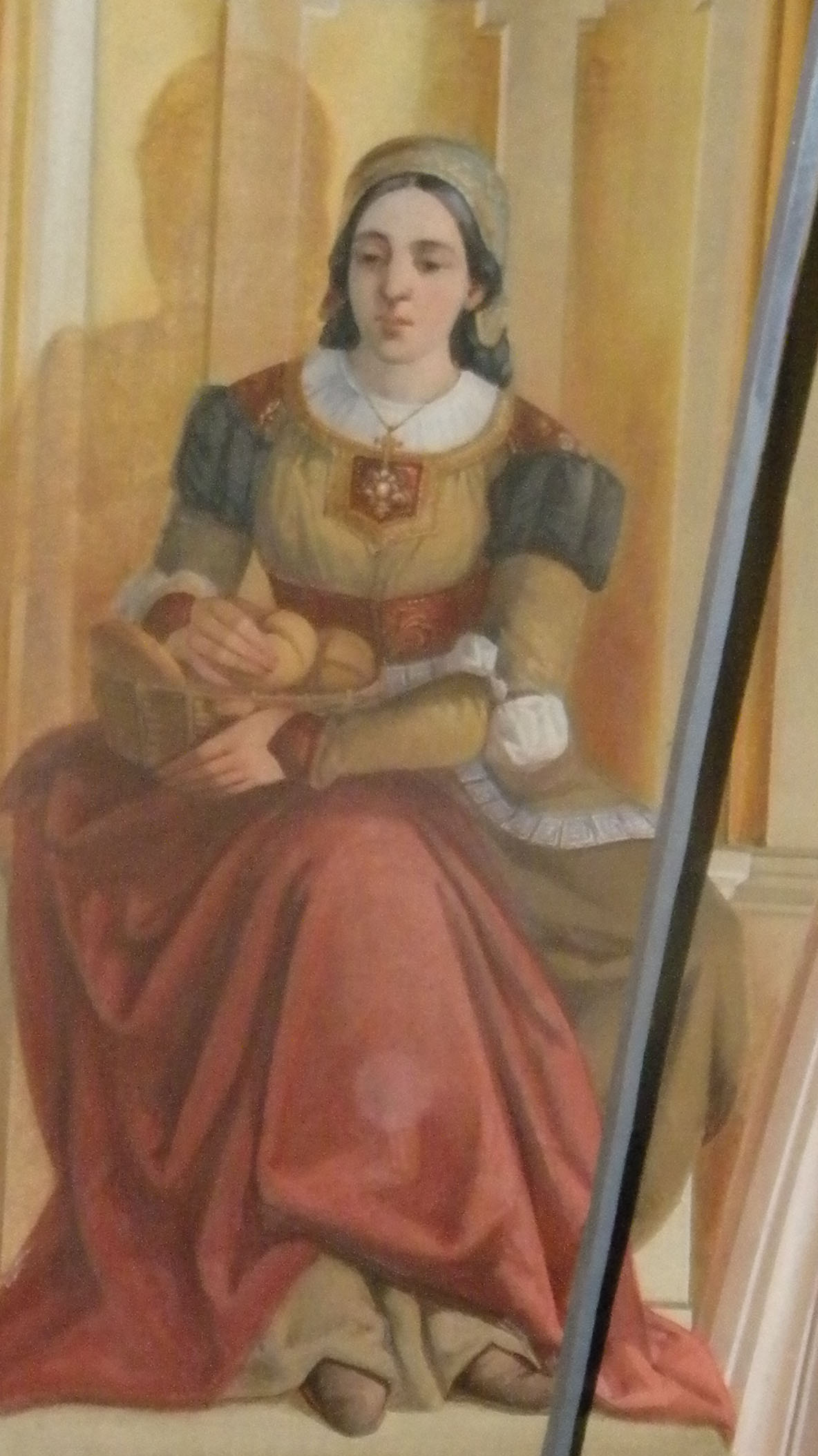
Fresco of Saint Hemma in St. Leonard's Parish Church, Nova Cerkev (Municipality of Vojnik, Slovenia)

Saint Hemma is the patron saint of the Roman Catholic Diocese of Gurk and her intercession is sought for childbirth and diseases of the eye. She is venerated not only in Carinthia (the Austrian state coterminous with the Diocese of Gurk), but also in neighboring Styria (another Austrian state) and Slovenia. From about 300 years ago, the pious and those seeking assistance have been coming to her tomb in Gurk Cathedral, travelling from Carniola over the Loibl Pass. This pilgrimage took place every year on the fourth Sunday after Easter, but fell out of use as a result of the political circumstances of the 20th century.

In recent years, however, the routes of pilgrimage from Slovenia and Styria to Gurk have gradually reopened and are becoming increasingly used.
