= Gebhard of Salzburg =

Catholic archbishop of Salzburg (c. 1010–1088)

Blessed Gebhard von Salzburg (c. 1010 – 15 June 1088), also occasionally known as Gebhard of Sussex, was Archbishop of Salzburg from 1060 until his death. He was one of the fiercest opponents of King Henry IV of Germany during the Investiture Controversy.

== Life ==
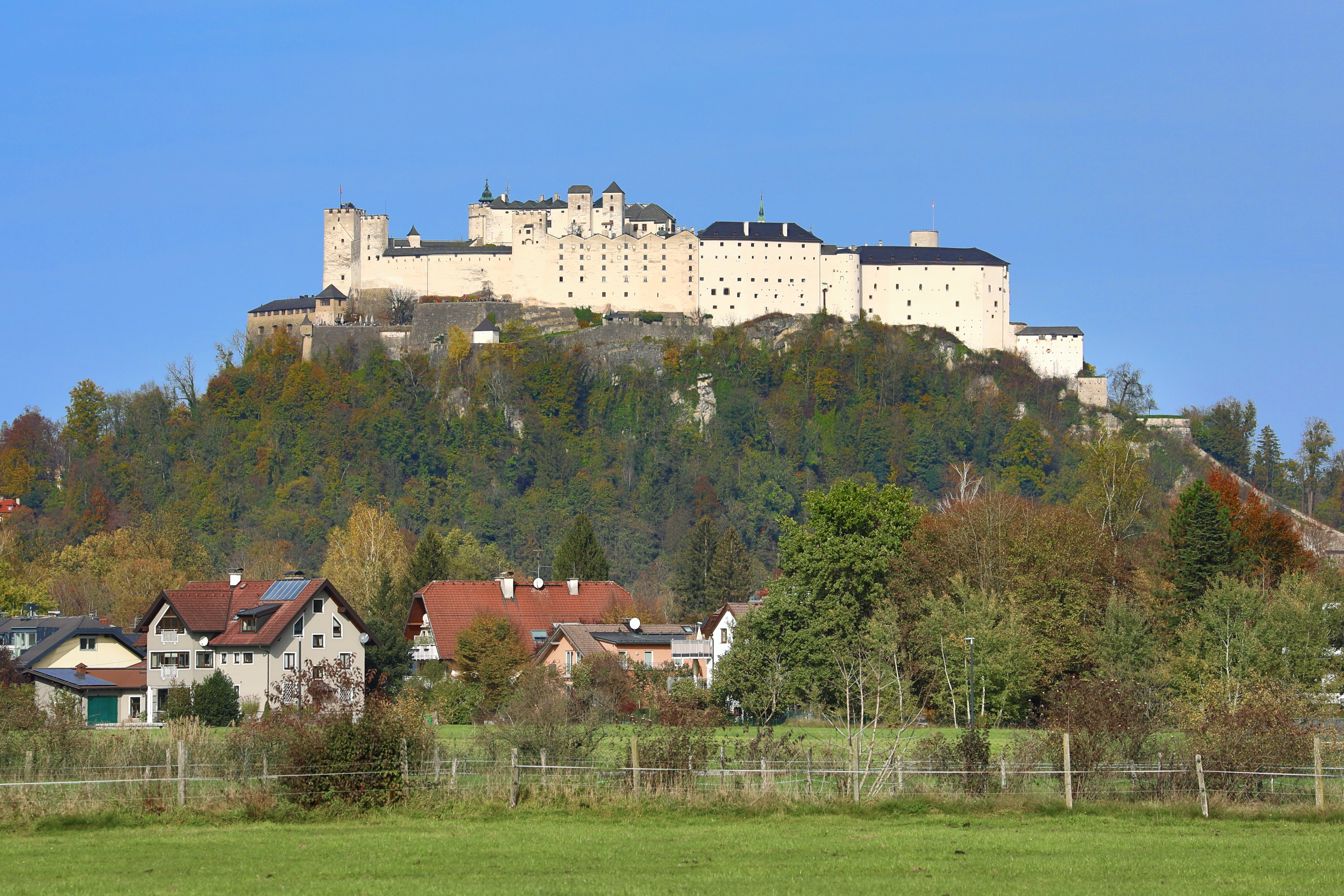
Hohensalzburg Fortress

Of Gebhard's origins, all that is known for certain is that he was born in the German stem duchy of Swabia. Although he appeared in a 17th-century genealogy by Gabriel Bucelin as a scion of the comital House of Helfenstein, this lineage is entirely speculative. Gebhard presumably studied in Paris, was ordained a priest at Salzburg in 1055 and became court chaplain to Emperor Henry III. Then a loyal supporter of the Salian dynasty, he also travelled as an ambassador to the Byzantine court at Constantinople and held the office of an Imperial chancellor between 1057 and 1059.

On 30 July 1060 he was consecrated bishop of the Archdiocese of Salzburg. He reorganized the tithes paid by the Carantanian peasants and the parish system in Carinthia, where in 1072 he dissolved the double monastery of Gurk Abbey, founded by Saint Hemma in 1043, and replaced it by the suffragan Diocese of Gurk. Gebhard also established Admont Abbey in 1074, vested with Hemma's estates in the Carinthian March of Styria. Besides this, he had the fortresses Hohensalzburg, Hohenwerfen and Friesach built.

In 1075, Gebhard supported the German king Henry IV struggling with the Great Saxon Revolt. In the following Investiture Controversy, however, he took the side of Pope Gregory VII. Like his friend bishop Altmann of Passau he did not attend the 1076 Synod of Worms held by the king and instead allied with the oppositional princes at the diet of Trebur later in that year. Even after Henry's Road to Canossa, Gebhard supported the election of anti-king Rudolf of Rheinfelden in March 1077; as Gebhard was unwilling to be reconciled with the king, Henry IV expelled him from Salzburg. While his diocese was devastated by the king's forces, Gebhard spent nine years in Swabia and Saxony, trying to win their bishops' support for Pope Gregory VII. Meanwhile in Salzburg, Berthold von Moosburg was installed as anti-bishop in 1085. Gebhard was not able to return to Salzburg until 1086, assisted by the support of Duke Welf I of Bavaria.

Gebhard died at Hohenwerfen on 15 June 1088 and is buried in the church of Admont Abbey. His feast day is 15 June. He is shown as a bishop with a Greek cross and a unicorn. In 1629 the process of canonization was begun, but was effectively put on hold due to the Thirty Years' War. It has never been concluded.

== Sources ==
- Amon, Karl, 1991: Die heiligen Bischöfe und Erzbischöfe der Kirche von Salzburg. In: Sursum Corda, Festschrift für P. Harnoncourt.
- Freed, John B. (2016). Frederick Barbarossa: The Prince and the Myth. Yale University Press.
- Karner, Pius, 1913: Austria Sancta. Die Heiligen und Seligen Salzburgs. Vienna.
- Tomek, Ernst, 1935-59: Kirchengeschichte Österreichs. Innsbruck/Vienna/Munich: Tyrolia.
- Wimmer, Otto, Melzer, Hartmann, Gelmi, Josef (eds.), 2002: Gebhard Erzb. von Salzburg. In: Lexikon der Namen und Heiligen. Hamburg: Nikol. ISBN 3-933203-63-5
- Wodka, Josef, 1959: Kirche in Österreich. Wegweiser durch ihre Geschichte. Vienna: Herder.
- Wodka, Josef, 1960: Gebhard EB v. Salzburg. In: Lexikon für Theologie und Kirche. 2nd edition, vol. 4. Freiburg i. B.: Herder.

Preceded by Baldwin	Archbishop of Salzburg; 1060–1088	Succeeded by Thiemo
