= Diocese of Gurk-Klagenfurt =

Catholic ecclesiastical territory

Coordinates: 46.6221°N 14.3094°E

Diocese of Gurk-Klagenfurt Dioecesis Gurcensis Diözese Gurk-Klagenfurt Krška škofija

Catholic
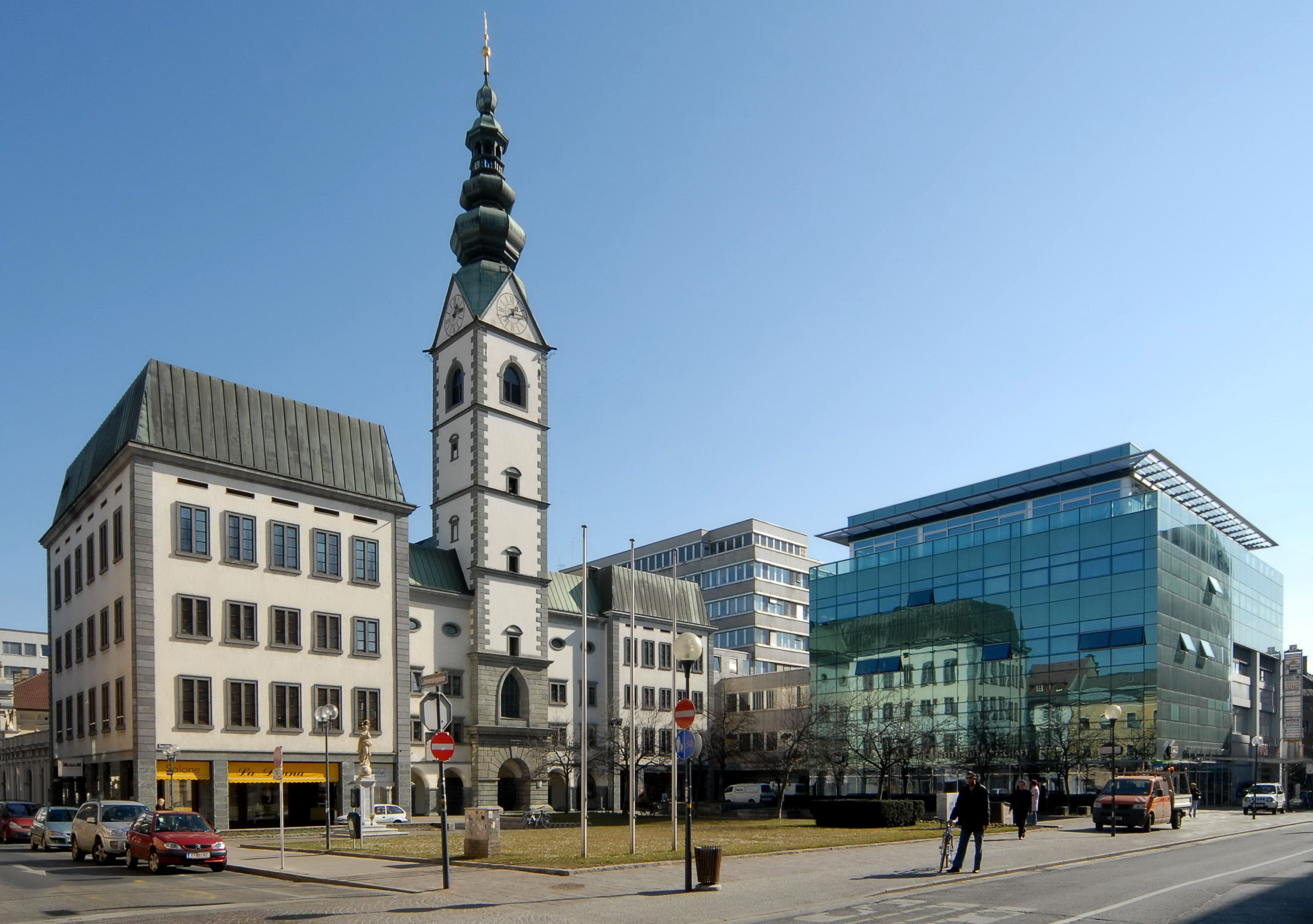
- Klagenfurt Cathedral

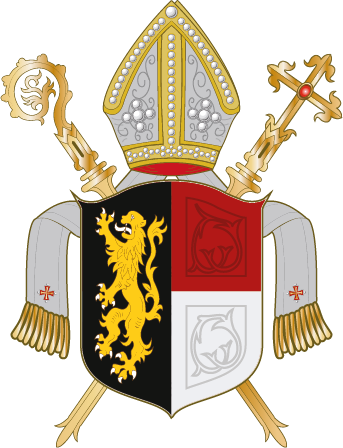
- Coat of arms

Location
- Country: Austria
- Territory: Carinthia
- Ecclesiastical province: Salzburg
- Metropolitan: Archdiocese of Salzburg

Statistics
- Area: 9,533 km^{2} (3,681 sq mi)
- Population: Total; Catholics: (as of 2019); 560,983; 363,505 (64.8%)
- Parishes: 336

Information
- Denomination: Roman Catholic
- Rite: Roman Rite
- Established: March 6, 1071
- Cathedral: Dom Sankt Peter und Paul, Klagenfurt
- Co-cathedral: Dom Maria Himmelfahrt, Gurk, Carinthia
- Patron saint: Saint Hemma; John the Baptist
- Secular priests: 188 (diocesan); 55 (Religious Orders); 49 Permanent Deacons

Current leadership
- Pope: Leo XIV
- Bishop: Josef Marketz
- Metropolitan Archbishop: Franz Lackner
- Apostolic Administrator: Werner Freistetter

Map
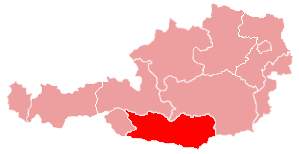

Website
- Website of the Diocese

The Diocese of Gurk-Klagenfurt (German: Diözese Gurk-Klagenfurt, Slovene: Krška škofija) is a Latin Church diocese of the Catholic Church covering the Austrian state of Carinthia. It is part of the ecclesiastical province of Salzburg. Though named after Gurk Cathedral, the bishop's see since 1787 has been in Klagenfurt.

Due to the presence of Carinthian Slovenes, the organizational structures of the diocese are bilingual. The Slovene language is, together with German, the language of church services in 69 southern parishes of the diocese.

== History ==
=== Middle Ages ===
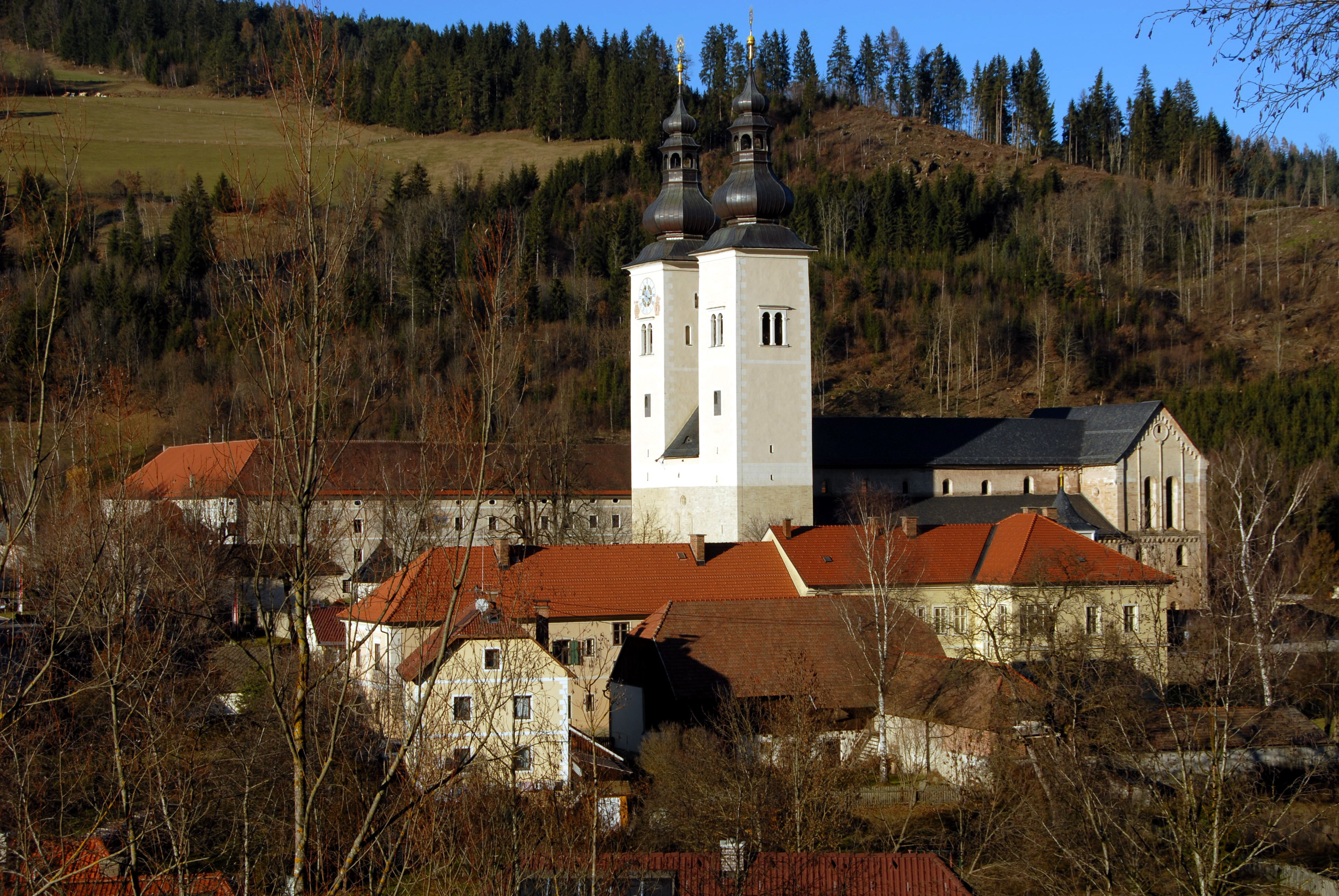
Gurk Cathedral

In a letter of Pope Alexander II of 21 March 1070, the pope conceded that the diocese of Salzburg was too large to be governed by a single bishop; but nonetheless it could not be subdivided except with the consent of Archbishop Gebhard or his successors. On 6 May 1072 a suffragan bishopric in the Duchy of Carinthia, subordinate to the Archdiocese of Salzburg, was erected by Archbishop Gebhard of Salzburg, with the consent of Emperor Henry IV (4 February 1072). It was financed by the properties of a former nunnery in Gurk founded by Countess Hemma in 1043. On 17 June 1075, however, Pope Gregory VII admonished Archbishop Gebhard of Salzburg that he had not yet assigned to his diocese of Gurk its decimae, and that he should do so.

The episcopal residence was not in Gurk, but at Strassburg Castle, two miles to the northeast. Initially the bishops of Gurk only held the rights of vicars, while the right of appointment, consecration, and investiture was reserved to the archbishop of Salzburg. The bishops of Gurk attempted nonetheless to make themselves independent. The first bishop, a local noble Günther von Krapffeld, was consecrated by Archbishop Gebhard on 6 May 1072.

The diocese of Gurk served as a model for later diocesan creations by the archbishops of Salzburg: the Bishopric of Chiemsee (1216), the Diocese of Seckau (1218), and the Diocese of Lavant (1228).

In 1123, Bishop Hildebold of Gurk established a congregation of clerics in the church of S. Mary in Gurk, headed by a provost, who were to live according to the Rule of Saint Augustine. It was not until 1123 that Archbishop Conrad I of Salzburg founded a cathedral chapter at Gurk. The boundaries of the diocese were only defined by Archbishop Conrad on 17 July 1131. Originally the territory embraced was small, but the jurisdiction of the Bishop of Gurk extended beyond the limits of his diocese, inasmuch as he was also vicar-general of that part of Carinthia under the Archbishop of Salzburg. The rights of a secular Vogt advocate were held by the Carinthian dukes.

=== Election of bishops of Gurk ===
Under Bishop Roman (1132–1167), the cathedral Chapter obtained the right to elect the bishop. On 11 February 1145, the right of the Chapter to elect the bishop, the provost, and the advocate, was confirmed by Pope Lucius II. Archbishop Conrad (1177–1183) challenged this enactment as contrary to the grant of Pope Alexander II. On 12 April 1179, Pope Alexander III withdrew the privilege which had been granted to Bishop Roman during the schism, and, on 2 February 1180, he ratified the judicial decision of his delegati judices in the dispute between the archbishop and the bishop of Gurk, ruling that the election of a bishop of Gurk belonged entirely to the archbishop of Salzburg.

On 5 June 1208, Pope Innocent III ratified an agreement entered into by the archbishop of Salzburg and the cathedral Chapter of Gurk, allowing the Chapter a role in the selection of a bishop. The archbishop was to nominate three suitable candidates, one from the diocese of Gurk (unum de gremio ipsius ecclesie) and two others from elsewhere. The Chapter was obliged to choose one of the three, who would then be appointed by the archbishop and required to take the customary oaths.

In February 1209, an imperial diet was held at Nuremberg by King Otto IV, in which the relationship between Salzburg and Gurk was adjudicated. On 20 February, the Bishop of Naumberg, on behalf of all the dignitaries assembled, announced that the archbishop of Salzburg should have the right to invest the bishop of Gurk with his regalia. Bishop Walther of Gurk admitted that neither he nor his predecessors had ever received investiture of regalia from kings of the Romans or emperors.

On 9 October 1232, Archbishop Eberhard (1200–1246) and Bishop Ulrich (1221-1253) signed another agreement, in which the archbishop was free to nominate three candidates from anywhere, for the Chapter of Gurk to choose a bishop. After confirmation by the archbishop, the bishop-elect was to swear an oath to the archbishop acknowledging his subservient status (which is quoted), and his ministeriales as well; failure to do so would void the election.

=== Civilian intrusion ===
After a contest of a hundred years the metropolitan regained the right of appointment. Dissensions did not cease, for in 1432 the Habsburg duke Frederick IV of Austria claimed the right of investiture, which even was a subject of the consultations at the Council of Basel under Pope Eugene IV. In February 1446, Pope Eugenius and Frederick signed an agreement in which Frederick was granted the right during his lifetime to nominate bishops to vacancies at Trent, Brixen, Chur, Gurk, Trieste, and Piben. In 1448 King Frederick IV of Germany concluded an agreement with Pope Nicholas V to reserve the right of appointment for himself; and when in 1470 Sixtus of Tannberg was appointed bishop of Gurk by the Chapter of the cathedral of Salzburg, Frederick enforced his resignation four years later.

Finally, on 25 October 1535, the Archbishop of Salzburg and former bishop of Gurk, Matthäus Lang von Wellenburg, concluded a long-lasting agreement with King Ferdinand I of Germany, according to which the nomination of the Bishop of Gurk is to rest twice in succession with the sovereign and every third time with the Archbishop of Salzburg; under all circumstances the archbishop was to retain the right of confirmation, consecration and investiture. From 15 December 1460 onwards the bishops of Gurk held the right to bear the title of a prince-bishop (Furst); the title brought with it no additional secular power.

=== Modern times ===
In 1761 Count Hieronymus von Colloredo was appointed Bishop of Gurk by Archbishop Sigismund von Schrattenbach, whom Colloredo succeeded in 1771. Under Bishop Joseph Franz Auersperg, a dedicated follower of Josephinism, the Gurk diocese received an accession of territory by Emperor Joseph II in 1775, and again in 1786. Nevertheless the present extent of the diocese, embracing the whole of Carinthia, dates only from its reconstitution in 1859. The episcopal residence was transferred in 1787 to the capital of Carinthia, Klagenfurt. A prominent modern prince-bishop was Valentin Wiery (1858–1880).

According to the census of 1906, the Catholic population of the diocese was 369,000, of whom three-fourths were German and the rest Slovenes. The 24 deaneries embraced 345 parishes. The cathedral chapter at Klagenfurt consisted of three mitred dignitaries; five honorary and five stipendiary canons. Among the institutions of religious orders the Benedictine Abbey of St. Paul (founded in 1091; suppressed in 1782; restored in 1807) holds first place. There were also Jesuits at Klagenfurt and St. Andrä; Dominicans at Friesach; Capuchins at Klagenfurt and Wolfsberg; Franciscans at Villach; Olivetans at Tanzenberg; Servites at Kötsehach; Brothers of Mercy at St. Veit on the Glan (in charge of an immense hospital founded in 1877); and a number of religious communities of women for the care of the sick and the instruction of youth.

The clergy used to be trained in the episcopal seminary at Klagenfurt, which, since 1887, was under the direction of the Jesuits; the professors were Benedictines from the Abbey of Saint Paul and Jesuits. Candidates for ordination are now housed in a priestly seminary in Graz, along with others from neighboring dioceses, and attend classes at the University of Graz.

The education of aspirants to the priesthood was provided for at Klagenfurt, in a preparatory seminary established by Bishop Wiery in 1860 and enlarged by Bishop Kahn. At Saint Paul's the Benedictines conducted a private gymnasium with the privileges of a government school. At Klagenfurt there was also a Catholic teachers' seminary under ecclesiastical supervision.

== Churches ==
Chief among the examples of ecclesiastical architecture, both in point of age and artistic interest, is Gurk Cathedral, dedicated to the Assumption of the body of the Virgin Mary into heaven, which dates back to the early days of the diocese, having been completed about 1220. The Klagenfurt Cathedral was built in 1591, during the Protestant Reformation; in 1604 it was acquired by the Jesuits, and consecrated in honour of the Apostles Saints Peter and Paul.

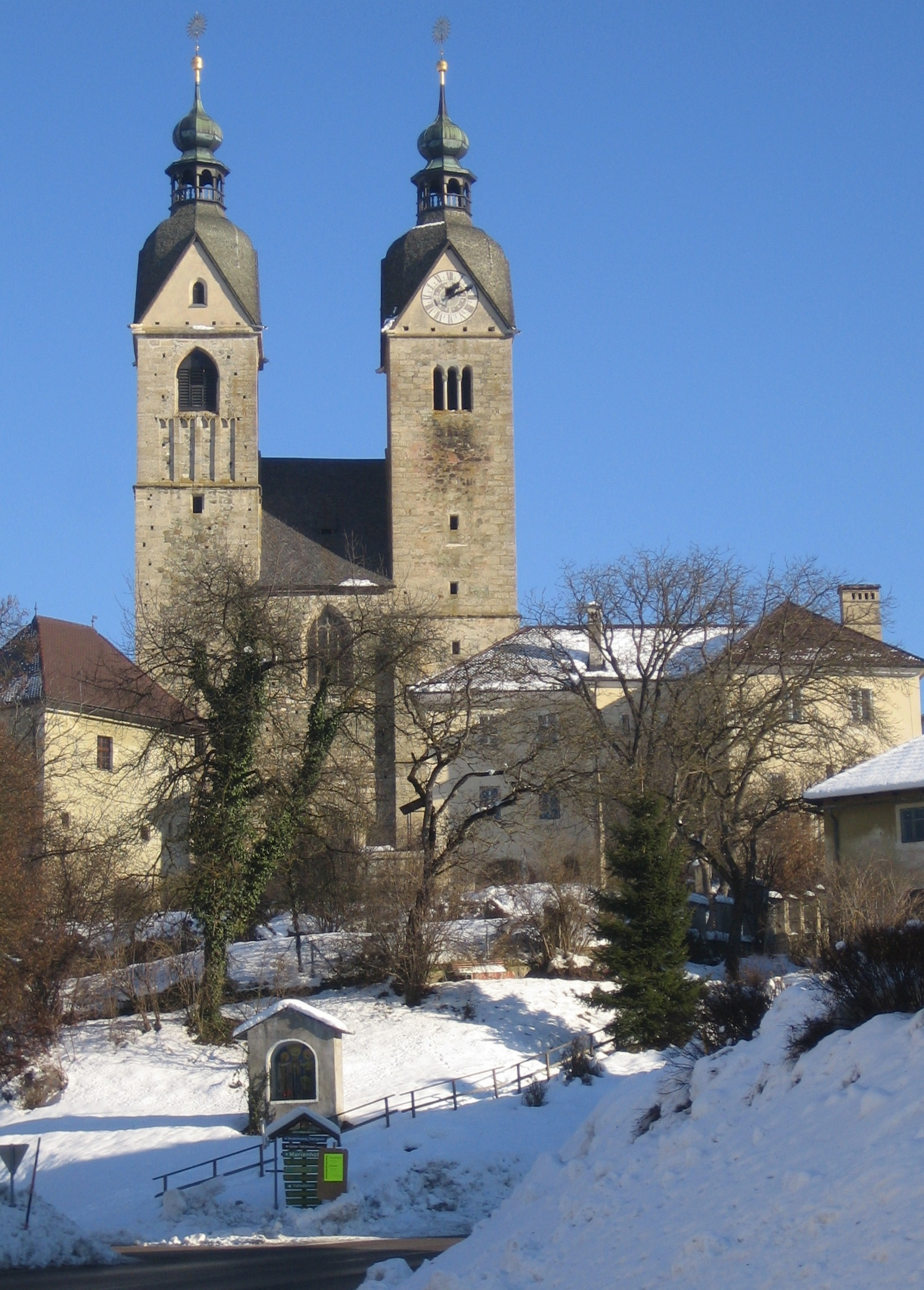
Maria Saal

Other notable landmarks include the Romanesque church and cloister of Millstatt Abbey, alongside key examples of Gothic architecture, such as the parish churches at Bad Sankt Leonhard im Lavanttal, Heiligenblut, Villach, Völkermarkt, St Wolfgang ob Grades (Metnitz), and Waitschach (Hüttenberg). One of the largest and most beautiful churches of Carinthia is the Dominican Church at Friesach.

Prominent among the places of pilgrimage in the diocese is Maria Saal, visited annually by from 15,000 to 20,000 pilgrims.

=== Special churches ===
- Sankt Andrä, Kärnten, formerly the cathedral of the diocese of Lavant (Minor basilica 2014)
- Assumption of Mary pilgrimage church, Mariazell Basilica (Minor basilica 1906)
- Maria Luggau (Our Lady of the Snows), Lesachtal (Minor basilica 1986)

=== Associations ===
Among Catholic associations special mention should be made of those for the advancement of the Catholic Press and for the diffusion of good books: for the German population, the St. Joseph's Verein founded at Klagenfurt in 1893, and the St. Joseph's Book Confraternity. For the Slovenes, the St. Hermagoras Verein was established in 1852 (1860), with its headquarters at Klagenfurt, and widely established among Slovenes in other dioceses.

== Deaneries ==
- Bleiburg (Pliberk)
- Eberndorf (Dobrla vas)
- Feldkirchen
- Ferlach (Borovlje)
- Friesach
- Gmünd-Millstatt
- Greifenburg
- Gurk
- Hermagor (Šmohor)
- Klagenfurt-Stadt
- Klagenfurt-Land (Celovec-dežela)
- Kötschach
- Krappfeld
- Obervellach
- Rosegg (Rožek)
- Sankt Andrä
- Sankt Veit an der Glan
- Spittal an der Drau
- Tainach (Tinje)
- Villach-Land (Beljak-dežela)
- Villach-Stadt
- Völkermarkt (Velikovec)
- Wolfsberg

== Notable bishops ==
- Sixtus of Tannberg (1470–1474) bishop-elect
- Raymond Peraudi (1491–1505)
- Cardinal Matthäus Lang von Wellenburg (1505–1522)
- Hieronymus Balbus (1523–1526)
- Sigismund Francis, Archduke of Austria (1653–1665)
- Archbishop Count Hieronymus von Colloredo (1761–1772)
- Cardinal Joseph Franz Auersperg (1772–1783)
- Valentin Wiery (1858–1880)

== See also ==
- Bishops of Gurk
- Roman Catholicism in Austria

== Sources ==
- Ankershofen, Gottlieb Freiherr von (1848). "Urkunden - Regesten zur Geschichte Kärnthens," in: Archiv für Kunde österreichischer Geschichtsquellen, Vol. 1, Heft III (Wien: K. u. k. Hof- und Staatsdruckerei 1848), pp. 1-39. II. Heft, pp. 309-359.
- Ankershofen, Gottlieb Freiherr von (1849). Urkunden-Regesten zur Geschichte Kärntens (Fortsetzung).. (in German and Latin). Wien: K. u. k. Hof- und Staatsdruckerei 1849 [Akademie der Wissenschaften herausgegebenen Archivs für Kunde österreichischer Geschichtsquellen, vol. 2].
- Brackmann, Albertus (ed.) (1911). Germania pontificia, Vol. 1, Pars I: Provincia Salisburgensis et episcopatus Tridentinus. (in Latin). Berlin: Weidmann 1911.
- Hirn, Josef (1872). Kirchen- und reichsrechtliche Verhältnisse des salzburgischen Suffraganbisthums Gurk. Krems: Pammer, 1872.
- Jaksch von Wartenhorst, August; Wiessner, Hermann (1896). Monumenta historica Ducatus Carinthiae: Geschichtliche Denkmäler des Herzogthumes Kärnten, Volume 1: Die Gurker Geschichtsquellen, 864–1232. (in German and Latin). Klagenfurt: Commissionsverlag von F. v. Kleinmayr, 1896. Bd. 2: Die Gurker Geschichtsquellen (Schluss) 1233-1269 Klagenfurt: Kleinmayr, 1898.
- Schroll, Beda (1885), "Series episcoporum et s.r.i. principum Gurkensium," (in German), in: Archiv für Vaterländische Geschichte und Topographie, Volume 15 (Klagenfurt 1885), pp. 3-43.

=== External links ===
- Gabriel Chow, GCatholic.org, Diocese of Gurk ^{[self-published]}
- David M. Cheney, Catholic-hierarchy.org, Diocese of Gurk ^{[self-published]}
- Diocese website
- Lauchert, Friedrich. "Diocese of Gurk." The Catholic Encyclopedia. Vol. 7. New York 1910, pp. 88-89.
