= John III of the Palatinate =

48th Archbishop of Regensburg

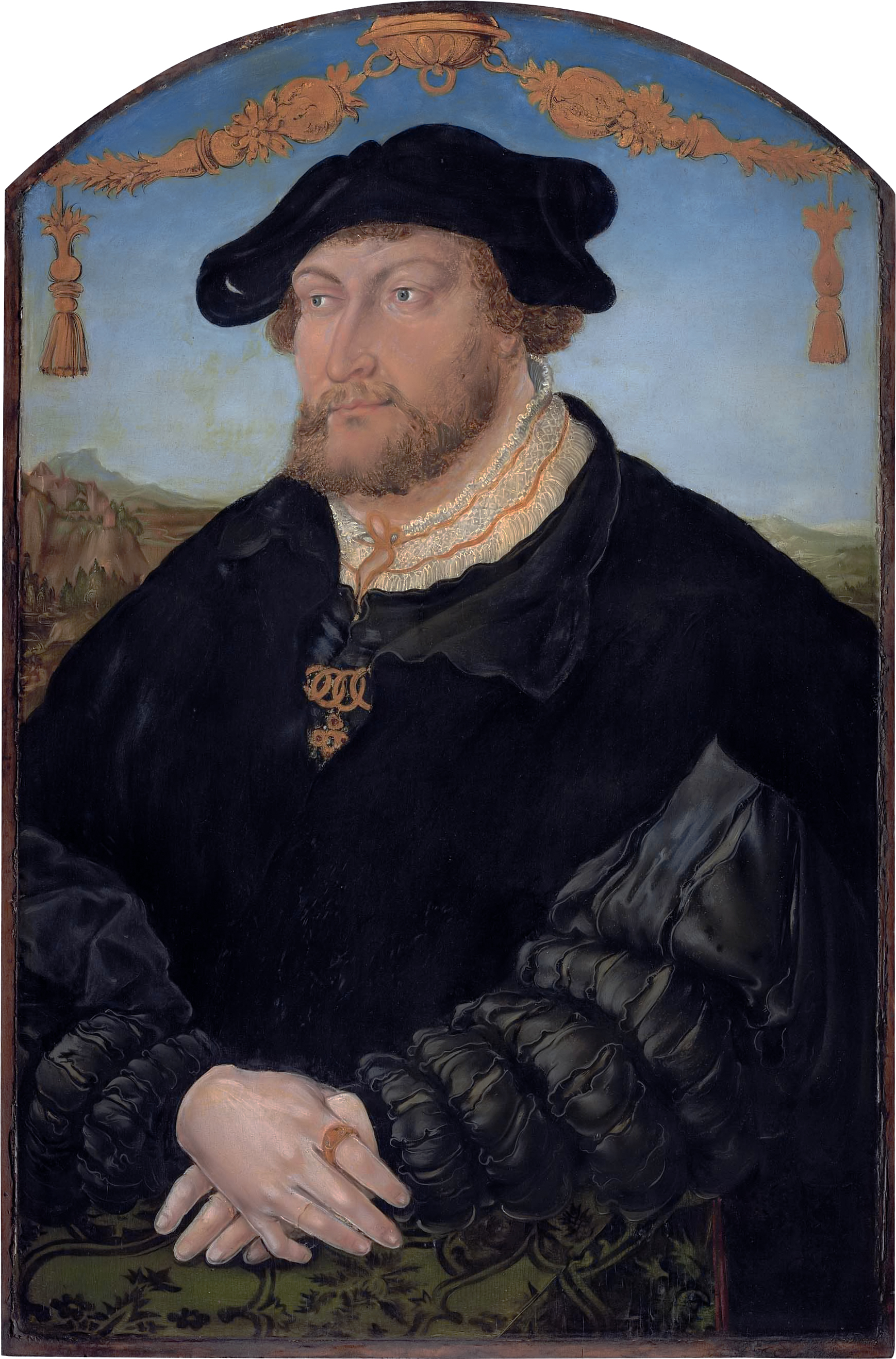
- Johann III of the Palatinate (1488-1538) (Studio of Hans Wertinger, 1526)
- Born: 7 May 1488; Heidelberg
- Died: 3 February 1538 (aged 49)
- Noble family: House of Wittelsbach
- Father: Philip, Elector Palatine
- Mother: Margaret of Bavaria

John III of the Palatinate (7 May 1488 in Heidelberg – 3 February 1538) was the 48th Archbishop of Regensburg. He reigned from 1507 until his death.

== Background ==
John III of the Palatine was a member of the House of Wittelsbach. His father was Elector Palatine Philip; his mother was Margaret of Bavaria. His brothers included George, who was Bishop of Speyer and Henry, who was bishop of Utrecht, Freising and Worms.

== Reign ==
As a younger son, John III was destined from a young age for a career in the clergy. Nevertheless, he received little education on religious matters. He proved a capable administrator, but never took religious vows, so technically he was diocesan administrator rather than archbishop.

There were riots in Regensburg between 1511 and 1513. These were triggered by the deaths of Sigmund von Rohrbach. He had been imperial captain; this office was increasingly used as a favour for favorites of the emperor. This meant the imperial captains were frequently absent, and decision they had to take were delayed. Emperor Maximilian I awarded the office to the knight Thomas Fuchs von Schneeburg. The riots led to the creation of a council from the ranks of the city's leading citizens. This council announce that they would investigate the problem. However, some members intended to take revenge on the emperor's appointees. After mediation by John III, a more conservative City Council was installed, who managed to halt the revolution. An imperial commission then punished the leaders of the unrest.

John III supported the agitation against the Jews in Regensburg, which was popular among the middle classes. There were anti-Jewish sermons and the bishop's law court began to interpret court cases about unpaid loans as religious disputes between Christians and Jews. The Jews sent letters of complaint to Emperor Maximilian I, who rebuked John III. After Maximilian I died in 1519, the city turned against the Jews. Their synagogue was demolished and they were forced to leave the city. A church, dedicated to Maria, was constructed on the spot where the synagogue had stood. Balthasar Hubmaier was a preacher in this church. Pilgrims began to visit this church, and John III began to administered the considerable revenue the pilgrims brought in.

While the city and clergy agreed on the persecution of the Jews, they disagreed on other matters. In particular, John III claimed all taxes paid by the clergy, and challenged the city and the sovereign princes in his diocese, who also claimed these revenues. Among the more important events during the Reformation was the conversion of Balthaser Hubmaier to Anabaptism. Hubmaier would later be tortured and burned at the stake in Vienna. The diocese lost he deanery of Wunsiedel when the local ruler, Margrave George the Pious indulged in a church visitation. He summoned the clergy in his territory and judged them by their loyalty to himself and their attitude towards the Lutheran faith, of which he was an early champion. He imprisoned clergy he didn't like, and deprived them of their income. The fate of the Dean Melchior von Sparneck is a typical example of what might happen to a priest in these restless times.

Three years before his death, John III negotiated with his brothers Louis V and Frederick II and with the cathedral chapter. He wanted to retire, and wanted the separate several districts from the bishopric to provide him with an income during his retirement, and he wanted the chapter to elect one of his underage relatives as his successor. The chapter refused, as they were afraid that the lands he would separate from the bishopric would be inherited by the Elector Palatine after his death.

John III died on 3 February 1538. After his death, he left a debt of 30000 guilders.

John III of the Palatinate House of Wittelsbach Born: 7 May 1488 Died: 3 February 1538
Preceded by Rupert II	Administrator of Regensburg; 1507–1538	Succeeded by Pankraz von Sinzenhofen
