= Catherine of the Palatinate (1499–1526) =

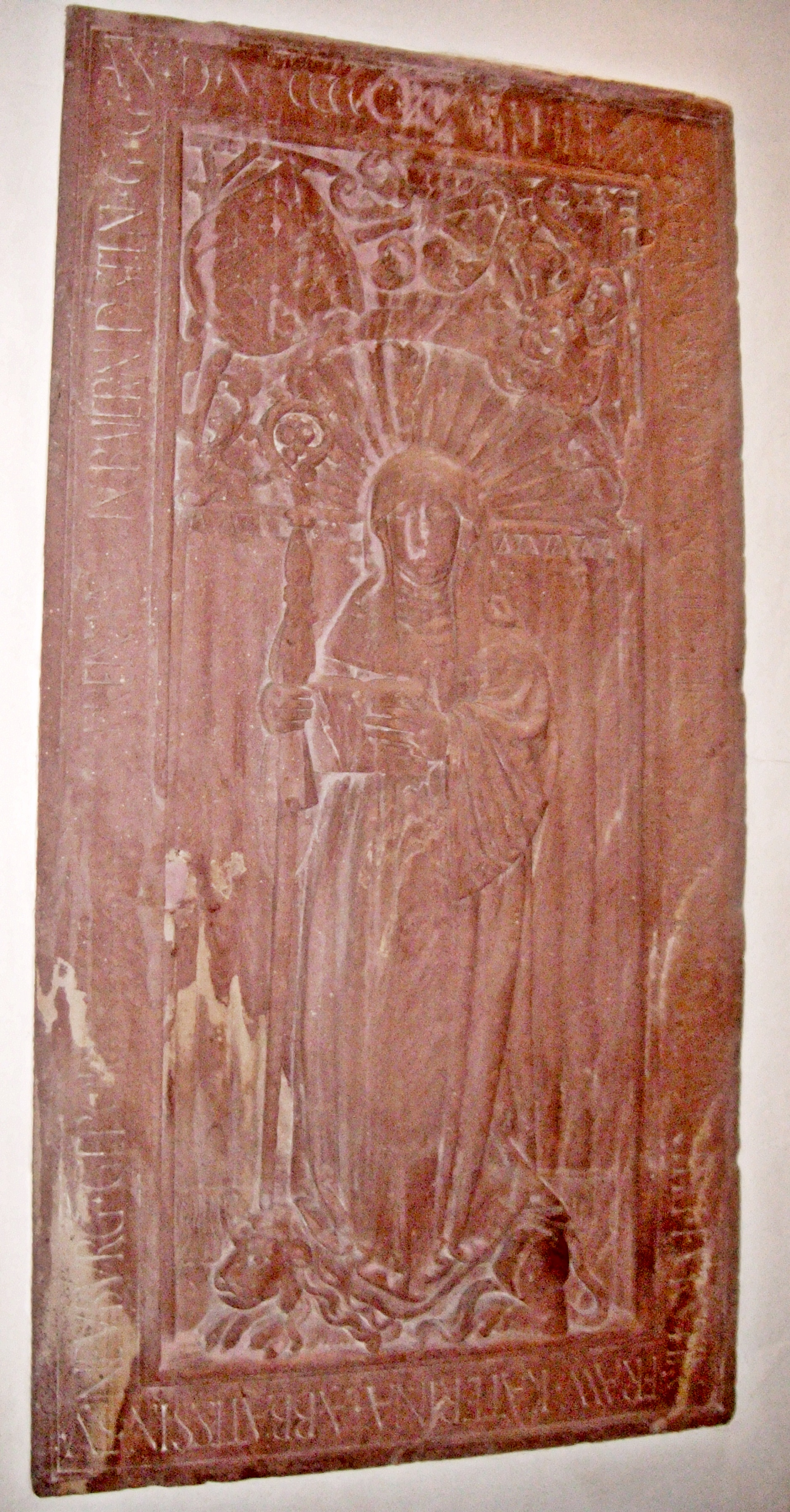
- Contemporary tombstone in the Klosterkirche Neuburg
- Born: 14 October 1499; Heidelberg
- Died: 16 January 1526 (aged 26); Neuburg Abbey
- Buried: Abbey church of Neuburg Abbey.
- Noble family: Wittelsbach
- Father: Philip, Elector Palatine
- Mother: Margaret of Bavaria-Landshut

Catherine of the Palatinate (14 October 1499 in Heidelberg – 16 January 1526 in Neuburg Abbey) was a member of the Wittelsbach family and a titular Countess Palatine of Simmern. She was abbess of Neuburg Abbey.

== Life ==
Catherine was the youngest child of Elector Palatine Philip (1448–1508) from his marriage to Margaret (1456–1501), the daughter of Duke Louis IX of Bavaria-Landshut. In 1515, Catherine renounced her inheritance and entered the Benedictine Neuburg Abbey. She became abbess of the abbey.

Catherine died in 1526, at the age of 26. She was buried in the abbey church of Neuburg. Her grave stone can be found on the north wall of the nave, opposite the monastery portal. It is made of red sandstone and it shows, in bas-relief, Catherine wearing a nun's habit, with the abbess's staff and a book in her hands and a lion at her feet.
