= Louis V, Elector Palatine =

Elector Palatine from 1508 to 1544

Louis V
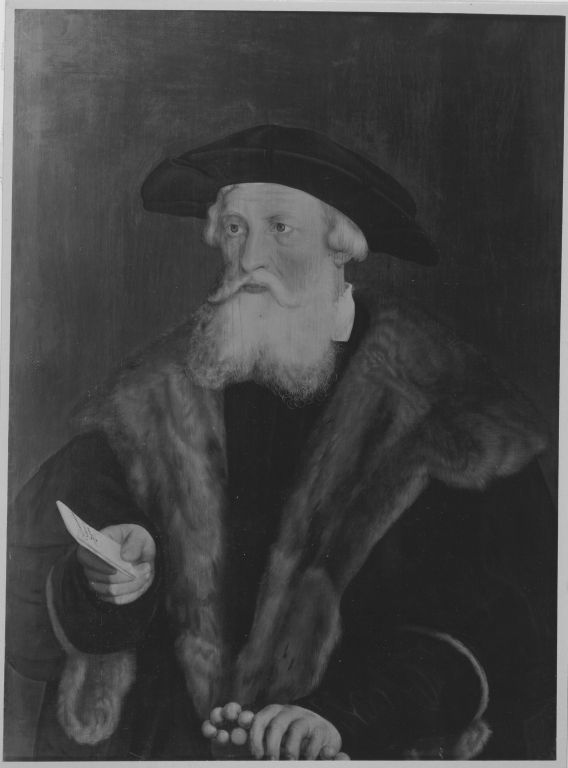

Elector Palatine
- Reign: 28 February 1508 – 16 March 1544
- Predecessor: Philip
- Successor: Frederick II
- Born: 2 July 1478; Heidelberg
- Died: 16 March 1544 (aged 65); Heidelberg
- Spouse: Sibylle of Bavaria (m. 1511; died 1519)
- House: House of Wittelsbach
- Father: Philip, Elector Palatine
- Mother: Margaret of Bavaria
- Religion: Lutheran (from 1530s); Roman Catholic (until 1530s)

Louis V, Count Palatine of the Rhine (German: Ludwig V. von der Pfalz) (2 July 1478, in Heidelberg – 16 March 1544, in Heidelberg), also Louis the Pacific, was a member of the Wittelsbach dynasty. He was prince elector of the Palatinate. His parents were Philip, Elector Palatine, and Margaret, a daughter of Louis IX, Duke of Bavaria-Landshut.

He converted to Lutheranism in the 1530s.

== Biography ==
Louis was born 2 July 1478.

Louis succeeded his father in 1508 and had to cope with the consequences of the lost Landshut War of Succession against Albert IV, Duke of Bavaria. With the Imperial Diet of Augsburg in 1518 Louis achieved the annulment of the Imperial Ban against the Palatinate. In 1519 Louis voted for Charles V, Holy Roman Emperor.

During the German Peasants' War, Louis found himself surrounded by 8,000 armed peasants in Neustadt, where he invited their leaders to dinner and complied with their demands.

Louis married Sibylle, daughter of Albert IV, Duke of Bavaria but had no children by her. He died 16 March 1544. He was succeeded by his brother Frederick.

== Ancestors ==
Ancestors of Louis V, Elector Palatine

16. Rupert of Germany
8. Louis III, Elector Palatine
17. Elisabeth of Nuremberg
4. Louis IV, Elector Palatine
18. Amadeo, Prince of Achaea
9. Matilda of Savoy
19. Catherine of Geneva
2. Philip, Elector Palatine
20. Amadeus VII, Count of Savoy
10. Amadeus VIII of Savoy
21. Bonne of Berry
5. Margaret of Savoy
22. Philip the Bold
11. Mary of Burgundy
23. Margaret III, Countess of Flanders
1. Louis V, Elector Palatine
24. Frederick, Duke of Bavaria
12. Henry XVI, Duke of Bavaria
25. Maddalena Visconti
6. Louis IX, Duke of Bavaria
26. Albert IV of Austria
13. Margaret of Austria
27. Johanna Sophia of Bavaria
3. Margaret of Bavaria
28. Frederick I, Elector of Saxony
14. Frederick II, Elector of Saxony
29. Catherine of Brunswick-Lüneburg
7. Amalia of Saxony
30. Ernest, Duke of Austria
15. Margaret of Austria
31. Cymburgis of Masovia

Louis V, Elector Palatine House of Wittelsbach Born: 1478 Died: 1544
German royalty
Regnal titles
Preceded by Philip	Elector Palatine; 1508–1544	Succeeded by Frederick II
