= Bishopric of Naumburg-Zeitz =

Lost diocese of the Roman Catholic Church

Prince-Bishopric of Naumburg-Zeitz Bistum Naumburg-Zeitz (German)
- 968–1615
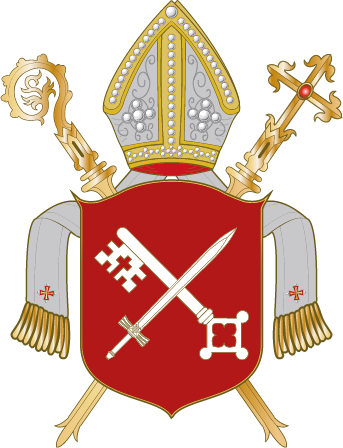
- Coat of arms

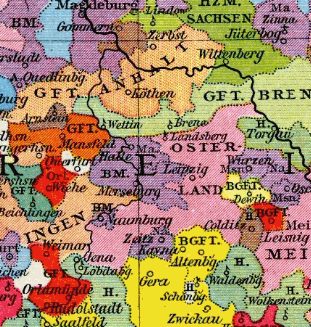
- The Prince-Bishopric of Naumburg around 1250
- Status: Prince-Bishopric of the Holy Roman Empire
- Capital: Zeitz Cathedral; (968–1029); Naumburg Cathedral; (1029–1615)
- Religion: State Secular Bishops Roman Catholicism (968–1542) (1547–1564) Lutheranism (1542–1547) Protestantism (1514–1615)
- Government: Ecclesiastical principality
- Bishop of Naumburg
- Historical era: Middle Ages, Early Modern Period
  - Established: January 2, 968
  - Disestablished: 1615
Succeeded by
Electorate of Saxony
- Today part of: Germany

The Prince-Bishopric of Naumburg-Zeitz (German: Bistum Naumburg-Zeitz; Latin: Citizensis, then Naumburgensis or Nuemburgensis) was a medieval diocese in the central German area between Leipzig in the east and Erfurt in the west. The seat of the bishop was Zeitz Cathedral in Zeitz from 968 and 1029 and Naumburg Cathedral in Naumburg between 1029 and 1615. It was dissolved in the wake of the Reformation. The Bishopric of Zeitz-Naumburg encompassed the four archdeaconries of Naumburg, Zeitz, Altenburg and "trans Muldam" (comprising the sub-districts (Unterbezirke) of Lichtenstein, Glauchau, Hartenstein and Lößnitz).

== History ==
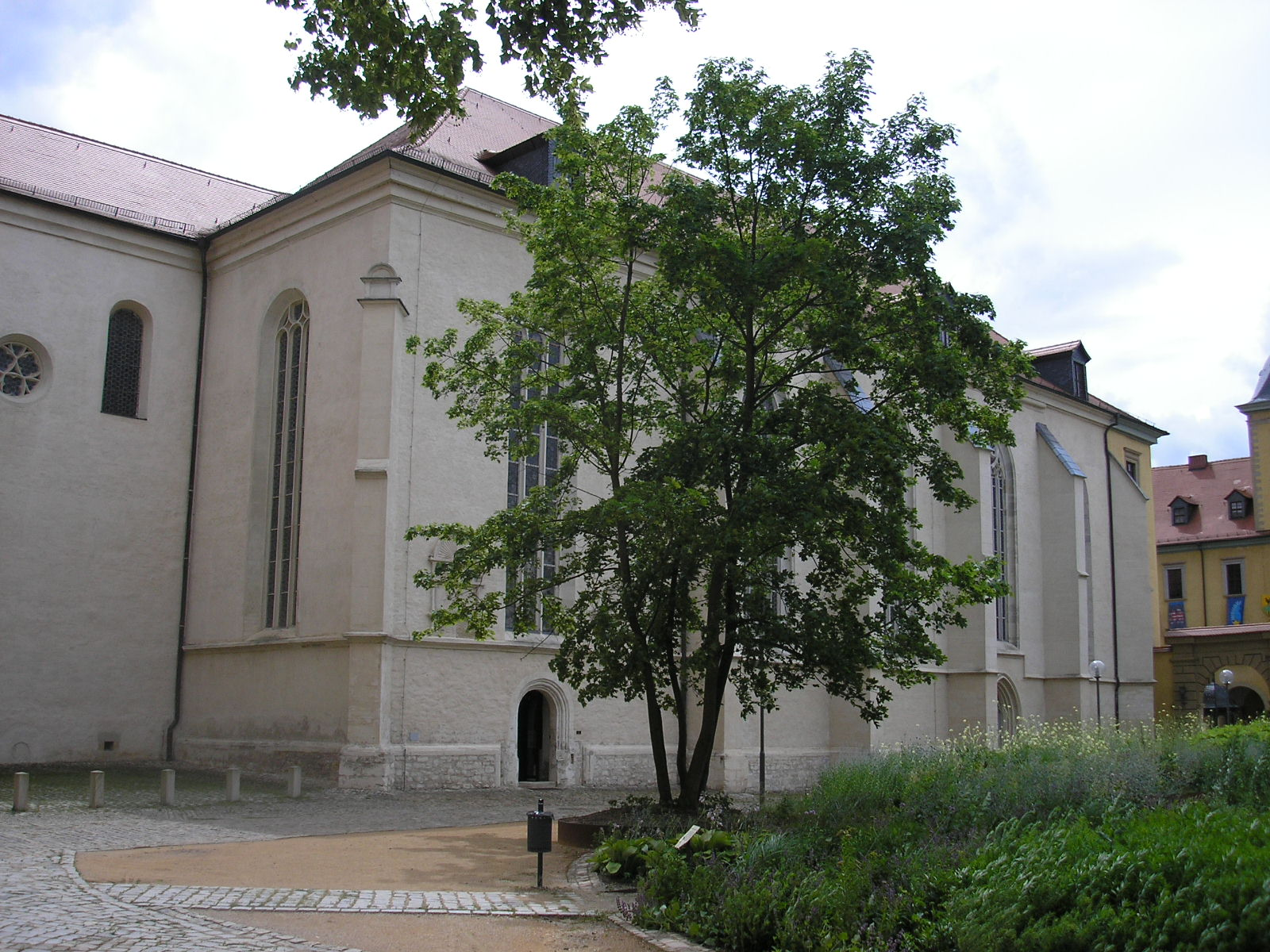
Zeitz Cathedral

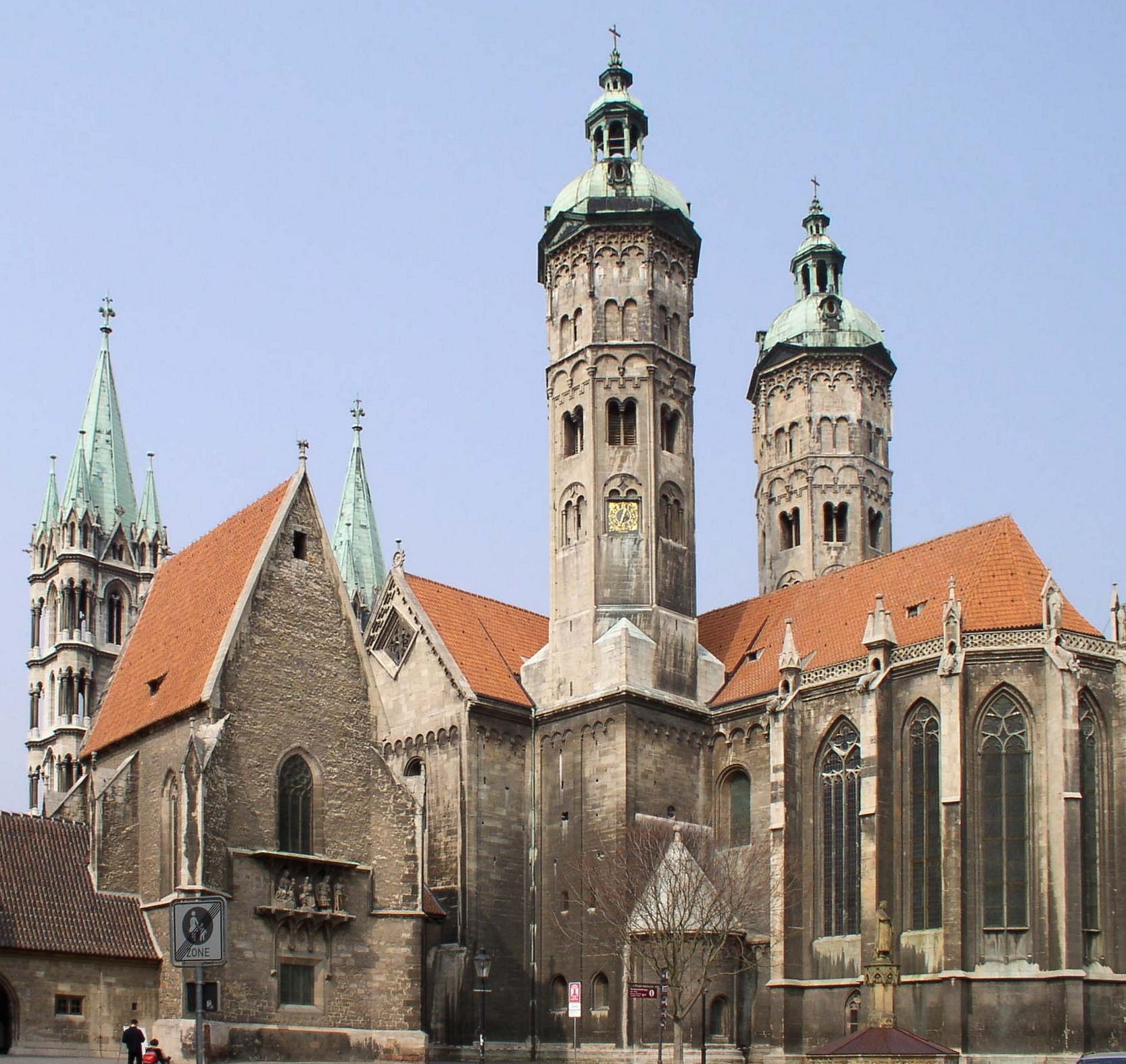
Naumburg Cathedral

The diocese of Zeitz was founded on January 2, AD 968. Along with Meißen and Merseburg, it had been authorized by Pope John XIII at the Synod of Ravenna the year before, in accordance with a recommendation by Emperor Otto I. All three bishoprics were suffragans of the Archbishopric of Magdeburg.

== List ==
=== Bishops of Zeitz ===
- Hugh I (968–979)
- Frederick (979–990)
- Hugh II (991–1002)
- Hildeward (1003–1030)

=== Bishops of Naumburg ===
- Kadeloh (1030–1045)
- Eberhard (1045–1079)
- Günther I (1079–1090)
- Walram (1091–1111), who corresponded with St Anselm
- Dietrich I (1111–1123)
- Richwin (1123–1125)
- Udo I (1125–1148)
- Wichmann von Seeburg (1148–1154)
- Berthold I (1154–1161)
- Udo II (1161–1186)
- Berthold II (1186–1206)
- Engelhard (1206 – 4 April 1242)
- Dietrich II (1243–1272)
- Meinher von Neuenburg (1272–1280)
- Ludolf von Mihla (1280–1285)
- Bruno von Langenbogen (1285–1304)
- Ulrich I (1304–1315)
- Henry I (1316–1335)
- Withego I (1335–1348)
- John I (1348–1351)
- Rudolf von Nebra (1352–1359)

John of Neumarkt was bishop-elect in opposition to Rudolf in 1352–1353.

- Gerhard von Schwarzburg (13 May 1359 - 6 October 1372, translated to Würzburg)
- Withego II (6 October 1372 – 1382)
- Christian von Witzleben (1382 – 23 October 1394)
- Ulrich II (1394–1409)
- Gerhard II (1409–1422)
- John II (1422–1434)
- Peter von Schleinitz (6 September 1434 – 1 October 1463)
- Georg von Haugwitz (1463)
- Dietrich III (25 May 1464 – 9 March 1466)
- Henry II (2 June 1466 - 24 March 1480)
- Dietrich IV (27 June 1481 – 15 March 1492)
- John III (15 March 1492 – 26 September 1517)
- Philipp von der Pfalz (1517–1541)
- Nicolaus von Amsdorf (1542–1546), Lutheran bishop
- Julius von Pflug (6 November 1542 – 3 September 1564), the last Catholic bishop of the diocese

=== Auxiliary bishops ===
- Heinrich Kratz (appointed 1484)

== See also ==
- Electorate of Saxony
