= Frederick II, Elector Palatine =

Elector Palatine from 1544 to 1556

Frederick II
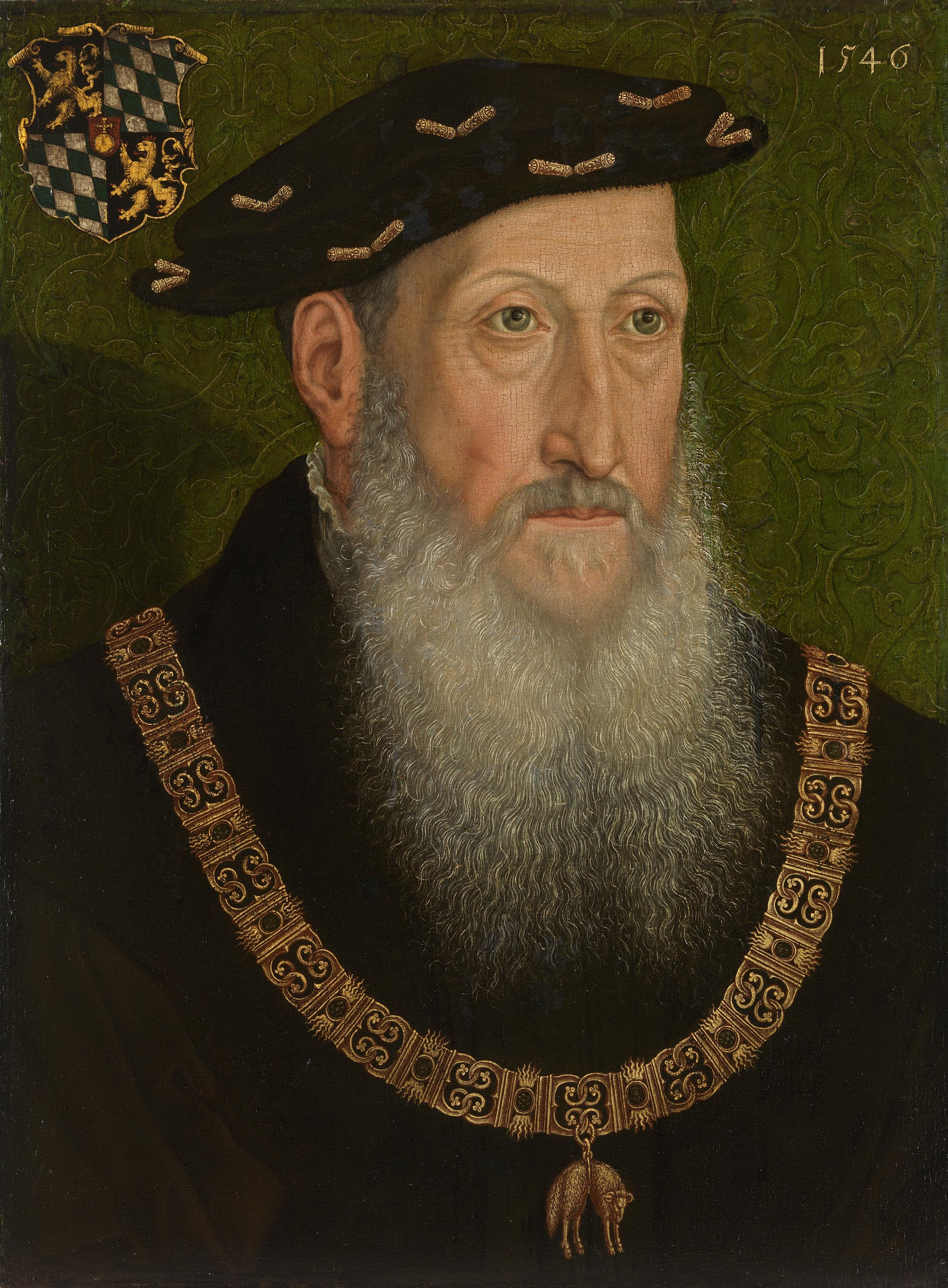

Elector Palatine
- Reign: 16 March 1544 – 26 February 1556
- Predecessor: Louis V
- Successor: Otto Henry
- Born: 9 December 1482; Winzingen Castle near Neustadt an der Weinstraße
- Died: 26 February 1556 (aged 73); Alzey
- Spouse: Dorothea of Denmark (m. 1535)
- House: Wittelsbach
- Father: Philip, Elector Palatine
- Mother: Margarete of Bavaria-Landshut
- Religion: Lutheran (from 1540s); Catholic (until 1540s)

Frederick II, Count Palatine of the Rhine (9 December 1482 – 26 February 1556), also Frederick the Wise, a member of the Wittelsbach dynasty, was Prince-elector of the Palatinate from 1544 to 1556, and pretender to the Norwegian Throne from 1535 to 1556.

The Kurfürst-Friedrich-Gymnasium in Heidelberg is named after him.

== Early life ==
Frederick was born at Winzingen Castle near Neustadt an der Weinstraße as the fourth son of Philip, Elector Palatine and his wife, Margarete of Bavaria-Landshut. He was the Count Palatine and served as counselor and general for Charles V, Holy Roman Emperor, commanding expeditions against the Turks in 1529 and 1532, and assisting the Emperor at the Diet of Augsburg in 1530. In 1517, he had declared his love suit to the Habsburg Princess Eleanor of Austria, but this was discovered by her brother Charles V, then duke of Burgundy and king of Spain, resulting in Count Frederick being temporarily banished from court until he returned after announcing to Charles his Imperial election in 1519. In 1535, he married in Heidelberg to Dorothea of Denmark, Eleanor's niece.

He was custodian of the young dukes of Palatinate-Neuburg Otto Henry and Philip and then served as general for the Habsburg Ferdinand I.

== Pretender to the Norwegian throne ==
Frederick was for a time involved in coup plans in Denmark-Norway. His wife Dorothea was eldest daughter of Christian II of Denmark, the former King of Denmark, Norway and Sweden who was deposed after a Danish noble rebellion in 1523. The exiled Christian II was contacted by Olav Engelbrektsson, Catholic Archbishop of Norway and head of the Council of the Realm, in 1529, about retaking the throne of Norway from the Protestant friendly King Frederick I. Christian II was a Protestant, but was also the brother-in-law of Emperor Charles V and therefore vowed to help the Catholic cause in Norway. Christian II tried to retake Norway in 1531, but he was defeated in 1532. He was then imprisoned and was kept a prisoner for the next 27 years in Denmark.

After Frederick's marriage to Dorothea in 1535, Frederick soon sent a letter to Olav Engelbrektsson (via emissaries in Brussels) telling him that he would claim the throne and he also promised military support from himself and Charles V. In the winter of 1536, Olav Engelbrektsson sent squads of supporters to villages in Eastern Norway; among other things the squads read the letter out to people, signalling that a new ruler could be on his way. However, few peasants joined the would-be rebellion, but other sources say that many farmers and bourgeoisie in Eastern Norway rose up in rebellion for the Archbishop, but it soon failed as no actual support from Frederick or Charles came. In the winter of 1537, then, Frederick did send two ships from the Habsburg Netherlands. However, this was to no avail as the King of Denmark mounted a naval offensive to secure Norway around the same time. Olav Engelbrektsson fled the country in April, bishops Hoskuld Hoskuldsson and Mogens Lauritssøn were arrested, in June, other supporters were punished and the Catholic Church in Norway and the Council of the Realm were abolished.

Frederick and his wife Dorothea never gave up on his claim to the throne of Norway (and also Denmark), and worked actively to have the Emperor Charles V to support it. In 1539, they visited the Emperor in Spain to press the matter, but without success. In 1544, Frederick became Elector Palatine. The Emperor officially acknowledged Christian III as king of Denmark and Norway the same year, in the Treaty of Speyer, but Frederick continued to press his claim until his death.

== Prince-elector of the Electoral Palatinate ==
In March 1544, Frederick succeeded his brother Louis V as Prince-elector of the Palatinate. At Christmas of 1546 Frederick and his wife Dorothea took communion in the Protestant way in Heidelberg, which provoked Emperor Charles V's displeasure. For a while, Frederick took the side of the Protestant opposition. However, he soon rejoined the Emperor's Catholic cause. After this, Frederick prevented the introduction of Protestant Reformation in the Palatinate. Frederick II died in February 1556 in Alzey, and was succeeded by his former ward Otto Henry.

== Ancestors ==
Ancestors of Frederick II, Elector Palatine

16. Rupert of Germany
8. Louis III, Elector Palatine
17. Elisabeth of Nuremberg
4. Louis IV, Elector Palatine
18. Amadeo, Prince of Achaea
9. Matilda of Savoy
19. Catherine of Geneva
2. Philip, Elector Palatine
20. Amadeus VII, Count of Savoy
10. Antipope Felix V
21. Bonne of Berry
5. Margaret of Savoy, Duchess of Anjou
22. Philip the Bold
11. Mary of Burgundy, Duchess of Savoy
23. Margaret III, Countess of Flanders
1. Frederick II, Elector Palatine
24. Frederick, Duke of Bavaria
12. Henry XVI, Duke of Bavaria
25. Maddalena Visconti
6. Louis IX, Duke of Bavaria
26. Albert IV of Austria
13. Margaret of Austria
27. Johanna Sophia of Bavaria
3. Margaret of Bavaria, Electress Palatine
28. Frederick I, Elector of Saxony
14. Frederick II, Elector of Saxony
29. Catherine of Brunswick-Lüneburg
7. Amalia of Saxony, Duchess of Bavaria
30. Ernest, Duke of Austria
15. Margaret of Austria
31. Cymburgis of Masovia

Frederick II, Elector Palatine House of Wittelsbach Born: 9 December 1482 Died: 26 February 1556
German royalty
Regnal titles
Preceded by Louis V	Elector Palatine; 1544–1556	Succeeded by Otto Henry
