= Helen of the Palatinate =

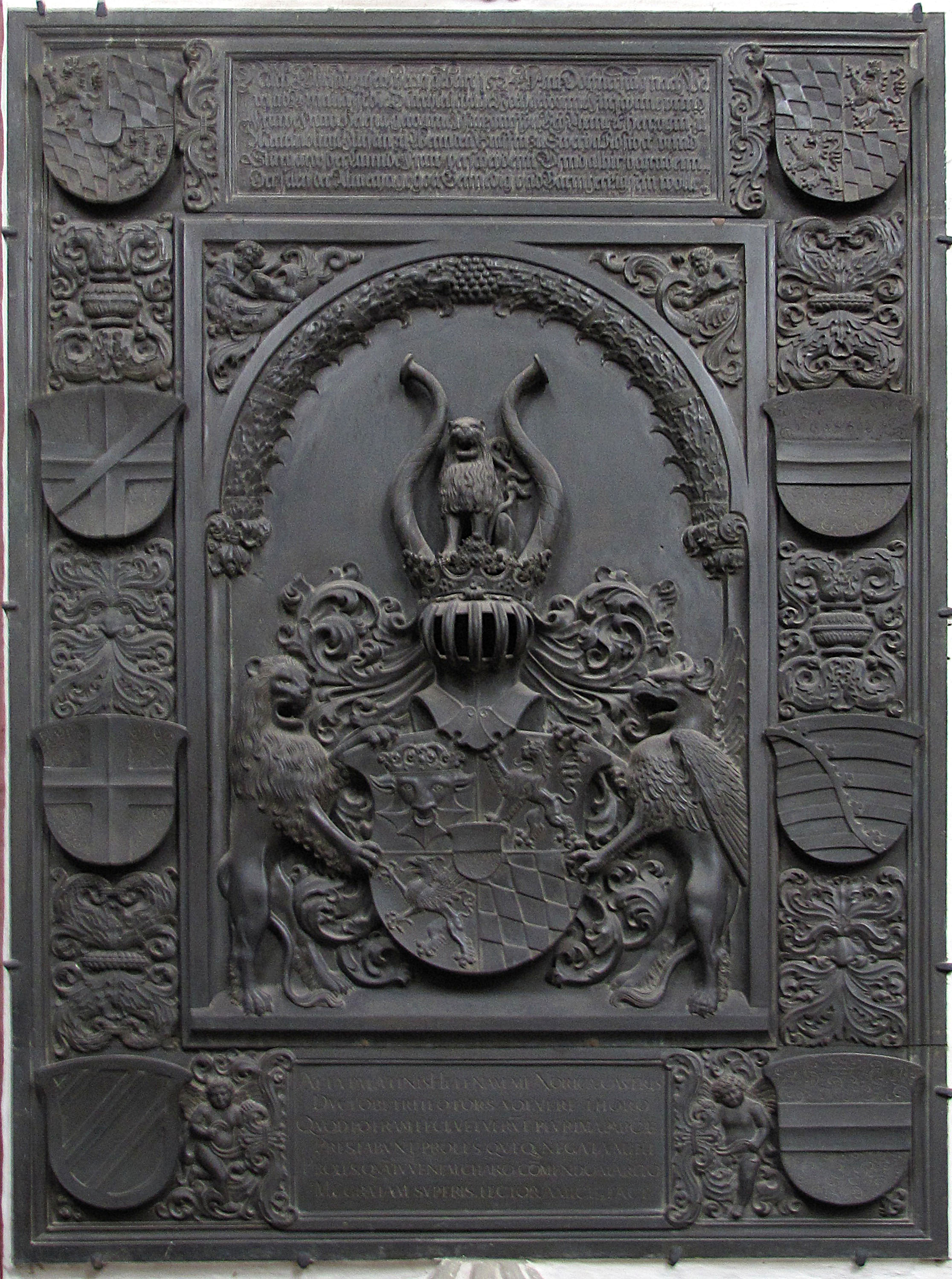
- Epitaph in the cathedral of Schwerin
- Born: 9 February 1493; Heidelberg
- Died: 4 August 1524 (aged 31); Schwerin
- Noble family: House of Wittelsbach
- Spouse: Henry V, Duke of Mecklenburg
- Father: Philip, Elector Palatine
- Mother: Margaret of Bavaria

Helen of the Palatinate (9 February 1493, Heidelberg – 4 August 1524, Schwerin) was a member of the Palatinate-Simmern branch of House of Wittelsbach and a Countess Palatine of Simmern by birth and by marriage Duchess of Mecklenburg.

== Life ==
Helen was a daughter of the Elector Palatine Philip (1448–1508) from his marriage to Margaret (1456–1501), daughter of Duke Louis IX of Bavaria-Landshut.

She married on 15 June 1513 in Wismar with Duke Henry V of Mecklenburg (1479–1552). Fineke von Greese had to be told not to wear her best dress, so as not to outshine the bride. The wedding had a splendor never seen before, and many imperial princes attended.

Helene died in 1524 and was buried in Schwerin Cathedral. She was the first member of the ducal family to be buried in Schwerin, until then the dukes and duchesses had been buried in the Doberan Minster. Her epitaph was created by Peter Vischer the Elder. Until 1845, it was attached to the wall behind the altar; today it is located in the south passage, next to the entrance.

== Issue ==
From her marriage, Helen had the following children:

- Philip (1514–1557), Duke of Mecklenburg
- Margaret (1515–1559)

married in 1537 Duke Henry II of Münsterberg Oels (1507-1548)

- Catherine (1518–1581)

married in 1538 Duke Frederick III of Legnica (1520-1570)
