= Philip I of Rosenberg =

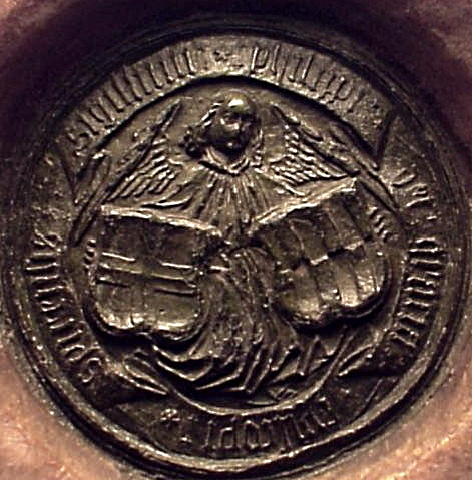
- Seal of Bishop Philip I of Rosenberg; on the left the coat of arms of the Bishopric of Speyer, with a cross; on the right the von Rosenberg family coat of arms
- Born: c. 1460
- Died: 4 February 1513; Udenheim, today's Philippsburg
- Buried: Cloister of Speyer Cathedral
- Noble family: von Rosenberg
- Father: Erasmus of Rosenberg
- Mother: Margaret of Helmstatt

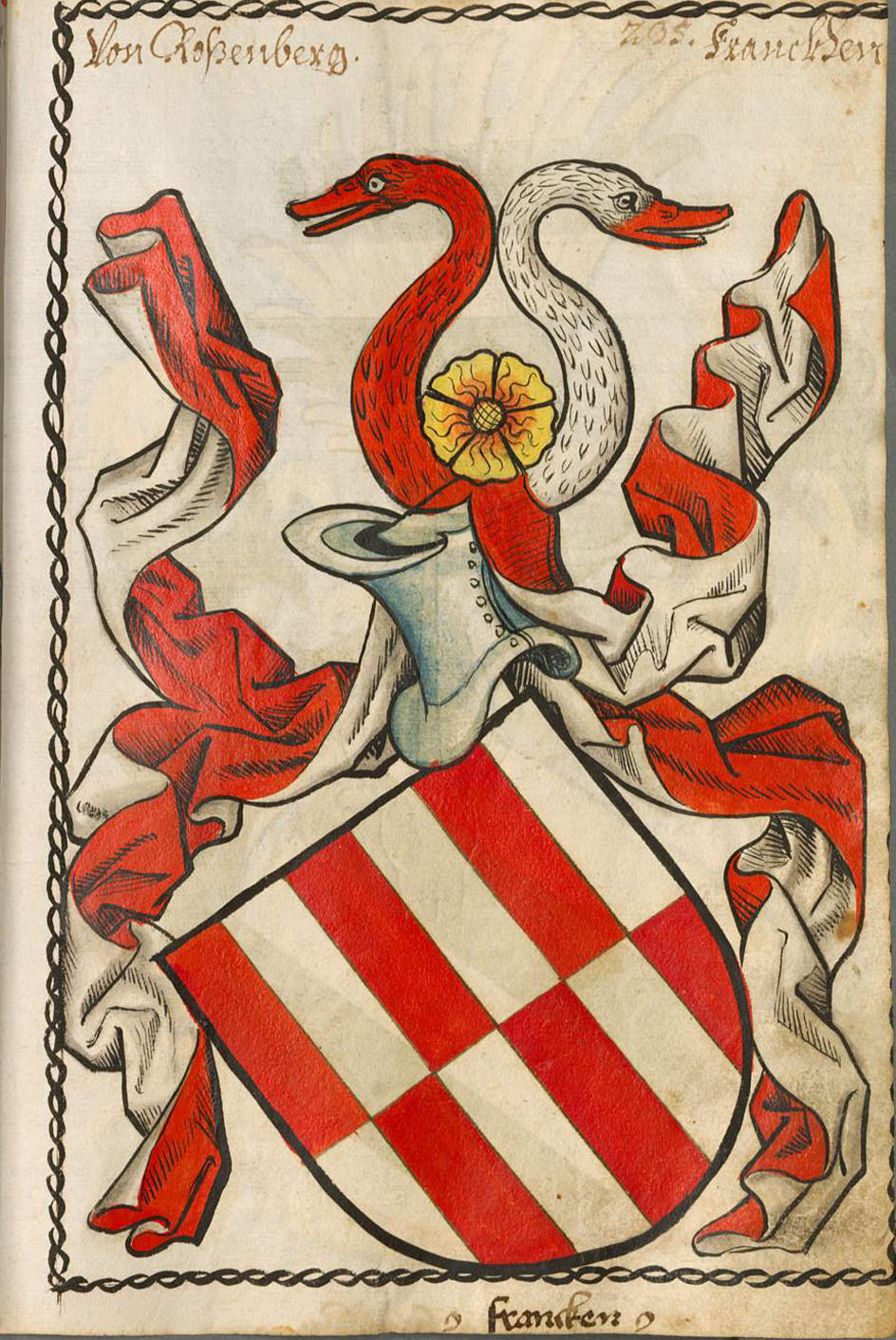
Coat of arms of the von Rosenberg family, according to Scheibler's armorial

Philip I of Rosenberg (c. 1460 – 4 February 1513 in Udenheim, today's Philippsburg) was Prince-Bishop of Speyer from 1504 until his death.

== Youth ==
Philip I of Rosenberg was a member of the Franconian noble von Rosenberg family. His father was Erasmus of Rosenberg. Erasmus was in the service of the Principality of Ansbach as bailiff of Uffenheim. He was the founder of the von Rosenberg line in Uttenhofen.

His mother was Margaret of Helmstatt, a member of the Franconian von Helmstatt family. Both the von Rosenberg family and the von Helmstatt family belonged to the Odenwald canton of the Franconian circle of Imperial Knights.

In 1479, Philip studied in Heidelberg and was canon of Worms. In 1480, he was appointed canon in Speyer. In 1480 and 1481, he continued his studies in Ingolstadt, where he received a doctorate in canon law.

In 1490, his uncle Louis of Helmstatt, who was bishop of Speyer, appointed him Vicar general of Speyer. In 1492, he was appointed Provost of the St. German monastery. In 1495, he became Cantor.

== Bishop of Speyer ==
Bishop Louis of Helmstatt died on 24 August 1504, and already on 6 September of the same year, Philip was elected as his successor. The Pope confirmed his election on 8 November, and he was consecrated on 9 February 1505.

In his retrospective, the 19th century Canon Joseph Sigmund Zimmern described Philip I as "devout, but with a very weak health" and continues "... a learned, but simple and exceedingly frugal man." In the 17 missives of his hand that survived, he combats misconduct by the clergy and by lay people. He had the diocesan agenda printed by Peter Drach in Speyer.

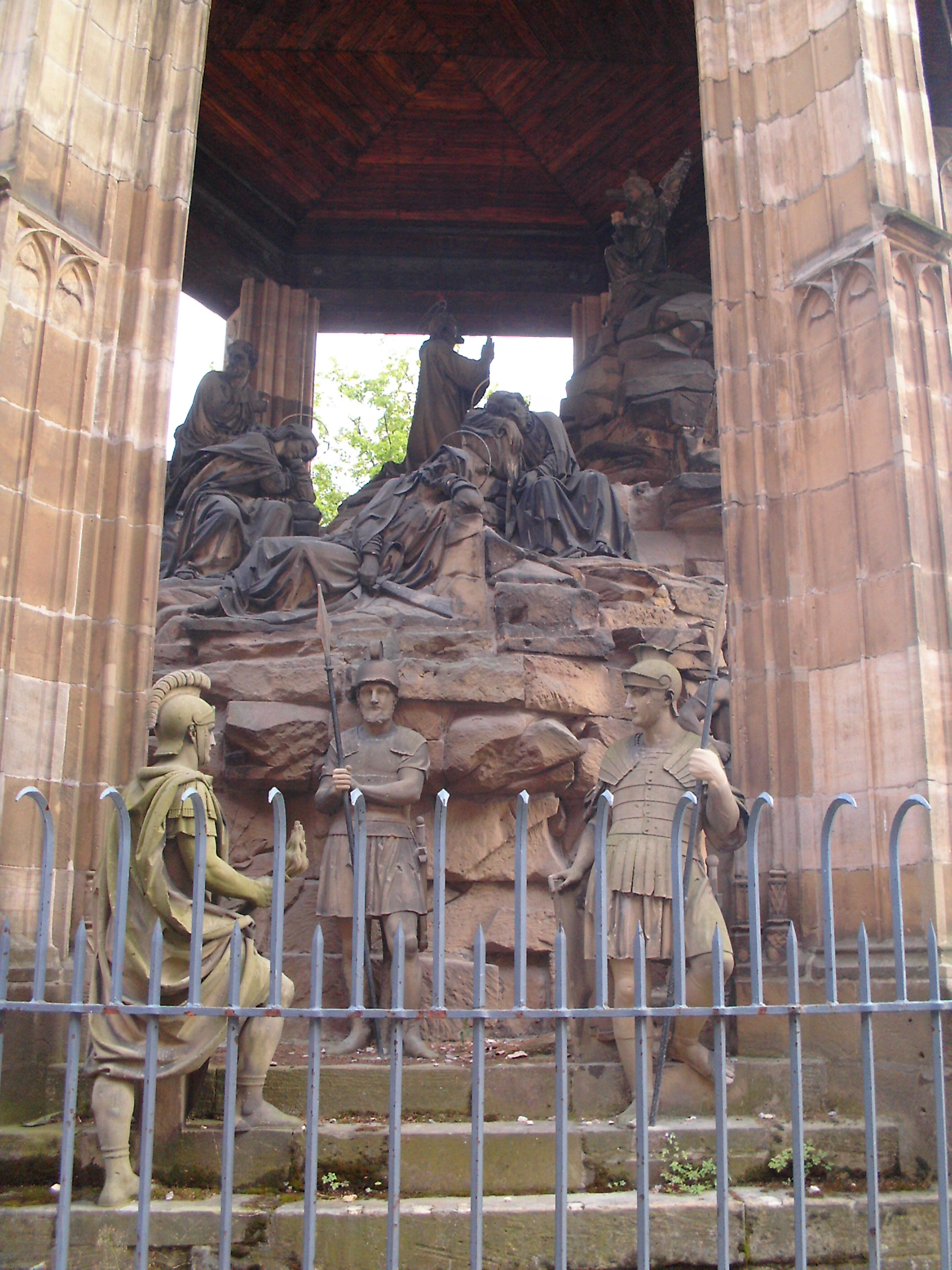
The Mount of Olives created outside Speyer Cathedral during the reign of Philip I

In 1509 commissioned the Mount of Olives, a masterpiece of Renaissance sculpture. It was erected in a cloister on the south side of Speyer Cathedral. The cloister was destroyed in a fire in 1689; the Mount of Olives was damaged, but exists until this day.

From 1510 onwards, Philip I sent his Canon Philip II of Flersheim, the future bishop, as his envoy to important meetings, such as the Imperial Diets of 1512 in Trier and Cologne.

As Zimmern mentioned, Philip published a diocesan agenda with a pastoral theological chapter. He exhorted the priests in his diocese to adopt the diocesan breviary and to follow the diocesan rites and customs in their liturgy. He ordered the clergy to buy his liturgical books, in particular the breviary he had published in Venice.

The memoirs of Albert of Rosenberg from Boxberg relate how in 1507 Philip I mediated in a family dispute between the brothers Frederick and Arnold of Rosenberg about the inheritance of George of Rosenberg.

Bishop Philip I of Rosenberg died in 1513 in Udenheim, only 53 years old. He was buried in the cloister of Speyer Cathedral.

== Coat of arms ==
Philip's coat of arms is usually quartered. Two fields show the von Rosenberg family crest, alternating red and silver stripes. The other two fields show the arms of the Bishopric of Speyer, a silver cross on a blue background.

== Footnotes ==
Philip I of Rosenberg von Rosenberg Born: c. 1460 Died: 4 February 1513
Preceded by Louis of Helmstatt	Bishop of Speyer; 1504-1513	Succeeded by George of the Palatinate
