= Margaret of Bavaria, Electress Palatine =

Margaret of Bavaria
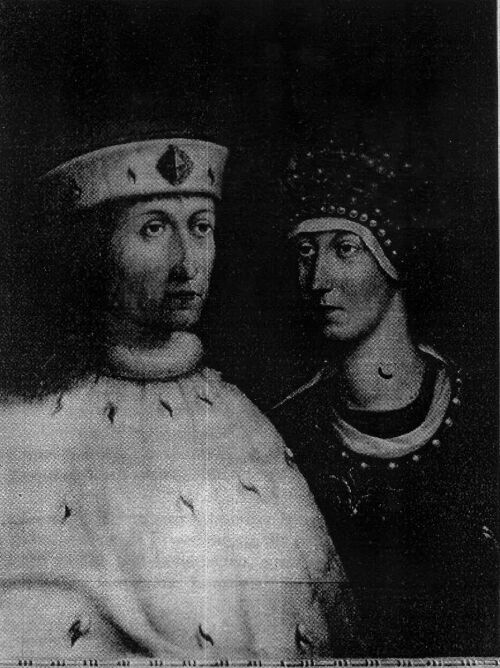
- Anonymous portrait of Margaret (right) with her husband Philip (left)

Electress Palatine
- Tenure: 23 February 1511 – 18 April 1519
- Born: 7 November 1456; Amberg, Electoral Palatinate, Holy Roman Empire
- Died: 25 January 1501 (aged 44); Heidelberg, Electoral Palatinate, Holy Roman Empire
- Spouse: Philip, Elector Palatine
- Issue: Louis V, Elector Palatine; Philip; Ruprecht; Frederick II, Elector Palatine; Elisabeth, Landgravine of Hesse; Georg; Henry; John III; Amalie, Duchess of Pomerania-Wolgast; Barbara; Helena, Duchess of Mecklenburg-Schwerin; Wolfgang; Otto Henry; Catherine
- Father: Louis IX "the Rich" of Bavaria-Landshut
- Mother: Amalia of Saxony

Margaret of Bavaria (7 November 1456 – 25 January 1501) was a princess of Bavaria-Landshut and by marriage Princess of the Palatinate.

== Life ==
Margaret was a daughter of the Duke Louis IX "the Rich" of Bavaria-Landshut (1417–1479) from his marriage to Amalia of Saxony (1436–1501), daughter of Elector Frederick II of Saxony

She married in 1474, with an elaborate celebration in Amberg (the "Amberg Wedding") Philip, who later became Elector Palatine Philip the Upright (1448–1508). He had earlier turned down marriage candidates such as Mary of Burgundy and Anna, heiress of the county of Katzenelnbogen. More than 1,000 guests were present at the wedding, including 14 ruling princes. Large quantities of food were consumed, in addition to 110,000 liters of wine as well as 10,000 chickens.

Two years after the marriage, Philip became Elector of the Palatinate. In 1482 Margaret left Heidelberg, fleeing from the plague, for Winzingen Castle, where she gave birth to Frederick, who later became Elector Frederick II.

Thanks to his wife, Philip had a good relationship with her brother Duke George the Rich, whose children married each other in 1499. The dynastic union was the starting point of political and military cooperation between Bayern-Landshut and the Palatinate. George, who had no male heir of his own, bequeathed his territory to his son in law and the son of his sister.

== Offspring ==
From her marriage, Margaret had the following children:

1. Louis (2 July 1478 – 16 March 1544).
2. Philip (5 July 1480 – 5 January 1541), Bishop of Freising (1498–1541) and of Naumburg (1517–41).
3. Ruprecht (14 May 1481 – 20 August 1504), Bishop of Freising (1495–1498), father of Otto Henry, Elector Palatine.
4. Frederick (9 December 1482 – 26 February 1556). He married; no issue.
5. Elisabeth (16 November 1483 – 24 June 1522), married:
  1. in 1498 to William III, Landgrave of Hesse-Marburg;
  2. in 1503 to Philip I, Margrave of Baden.
6. Georg (10 February 1486 – 27 September 1529), Bishop of Speyer (1515–1529).
7. Henry (15 February 1487 – 3 January 1552), Bishop of Utrecht (1523–1529) and of Freising (1541–1552), Bishop of Worms (1523–1552).
8. John III (7 May 1488 – 3 February 1538), Bishop of Regensburg (1507–1538).
9. Amalie (25 July 1490 – 6 January 1524), married in 1513 to George I, Duke of Pomerania-Wolgast.
10. Barbara (28 August 1491 – 15 August 1505).
11. Helena (9 February 1493 – 4 August 1524), married in 1513 to Henry V, Duke of Mecklenburg-Schwerin.
12. Wolfgang (31 October 1494 – 2 April 1558).
13. Otto Henry (6 May 1496 – 31 May 1496).
14. Catherine (14 October 1499 – 16 January 1526).

== Ancestors ==
Ancestors of Margaret of Bavaria, Electress Palatine

16. Stephen II, Duke of Bavaria
8. Frederick, Duke of Bavaria
17. Elisabeth of Sicily
4. Henry XVI, Duke of Bavaria
18. Bernabò Visconti
9. Maddalena Visconti
19. Beatrice Regina della Scala
2. Louis IX, Duke of Bavaria
20. Albert III, Duke of Austria
10. Albert IV, Duke of Austria
21. Beatrix of Nuremberg
5. Margarete of Austria
22. Albert I, Duke of Bavaria
11. Joanna Sophia of Bavaria
23. Margaret of Brieg
1. Margaret of Bavaria, Electress Palatine
24. Frederick III, Landgrave of Thuringia (1332-1381)
12. Frederick I, Elector of Saxony
25. Catherine of Henneberg (1334-1397)
6. Frederick II, Elector of Saxony
26. Henry the Mild, Duke of Brunswick-Lüneburg (1355-1416)
13. Catherine of Brunswick-Lüneburg
27. Sophie of Pomerania (1370-1406)
3. Amalia of Saxony, Duchess of Bavaria
28. Leopold III, Duke of Austria (1351-1386)
14. Ernest, Duke of Austria
29. Viridis Visconti (1350-1414)
7. Margaret of Austria, Electress of Saxony
30. Siemowit IV, Duke of Masovia
15. Cymburgis of Masovia
31. Alexandra of Lithuania
