= Philip, Duke of Mecklenburg =

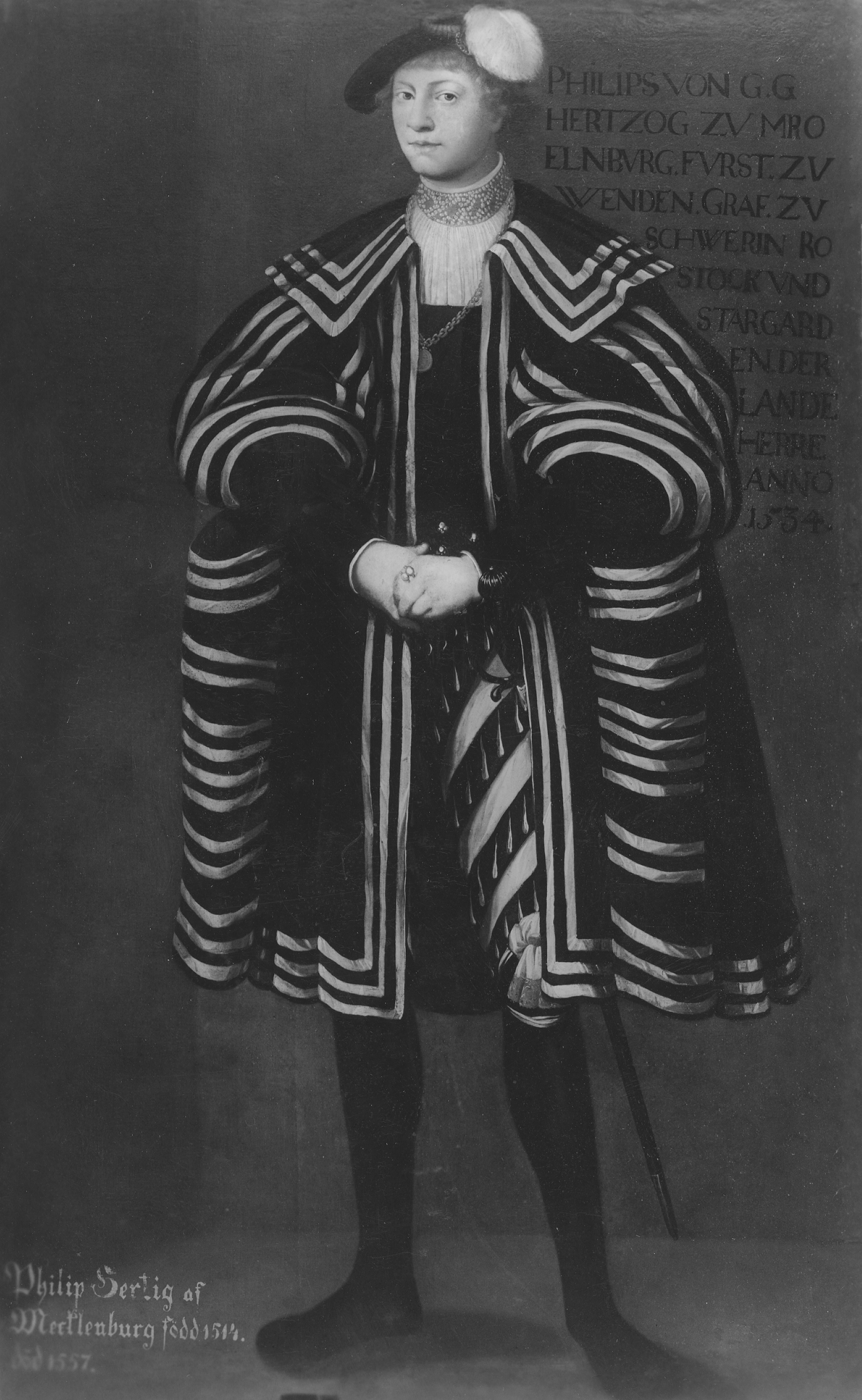
- Portrait attributed to David Frumerie, 17th century

Duke of Mecklenburg-Schwerin
- Reign: 6 February 1552 - 4 January 1557
- Predecessor: Henry V
- Successor: John Albert I
- Co-Ruler: John Albert I (1552–1557)
- Born: 12 September 1514; Schwerin
- Died: 4 January 1557 (aged 42); Güstrow
- Burial: Doberan Minster
- House: House of Mecklenburg
- Father: Henry V, Duke of Mecklenburg
- Mother: Helen of the Palatinate

Philip, Duke of Mecklenburg, sometimes called Philip I (12 September 1514 – 4 January 1557) was a Duke of Mecklenburg-Schwerin.

He was the youngest son of Henry V, Duke of Mecklenburg, and Helen of the Palatinate, a daughter of Philip, Elector Palatine. As a result of an injury at a tournament he was mentally ill for many years. After Henry V's death in 1552, he lived at the court of Duke Ulrich of Mecklenburg in Güstrow, where he died. Whether he ruled actively is questionable in the light of his disability.

He was buried in the Doberan Minster.

Philip, Duke of Mecklenburg House of Mecklenburg Born: 12 September 1514 Died: 4 January 1557
Preceded by Henry V	Duke of Mecklenburg-Schwerin; 1552-1557	Succeeded by John Albert I
