= Frederick, Elector Palatine =

Frederick, Elector Palatine may refer to:

- Frederick I, Elector Palatine (1425–1476)
- Frederick II, Elector Palatine (1482–1556)
- Frederick III, Elector Palatine (1515–1576)
- Frederick IV, Elector Palatine (1574–1610)
- Frederick V, Elector Palatine (1596–1632)
