= Ludwig IX =

Ludwig IX may refer to:

- Louis IX, Duke of Bavaria (1417–1479)
- Louis IX, Landgrave of Hesse-Darmstadt (1719–1790)
