= Wolfgang of the Palatinate =

German nobleman

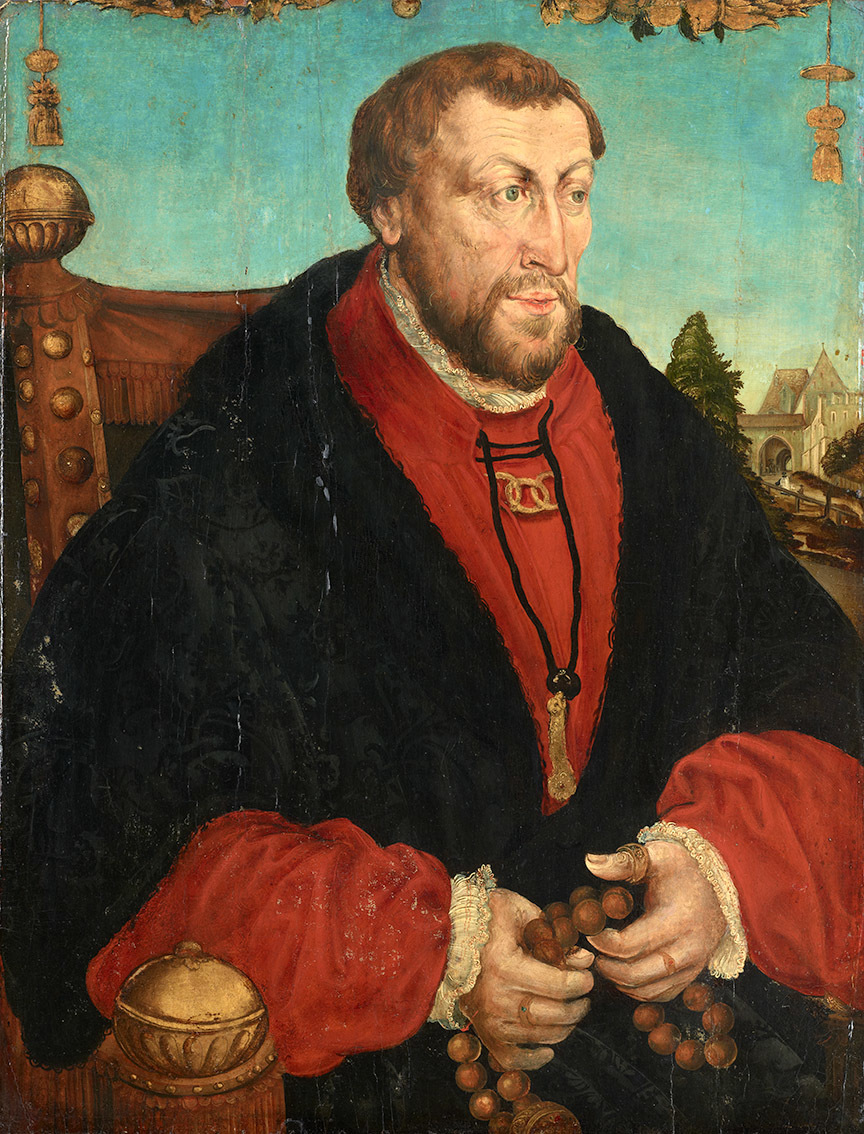
- Wolfgang of the Palatinate
- Born: 31 October 1494; Heidelberg
- Died: 2 April 1558 (aged 63); Neumarkt
- Burial: Church of the Holy Spirit, Heidelberg
- House: Palatinate-Neumarkt
- Father: Philip, Elector Palatine
- Mother: Margaret of Bavaria, Electress Palatine

Wolfgang of the Palatinate (nicknamed the Elder; 31 October 1494 in Heidelberg – 2 April 1558 in Neumarkt) was a German nobleman from the House of Wittelsbach. He was Count Palatine of Neumarkt and governor of the Upper Palatinate.

== Life ==
Wolfgang was a son of the Elector Palatine Philip (1448-1508) from his marriage to Margaret (1456-1501), the daughter of Duke Louis IX of Bavaria-Landshut. His parents intended Wolfgang to have a religious career. He was a canon in Augsburg, Würzburg and Speyer, and from 1515 Rector Magnificus of the university of Wittenberg. In 1524, Wolfgang returned to the lay state.

In 1522, Wolfgang became a member of the Teutonic Knights and in 1524, he received Neumarkt as an apanage. In 1544, he was appointed governor of the Upper Palatinate at Amberg. He was considered a friend and patron of the sciences.

Wolfgang died in 1558, unmarried and childless. He was buried in the Church of the Holy Spirit in Heidelberg.
