= Hedwig, Abbess of Quedlinburg =

Hedwig
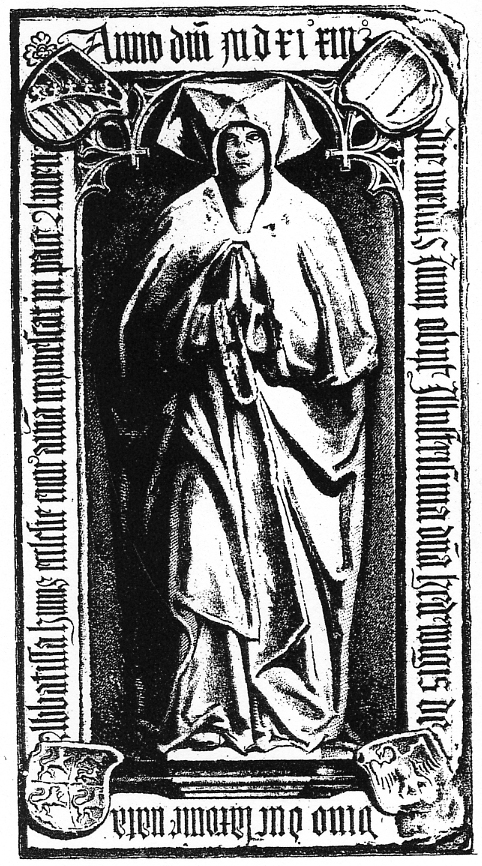
- Tombstone of Princess-Abbess Hedwig

Princess-Abbess of Quedlinburg
- Reign: 1458–1511
- Predecessor: Anna I
- Successor: Magdalene
- Born: 31 October 1445; Meissen
- Died: 13 June 1511 (aged 65); Quedlinburg
- House: House of Wettin
- Father: Frederick II, Elector of Saxony
- Mother: Margaret of Austria-Styria
- Religion: Roman Catholicism

Hedwig of Saxony (31 October 1445 – 13 June 1511) was Princess-Abbess of Quedlinburg from 1458 until her death.

== Accession ==
Born in Meissen, Hedwig was the youngest daughter of Frederick II, Elector of Saxony, and Margaret of Austria. In 1458, the chapter of the Quedlinburg Abbey elected the 12-year-old Hedwig as successor to Princess-Abbess Anna I, who had died aged 42. Pope Calixtus III confirmed the election but decreed that the Princess-Abbess should reign under the guardianship of her father and canonesses of Quedlinburg until the age of 20. In 1465, she was invested with regalia by her maternal uncle, Emperor Frederick III, and started governing the abbey-principality on her own.

== Reign ==
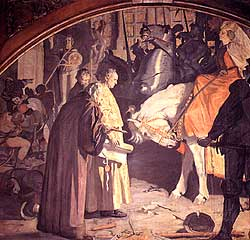
Submission of the town of Quedlinburg to Princess-Abbess Hedwig

In 1460, the Princess-Abbess faced a rebellion when the city of Quedlinburg joined the Hanseatic League, attempting to gain independence from her and become a free imperial city. Gebhard von Hoym, Bishop of Halberstadt, aided the rebellion. The Bishop invaded the abbey-principality and tried to evict Hedwig. As a princess-abbess, Hedwig was subject only to the Pope and the Emperor; she forced the Bishop to renounce his claim with the help of her brothers, Elector Ernest and Duke Albert III of Saxony. Thus, for the next two centuries, the abbey-principality remained under the protection of the electors of Saxony, who would influence the election of its new rulers and often come into conflicts with them. Upon subduing the rebels, Hedwig forced the town to leave the Hanseatic League and decided to strengthen her authority within the town.

Her uncle, Emperor Frederick III, admitted her to the Order of the Vase and Stole. She died in Quedlinburg and was succeeded by Magdalene of Anhalt.

== Bibliography ==
- Vollmuth-Lindenthal, Michael: Äbtissin Hedwig von Quedlinburg. Reichsstift und Stadt Quedlinburg am Ende des 15. Jahrhunderts, in: Mitteldeutsche Lebensbilder. Menschen im späten Mittelalter, Werner Freitag, Böhlau, Cologne, 2002, pages 69–88.

Hedwig House of Wettin
Preceded by Anna I	Princess-Abbess of Quedlinburg; 1458–1511	Succeeded by Magdalena
