= Philip of the Palatinate =

Prince-Bishop of Freising from 1498 to 1541

- Prince-Bishop of Freising
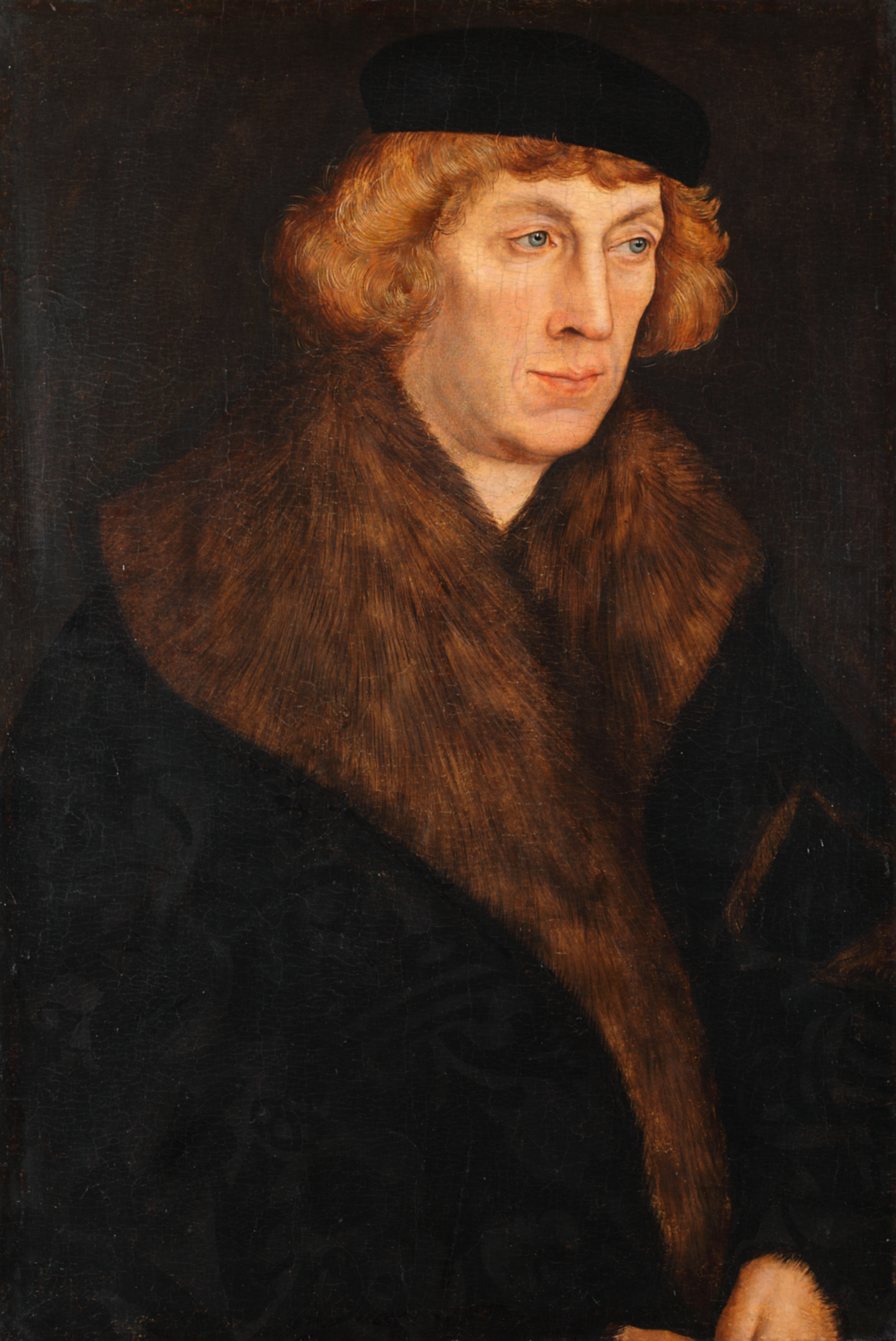
- Portrait of Prince-Bishop Philip of the Palatinate by Lucas Cranach the Elder
- Church: Catholic Church
- Diocese: Freising
- See: Freising
- In office: 3 December 1498 - 5 January 1541
- Predecessor: Ruprecht of the Palatinate
- Successor: Henry of the Palatinate
- Previous post: Bishop of Naumburg

Personal details
- Born: 5 July 1480 Heidelberg
- Died: 5 January 1541 (aged 60) Freising
- Buried: Freising Cathedral

Philip of the Palatinate (German: Philipp von der Pfalz; 5 July 1480 in Heidelberg – 5 January 1541 in Freising) was Prince-Bishop of Freising (1498–1541) and Naumburg (1517–1541). He was a member of the house of Wittelsbach, and the son of Elector Palatine Philip and Margaret of Bavaria. Among 14 children, he was the second oldest son. Several contemporary portraits of him are known.

== Bishop of Freising ==
Philip defended the diocese of Freising successfully in the turmoil of the German Peasants' War. He managed to keep the Bavarian dukes out of the policy of the bishopric. He initiated many construction projects and is buried in the Freising Cathedral.

== Bishop of Naumburg ==
On 17 September 1512, he was appointed Coadjutor of bishop John III of Schönberg of Naumburg. After John died, Philip was appointed Bishop of Naumburg as well. He stayed in Naumburg for ten months. After that, his primary residence was again in Freising, while Naumburg was mostly ruled by administrators. As he enjoyed the good will of the House of Wettin, he took a moderate attitude towards Martin Luther. After the death of Frederick III and the emerging resistance of the Naumburg and Zeitz citizenship, Philip moved to the Catholic camp and paid no more visits to Naumburg. He was tired of ruling and tried to find a successor to the bishopric of Naumburg.

== Bibliography ==
- Heinz Wießner, Das Bistum Naumburg 1 - Die Diözese 2, Max-Planck-Institut für Geschichte (ed.), Germania Sacra, NF 35.2, Die Bistumer der Kirchenprovinz Magdeburg, Berlin/New York, 1998, pp. 951–965.

Philip of the Palatinate House of Wittelsbach Born: 5 July 1480 Died: 5 January 1541
Catholic Church titles
Preceded by Ruprecht of the Palatinate	Prince-Bishop of Freising; 1498 - 1541	Succeeded by Henry of the Palatinate
Preceded by John III of Schönberg	Bishop of Naumburg; 1517 - 1541	Succeeded by Nicholas of Amsdorf
