= George of the Palatinate =

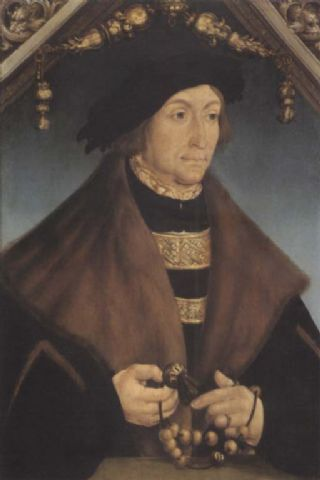
- Bishop George of the Palatinate, contemporary painting on wood
- Born: 10 February 1486; Heidelberg
- Died: 27 September 1529 (aged 43); Kislau Castle in Bad Mingolsheim
- Buried: Speyer Cathedral
- Noble family: House of Wittelsbach
- Father: Philip, Elector Palatine
- Mother: Margaret of Bavaria-Landshut

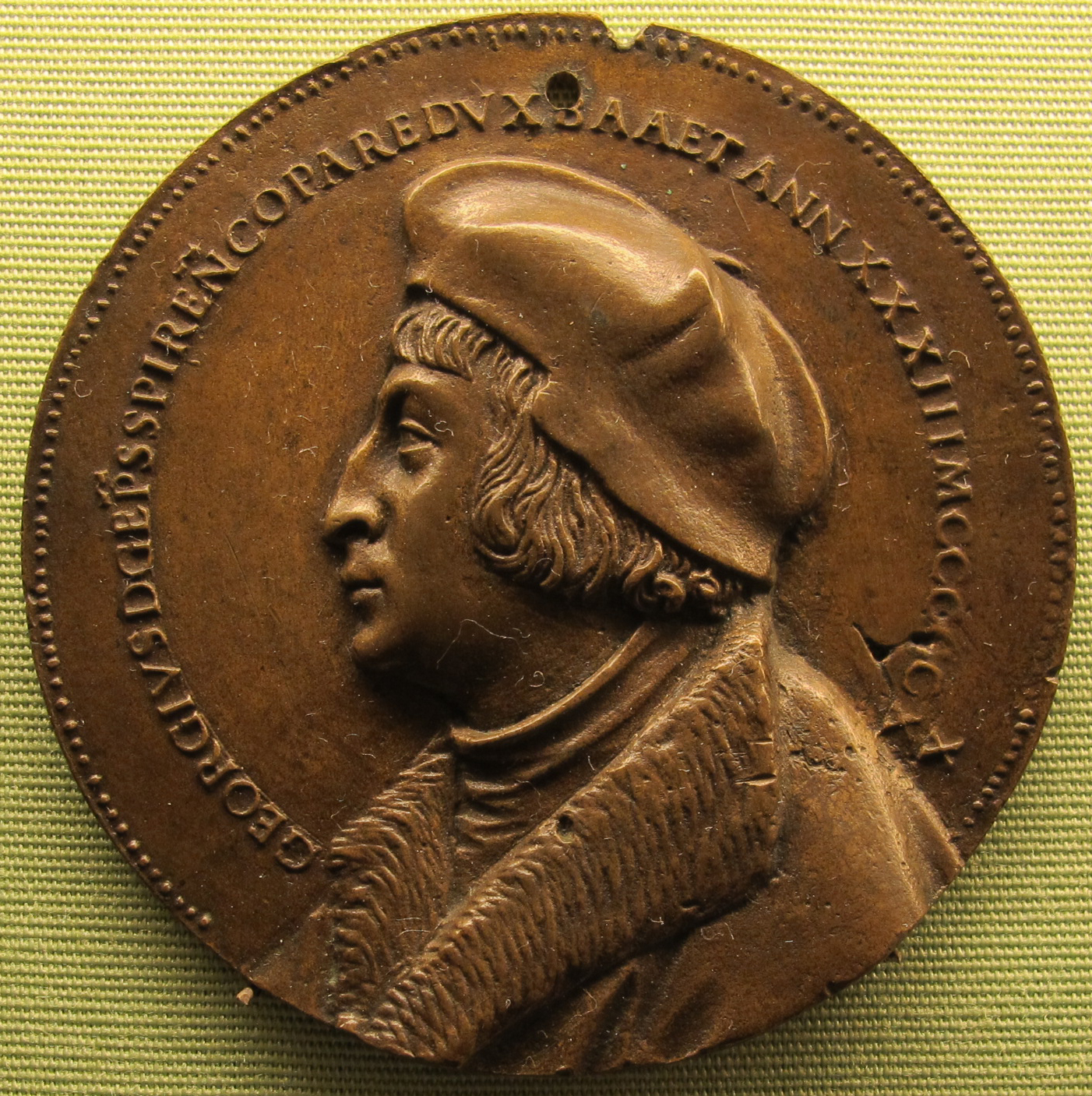
Medallion depicting George of the Palatinate" by Hans Schwarz, 1520

George of the Palatinate (10 February 1486 – 27 September 1529) was Bishop of Speyer from 1513 to 1529.

== Life ==
Georg was born 10 February 1486 (O.S.) in Heidelberg. His parents were Elector Palatine Philip and his wife Margaret of Bavaria-Landshut, a daughter of Duke Louis the Rich.

He held posts as canon in Mainz, Trier and Speyer and was Provost in Mainz from 1499 to 1506. From 10 November 1502, he was also Dean of St. Donatian in Bruges. Later, he was priest at Hochheim and Lorch. On 12 February 1513, he became Bishop of Speyer. He studied theology in Heidenberg in 1514 and received his Holy Orders on 10 July 1515. On 22 July 1515, he was consecrated as bishop.

George sought to improvide discipline among the clergy in his diocese and forbade the study of the writings of Martin Luther. However, he could not prevent his suffragan bishop Engelbrecht from converting to the new faith. On 28 April 1523, he published his most memorable letter to his clergy, which states:

The suspect teachings of Luther, which oppose the Holy Catholic Church and our ancient traditions, we must mention to our great distress, have been sprinkled and sown among the uneducated believers in many places and parishes in our diocese by pastors and preachers and others, who were not nominated by us or our vicars general, causing not only aberrations, riots, murder and dangerous movements among the communities .... We urge you to hold Mass without any improprieties, with seclusion, seriousness, respect, dignity and prudence, with as much devotion as possible, in the fear of our Lord, and to instruct people, not only by teaching them the wholesome Catholic doctrine, but also by good actions, by an irreproachable conduct and to encourage them by example to be pious, so that when all the trouble and the contempt for the clergy have been removed, we, as fighters for Christ and mediators between God and the people, may be able to prevent our eternal damnation by prayer and by good works

— Bishop George of the Palatinate, in a pastoral latter of 28 April 1534, Franz Xaver Remling: The work of reform in the Palatinate, 1929 edition, p. 58-59

Around Easter 1525, the German Peasants' War spread to the diocese of Speyer and rebellious peasants raided the bishop's cellars. George fled to Heidelberg and the peasants occupied Kislau Castle, Rothenberg and Bruchsal Castle, set up a provisional government, invaded the Udenheim district and threatened Speyer itself. On 29 April 1525, George met the rebels at Herrenalb and promised them they would be allowed to appoint a preacher of their choice. He opened negotiations with the rebels at Philippsburg and signed an agreement with them on 5 May 1525. The revolt was later struck down by forces from the Electoral Palatinate and other principalities.

George participated in the Diet of Speyer in 1529 and died on 27 September 1529 of the sweating sickness. He was buried in the Speyer Cathedral. The monument on his grave was destroyed by French troops in 1689, during the Nine Years' War.

== Coat of arms ==
The bishop's coat of arms is quartered in the usual way. The fields of the shield alternately show the Wittelsbach family crest and the coat of arms of the Diocese of Speyer, a silver cross on a blue background.

== Footnotes ==
George of the Palatinate House of Wittelsbach Born: 10 February 1486 Died: 27 September 1529
Preceded by Philip I of Rosenberg	Prince-Bishop of Speyer; 1513-1529	Succeeded by Philip II of Flersheim
