= John III of Schönberg =

16th-century Catholic bishop

- Church: Catholic
- See: Naumburg-Zeitz
- In office: 1492-1517
- Predecessor: Dietrich IV of Schoenberg
- Successor: Philip of the Palatinate
- Previous post: coadjutor

Personal details
- Died: 26 September 1517 Zeitz
- Buried: Naumburg Cathedral

John III of Schoenberg (died: 26 September 1517 in Zeitz) was from 1492 to 1517 Bishop of Naumburg-Zeitz.

== Origin ==
John was a member of the noble Schoenberg family, which provided several bishops to the dioceses of Naumburg and Meisse. He was coadjutor to his uncle Dietrich IV of Schoenberg from 1483 and succeeded him in 1492. His parents were Henry of Schoenberg at Stollberg (d. 1507), who was captain of Schellenberg and Wolkenstein and an advisor to the Duke, and his wife, Ilse von Pflugk.

== Life ==
John studied at the University of Leipzig, and in Cologne. He was dean of Magdeburg, a canon of Meissen, provost at Bautzen and then magister scholarum of the cathedral chapter in Meissen. Pope Innocent VIII appointed him bishop, even though the cathedral chapter objected. The lucrative silver mining at Schneeberg continued. John III had a habit of appointing relatives to ecclesiastical offices, including two of his brothers. There indications that he may have been temporary mentally "confused" towards the end of his life.

In 1494, to the request of the city mayor and council, John expelled all the Jews from the city of Naumburg and the vicinity, and later was compensated by the city authorities for the loss of income due to Jewish taxes.

In 1511 the chapter proposed to appoint canon Vincent of Schleinitz as coadjutor, but the House of Wettin saw to it that their candidate Philip of the Palatinate was appointed instead.

John died in 1517 and was buried in Naumburg Cathedral. A bronze plaque of his tomb has survived.

== References and sources ==
- Heinz Wießner: Das Bistum Naumburg 1 - Die Diözese 2, in: Max-Planck-Institut für Geschichte (eds.): Germania Sacra, NF 35,2, Die Bistumer der Kirchenprovinz Magdeburg, Berlin/New York, 1998, pp. 938–951.

Specific

John III of Schönberg Schönberg Died: 26 September 1517
| Preceded by Dietrich IV of Schoenberg | Bishop of Naumburg-Zeitz; 1492-1517 | Succeeded by Philip of the Palatinate |
