= Amalia of Saxony, Duchess of Bavaria =

Amalia of Saxony
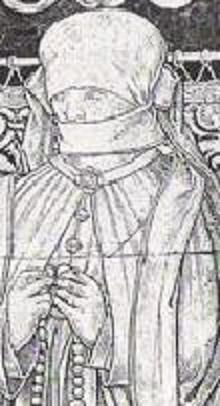
- Amalia, c. 1490

Duchess consort of Bavaria-Landshut
- Tenure: 21 March 1452 – 18 January 1479
- Born: 4 April 1436; Meissen
- Died: 1501 or 1502 (aged 65-66); Rochlitz
- Burial: Meissen Cathedral
- Spouse: Louis IX, Duke of Bavaria
- Issue among others...: George, Duke of Bavaria; Margaret
- House: House of Wettin
- Father: Frederick II, Elector of Saxony
- Mother: Margaret of Austria

Amalia of Saxony (4 April 1436 – 1501 or 1502) was a Saxon princess and Duchess consort of Bavaria-Landshut through her marriage to Louis IX, Duke of Bavaria.

== Life ==
Amalia was born in Meissen, the daughter of Frederick II, Elector of Saxony, and Margaret of Austria. She married Louis IX of Bavaria-Landshut in February 1452. The wedding was celebrated at Landshut. In 1463, Louis assigned Burghausen Castle to Amalia as her residence and issued detailed regulations governing her household.

Following her husband's death in 1479, Amalia acquired Rochlitz Castle in 1481, where she established a court. Around 1490, a timber-framed storey was added above the castle chapel to accommodate her household.

Amalia died at Rochlitz and was buried in Meissen Cathedral. Sources differ on her date of death; the Sächsische Biografie gives 19 November 1501 while Stauber gives 1502.

== Issue ==
Amalia and Louis had four children:

- Elisabeth (1452–1457)
- George, Duke of Bavaria (1455–1503), married Hedwig Jagiellon
- Margaret (1456–1501), married Philip, Elector Palatine
- Anna (1462–1462)

== Sources ==
- Günther, Maike (2003). "Schloß Rochlitz als Residenz und Witwensitz: Das Projekt einer Dauerausstellung". In Schattkowsky, Martina (ed.). Witwenschaft in der Frühen Neuzeit: Fürstliche und adlige Witwen zwischen Fremd- und Selbstbestimmung (in German). Leipziger Universitätsverlag. pp. 65–83.
- Kluckhohn, August (1865). Ludwig der Reiche, Herzog von Bayern: Zur Geschichte Deutschlands im 15. Jahrhundert (in German). C. H. Beck.
- Lackner, Irmgard (2010). Herzog Ludwig IX. der Reiche von Bayern-Landshut (1450–1479): Reichsfürstliche Politik gegenüber Kaiser und Reichsständen (PDF) (Doctoral dissertation) (in German). Universität Regensburg.
- Syrer, Christa (2024). Die Räume der Witwe: Architektur und Funktion fürstlicher Witwensitze in der Frühen Neuzeit, 1450–1650 (in German). Heidelberg University Publishing. doi:10.17885/heiup.1021.
- Stauber, Reinhard (1993). Herzog Georg von Bayern-Landshut und seine Reichspolitik: Möglichkeiten und Grenzen reichsfürstlicher Politik im wittelsbachisch-habsburgischen Spannungsfeld zwischen 1470 und 1505 (PDF). Münchener Historische Studien, Abteilung Bayerische Geschichte (in German). Vol. 15. Kallmünz: Michael Laßleben.

Amalia of Saxony, Duchess of Bavaria House of Wettin Born: 4 April 1436 Died: 19 October 1501
Royal titles
| Vacant Title next held by Margaret of Austria | Duchess of Bavaria-Landshut; 21 March 1452 – 18 January 1479 | Succeeded by Hedwig Jagiellon |
