= Neuburg Abbey =

Benedictine monastery in Baden-Württemberg, Germany

Coordinates: 49°25′08″N 8°44′27″E

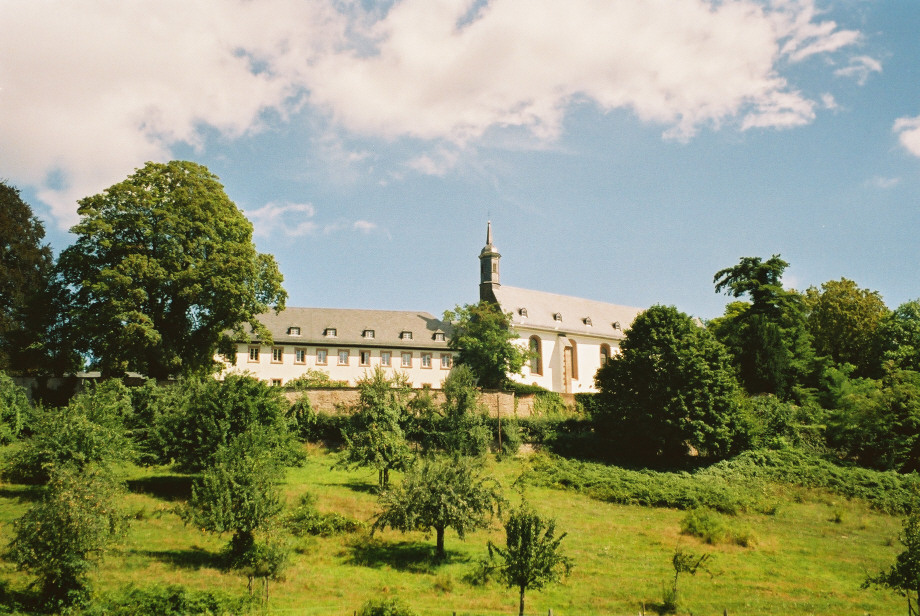
Neuburg Abbey.

Neuburg Abbey (German: Abtei Neuburg or Kloster Neuburg, but most commonly Stift Neuburg) near Heidelberg in Baden-Württemberg is a Benedictine monastery dedicated to Saint Bartholomew, and part of the Beuronese Congregation.

== History ==
=== First foundation ===
The monastery at Neuburg was founded in 1130 by Anshelm, a monk from the Benedictine Lorsch Abbey, as a priory of Lorsch. It did not thrive, and in 1195 was turned into a nunnery by order of Conrad of Hohenstaufen, Count Palatine of the Rhine, and raised to the status of abbey, but its condition did not improve as had been hoped. When Lorsch Abbey was suppressed in 1232 Neuburg passed under the authority first of the Bishop of Mainz and then of the Bishop of Worms, a strong advocate of the Cistercian reforms, and with the assistance of the nearby Schönau Abbey, a Cistercian monastery, Neuburg became a Cistercian nunnery. This at last boosted its fortunes, both spiritually and financially, resulting in a period of lively building activity during the 14th century. But another decline set in, and in 1462 at the instigation of Frederick I, Elector Palatine, the community reverted to the Benedictine observance.

During the Reformation, in 1562, the nunnery was suppressed.

=== Private property ===
The premises then became the property of the Electors Palatine, and were put to a variety of purposes, including in the 1660s and 1670s a Frauenstift, or a collegiate establishment for the accommodation of unmarried daughters of the nobility. The Stift lasted only a few years, but had an enduring influence on the name of the place, which from this point on has generally been known as Stift Neuburg.

In 1706 Johann Wilhelm II, Elector Palatine gave the premises to the Jesuits of Heidelberg, who constructed the buildings now to be seen on the site. After the suppression of the Jesuits in 1773, the former abbey reverted to the possession of the Elector and in 1799 was mortgaged in favour of Heidelberg University, passing into private hands in 1804. In 1825 it became the property of Johann Friedrich Heinrich Schlosser, a nephew by marriage of Goethe, and after his death to his wife's relatives, the von Bernus family.

=== Second foundation ===
In 1926 Neuburg was reacquired for the Benedictines from the poet and mystic Alexander von Bernus, and resettled by Beuron Archabbey. It was elevated to the status of an abbey in 1928.

The problems of the new foundation were great, and the first abbot, Adalbert von Neipperg, elected in 1929, resigned in 1934, after which the abbey was directed by an administrative board. The dissolution of the abbey during World War II was prevented by its being used as a refuge for the inmates of a bombed-out old people's home from the Ruhrgebiet.

Serious development of the community began in 1948, under the newly elected second abbot, Dr. Albert Ohlmeyer. In 1960 the restored and extended church was dedicated. After Dr. Ohlmeyer's death in 1976 the community elected Dom Maurus Berve, and after his early decease in 1986, Dom Franziskus Heereman from the Trappist Mariawald Abbey in the Eifel. After Heereman had resigned in 2016, Dom Winfried Schwab from the Benedictine Admont Abbey in Austria was elected abbot. He resigned in 2018.

== See also ==
- List of Jesuit sites
