= Philip II of Flersheim =

German nobleman and Prince-Bishop

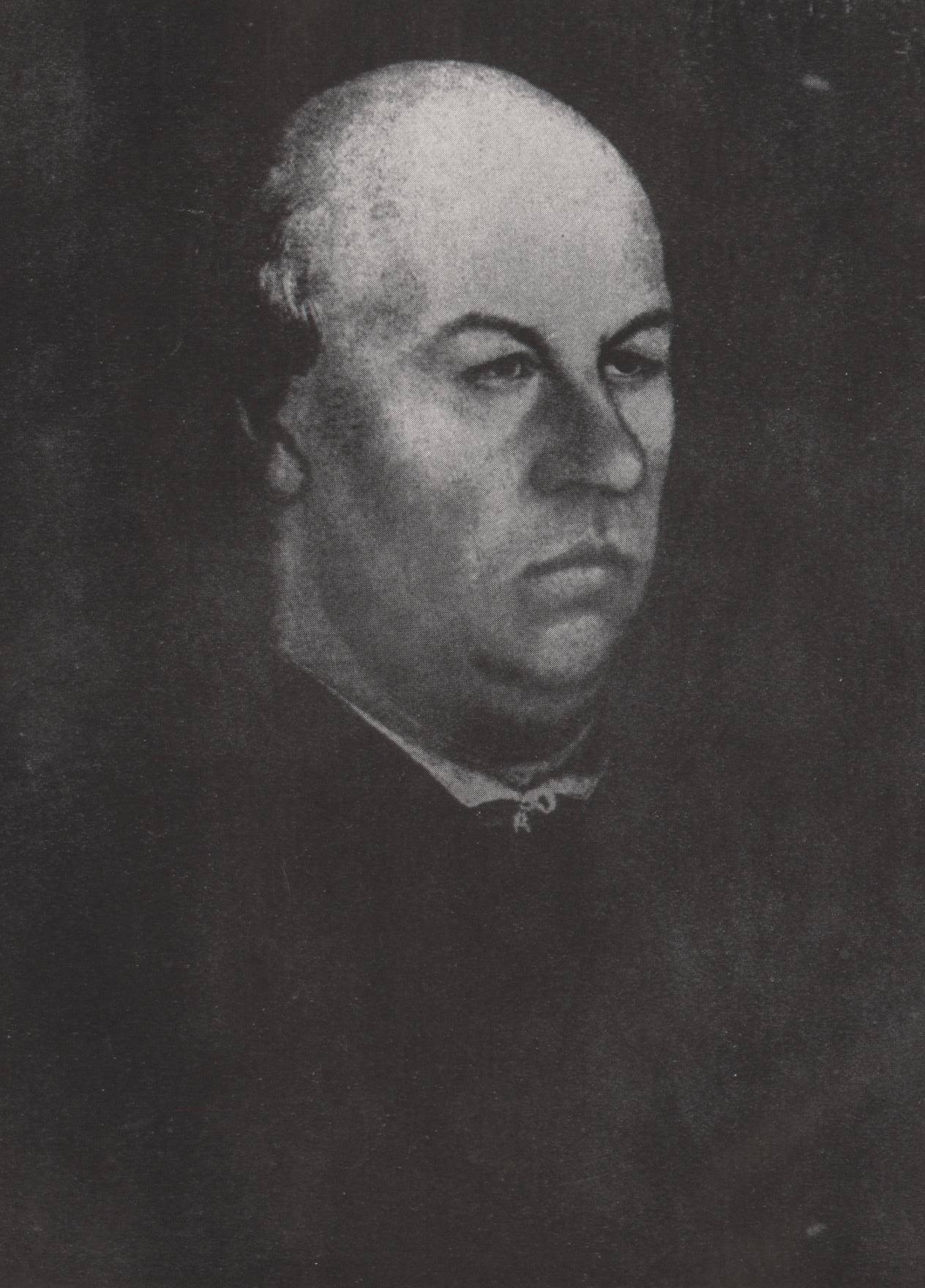
- Born: 1481; Kaiserslautern
- Died: 14 August 1552; Zabern
- Noble family: Flersheim
- Father: Hans of Flersheim
- Mother: Ottilie Kranich of Kirchheim

Philip of Flersheim (1481 in Kaiserslautern – 14 August 1552 in Zabern (now called Saverne) in the Alsace) was a German nobleman. He was Prince-bishop of Speyer as Philip II from 1529 until his death. From 1546 until his death, he was also Prince-provost of Weißenburg Abbey.

Philip II of Flersheim Flersheim Born: 1481 Died: 14 August 1552
Preceded by George of the Palatinate	Prince-bishop of Speyer; 1529-1552	Succeeded by Rudolph of Frankenstein
Preceded by Rüdiger Fischer	Prince-provost of Weißenburg; 1546-1552	Succeeded by Rudolph of Frankenstein
