= Johann Friedrich Heinrich Schlosser =

German jurist, writer and translator

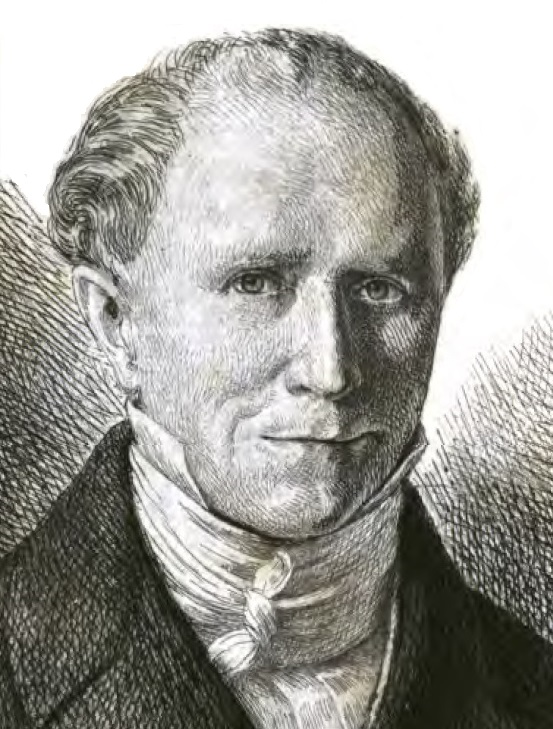
Johann Friedrich Heinrich Schlosser

Johann Friedrich Heinrich Schlosser (30 December 1780 in Frankfort-on-the-Main – 22 January 1851 in Frankfort-on-the-Main) was a German jurist, writer and translator.

== Life ==
Schlosser studied jurisprudence at various universities, among others at Jena, where he entered into familiar relations with Schiller and Goethe. After receiving the degree of Doctor of Jurisprudence (1803), he settled at Frankfort as an advocate, later being appointed, by Primate Karl Theodor Anton Maria von Dalberg, counsel of the municipal court (1806), counselor for the high schools and studies, and director of the grand-ducal lyceum (1812). On the dissolution of the Grand Duchy of Frankfurt, Schlosser resigned his office, and in 1814 entered the Catholic Church with his wife Sophie (née Du Fay).

He was one of the representatives of his native city at the Congress of Vienna. He was later one of the most determined champions of the rights of the Catholic community in Frankfort, and successfully advocated the civil equality of every Christian denomination. Soon, however, he withdrew from public life, and after 1825 usually spent the winter in Frankfort, passing the summer at his country seat, Neuburg Abbey near Heidelberg. As he was charitable, hospitable, and free from all denominational narrowness, and devoted himself wholeheartedly to scientific undertakings (e.g. the Monumenta Germaniae) besides possessing a fine artistic sense, his home soon became a centre for the leading spirits in literature, art, and science.

With Goethe he remained ever on terms of familiarity, and was his zealous collaborator in the romance "Aus meinem Leben". On the death of the great writer, Schlosser began a "Goethe Collection", which later passed to the ecclesiastical seminary at Mainz.

== Works ==
He wrote:

- Die morgenlandische orthodoxe Kirche Russlands (Heidelberg, 1845)
- Die Kirche in ihren Liedern durch alle Jahrhunderte (2 vols., Freiburg, 1851; 2nd ed., 1863)

After his death his wife published from his papers four booklets (1856-9), and Julius Frese published Goethe-Briefe aus Schlossers Nachlass (Stuttgart, 1877).
