= Margaret of Austria, Electress of Saxony =

Margaret of Austria
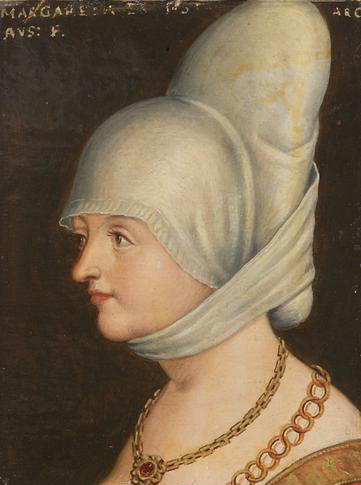
- Portrait by Anton Boys

Electress consort of Saxony
- Tenure: 3 June 1431 – 7 September 1464
- Born: c. 1416; Innsbruck, Tyrol
- Died: February 12, 1486 (aged 69–70); Altenburg, Saxony
- Spouse: Frederick II, Elector of Saxony (m. 1431; died 1464)
- Issue Detail: Amalia, Duchess of Bavaria; Anna, Electress of Brandenburg; Frederick, Electoral Prince of Saxony; Ernest, Elector of Saxony; Albert III, Duke of Saxony; Margaret, Abbess of Seusslitz; Hedwig, Abbess of Quedlinburg
- House: Habsburg (by birth); Wettin (by marriage)
- Father: Ernest, Duke of Austria
- Mother: Cymburgis of Masovia

Margaret of Austria (c. 1416 – 12 February 1486), a member of the House of Habsburg, was Electress consort of Saxony from 1431 until 1464 by her marriage with the Wettin elector Frederick II. She was a sister of Emperor Frederick III.

== Life ==
Born in Innsbruck, Margaret was the eldest daughter of the Inner Austrian duke Ernest the Iron (1377–1424) and his second wife, the Piast princess Cymburgis of Masovia (1394/97–1429). Upon her father's death, she and her siblings were raised under the tutelage of their uncle Duke Frederick IV of Austria.

At Wiener Neustadt, young Margaret was betrothed to Elector Frederick II, heir of both the Saxe-Wittenberg electorate and the Margravate of Meissen, not long after his accession in 1428; the wedding took place on 3 June 1431 in Leipzig. The conjugal bond with the Habsburgs strengthened her husband's position, particularly when Margaret's brother Duke Frederick V of Austria was elected King of the Romans in 1440 (as Frederick III). The electoral couple accompanied the new king to his coronation at Aachen Cathedral two years later. Margaret evolved plans to marry her first-born son Frederick to Elizabeth of Austria, daughter of her cousin King Albert II of Germany; however, the twelve-year-old boy died in 1451.

Margaret went on to reside at the Meissen court, where she had a significant impact on her husband's government: in 1432 she had all Jews expelled from the former margravate. In the Saxon Fratricidal War over the 1445 Division of Altenburg, she helped to reconcile her husband with his rebellious brother, Landgrave William III of Thuringia. Margaret received her own coinage (Margarethengroschen) and a mint in the Saxon burgraviate of Colditz, which caused further trouble with her brother-in-law William. Nevertheless, the minting privilege was finally confirmed by Emperor Frederick III in a 1463 deed.

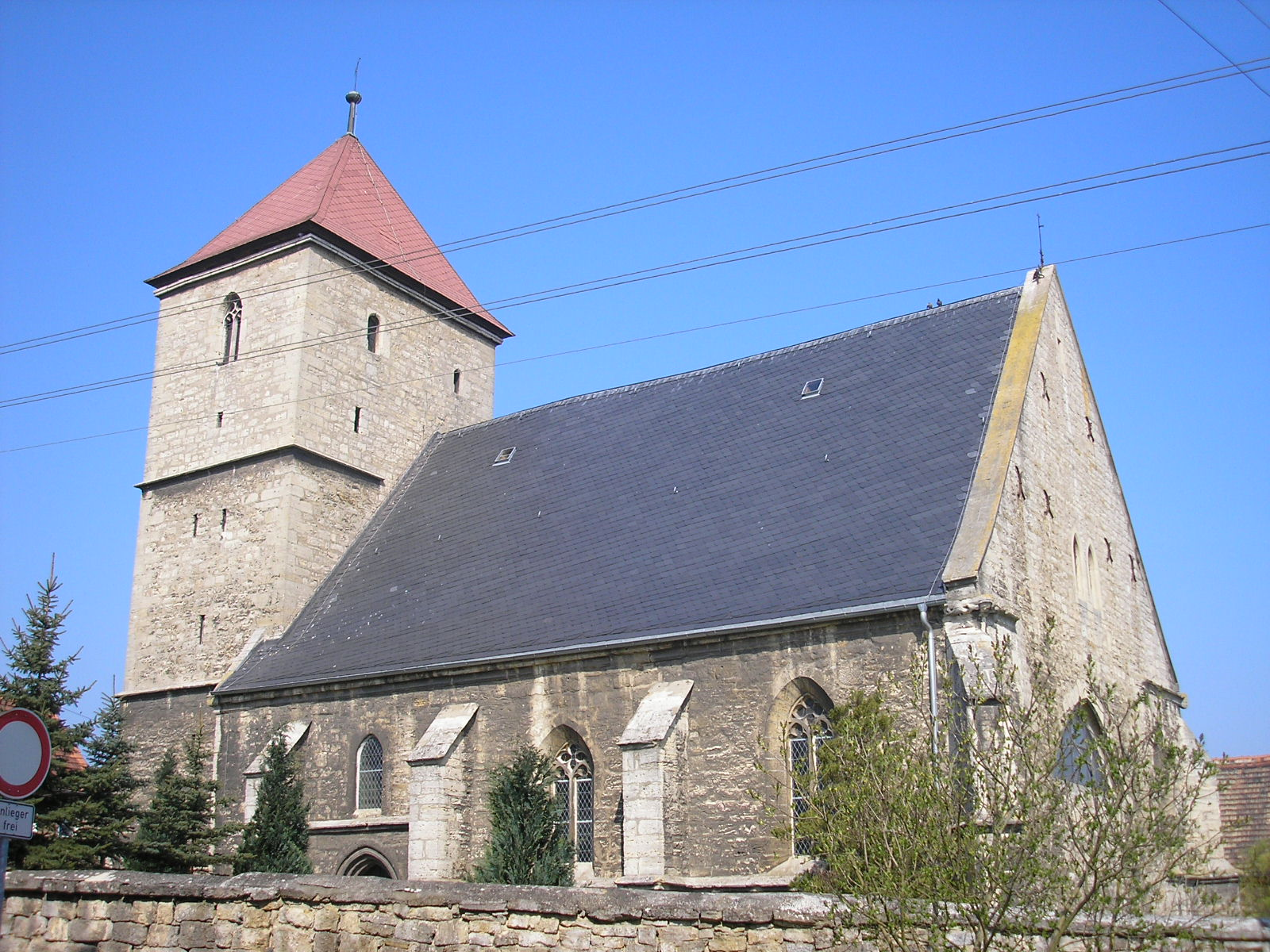
Fourteen Holy Helpers pilgrimage church, Jena

Margaret was regarded as a Christian-influenced woman. After the Saxon Fratricidal War, she set up a spiritual foundation and in 1453 laid the foundation for the Fourteen Holy Helpers (Vierzehnheiligen) sanctuary in a devastated village near Jena. The consecration of the pilgrimage church in 1464 marked the beginning of the resettlement.

In the night of 7/8 July 1455, her two minor sons Ernest and Albert were abducted from the castle of Altenburg by henchmen of the Saxon noble Kunz von Kaufungen, a former knight in the service of Elector Frederick II, who aimed to extort compensation for the losses that he suffered in the Fratricidal War. He nevertheless was pursued and captured in short time on his way to the Bohemian border, and the princes were saved.

After the death of her husband on 7 September 1464, Margaret received an extensive dowry, including the castle and city of Altenburg as well as nearby Leipzig, Liebenwerda, Colditz, Eilenburg and Liebenwerda. Until her death she lived at Altenburg Castle, where she exercised her sovereign rights and thus was under the jurisdiction. In the Old Castle in 1468, she set up a grain house, which was destroyed by fire in 1868. With the support of the Altenburg civil servants who cared for her household plot, Margaret gave generous supplies industries.

In 1485, she had to witness the division of the Saxon territories between her sons according to the Treaty of Leipzig. Margaret died the next year in Altenburg and was buried in the Castle's local church.

== Family ==
Margaret and Frederick had:

1. Amalia (b. Meissen, 4 April 1436 – d. Rochlitz, 19 October 1501), married on 21 March 1452 to Louis IX, Duke of Bavaria
2. Anna (b. Meissen, 7 March 1437 – d. Neustadt am Aisch, 31 October 1512), married on 12 November 1458 to Albert III Achilles, Elector of Brandenburg
3. Frederick (b. Meissen, 28 August 1439 – d. Meissen, 23 December 1451), died in childhood
4. Ernest, Elector of Saxony (b. Meissen, 24 March 1441 – d. Colditz, 26 August 1486)
5. Albert, Duke of Saxony (b. Grimma, 31 July 1443 – d. Emden, 12 September 1500)
6. Margaret (b. Meissen?, 1444 – d. Seusslitz?, ca. 19 November 1498), Abbess of Seusslitz
7. Hedwig (b. Meissen?, 31 October 1445 – d. Quedlinburg, 13 June 1511), Abbess of Quedlinburg (1458)
8. Alexander (b. Meissen, 24 June 1447 – d. Meissen, 14 September 1447), died in infancy.

== Source ==
- Hohkamp, Michaela (2007). "Sisters, Aunts, and Cousins: Familial Architectures and the Political Field in Early Modern Europe". In Sabean, David Warren; Mathieu, Jon; Teuscher, Simon (eds.). Kinship in Europe: Approaches to Long-Term Development (1300-1900). Berghahn Books. ISBN 9780857456861.

Margaret of Austria, Electress of Saxony House of Habsburg Born: c. 1416 Died: 12 February 1486
Royal titles
Vacant Title last held by Catherine of Brunswick-Lüneburg	Electress consort of Saxony; 3 June 1431 – 7 September 1464	Succeeded by Elisabeth of Bavaria
