= Philip, Elector Palatine =

Elector Palatine from 1476 to 1508

Philip the Upright
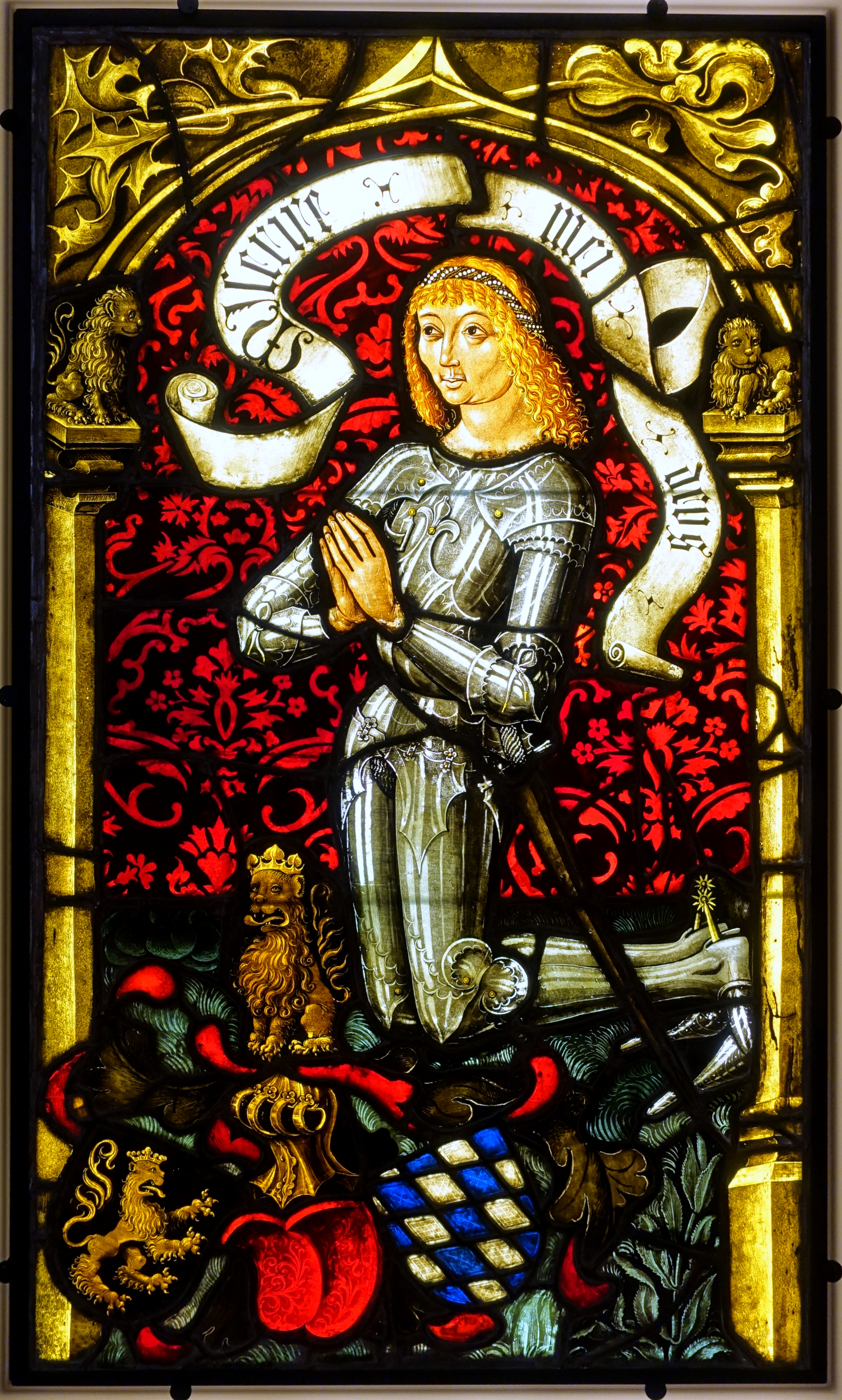
- Portrait of Philip as a donor in stained glass

Elector Palatine
- Reign: 12 December 1476 – 28 February 1508
- Predecessor: Frederick I
- Successor: Louis V
- Born: 14 July 1448; Heidelberg
- Died: 28 February 1508 (aged 59); Germersheim
- Spouse: Margaret of Bavaria
- Issue: Louis V, Elector Palatine; Philip; Ruprecht; Frederick II, Elector Palatine; Elisabeth, Landgravine of Hesse; Georg; Henry; John III; Amalie, Duchess of Pomerania-Wolgast; Barbara; Helena, Duchess of Mecklenburg-Schwerin; Wolfgang; Otto Henry; Catherine
- House: Wittelsbach
- Father: Louis IV, Count Palatine of the Rhine
- Mother: Margaret of Savoy

Philip the Upright (German: Philipp der Aufrichtige) (14 July 1448 – 28 February 1508) was an Elector Palatine of the Rhine from the house of Wittelsbach from 1476 to 1508.

== Biography ==
He was the only son of Louis IV, Count Palatine of the Rhine and his wife Margaret of Savoy. At the age of one year Philip fell under the guardianship of his uncle Frederick, who later adopted him. In 1474, he married Margaret of Bavaria-Landshut, the daughter of Louis IX, Duke of Bavaria and by virtue of the marriage received the Upper Palatinate. After the death of his adoptive father in 1476, he became the Elector. In 1499 he inherited the possessions of the branches of Palatinate-Mosbach and Palatinate-Neumarkt. Philip lost the Landshut War of Succession in 1504 to Albert IV, Duke of Bavaria.

In 1481 Philip invited Johann von Dalberg into the Ruprecht Karl University of Heidelberg.

== Family and children ==
Philip married Margaret of Bavaria (7 November 1456 – 25 January 1501) on 21 February 1474. They had the following children:

1. Louis V (2 July 1478 – 16 March 1544), Elector Palatine 1508–1544
2. Philip (5 July 1480 – 5 January 1541), Bishop of Freising (1498–1541) and of Naumburg (1517–41).
3. Ruprecht (14 May 1481 – 20 August 1504), Bishop of Freising (1495–1498), father of Otto Henry, Elector Palatine.
4. Frederick II (9 December 1482 – 26 February 1556), Elector Palatine 1544–1556
5. Elisabeth (16 November 1483 – 24 June 1522), married:
  1. in 1498 to William III, Landgrave of Hesse-Marburg;
  2. in 1503 to Philip I, Margrave of Baden.
6. Georg (10 February 1486 – 27 September 1529), Bishop of Speyer (1515–1529).
7. Henry (15 February 1487 – 3 January 1552), Bishop of Utrecht (1523–1529) and of Freising (1541–1552), Bishop of Worms (1523–1552).
8. John III (7 May 1488 – 3 February 1538), Bishop of Regensburg (1507–1538).
9. Amalie (25 July 1490 – 6 January 1524), married in 1513 to George I, Duke of Pomerania-Wolgast.
10. Barbara (28 August 1491 – 15 August 1505).
11. Helena (9 February 1493 – 4 August 1524), married in 1513 to Henry V, Duke of Mecklenburg-Schwerin.
12. Wolfgang (31 October 1494 – 2 April 1558).
13. Otto Henry (6 May 1496 – 31 May 1496).
14. Catherine (14 October 1499 – 16 January 1526).

== Ancestors ==
Ancestors of Philip, Elector Palatine

16. Rupert II, Elector Palatine
8. Rupert of Germany
17. Beatrice of Sicily
4. Louis III, Elector Palatine
18. Frederick V, Burgrave of Nuremberg
9. Elisabeth of Nuremberg
19. Elisabeth of Meissen
2. Louis IV, Elector Palatine
20. James of Piedmont
10. Amadeo, Prince of Achaea
21. Marguerite de Beaujeu
5. Matilda of Savoy
22. Amadeus III of Geneva
11. Catherine of Geneva
23. Mathilde d'Auvergne
1. Philip, Elector Palatine
24. Amadeus VI, Count of Savoy
12. Amadeus VII, Count of Savoy
25. Bonne of Bourbon
6. Amadeus VIII of Savoy
26. John, Duke of Berry
13. Bonne of Berry
27. Joan of Armagnac
3. Margaret of Savoy
28. John II of France
14. Philip the Bold
29. Bonne of Bohemia
7. Mary of Burgundy
30. Louis II of Flanders
15. Margaret III, Countess of Flanders
31. Margaret of Brabant

Philip, Elector Palatine House of Wittelsbach Born: 1448 Died: 1508
German royalty
Regnal titles
Preceded by Frederick I	Elector Palatine; 1476–1508	Succeeded by Louis V
