= Louis IX of Bavaria =

Duke of Bavaria-Landshut from 1450 to 1479

Louis IX

Duke of Bavaria-Landshut
- Reign: 30 July 1450 – 18 January 1479
- Predecessor: Henry XVI
- Successor: George
- Born: 23 February 1417; Burghausen, Bavaria
- Died: 18 January 1479 (aged 61); Landshut
- Spouse: Amalia of Saxony
- Issue among others...: George, Duke of Bavaria; Margaret
- House: House of Wittelsbach
- Father: Henry XVI, Duke of Bavaria
- Mother: Margaret of Austria

Louis IX (German: Ludwig IX, Herzog von Bayern-Landshut, also known as Louis the Rich; 23 February 1417 – 18 January 1479) was Duke of Bavaria-Landshut from 1450. He was a son of Henry XVI the Rich and Margaret of Austria. Louis was the founder of the University of Ingolstadt (now the Ludwig-Maximilians-Universität München or LMU Munich).

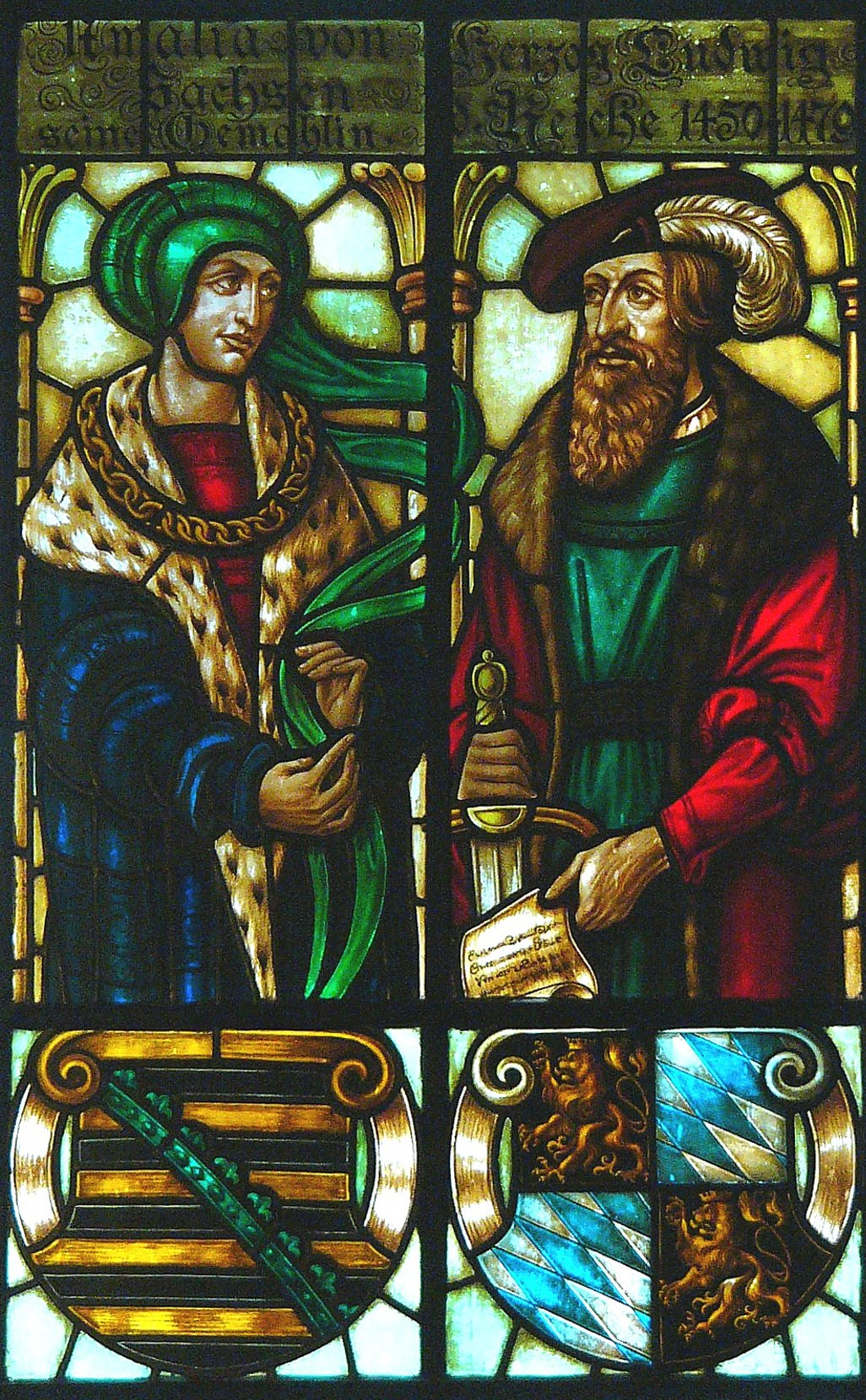
Louis IX and his wife Amalia of Saxony

== Biography ==
Louis succeeded his father in 1450. He was the second of the three famous rich dukes who reigned in Bavaria-Landshut in the 15th century. Their residence was Trausnitz Castle in Landshut, a fortification which attained enormous dimensions.

Louis invaded the imperial free cities of Dinkelsbühl and Donauwörth in 1458, and disputed with Frederick III, Holy Roman Emperor until peace was made in Prague in 1463. In 1462, Louis defeated his enemy Albert III, Margrave of Brandenburg, who tried to extend his influence in Franconia in the battle of Giengen. Louis expelled all Jews who rejected baptism from his duchy.

Louis founded a university in Ingolstadt in 1472, which was moved to Landshut in 1800 and finally to Munich in 1826; in 1802, it was renamed Ludwig-Maximilians-Universität. In 1475 he organized the Landshut Wedding of his son George with Hedwig Jagiellon, a daughter of King Casimir IV of Poland.

== Family and children ==
On 21 March 1452 Louis was married with Princess Amalia of Saxony, daughter of Frederick II, Elector of Saxony. They had four children:

1. Elisabeth (c. 1453 – 1457)
2. George, Duke of Bavaria (15 August 1455 – 1 December 1503)
3. Margaret (7 November 1456 – 25 February 1501), married on 21 February 1474 to Philip, Elector Palatine
4. Anna (c. 1462–1462)

Louis IX of Bavaria House of Wittelsbach Born: 23 February 1417 Died: 18 January 1479
Regnal titles
Preceded by Henry XVI	Duke of Bavaria-Landshut; 1450–1479	Succeeded by George the Rich
