= Michael von Faulhaber =

Archbishop of Munich and Freising from 1917 to 1952

His Eminence Michael von Faulhaber
- Cardinal Archbishop of Munich and Freising
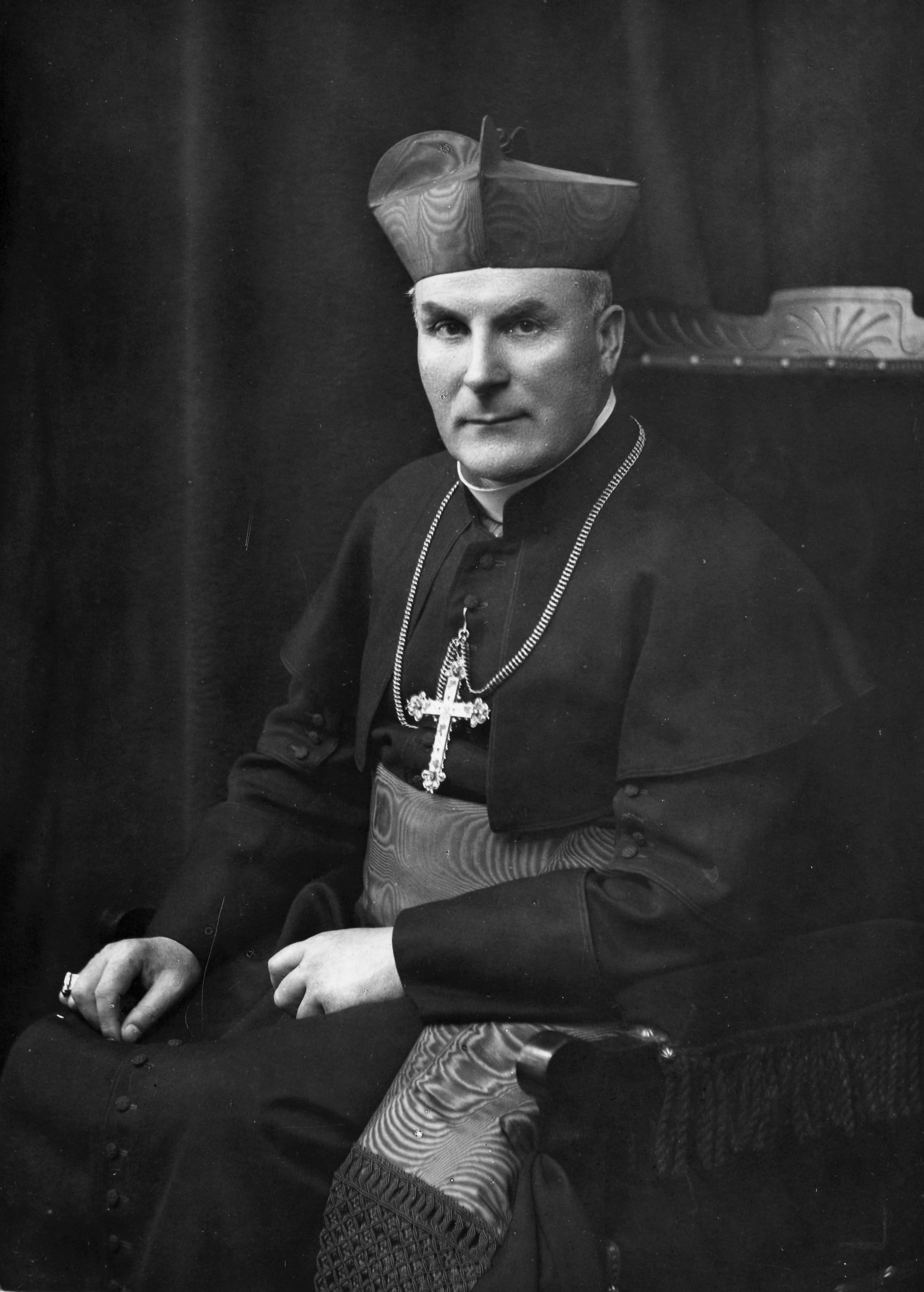
- Photograph by Wilhelm Knarr, c. 1936
- Archdiocese: Munich and Freising
- Appointed: 24 July 1917
- Installed: 3 September 1917
- Term ended: 12 June 1952
- Predecessor: Franziskus von Bettinger
- Successor: Joseph Wendel
- Other post: Cardinal-Priest of San Anastasia
- Previous post: Bishop of Speyer (1911–1917)

Orders
- Ordination: 1 August 1892 by Franz Joseph von Stein
- Consecration: 19 February 1911 by Franziskus von Bettinger
- Created cardinal: 7 March 1921 by Pope Benedict XV
- Rank: Cardinal-Priest

Personal details
- Born: Michael Faulhaber; 5 March 1869 Klosterheidenfeld, Unterfranken, Kingdom of Bavaria
- Died: 12 June 1952 (aged 83) Munich, Bavaria, West Germany
- Denomination: Catholic
- Motto: vox temporis vox Dei (the voice of the time is the voice of God)
- Coat of arms

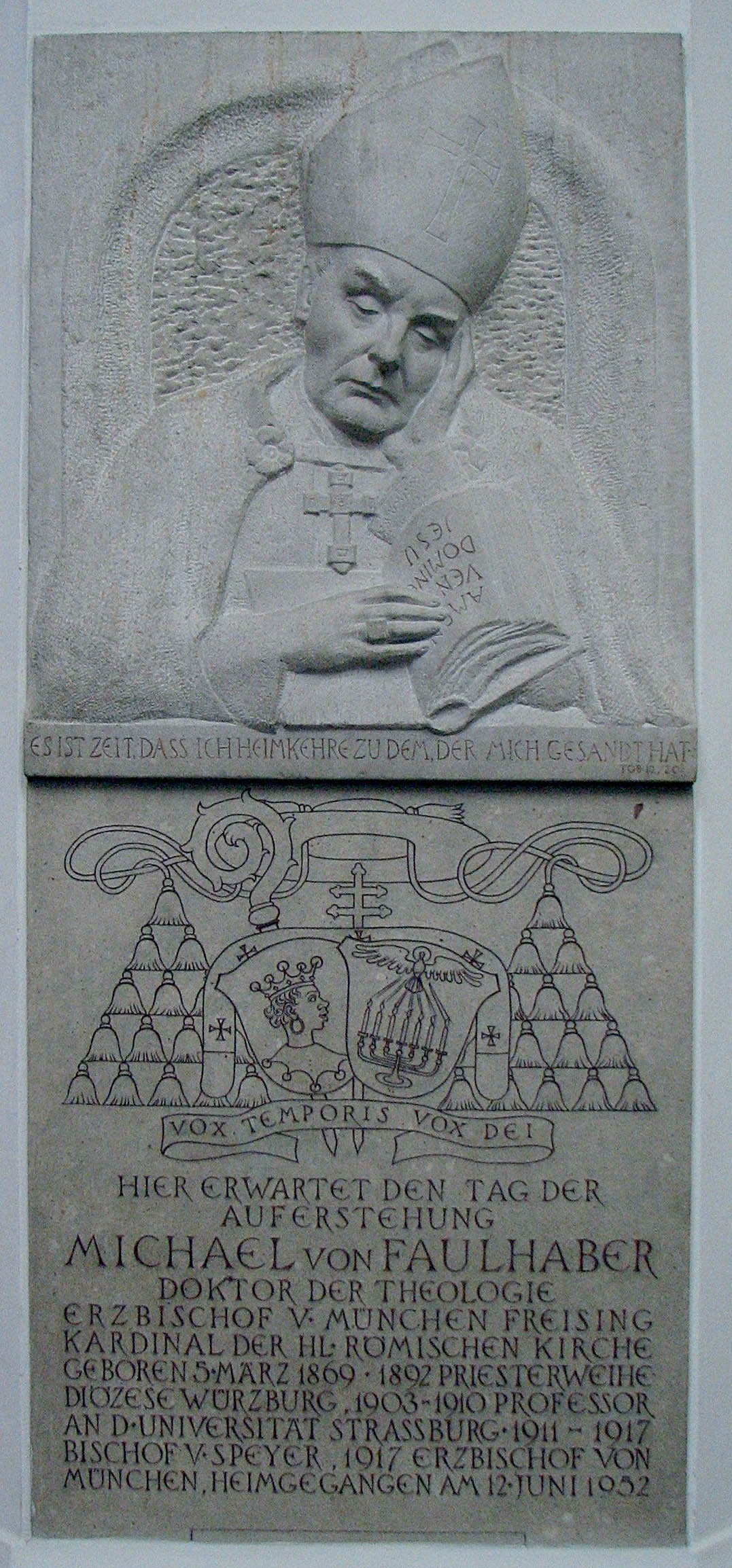
Memorial stone of von Faulhaber in the Munich Frauenkirche

Michael von Faulhaber (5 March 1869 – 12 June 1952) was a German Catholic prelate who served as Archbishop of Munich and Freising for 35 years, from 1917 to his death in 1952.

Created a cardinal in 1921, von Faulhaber remained an outspoken monarchist and denounced the Weimar Republic as rooted in "perjury and treason" against the German Empire during a speech at the 62nd German Catholics' Day of 1922. Cardinal von Faulhaber was a senior member and co-founder of the Amici Israel, a priestly association founded in Rome in 1926 with the goal of working toward the Jewish people's conversion to Christianity, while also seeking to combat antisemitism within the church. His legacy is complicated, having encouraged the German clergy's submission to the Nazi takeover, and acted as a vocal opponent of German democracy, while occasionally voicing opposition to certain actions of the Nazis. His advocacy for Jewish-Catholic reconciliation also grounded itself in a desire for Jews to convert to Catholicism.

After the Nazi Party seized control of the German government in 1933, von Faulhaber recognized the new Nazi government as legitimate, required Catholic clergy to be loyal to the government and maintained diplomatic bridges between the regime and the church, while simultaneously condemning certain Nazi policies, including religious persecution of members of the clergy, and actively supporting anti-Nazi German Catholics such as Fritz Gerlich and other persecuted persons. In 1937, von Faulhaber was involved in drafting the anti-Nazi encyclical Mit brennender Sorge. Von Faulhaber ordained Joseph Ratzinger (future Pope Benedict XVI) as a priest in 1951 and was the last surviving cardinal appointed by Pope Benedict XV.

== Life until after the First World War ==
Michael Faulhaber was born in Klosterheidenfeld, Bavaria, the third of seven children of the baker Michael Faulhaber (1831–1900) and his wife Margarete (1839–1911). He was educated at gymnasiums in Schweinfurt and Würzburg. In 1887-88 he was an officer cadet in the Bavarian army. In 1889 he entered the Kilianeum Seminary in Würzburg and was ordained on 1 August 1892. Faulhaber was a priest in Würzburg from 1892 until 1910, serving there for six years. His studies included a specialisation in the early Christian writer Tertullian. In 1895 he graduated from his studies with a doctorate in theology. From 1894 to 1896, he was prefect of the Kilianeum Seminary. From 1896 to 1899, he was engaged in studying manuscripts at the Vatican and other Italian museums. From 1899 to 1903, he was privatdocent in Greek paleography, Biblical archaeology, homiletics, and exegesis of the Psalms, at the University of Würzburg. In 1900 he visited England to study manuscripts of early Christian literature, spending one semester at Oxford. In 1902 he visited Spain for a similar purpose. In 1903 he became professor of theology at the University of Strasbourg. He also wrote a number of articles for the Catholic Encyclopedia.

In 1910, Faulhaber was appointed Bishop of Speyer and invested as such on 19 February 1911. On 1 March 1913, he was appointed a Knight of the Order of Merit of the Bavarian Crown by Prince Regent Ludwig; in accordance with the statutes of this order, Faulhaber was ennobled with the style of "Ritter von Faulhaber". In 1916 he won the Iron Cross (as the first cleric in the German Empire) at the Western Front for his frontline support of troops by acting as a military chaplain. In 1917, his appointment as Archbishop of Munich and Freising followed. In 1921 he became a cardinal, with the title of Cardinal-Priest of Sant'Anastasia, and at his death was the last surviving cardinal appointed by Pope Benedict XV.

Faulhaber felt little allegiance to the Weimar Republic. At the national Catholic conference (Katholikentag) of 1922 in Munich, he declared that the Weimar Republic was a "perjury and betrayal" because it had arrived through the overthrow of the legitimate civil authorities, the German royal houses, and had included in its constitution the separation of church and state. The declaration disturbed Catholics who were committed to the Weimar Republic, but von Faulhaber had already praised the German Empire a few months earlier during the Requiem Mass of the last King of Bavaria, Ludwig III.

Faulhaber publicised, and supported by creating an institutional link for the association, the work of Opus sacerdotale Amici Israel. He supported the group by distributing its writings, saying "We must ensure wide distribution of the writings of the Amici Israel" and admonishing preachers to steer clear of any statements that "might sound in any way anti-Semitic" – this even though, "he himself was somewhat tainted by anti-Semitic stereotypes that placed Jews in the same category as Freemasons and Socialists". Faulhaber was friends with the group's promoter, Sophie Francisca van Leer; its special aim was to seek changes to the Good Friday prayer and some of its Latin phrases such as pro perfidis Judaeis ("for treacherous Jews") and judaicam perfidiam ("Jewish treachery") and sought the cessation of the deicide accusation against Jews. It was dissolved in March 1928 on the decree of the Vatican's Congregation of the Holy Office on the grounds that its perspectives were not in keeping with the spirit of the church.

== Faulhaber and the Nazi Party ==
=== Rise of the Nazi Party ===
Faulhaber helped persuade Gustav von Kahr not to support Hitler during the Beer Hall Putsch. Its supporters turned against Faulhaber, who had denounced the Nazis in letters to Gustav Stresemann and Bavaria's Heinrich Held and blamed him for its failure; protests followed against Faulhaber, as well as the Pope, for an entire weekend.

In 1923, Faulhaber declared in a sermon that every human life was precious, including that of a Jew. When the nuncio wrote to Rome in 1923 complaining about the persecution of Catholics, he commented that "The attacks were especially focused on this learned and zealous" Faulhaber, who in his sermon and correspondence "had denounced the persecutions against the Jews".

In February 1924, Faulhaber spoke of Hitler and his movement to a meeting of Catholic students and academicians in Munich. He spoke of the "originally pure spring" that had been "poisoned by later tributaries and by Kulturkampf". But Hitler, he asserted, knew better than his minions, and that the resurrection of Germany would require the help of Christianity.

During the run up to the elections of March 1933, Faulhaber, unlike several other bishops who endorsed the Centre party, refrained from any comment in his pastoral letter issued on 10 February. The book of a Catholic author issued later in the year attributed the losses incurred by the Bavarian People's Party to the neutral position adopted by Faulhaber by asking "Had the Cardinal not indirectly pointed out the path to be followed in the future?"

On 1 April 1933, the government supported a nationwide boycott of all Jewish stores and businesses. German bishops discussed possible responses against these measures but Faulhaber was of the opinion it would only make matters worse. In the days preceding the boycott Cardinal Bertram asked for the opinion of brother bishops on whether the Church should protest. Faulhaber telegrammed Bertram that any such protest would be hopeless. After the 1 April 1933 boycott of Jewish-owned-and-operated stores Cardinal Pacelli received a letter from Faulhaber explaining why the Church would not intervene to protect Jews: "This is not possible at this time because the struggle against the Jews would at the same time become a struggle against Catholics and because the Jews can help themselves as the sudden end of the boycott shows". To Father Alois Wurm who asked why the Church did not condemn racist persecution in straightforward terms Faulhaber responded that the German episcopacy was "concerned with questions about Catholic schools, organizations, and sterilization which are more important for the Church in Germany than the Jews; the Jews can help themselves, why should the Jews expect help from the Church?" According to Saul Friedländer, "The 1933 boycott of Jewish businesses was the first major test on a national scale of the attitude of the Christian churches toward the situation of the Jews under the new government. In historian Klaus Scholder's words, during the decisive days around the first of April, no bishop, no church dignitaries, no synod made any open declaration against the persecution of the Jews in Germany".

==== Advent sermons ====
During Advent 1933, Faulhaber preached five sermons that Scholder describes as "being not directed against the practical, political anti-Semitism of the time, but against its principle, the racial anti-Semitism that was attempting to enter the Church". The sermons were given in St. Michael's, the largest church in Munich, though crowds were so great that both the neighbouring churches, the Studienkirche and Bürgersaal, had to be connected by loudspeakers.

Article 24 of the National Socialist program decried the Old Testament as offensive to moral values. Faulhaber was a former professor of the Old Testament at Strasbourg. In the sermons Faulhaber declared that he could not remain silent against attacks on, "the sacred books of the Old Testament [...] [w]hen racial research, in itself not a religious matter, attacks the foundations of Christianity". In Faulhaber defended the Old Testament against Nazi antisemitic readings, especially those advanced by Nazi theorist Alfred Rosenberg.

Saul Friedländer notes that Faulhaber himself later stressed he was not in these sermons "commentating on contemporary aspects of the Jewish issue". Friedländer notes that these sermons employed some of the more common stereotypical depictions of traditional religious antisemitism: "The daughters of Zion received their bill of divorce and from that time forth, Ahasuerus wanders, forever restless, over the face of the earth."

In his 17 December Advent sermon, Faulhaber spoke to the "People of Israel" about the "Old Testament" and declared "This treasure did not grow in your own garden... this condemnation of usurious land-grabbing; this war against the oppression of the farmer by debt, this prohibition of usury, is certainly not the product of your spirit!".

He admonished, "God always punishes the tormentors of his Chosen People, the Jews." He also noted: "No Roman Catholic approves of the persecutions of Jews in Germany". His praise for the Jewish people for having "exhibited the noblest religious values", comforted some and outraged others. The packed sermons had been attended by both Protestants and Jews, as well as Catholics, and "Munich rabbi Leo Baerwald was encouraged by the sermons, even though the cardinal had neither commented on Nazi antisemitism nor broken with the ancient Christian idea of a curse on the Jewish people".

Faulhaber's sermons were published week by week during Advent by A. Huber, Munich. The book of sermons was subsequently banned by the Nazis.

=== Faulhaber on persecution of Jews ===
In a letter to Pacelli in the early 1930s, Faulhaber referred to the Nazi persecution of Jews as "unjust and painful". Historian Michael Phayer notes that unlike some clerics in Hungary and Croatia, "most German bishops were not mean-spirited toward Jews", and Faulhaber exhibited "typical Christian antisemitism, but it was not Nazi antisemitism". Phayer noted that Faulhaber did not condone Nazi antisemitism, as he was the primary drafter of Mit Brennender Sorge which denounced racism.

In November 1941, a small group of German Catholic bishops drafted a pastoral letter that proposed to protest against hostile measures taken against the church by the Nazi regime. The proposed letter didn't mention the Jews. Saul Friedländer sees this lack of willingness to take a public stand to the growing awareness of the mass exterminations in the East as being calculated because Faulhaber recorded in a memo his thoughts as to the proposed letter contents and his belief that raising "the Jewish question" and other matters would hurt the reputation of the German people and its government.

In his New Year's Eve sermon in 1938, Faulhaber commented: "That is one advantage of our time; in the highest office of the Reich we have the example of a simple and modest alcohol-and-nicotine-free way of life". Also in 1938 the Nazis raided and turned upside down Faulhaber's office. During Kristallnacht Faulhaber provided the Chief Rabbi of Munich a truck to save the synagogue's possessions before it was destroyed. Pinchas Lapide opined that Faulhaber "preached half-heartedly against the desecration of Jewish prayer-houses" and objects that the truck was only provided at the behest of the pope. Martin Rhonheimer, who, although he notes that Faulhaber "had long been known as a friend of the Jews", wrote of Faulhaber's Advent sermons: "It is clear that Faulhaber's steadfast opposition to Nazi racial theories was never intended as a defence of post-Christian Jewry or of his Jewish fellow citizens against their persecutors." Despite Rhonheimer and Lapide's objection to the speeches as half-hearted, they nonetheless resulted in the arrival of uniformed Nazis at Faulhaber's home, shouting "Take the traitor to Dachau!" and breaking his shutters and window frames.

=== Racial theory ===
The writer Sidney Ehler has written that Faulhaber's series of sermons, in December 1933, condemned "the fundamental errors contained in the racial theory and its 'German Christian' offshoot". And Ronald Rychlak has averred that Faulhaber defended the principles of racial tolerance and instructed Germans to respect Judaism. The Nazis took objection to these sermons and his palace was fired upon. Martin Niemöller, the Protestant clergyman who spent seven years in concentration camps for resistance, said Faulhaber's sermons demonstrated that he was a "great and courageous man".

Some historians, while granting that Faulhaber objected to Nazi racism, assert that he insufficiently objected to antisemitism, asserting that he merely defended Judaism and the Old Testament, not sufficiently Jews themselves. Such historians have noted qualifying comments in his sermons regarding the acceptability of a "community of blood": "Blood and race... have participated in the shaping of German history". In August 1934, the Prague Socialist newspaper Sozialdemokrat carried what Pinchas Lapide considers a mistaken report that Faulhaber had preached against racism which was copied by several Swiss newspapers. Lapide says Faulhaber immediately cabled the newspaper Basler Nationalzeitung "Faulhaber sermon against racism never held. Request denial of false report". On the following day he wrote to Hitler's Minister of the Interior:

It is urgent that the public sale of such a heinous article, which is based on a Marxist forgery, be forbidden by the police and that the public be swiftly enlightened about this shameless lie.

Lapide also notes, when the World Jewish Congress heard of the supposed preaching of Faulhaber they sent a communication to him thanking him for his courageous words. Faulhaber wrote back to them "protesting vigorously against the very mention of his name at a conference which demands a commercial boycott against Germany".

According to Ronald Rychlak the Nazis called for Faulhaber to be killed in 1935 and in 1936 Nazi police seised and destroyed one of his sermons, and did the same two times in 1937.

Faulhaber was a major contributor to the only Papal encyclical ever written in German (in the hopes of having a greater impact on the offenders), Mit brennender Sorge. Faulhaber spent three nights working a draft which condemned the Nazi's idolisation of race and state. The encyclical sought to undercut the Nazi's attempt to alter Christianity to support racism: "The culmination of Revelation in the Gospel of Jesus Christ is final, is binding forever. This revelation has no room for addenda made by human hand, still less for an ersatz or substitute religion based on arbitrary revelations, which some contemporary advocates wish to derive from the so-called myth of blood and race." One historian praised Faulhaber as "one of the most fearless" German churchmen who in pastoral letters and sermons "denounced in no uncertain terms the treatment of Jews, the theories of German christians, and various actions of the Nazis" and that he noted the "debt of Christianity to the Jews".

Rabbi David G. Dalin has described him as "a famous opponent of the Nazis". One historian of modern Germany described him as "the most articulate anti-Nazi in the Catholic hierarchy". Rabbi Stephen S. Wise, a noted American voice for the Jewish cause during the war, called Faulhaber "a true Christian prelate", saying he tried to protect Jews when he "had lifted his fearless voice".

=== Relations with Hitler ===
Faulhaber, like other members of the German Catholic hierarchy, desired to have "a working relationship with [–] government and found it difficult to believe when Hitler used them for his own propaganda purposes and then abandoned them with empty promises".

Pinchas Lapide wrote that Faulhaber, in common with virtually all the German episcopacy, assured Hitler of their sincere cooperation. On 24 April 1933, the Premier reported to the Bavarian Council of Ministers that Faulhaber had issued an order to the clergy to support the new Nazi regime in which Faulhaber had confidence. On 12 March 1933, Faulhaber was received by Pope Pius XI in Rome. On his return, he reported:

After my recent experience in Rome in the highest circles, which I cannot reveal here, I must say that I found, despite everything, a greater tolerance with regard to the new government. [...] Let us meditate on the words of the Holy Father, who in a consistory, without mentioning his name, indicated before the whole world in Adolf Hitler the statesman who first, after the Pope himself, has raised his voice against Bolshevism

After the signing of the Concordat between Germany and the Holy See in 1933 Faulhaber sent a note of congratulations to Hitler:

What the old parliaments and parties did not accomplish in 60 years, your statesmanlike foresight has achieved in six months. For Germany's prestige in East and West and before the whole world this handshake with the Papacy, the greatest moral power in the history of the world, is feat of immeasurable blessing.

Faulhaber ended his note with a wish "coming from the bottom of my heart: May God preserve the Reich Chancellor for our people."

In June 1936, the German press reported the case of a Swiss Catholic who prayed for the death of Hitler and by extension accused all Catholics of sharing a similar inclination towards sedition. Faulhaber responded in a sermon: "A lunatic abroad has had an attack of madness – does this justify wholesale suspicion of the German Catholics? You are all witnesses for the fact that on all Sundays and holidays at the main service, we pray in all churches for the Führer as we have promised in the Concordat. And now one can read in big letters of the papers at the street corners, "They pray for Hitler's death!" We feel offended on account of this questioning of our loyalty to the state. We will today give an answer, a Christian answer: Catholic men, we will now pray together a paternoster for the life of the Führer. This is our answer".

After the failed assassination attempt by Georg Elser, he held a solemn mass celebrating Hitler's escape.

=== Faulhaber meets Hitler near Berchtesgaden, November 1936 ===
In August 1936, the German bishops met for their annual conference, at Fulda. Discussion of the Spanish Civil War dominated the proceedings. The German bishops fundamentally accepted the Nazi presentation of the role of Bolsheviks in this war – Goebbels's propaganda ministry instructed reporters to call the Republicans simply the Bolsheviks, and in a letter the joint episcopacy stated; "German unity should not be sacrificed to religious antagonism, quarrels, contempt and struggles. Rather our national power of resistance must be increased and strengthened so that not only may Europe be freed from Bolshevism by us, but also that the whole civilized world may be indebted to us."

Nuncio Cesare Orsenigo arranged for Faulhaber to have a private meeting with Hitler. On 4 November 1936, Faulhaber travelled to Hitler's mountain retreat near Berchtesgaden. According to Michael Burleigh's account of this meeting, Hitler dominated the conversation, expressing his disappointment in the Church's response to Nazi actions and dismissing the Reich's attacks on the Church – the meeting sputtering out in a reciprocal lack of understanding. Historian Beth Griech-Polelle however, delivers a quite different account in which, following Faulhaber's own account, early tension eased as the meeting progressed and when Hitler had argued his goal was to protect the German people from congenitally afflicted criminals such as now wreak havoc in Spain, Faulhaber had immediately replied: "The Church, Mr Chancellor, will not refuse the state the right to keep those pests away from the national community within the framework of moral law."

In his notes on the November 1936 meeting Faulhaber recorded that Hitler "spoke openly, confidentially, emotionally, at times in a spiritual way he lashed out at Bolshevism and at the Jews" saying "How the sub-humans, incited by the Jews, created havoc in Spain like beasts". Faulhaber noted "On this, he was well informed. ... He would not miss the historical moment". Faulhaber recalled to Hitler how he had been present when Pope Pius XI said that Hitler was the first statesman who had agreed with the Pope about the danger of Bolshevism. Friedländer comments that Faulhaber seemed to agree with Hitler's points by noting Faulhaber's comments "All of this was expressed by Hitler in a moving way in his great speech at the Nuremberg Party rally". Hitler discussed with Faulhaber tensions between the Church and Party:

Think about all this, Cardinal, and consult with other leaders of the Church how you can support the great undertaking of National Socialism to prevent the victory of Bolshevism and how you can achieve a peaceful relationship to the state. Either National Socialism and the church are both victorious or they perish together. Rest assured, I shall do away with all these small things that stand in the way of a harmonious co-operation. ... I do not wish to engage in horse trading. You know I am opposed to compromises, but let this be a last attempt.

Faulhaber left the meeting convinced that "Hitler was deeply religious" and that "The Reich Chancellor undoubtedly lives in belief in God. ... He recognises Christianity as the builder of Western culture." Some modern critics have painted the meeting as a failure on Faulhaber's part with regard to Jews. Michael Phayer, however, notes that Saul Friedländer, based on the what Phayer calls the "distorted" work of Ernst Klee, "tenuously links" Faulhaber with Nazi racism, but his own analysis of the text of Faulhaber's notes of the meeting leads him to reject this suggestion. Phayer observes that the meeting was not about Jews but about church-state relations.

On 18 November, Faulhaber met with leading members of the German hierarchy of cardinals to ask them to warn their parishioners against the errors of communism. On 19 November, Pius XI announced that communism had moved to the head of the list of "errors" and that a clear statement was needed. On 25 November, Faulhaber informed the Bavarian bishops that he had promised Hitler that the bishops would issue a new pastoral letter in which they condemned "Bolshevism which represents the greatest danger for the peace of Europe and the Christian civilization of our country". In addition, Faulhaber stated, the pastoral letter "will once again affirm our loyalty and positive attitude, demanded by the Fourth Commandment, toward today's form of government and the Führer".

When the timetable for this announcement fell through – suppressed for its reference to state violations against the Reich-Vatican Concordat – Faulhaber set to work on another draft that he submitted to the German bishops. On 24 December 1936, the German joint hierarchy ordered its priests to read the pastoral letter entitled On the Defense against Bolshevism, from all their pulpits on 3 January 1937. The letter pointed out that the Church's support for the Nazi battle against Bolshevism would be more effective if the Church were to enjoy the freedoms guaranteed by divine law and the Concordat. Lewy asserts that the letter fulfilled the bishops' share of the bargain made with Hitler by declaring their support for Hitler's foreign policy and by encouraging the Catholic laity to have confidence in Hitler's leadership. However, Hitler never kept his part of the "quid pro quo" as the Nazis were unsympathetic to the Church's desire for Catholic organisations and schools outside the direct control of the Nazis.

"The pastoral letter's text revealed the capitulation of Faulhaber to Hitler's wishes: "Bolshevism has begun its march from Russia to the countries of Europe. ... the fateful hour has come for our nation and for the Christian culture of the Western world. ... the Führer and Chancellor Adolf Hitler saw the march of Bolshevism from afar and turned his mind and energies towards averting this enormous danger. The German bishops consider it their duty to do their utmost to support the leader of the Reich with every available means in this defense". The bishops also warned Catholics they should not fall into discontent, as "such a mood has always provided fertile soil for Bolshevik sentiments".

He also notes Faulhaber's remarks to the German bishops that the comments of "emigrants" regarding this pastoral letter were of no consequence ("we do not care a rap") and that they all knew who the "emigrants" referred to were. In Lewy's opinion, Faulhaber is referring to Catholics who had left Germany. The Dutch Catholic newspaper "Der Deutsche Weg" expressed disappointment of the pastoral letter: "We find it hard to understand that despite the events of 30 June [i.e. Night of the Long Knives], despite the inhuman brutalities perpetrated in concentration camps, despite the currency and defamation trials, despite the personal insults against individual princes of the Church, against the Holy Father [i.e., the Pope] and the entire Church, and in spite of all the hostile measures amounting to another Kulturkampf, ... the bishops find words of appreciation for what (next to Bolshevism) is their worst enemy".

The French Catholic anti-Nazi newspaper Kulturkampf asserted that "if the Nazis would only stop their attacks against the Church, National socialism and the German Catholics could again be allies. Paul Johnson describes Faulhaber as sharing in a common illusion of German Christians of a distinction between the Führer, whom he thought was well intentioned, and a certain number of Hitler's "evil associates".

After a plot had been uncovered to assassinate Hitler in 1943 Faulhaber was questioned by the Gestapo over his contacts with Carl Goerdeler who was involved with the generals' plan. He was said to have vigorously condemned the assassination plot and to have affirmed his loyalty to the Führer.

=== Opposition to Nazi policies ===
In June 1933, Faulhaber complained to Hitler about acts of violence against Catholic journeymen that had taken place in Munich and the arrest of almost one hundred priests. He protested that the religious freedom of the church could be threatened by such acts even though the Church had made public expressions of loyalty to the state and a willingness to participate in it. Later in the year he complained also to the Bavarian State Chancellery about curbs introduced by the new regime. In June 1937, he condemned the arrest of the Jesuit priest Rupert Mayer during a sermon. The Catholic Church opposed then, as now, sterilisation. When the Nazis proposed introducing compulsory sterilisation of people afflicted with certain diseases or disabilities in January 1934 he again protested. The German Bishops asked that Catholics in relevant occupations should not be forced to act against their conscience and Church teachings. The Nazis were hostile to the perceived criticism of the German bishops and accused them of encouraging disobedience. Faulhaber responded by asserting:

The bishops repeatedly and in no uncertain terms have declared their willingness to promote the peaceful cooperation of the Church and State. However, in those questions where a law of state conflicts with an eternal command of God, the bishops cannot through silence betray their holy office.

In September 1939, Hitler issued an order that sanctioned the killing of people with incurable diseases. Euthanasia was, and still is, against Church teaching. The program was started in secret but when word leaked out Faulhaber was one of the German bishops who protested at the killings and wrote to Minister of Justice:

I have deemed it my duty of conscience to speak out in this ethico-legal, non-political question, for as a Catholic bishop I may not remain silent when the preservation of the moral foundations of all public order is at stake.

In April 1941, the Nazis proposed the removal of crucifixes from classrooms that resulted in an eruption of civil disobedience by ordinary Catholics that led to the dropping of the ban. During the course of the disturbances Faulhaber added his criticism of the ban: "The German soldier is honoured publicly by being called a crusader against Bolshevism. This title of honour would not be deserved if at the same time at home war is declared".

=== Annexation of Austria ===
In March 1938, the Nazis crossed the Austrian frontier and Austria was declared a province of the German Reich. Previously Faulhaber had thought the ringing of Church bells for purely political reasons was not to be encouraged and he refused to order a peal of bells on the eve of the plebiscite in March 1936. (In February 1919 he had refused to allow the ringing of bells after Kurt Eisner, the Socialist Prime Minister of Bavaria, had been assassinated by a Catholic nobleman). In the aftermath of the Anschluss, Faulhaber recommended the issuing of a statement ordering the ringing of bells in Catholic Churches and exhorting the faithful on 10 April "in this hour of world historical significance, to pledge their fidelity to the Führer and Chancellor of the Reich, Adolf Hitler, and to pray for the peaceful cooperation of Church and State in the Greater German Reich". The bells were rung but the Bishops of Bavaria along with others omitted mention of Hitler.

=== Invasion of Czechoslovakia ===
In October 1938, the Nazis crossed the border into Czechoslovakia and occupied the Sudetenland. Sharing in the widespread relief that war had now been averted Faulhaber suggested sending a telegram, in the name of the German Bishops Conference, to Hitler. Signed by Bertram it read:

The great deed of safeguarding international peace moves the German episcopate, acting in the name of all Catholics of all the German dioceses, respectfully to tender congratulations and thanks and to order a festive peal of bells on Sunday.

In 1944 Pope Pius XII wrote to Faulhaber indicating that in the event of a negotiated peace, Germany should not have to give up Austria and the Sudeten province of Czechoslovakia.

=== War with the Soviet Union ===
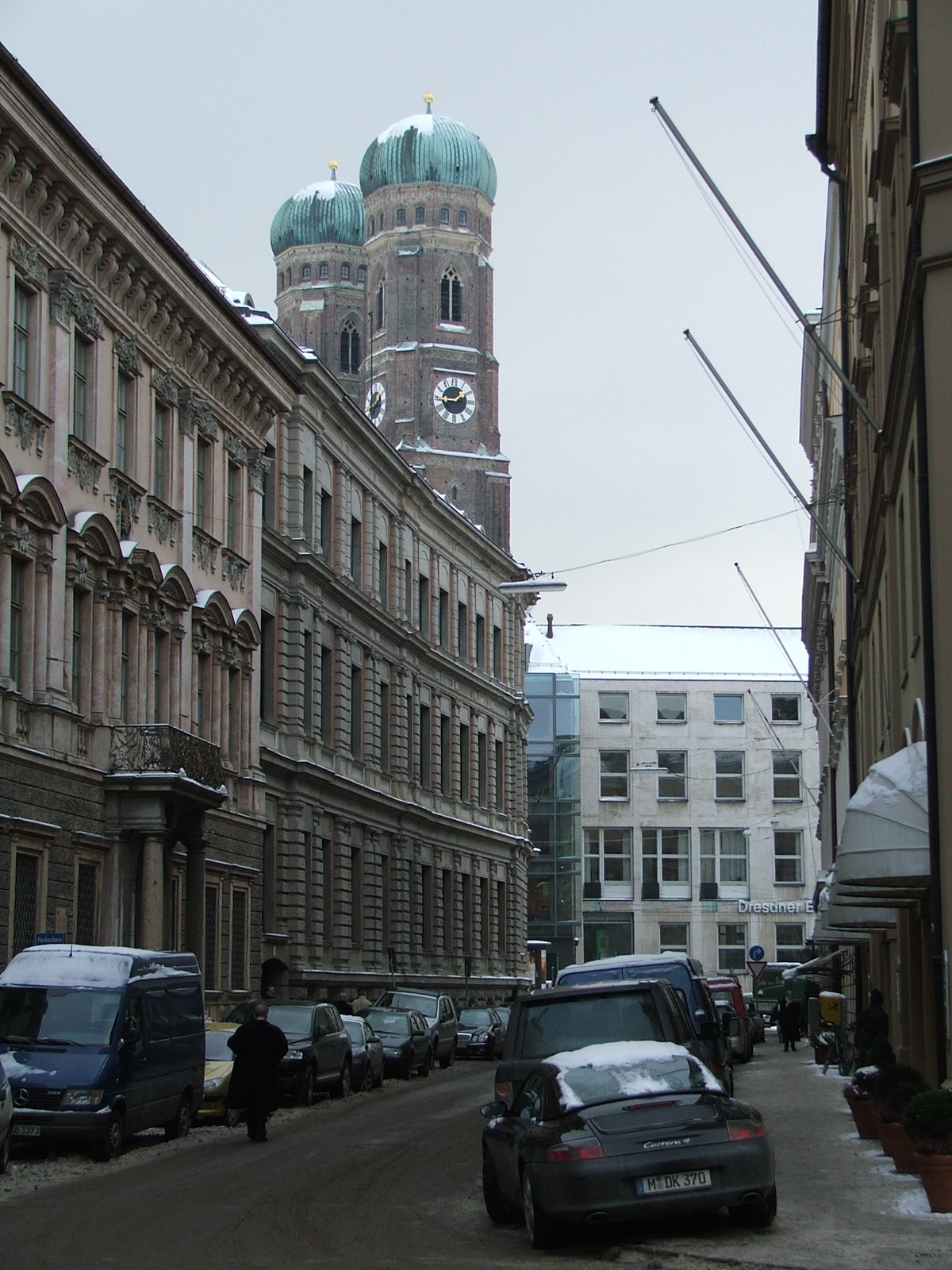
Street named in his honour Kardinal-Faulhaber-Straße, in Munich. In the background is the Frauenkirche, Munich cathedral.

In June 1941, the Nazis launched their attack on the Soviet Union which solidified the support of the episcopate for the struggle against Bolshevism and in one instance earned the praise of Reinhard Heydrich. The confiscation of Church bells as part of the war effort was met by Faulhaber with: "For the dear fatherland we will make also this sacrifice if now it has become necessary for a successful end of the war and for the defeat of Bolshevism." As the war in the East turned against the Nazis Faulhaber defended the Church against the Nazi charge that it had become lukewarm towards the cause:

Nobody in his heart can possibly wish for an unsuccessful outcome of the war. Every reasonable person knows that in such a case the State and the Church, and organised society altogether, would be overturned by the Russian chaos.

=== Negotiating the concordat ===
Faulhaber was also involved with Cardinal Pacelli in the negotiations of the Reichskonkordat which was signed on 20 July 1933 and ratified in September of that year. It was typical policy of the church to sign concordats with the nations of Europe and the church had signed dozens of treaties with all sorts of European nations in the decades prior. The concordat also sought protection for Catholics when the influence of their traditional protector, the Centre Party, had waned (the party was established when Pius IX was Pope to defend Catholics during Chancellor Otto von Bismarck's anti-Catholic program, the Kulturkampf, but by the time of signing of the concordat the party had lost influence and had been dissolved even before the signing). Paul Johnson's opinion was that the Kulturkampf had left the German episcopate in a state of fear of once again being considered anti-German and this had encouraged the church to come to an agreement with Hitler. Even before the rise of Hitler he believes this attitude was demonstrated by Faulhaber when the Cardinal tried to excel in patriotic rhetoric by describing the First World War as having been undertaken in order to avenge the murder in Sarajevo, believing that it would enter the annals of Christian ethics as "the prototype of the just war". According to Ronald Rychlak, Faulhaber was of the opinion that Hitler wanted a concordat with the Vatican for propaganda purposes and counselled caution as Hitler "sees what a halo his government will have in the eyes of the world if the Pope makes a treaty with him" nor would German Catholics understand why they had entered into such an agreement when "a whole row of Catholic officials are sitting in prison".

Faulhaber and Pacelli sought through the concordat to gain a strategic and legal basis to challenge violent repression of the church, in part for its condemnations of Nazi racial doctrine. The German hierarchy was wary of the precariousness of deals with the government, Faulhaber observing, "With the concordat we are hanged, without the concordat we are hanged, drawn and quartered". Pacelli is reported to have told the British ambassador to the Holy See: "I had to choose between an agreement and the virtual elimination of the Catholic Church in the Reich". He felt that "a pistol had been held to his head" and he was negotiating "with the devil himself". On 24 July, Faulhaber sent a handwritten letter to Hitler, noting that "For Germany's prestige in the East and the West and before the whole world, this handshake with the papacy, the greatest moral power in the history of the world, is a feat of immeasurable importance." In a sermon given in Munich during 1937, Faulhaber declared: "At a time when the heads of the major nations in the world faced the new Germany with reserve and considerable suspicion, the Catholic Church, the greatest moral power on earth, through the Concordat, expressed its confidence in the new German government. This was a deed of immeasurable significance for the reputation of the new government abroad.;

After the conclusion of the concordat, Faulhaber coupled his comments regarding the agreement with his expectation that the German state would comply with it and, as historian Michael Burleigh writes, with an appeal for amnesty for victims in concentration camps – an appeal which Burleigh points out is not noted by Faulhaber's modern-day critics.

The bishops of Austria, Hitler's country of birth, but outside the control of Nazi repression at that time, publicly expressed their view of the concordat, Nazism, and the situation in Germany in a letter of 23 December 1933: "The Concordat recently concluded between the Holy See and Germany does not mean that the Catholic Church approves of the religious errors of Nazism. Everybody knows how tense is the situation between the Church and State in Germany... The Catholic Church has never agreed with the three fundamental errors of Nazism, which are first, race madness, second, violent anti-Semitism, and third extreme nationalism". The Austrian bishops' letter, The New York Times noted, "is regarded as a challenge to national-socialism not only in Austria but also in Germany".

In 1933 Faulhaber implicitly criticized the violent character of the new Nazi leadership by declaring: "A state based on right, which strives from the first for a peaceful solution, must win the victory over a state based on might, which seeks to gain right with bloody weapons". The speech was widely considered an act of opposition against Hitler's rule.

In his Advent 1933 sermon, Faulhaber preached: "Let us not forget that we were saved not by German blood but by the blood of Christ!" in response to Nazi racism. The SS interpreted the sermon as an intervention in favour of the Jews.

In 1934 an unknown person fired two shots at the cardinal's study. In 1935 some Nazis called for the killing of Faulhaber during a public meeting. In 1949 the council of the Landesverband der Israelitischen Kultusgemeinde in Bayern (Regional Union of Israelitic [Jewish] Communities in Bavaria) thanked Faulhaber with the following words:

As representatives of the Bavarian Jewish synagogues, we will never forget how you, honourable Mister Cardinal, in the years after 1933, with unseen courage, have defended the ethics of the Old Testament from your pulpits, and how you saved thousands of Jewish persons from terror and lethal violence.

Catholic historians and publicists have sought to stress Faulhaber's actions as a committed anti-Nazi and regime critic. However, certain other critics have alleged his collusion. In 2017 the liberal secularist free thought association Bund für Geistesfreiheit of Munich, in an open letter demanding the renaming of the Kardinal-Faulhaber-Strasse, called it unbearable that von Faulhaber should still be honoured with a street name. According to the association, in a September 1933 diary entry Faulhaber had written that he hoped Hitler would succeed in doing what Bismarck had failed to do and "eradicate the evil of the parliamentary democratic system". The freethinkers' open letter cited Faulhaber's "hatred of Kurt Eisner" of the Independent Social Democratic Party while alleging Faulhaber's in 1936 extended to the Nazi regime a "right" to "take action against the excesses of Judaism in his area", his proclamation in 1936 of "the unanimous commitment of the German bishops to the Fuehrer and his world historical work" and his 1938 call for Catholics "to make a vow of allegiance to the Fuehrer in this hour of world history".

== Views on Communism ==
Cardinal Faulhaber had preached against communism in 1919, 1930 and from 1935 until about late 1941, but was silent on the topic from late 1942 until 1945; after the end of the war, he continued his public denouncement against Bolshevism; the ideology which ruled over the Soviet Union and which Vladimir Lenin and Joseph Stalin was attempting to spread to all of Europe through the Communist International.

== Postwar ==
Styles of Michael von Faulhaber
- Reference style: His Eminence
- Spoken style: Your Eminence
- Religious style: Cardinal
- Informal style: Cardinal
- See: Munich

After the war, Faulhaber pleaded for Father Jozef Tiso, the president of the Slovak People's Party, which had actively persecuted Jews in 1941 and in 1944. Faulhaber described Tiso as a "prelate in good standing". Tiso was hanged for war crimes and Vatican Radio refused to defend Tiso: "There are certain laws that must be obeyed no matter how much one loves his country". Michael Phayer blames Faulhaber's mistake on the failure of the Vatican to keep its prelates informed and described it as a "dead end for information about genocide".

After the war, the German Bishops Conference issued a statement that many Germans, including Catholics, had committed war crimes. The most controversial section dealing with the issue of personal or collective guilt for the Holocaust caused a rift between the predominantly Catholic population of southern Germany and the Occupational Military Government-United States, the latter of which censored the bishops' letter. Faulhaber refused to publish a censored version. Faulhaber also said that German Jews should be welcomed back to the country as they belonged there just as much as any other Germans, and he offered to pay for their transportation costs to Germany from Theresienstadt. Faulhaber received expressions of gratitude from the Jewish Community Centre, who noted his well-meaning attitude shown to Jews in Munich during the years of persecution. Faulhaber called antisemitism a scourge of mankind and gave the assurance to an Anglo-American group "that I will do all in my power to convince the Roman Catholics of Bavaria that they must tear out all remaining anti-Semitism from their hearts". He said he would ask the Pope to issue a pastoral letter on antisemitism. Michael Phayer is of the opinion that in practice Faulhaber, along with Cardinal Preysing, accomplished "little or nothing" of significance in attacking antisemitism because of the priorities of the Vatican and the envoy of Pope Pius XII, Bishop Aloisius Joseph Muench.

Faulhaber sharply criticized the American, British and Soviet military occupation authorities for attempting to secularise, liberalise and modernise the German and Austrian school systems.

== Legacy ==
Different groups of people argue over Faulhaber's legacy. At the time, the Nazis reportedly considered Faulhaber a "friend of the Jews" and a Catholic "reactionary" (the term used by the Nazis to refer to individuals, especially traditionalist Christians, who did not accept the innovation of the scientific racism of Nazi antisemitism, criticised supposed pagan elements in the ideology, but were not left-wing). Ronald Rychlak is of the opinion that the views expressed by people such as Faulhaber to Cardinal Pacelli (counselling silence on the assumption that speaking out would make matters worse) influenced Cardinal Pacelli's future responses to issues.

The topic has been raised in post-war sociopolitics between Catholics and Jews. In "We Remember - A Reflection of the Shoah", a declaration issued by the Vatican in 1998 under Pope John Paul II's Papacy, Faulhaber's Advent sermons of 1933 were praised for their rejection of "Nazi anti-Semitic propaganda". The principal author of the document was Cardinal Edward Cassidy, an Australian. At a meeting in 1999, a Jewish Rabbi, who as a sixteen-year-old lived in Munich at the time of the Advent sermons, recalled that Faulhaber had upheld the normative position of the Catholic Church "that with the coming of Christ, Jews and Judaism have lost their place in the world". The Rabbi and some American historians at the meeting said that Faulhaber himself said he had only been defending the "Old Testament" and pre-Christian Jews, thus rejecting the race-based nature of Nazi antisemitism, not endorsing Rabbinic Judaism as valid. James Carroll, an American who authored the work Constantine's Sword, reported that Cardinal Cassidy seemed embarrassed and replied that the disputed assertion in "We Remember" had not been in his original document but had been added "by historians".

== Awards and decorations ==
- Grand Cross of Merit of the Federal Republic of Germany (1951)
- Knight of the Order of Saint Hubert
- Iron Cross of 1914, 2nd class
- Military Merit Order, 1st class (Bavaria)
- Order of St. Alexander (Bulgaria)

== Notes and references ==
=== Works cited ===
- Nazi Germany and the Jews, Saul Friedländer, 1997, Weidenfeld and Nicolson, ISBN 0-297-81882-1
- The Years of Extermination: Nazi Germany and the Jews, 1939-1945, Saul Friedländer, 2007, Weidenfeld and Nicolson, ISBN 978-0-297-81877-9
- The Catholic Church and Nazi Germany, Guenter Lewy, 1964, Weidenfeld and Nicolson
- Lewy, Guenter (2000), The Catholic Church and Nazi Germany, New York, Da Capo Press ISBN 0-306-80931-1 Amazon Books, retrieved 8 May 2005.
- Three Popes and the Jews, Pinchas Lapide, 1967, Hawthorn Books
- Phayer, Michael (2000). The Catholic Church and the Holocaust - 1930–1965. Indiana University Press. ISBN 0-253-33725-9.
- Rhonheimer, Martin (November 2003). "The Holocaust - What Was Not Said". First Things Magazine. Archived from the original on 16 October 2009.
- A History of Christianity, Paul Johnson, 1976, Athenium ISBN 0-689-70591-3
- Hitler the War and the Pope, Ronald J. Rychlak, 2000, Our Sunday Visitor ISBN 0-87973-217-2

Catholic Church titles
| Preceded by Franziskus von Bettinger | Archbishop of Munich and Freising; 1917 – 1952 | Succeeded by Joseph Wendel |
