= Antonius von Steichele =

Catholic bishop (1816–1889)

- Archbishop of Munich and Freising
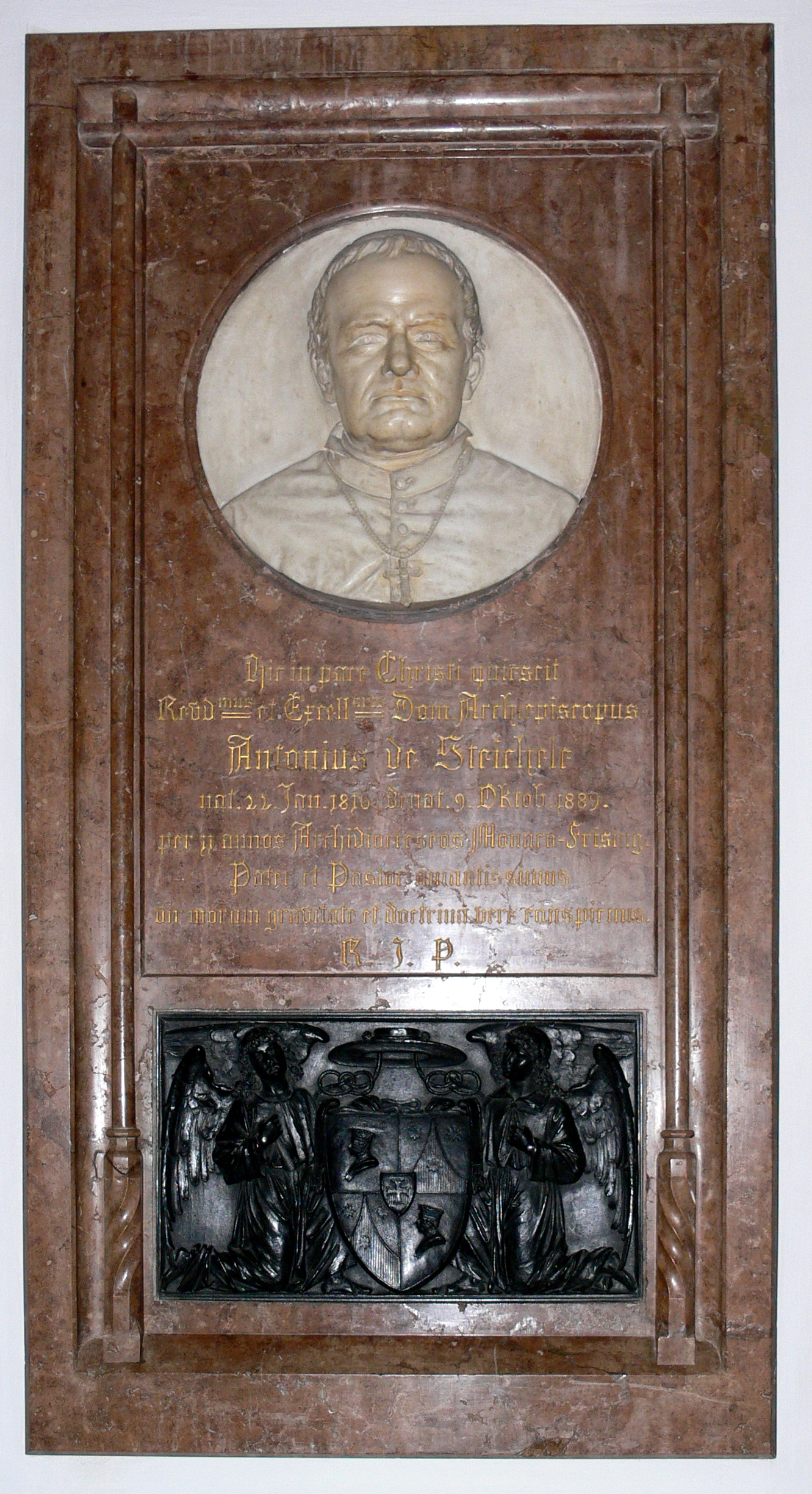
- Archdiocese: Munich and Freising
- See: Munich and Freising
- Appointed: 30 April 1878
- Installed: 13 October 1878
- Term ended: 9 October 1889
- Predecessor: Gregor von Scherr
- Successor: Antonius von Thoma

Orders
- Ordination: 28 August 1838
- Consecration: 13 October 1878 by Pankratius von Dinkel

Personal details
- Born: 22 January 1816 Mertingen
- Died: 9 October 1889 (aged 73)
- Denomination: Roman Catholic
- Coat of arms

Antonius von Steichele (22 January 1816 – 9 October 1889) was Bishop, and later Archbishop of the Archdiocese of Munich and Freising from 1878 until 1889.

== Biography ==
Born 22 January 1816 in Mertingen, he was ordained on 28 August 1838, aged 22 in Augsburg, Germany by Bishop Pankratius von Dinkel.

On 30 April 1878, aged 62, he was appointed Archbishop of the Archdiocese of Munich and Freising, confirmed three months later and installed accordingly.

On 9 October 1889, aged 73, he died. He had been a priest for 51 years and a bishop for 11 years.

Catholic Church titles
Preceded by Gregor Leonhard Andreas von Scherr	Archbishop of Munich; 1878–1889	Succeeded by Antonius von Thoma
