= Karl-August von Reisach =

Catholic cardinal

His Eminence Karl-Auguste von Reisach
- Cardinal, Archbishop of Munich and Freising
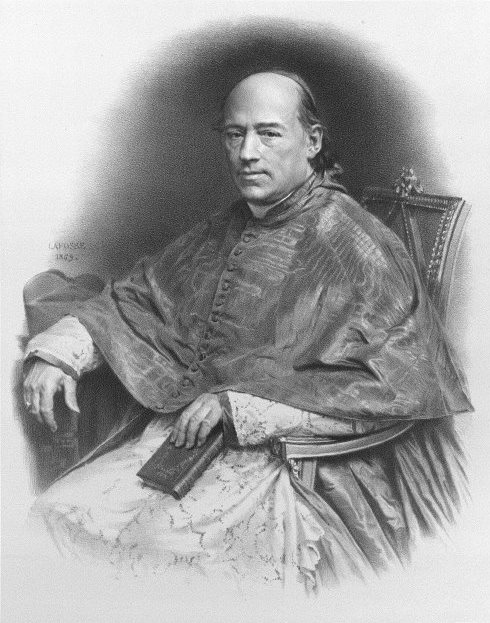
- Archdiocese: Munich and Freising
- See: Munich and Freising
- Appointed: 12 July 1841 (Coadjutor)
- Installed: 25 January 1847
- Term ended: 19 June 1856
- Predecessor: Lothar Anselm von Gebsattel
- Successor: Gregor von Scherr
- Other posts: Cardinal-Priest of Sant’Anastasia; Cardinal-Bishop of Sabina; Official of the Roman Curia
- Previous post: Bishop of Eichstätt (1836–1841)

Orders
- Ordination: 10 August 1828
- Consecration: 17 July 1836 by Pope Gregory XVI
- Created cardinal: 17 December 1855 by Pope Pius IX
- Rank: Cardinal-Bishop

Personal details
- Born: 6 July 1800 Roth
- Died: 22 December 1869 (aged 69)
- Denomination: Roman Catholic
- Coat of arms

Karl-Auguste Graf von Reisach (7 July 1800, in Roth, Bavaria – 22 December 1869, in the Redemptorist monastery of Contamine, France) was a Roman Catholic German theologian, Cardinal and the former Archbishop of Munich and Freising. He was titled as Count of Reisach before his priestly ordination.

Pope Pius IX delegated von Reisach to crown the venerated image of Our Lady of Luxembourg via decree in his name on 2 July 1866.

== Education ==
On the completion of his secular studies in Neuburg an der Donau, he studied philosophy at Munich (1816), and jurisprudence at Heidelberg, Göttingen, and Landshut, securing (1821) the Degree of Doctor Juris Utriusque. Devoting himself a little later to the study of theology, he received minor orders at Innsbruck in 1824, was ordained in 1828 after philosophical and theological studies in the German College at Rome, and in the following year graduated Doctor of Theology.

== Service in Rome ==
Pope Pius VII appointed him rector of studies at the Sacred Congregation for the Propagation of the Faith, an office which brought him into close relations with its prefect, Cardinal-Priest Bartolomeo Cappellari, who later became Pope Gregory XVI.

Urged to devote special attention to the affairs of the Catholic Church in Germany, he attacked the current anti-ecclesiastical views and tendencies, especially with regard to mixed marriages, in his work Was haben wir von den Reformatoren und Stimmführen des katholischen Deutschland unserer Tage zu halten?, which appeared at Mainz in 1835 under the pseudonym Athanasius Sincerus Philalethes.

== Return to Germany ==
In 1836 he became Bishop of Eichstätt (Bavaria) and, by the foundation of the boys' seminary (1838) and the erection of the lyceum (1843), rendered the greatest services to the ecclesiastical life of the diocese. As delegate of the pope and the Kings of Prussia and Bavaria, he mediated in the Prussian ecclesiastical dispute, and the rapid settlement of the Cologne muddle (Kölner Wirren - see Clemens August von Droste-Vischering) was due primarily to him.

== Vatican service ==
In recognition of his services, he was named Coadjutor in 1841, and Archbishop of Munich-Freising in 1847 . His zeal on behalf of the Church having rendered him unpleasing to the Government, he was, at the request of King Maximilian II of Bavaria, summoned to Rome by Pope Pius IX as Cardinal-Priest, with the title of St. Anastasia.

He conducted the concordat negotiations with Württemberg and Baden and took a prominent part in the preparations for the council.

Reisach was also appointed to the following positions:

1867

- President of the Congregation of Ecclesiastico-political Affairs
- Camerlengo of the Sacred College of Cardinals

1868

- Cardinal-Bishop of Sabina

1869

- First legate of the council
- Consultor of the Congregation for the Index
- President (Prefect) of the Congregation Responsible for the reform of the liturgical books and the ecclesiastical canons of the Eastern Churches (predecessor of the current Dicastery for the Eastern Churches)
- Consultor to Congregation for Extraordinary Ecclesiastical Affairs
- Consultor to the Examination of Bishops
- Member of the Congregation of the Propaganda and the Congregation of Sacred Rites
- Minister of Education for the Papal States

Catholic Church titles
Preceded by Lothar von Gebsattel	Archbishop of Munich; 1846–1856	Succeeded by Gregor von Scherr
Preceded by Angelo Mai	Cardinal Priest of Santa Anastasia; 1855–1868	Succeeded by Luigi Oreglia di Santo Stefano
Preceded by Giovanni Brunelli	Cardinal Priest of Santa Cecilia; 1861–1868	Succeeded by Innocenzo Ferrieri
Preceded by Girolamo D'Andrea	Cardinal Bishop of Sabina; 1868–1869	Succeeded by Giuseppe Milesi Pironi Ferretti
Preceded by Camillo di Pietro	Camerlengo of the Sacred College of Cardinals; 1867–1868	Succeeded by Alessandro Barnabò
