= Leo Lösch von Hilkertshausen =

Prince-Bishop of Freising from 1552 to 1559

- Prince-Bishop of Freising
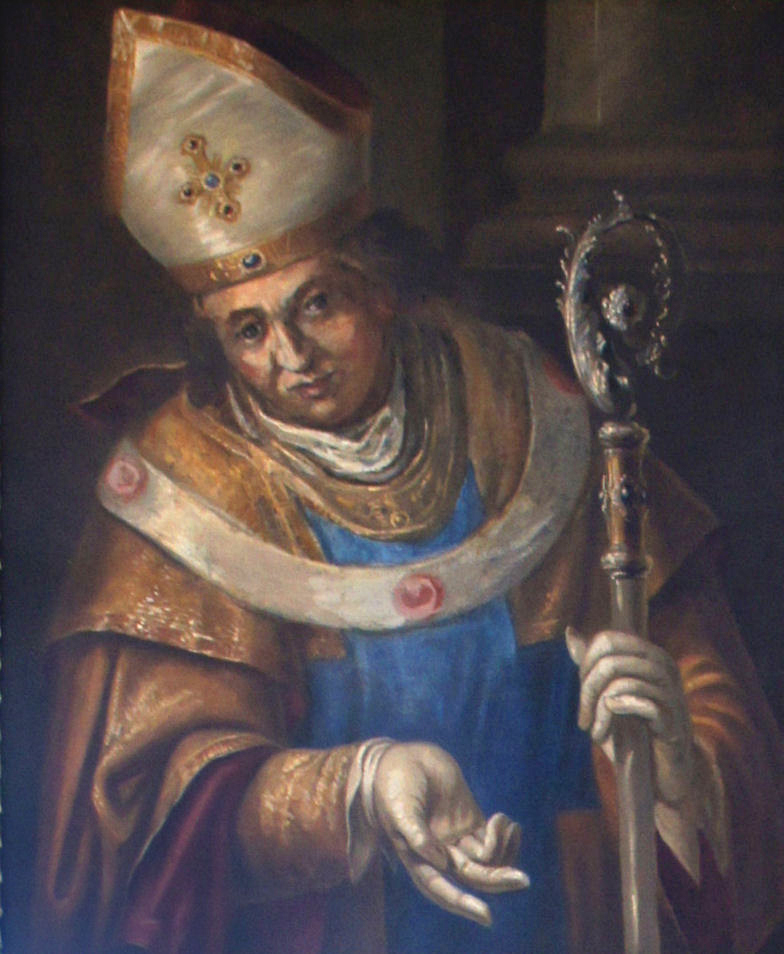
- Bishop Leo Lösch von Hilkertshausen
- Church: Roman Catholic
- In office: 15 February 1552 – 8 April 1559
- Predecessor: Henry of the Palatinate
- Successor: Moritz von Sandizell

Orders
- Consecration: 12 June 1552 by Oswald Arnsperger

Personal details
- Born: Hilgertshausen, Dachau, Duchy of Bavaria
- Died: 8 April 1559

Leo Lösch von Hilkertshausen (died 8 April 1559) was the 49th Bishop of Freising in 1552 to 1559.

== Biography ==
Leo came from Hilgertshausen, near Dachau as a member of a noble family. He encouraged, supported by the Bavarian Duke Albert V, the Counter-Reformation in his diocese. During his tenure, the Peace of Augsburg was established.

== Notes and references ==
Catholic Church titles
| Preceded by Henry of the Palatinate | Prince-Bishop of Freising; 1552 – 1559 | Succeeded by Moritz von Sandizell |
