= Henry of the Palatinate =

Prince-Bishop of Freising from 1541 to 1552

- Prince-Bishop of Freising
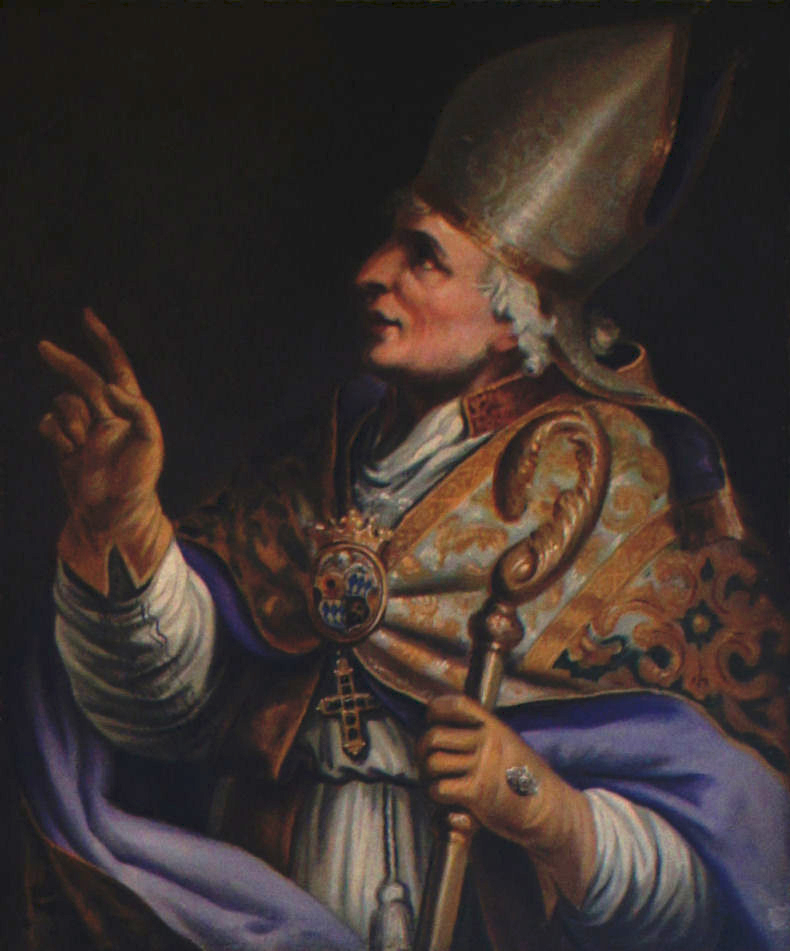
- Henry of the Palatinate
- Church: Roman Catholic
- Diocese: Freising
- See: Freising
- In office: 5 January 1541 – 3 January 1552
- Predecessor: Philip of the Palatinate
- Successor: Leo Lösch von Hilkertshausen
- Other posts: Prince-Bishop of Worms (1524–1552); Prince-Bishop of Utrecht (1524–1529)

Personal details
- Born: 14 February 1487 Heidelberg
- Died: 3 January 1552 (aged 64) Ladenburg

Henry of the Palatinate (German: Heinrich von der Pfalz) (Heidelberg, 14 February 1487 – Ladenburg, 3 January 1552) was Prince-Bishop of Utrecht from 1524 to 1529, Prince-Bishop of Worms from 1524 to 1552 and Prince-Bishop of Freising from 1541 to 1552.

Henry descended from the House of Wittelsbach and was a son of Philip, Elector Palatine. He was canon in Cologne before he was, at the recommendation of the Archbishop of Cologne, bishop of Utrecht elected by the chapters and burghers of Utrecht. But he lacked the support of Charles V, Holy Roman Emperor and Charles II, Duke of Guelders, who made life difficult for him. In the bishopric, Henry faced a faction-struggle. He entertained the idea of building a fort inside the city of Utrecht to keep the citizens in check. This idea would later be realised by Charles V as the Vredenburg.

When the resistance of the Utrecht citizens escalated to the point where they invited troops from Guelders to occupy the city, Henry had no choice but to ask the Habsburgers for help. The Habsburgers quickly restored order, but in return, the bishop was forced to relinquish all the lands controlled by the bishopric. The relinquishment was secured in the treaty of Schoonhoven on 15 November 1527, and on 21 October 1528 the bishop swore fealty to Charles V. This was the end of the Prince-Bishopric of Utrecht as a territorial power. In August 1529, pope Clement VII finally empowered the transfer of the lands.

Henry resigned as bishop of Utrecht on 20 August 1529 to focus on the rule of the calm bishopric of Worms, of which he had been bishop since 1524. He restored the bishop's summer-residence in Dirmstein that had been dismantled during the German Peasants' War of 1525. Later Henry was also consecrated as bishop of Freising, where his brothers Ruprecht and Philip had previously been bishops.

== Notes and references ==
Henry of the Palatinate House of Wittelsbach Born: 1487 Died: 1552
Catholic Church titles
Preceded by Reinhard von Rüppurr	Prince-Bishop of Worms; 1524 – 1552	Succeeded by Dietrich von Rothenstein
Preceded by Philip of Burgundy	Bishop of Utrecht; 1524 – 1529	Succeeded by Willem van Enckenvoirt
Preceded by Philip of the Palatinate	Prince-Bishop of Freising; 1541 – 1552	Succeeded by Leo Lösch von Hilkershausen
