= List of bishops of Freising and archbishops of Munich and Freising =

The following people were bishops, prince-bishops or archbishops of Freising or Munich and Freising in Bavaria:

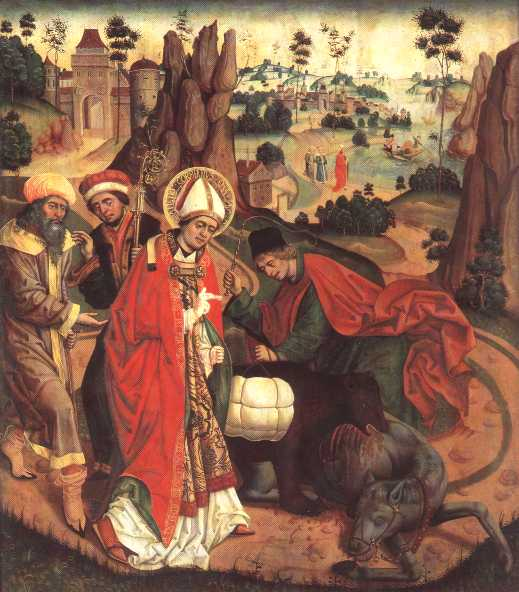
The bear miracle — Saint Corbinian of Freising, as a bishop, crossing the Alps on his way to Rome in 710, Jan Polack, oil on pinewood, 1489

== Bishops of Freising ==
- St. Corbinian (724–730); founded the Benedictine abbey in Freising, although the diocese was not organised until 739)

Establishment of episcopal organisation in Old Bavaria by Saint Boniface in 739.

- Erembert (739–747/748; sometimes referred to as Corbinian's half brother)
- Joseph of Freising, also known as Joseph of Verona (747/748–764)
- Arbeo (764–784)
- Atto (784–811)
- Hitto (811–835)
- Erchanbert (835/836–854)
- Anno (854/855–875)
- Arnold (875–883)
- Waldo (883/884–903/906)
- Utto (904/906–907)
- Dracholf (907–926)
- Wolfram (926–937)
- St. Lantpert (937/938–957)
- Abraham (957–993)
- Gottschalk of Hagenau (993–1006)
- Egilbert of Moosburg (1006–1039)
- Nitker (1039–1052)
- Ellenhard, Count of Meran (1052–1078)
- Meginward, Count of Scheyarn (1078–1098)
- Henry I of Freising, also known as Henry I of Ebersdorf (1098–1137)
- Otto I (1138–1158)
- Albert I of Harthausen (1158–1184)
- Otto II (1184–1220)
- Gerold of Waldeck (1220–1230)
- Conrad I of Tölz and Hohenburg (1230–1258)
- Conrad II Wildgraf of Dhaun (1258–1278)
- Frederick of Montalban (1280–1282)

== Prince-bishops of Freising ==
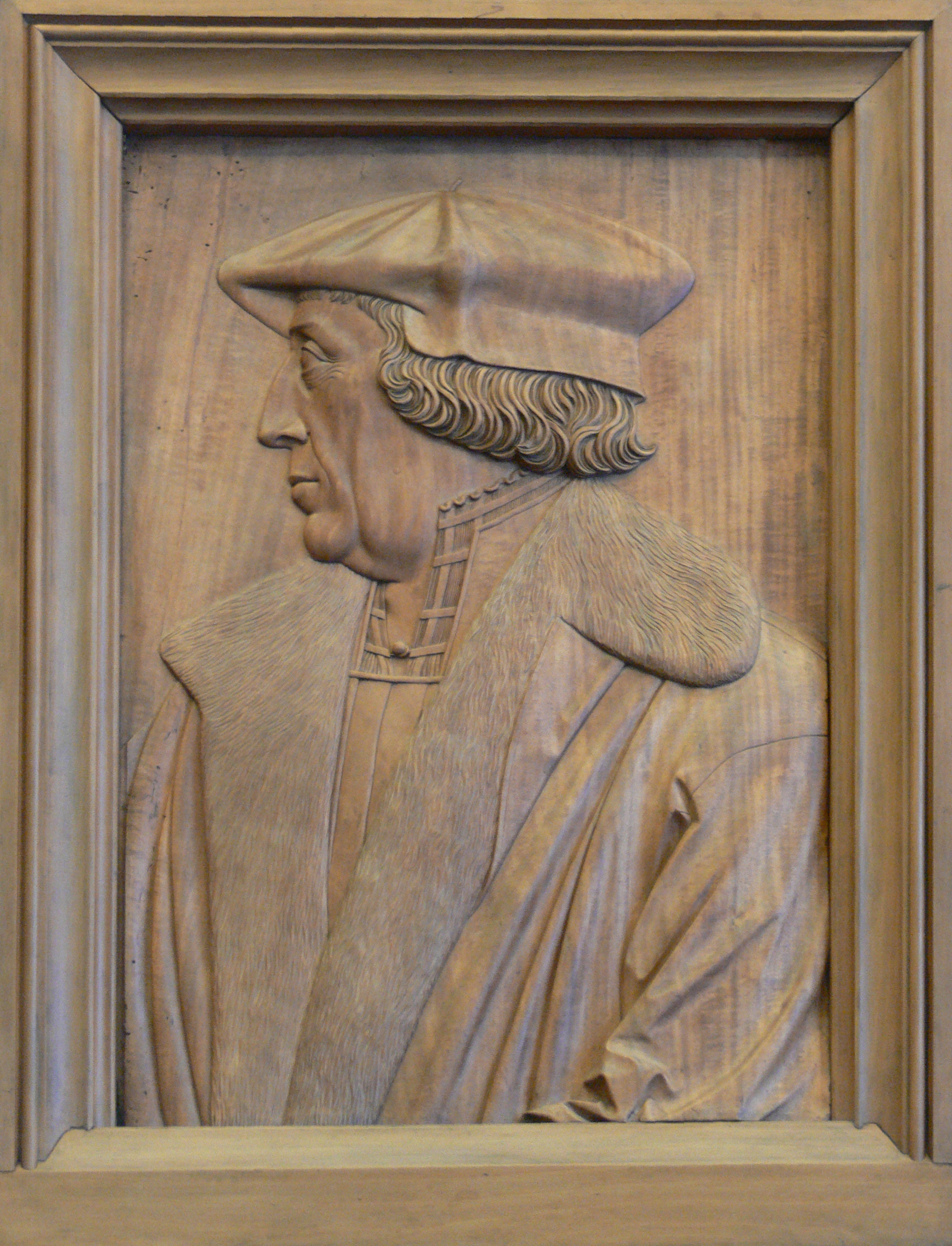
Prince-bishop Philip of the Palatinate (portrait around 1525/1527)

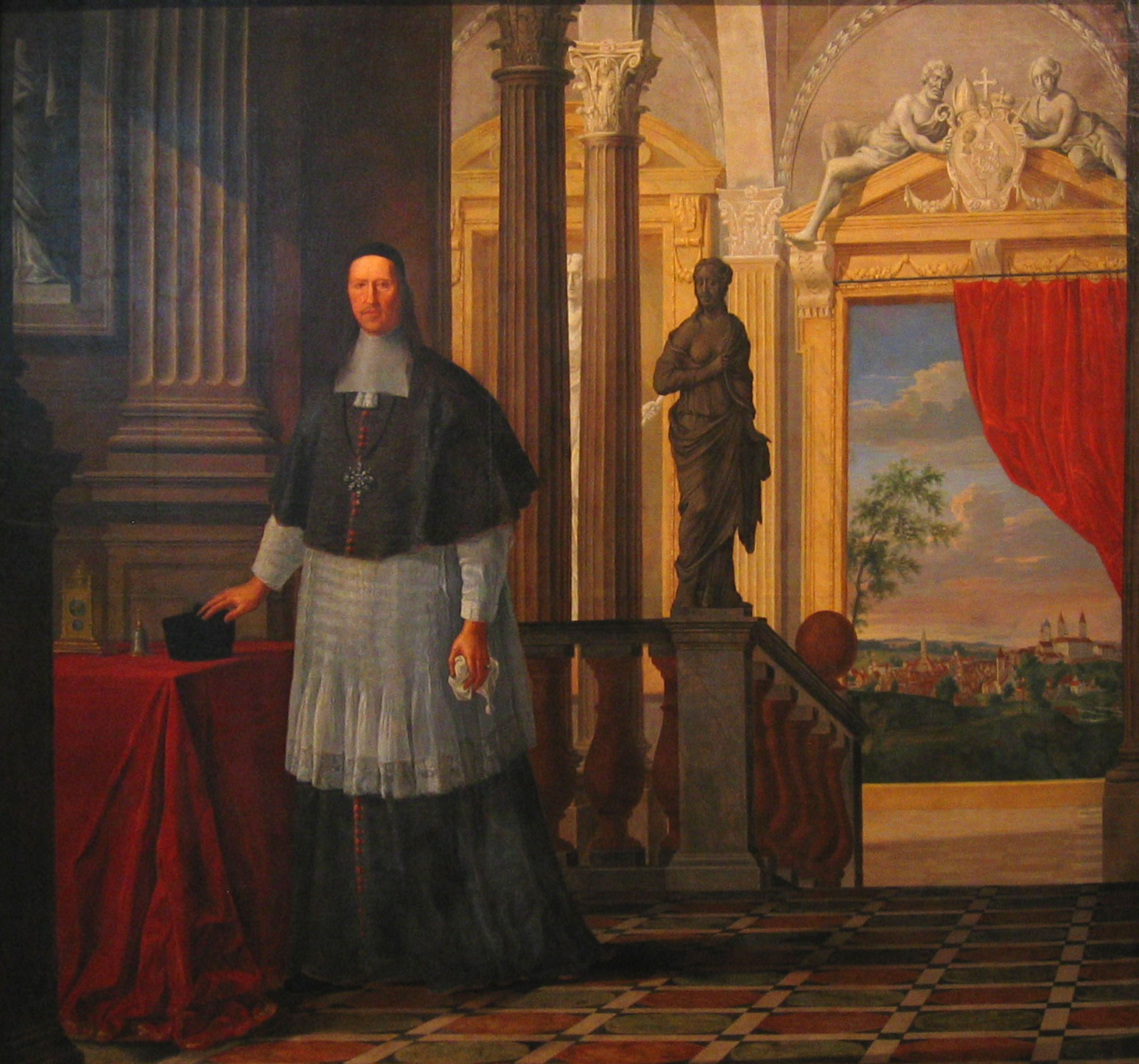
Prince-bishop Albert Sigismund of Bavaria (1675 painting)

The bishop became a prince in 1294.

- Emicho of Wittelsbach (1283–1311)
- Gottfried of Hexenagger (1311–1314)
- Conrad III the Sendlinger (1314–1322)
- John I Wulfing (1323–1324)
- Conrad IV of Klingenberg (1324–1340)
- John II Hake (1340–1349)
- Albert II of Hohenberg (1349–1359)
- Paul of Jägerndorf (1359–1377)
- Leopold of Sturmberg (1377–1381)
- Berthold of Wehingen (1381–1410)
- Conrad of Hebenstreit (1411–1412)
- Hermann of Cilli (1412–1421)
- Nicodemus della Scala (1421–1443)
- Henry II of Schlick (1443–1448)
- John III Grünwald (elected 15 January 1448; died 2 December 1452)
- Johann Tulbeck (elected January 1453; resigned November 1473)
- Sixtus of Tannberg (elected 12 January 1474; died 14 July 1495)
- Ruprecht of the Palatinate (elected 1 August 1495; resigned 3 December 1498)
- Philip of the Palatinate (elected 1498; died 5 January 1541)
- Henry of the Palatinate (succeeded 5 January 1541; died 3 January 1552)
- Leo Lösch of Hilkertshausen (elected 15 February 1552; died 8 April 1559)
- Moritz von Sandizell (elected 12 June 1559; died 18 October 1566)
- Ernest of Bavaria (elected 18 October 1566; died 17 February 1612)
- Stephan of Seiboldsdorf (elected 7 May 1612; died 18 January 1618)
- Veit Adam of Gepeckh von Arnsbach (elected 12 February 1618; died 8 December 1651)
- Albert Sigismund of Bavaria (8 December 1651 – 5 November 1685)
- Joseph Clemens of Bavaria (succeeded 5 November 1685 – 29 September 1694)
- Johann Francis Eckher of Kapfing and Liechteneck (elected 29 January 1695; died 23 February 1727)
- Johann Theodor of Bavaria (succeeded 23 February 1727; died 27 January 1763)
- Clemens Wenceslaus of Saxony (elected 18 April 1763; resigned 20 August 1768)
- Louis Joseph of Welden on Laupheim and Hohenaltingen (elected 23 January 1768; died 15 March 1788)
- Maximilian Prokop of Toerring-Jettenbach elected 26 May 1788; died 30 December 1789)
- Joseph Conrad of Schroffenberg-Mös, C.R.S.A. (elected 1 March 1790; died 4 April 1803). After his death, the temporal authority of the bishop was mediatised and abolished by the Elector of Bavaria.

Sede vacante as a result of the secularisation under Napoleonic rule (1803–1821)

- Joseph James of Heckenstaller, priest, vicar capitular (appointed 14 April 1803); was also named first a vicar general and, later, a papal delegate as "vicar capitular apostolic", but never raised to the episcopacy; resigned 16 February 1818. The episcopal functions were exercised by auxiliary bishop, Johann Nepomuk Wolf.

== Archbishops of Munich and Freising ==
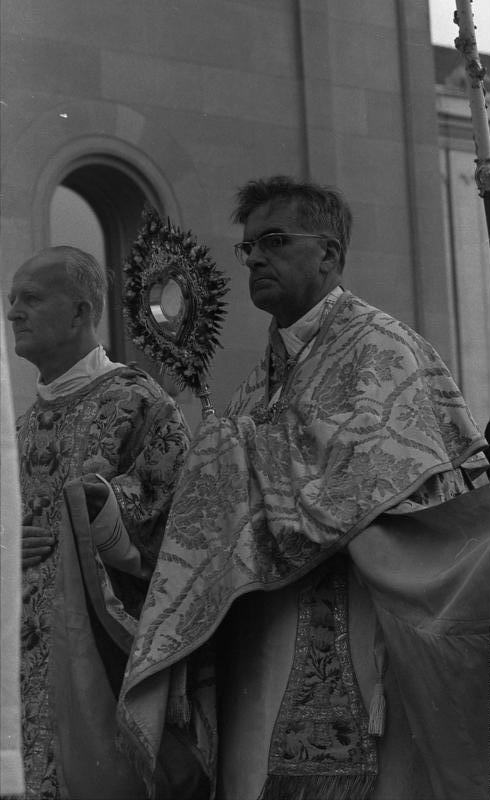
Cardinal Döpfner at Munich's Corpus Christi procession in 1971

Elevation to an archdiocese in 1817/1821

- Lothar Anselm von Gebsattel (appointed 5 February 1818; confirmed soon, but at first only apostolic administrator; archbishop 1 November 1821; died 1 October 1846)
- Karl-August von Reisach (succeeded 1 October 1846; cardinal 17 December 1855; resigned 19 June 1856)
- Gregor von Scherr, O.S.B. (appointed 6 January 1856; died 24 October 1877)
- Antonius von Steichele (appointed 30 April 1878; died 9 October 1889)
- Antonius von Thoma (appointed 23 October 1889; died 24 November 1897)
- Franz Joseph von Stein (appointed 24 December 1897; died 4 May 1909)
- Franziskus von Bettinger (appointed 23 May 1909; cardinal 25 May 1914; died 12 April 1917)
- Michael von Faulhaber (appointed 26 May 1917; cardinal 7 March 1921; died 12 June 1952)
- Joseph Wendel (appointed 9 August 1952; cardinal 12 January 1953; died 31 December 1960)
- Julius Döpfner (appointed 3 July 1961, already a cardinal; died 24 July 1976)
- Joseph Ratzinger (appointed 24 March 1977; cardinal 27 June 1977; resigned 15 February 1982), subsequently Pope Benedict XVI
- Friedrich Wetter (appointed 28 October 1982; cardinal 25 May 1985; retired 2 February 2007)
- Reinhard Marx (appointed 30 November 2007; cardinal 20 November 2010)

== See also ==
- Archdiocese of Munich and Freising

== Bibliography ==
- Alois Weissthanner (ed.), Die Regesten der Bischöfe von Freising, Vol. I, 739–1184. Continued and completed by Gertrud Thoma and Martin Ott (= registers of Bavarian history), C.H. Beck, Munich, 2009 ISBN 978-3-406-37104-2. (Recension).
