= Franziskus von Bettinger =

Archbishop of Munich and Freising from 1909 to 1917

His Eminence Franziskus von Bettinger
- Archbishop of Munich and Freising
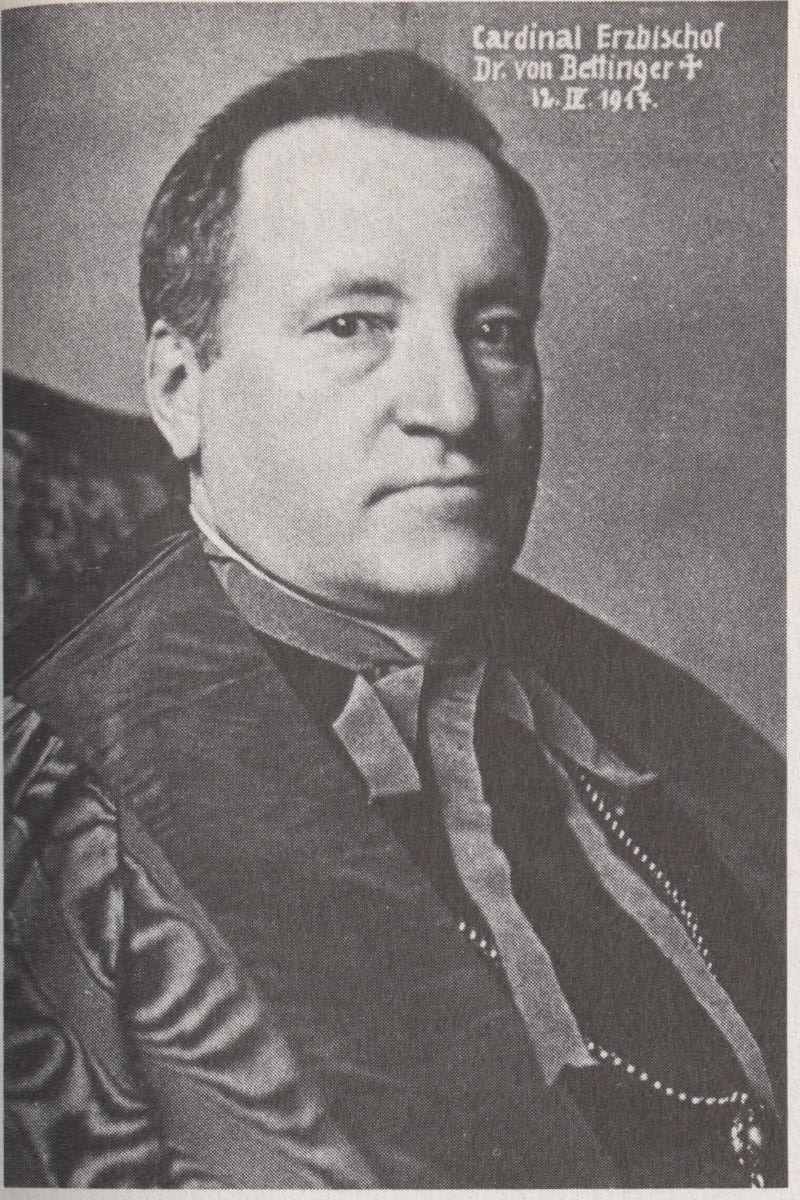
- Church: Roman Catholic
- Archdiocese: Munich and Freising
- Province: Munich and Freising
- Appointed: 23 May 1909
- Installed: 15 August 1909
- Term ended: 12 April 1917
- Predecessor: Franz Joseph von Stein
- Successor: Michael von Faulhaber
- Other post: Cardinal-Priest of San Marcello

Orders
- Ordination: 17 August 1873
- Consecration: 15 August 1909 by Andreas Franz Frühwirth
- Created cardinal: 25 May 1914
- Rank: Cardinal-Priest

Personal details
- Born: Franziskus von Bettinger; 17 September 1850 Landstuhl, Palatinate, Bavaria
- Died: 12 April 1917 (aged 66) Munich, Bavaria
- Buried: Frauenkirche, Munich
- Denomination: Roman Catholic
- Motto: pax in virtute
- Coat of arms

Franziskus von Bettinger (17 September 1850 – 12 April 1917) was a German Cardinal and Roman Catholic Archbishop of Munich and Freising from 1909 to 1917.

== Biography ==
Bettinger was born in Landstuhl in the Palatinate, the eldest of the six children (five sons and one daughter) of Franz Michael Bettinger, a blacksmith, and his wife, Maria Josephine Weber.

He studied philosophy, theology and canon law at the Lyceum of Speyer, the University of Innsbruck, the University of Würzburg, and the Seminary of Speyer. He was ordained to the priesthood on 17 August 1873 in Speyer.

Bettinger held a number of pastoral posts in the diocese of Speyer: chaplain in Zweibrücken, 1873–1877; chaplain in Kaiserslautern, 1877–1878; cooperator in Reichenbach, 1878–1879; administrator, and later pastor and school inspector in Lambaheim, 1879–1888; pastor in Roxheim, 1888–1895.

In 1895 he was named a canon of the cathedral chapter and pastor of Speyer. In 1909 he was promoted to the office of dean of the cathedral chapter. Shortly afterwards he was ennobled by Prince Regent Luitpold, Prince Regent of Bavaria; henceforth he had the surname von Bettinger.

On 6 June 1909 Bettinger was elected archbishop of Munich and Freising. He was ordained a bishop on 15 August 1909 in Munich by Andreas Frühwirth, Titular Archbishop of Eraclea, Nuncio to Bavaria.

In the consistory of 24 May 1914 Pope Pius X named Bettinger a cardinal. On 28 May he received the red hat and the title of Cardinal Priest of San Marcello. He participated in the 1914 conclave.

Bettinger died suddenly of a heart attack in Munich, aged 66. His remains are buried in the crypt of the cathedral.

== Notes and references ==
Catholic Church titles
Preceded by Franz Joseph von Stein	Archbishop of Munich and Freising; 1909 – 1917	Succeeded by Michael von Faulhaber
