= Antonius von Thoma =

Archbishop of Munich and Freising from 1889 to 1897

- Archbishop of Munich and Freising
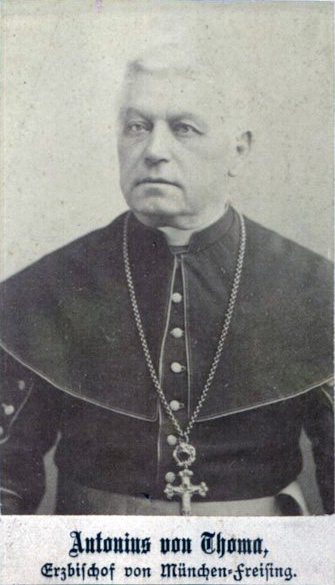
- Church: Catholic Church
- Archdiocese: Munich and Freising
- Appointed: 23 October 1889
- Installed: 21 April 1890
- Term ended: 24 November 1897
- Predecessor: Antonius von Steichele
- Successor: Franz Joseph von Stein
- Previous post: Bishop of Passau (1889)

Personal details
- Born: 1 March 1829 Nymphenburg, Bavaria
- Died: 24 November 1897 (aged 68) Munich, Bavaria
- Denomination: Roman Catholic
- Coat of arms

Antonius von Thoma (1 March 1829 – 24 November 1897) was Bishop and later Archbishop of the Archdiocese of Munich and Freising from 1889 until his death in 1897.

== Biography ==
Thoma was ordained a priest on 29 June 1853 in the Archdiocese of Munich and Freising, aged 24. His consecrator was Archbishop Antonius von Steichele.

On 24 March 1889, aged 60, he was appointed Bishop of Passau and confirmed two months later, and finally ordained on 28 July 1889.

On 23 October 1889, aged 60, he was appointed as Archbishop of the Archdiocese of Munich and Freising, confirmed two months later and installed on 21 April 1890.

On 24 November 1897, aged 68, he died in Munich. He had been a priest for 44 years and a bishop for 8 years.

== Bibliography ==
- Remigius Ritzler; Pirminus Sefrin (1978). Hierarchia catholica Medii et recentioris aevi (in Latin). Vol. VIII (1846–1903). Il Messaggero di S. Antonio. pp. 390, 442.

Catholic Church titles
| Preceded by Antonius von Steichele | Archbishop of Munich and Freising; 1889 – 1897 | Succeeded by Franz Joseph von Stein |
