= Moritz von Sandizell =

Bishop Emeretius of Freising from 1559 to 1566

- Bishop Emeretius of Freising
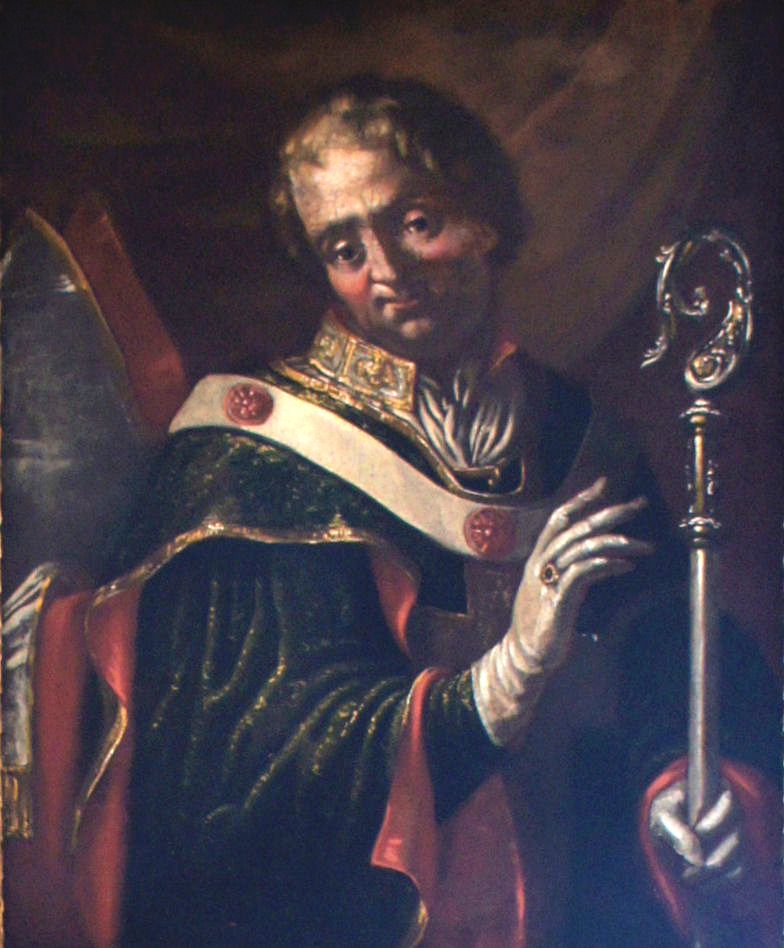
- Bishop of Freising Moritz von Sandizell
- Church: Roman Catholic
- In office: 12 June 1559 – 18 October 1566
- Retired: 1566
- Predecessor: Leo Lösch von Hilkertshausen
- Successor: Ernest of Bavaria

Orders
- Ordination: 2 March 1561

Personal details
- Born: 1514
- Died: 26 February 1567; Freising

Moritz von Sandizell (1514 – 26 February 1567) held the position of Bishop Emeretius of Freising from 1559 to 1566.

== Life ==
Moritz von Sandizell was born in 1514, into the noble Sandizell family. Before he became involved in the Church, Moritz von Sandizell went to the University of Ingolstadt. In 1532, he was admitted to the Freising Cathedral chapter as a Domherr, and became a full member of the chapter (Domkapitular) in 1546. He was selected Bishop of Freising on 12 June 1559 through the influence of Duke Albert V of Bavaria. After obtaining papal confirmation, on 2 March 1561 he was consecrated as bishop. As his first major task, the new bishop faced the implementation of the "Visitatio Bavarica" in his diocese, aimed at assessing the religious situation after the Reformation. On 18 October 1566, the bishop announced his resignation in favor of Ernest of Bavaria, who was just a child at the time. After negotiations, the resignation was approved by Pope Pius V in December 1566. This marked the beginning of a new era for the Diocese of Freising, with a series of spiritual princes from the House of Wittelsbach ruling for the next two centuries. Less than a year later, Moritz died on 26 February 1567, at the age of 53.

== Notes and references ==
Catholic Church titles
Preceded by Leo Lösch von Hilkertshausen	Bishop Emeretius of Freising; 1559 – 1566	Succeeded by Ernest of Bavaria
