= Gregor von Scherr =

Archbishop of Munich and Freising from 1856 to 1877

Gregor von Scherr O.S.B.
- Archbishop of Munich and Freising
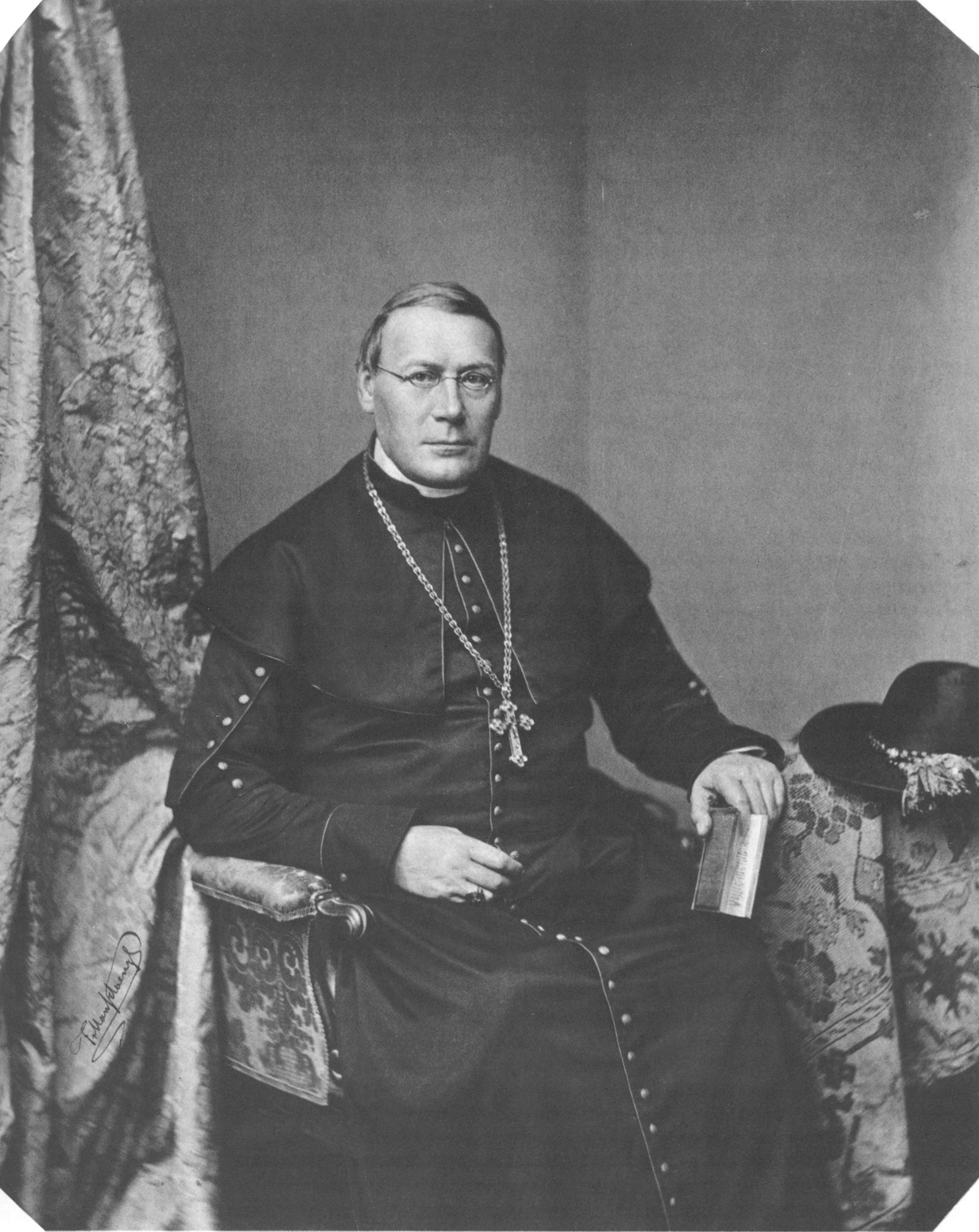
- Church: Catholic Church
- Archdiocese: Munich and Freising
- See: Munich and Freising
- Appointed: 6 January 1856
- Installed: 28 August 1856
- Term ended: 24 October 1877
- Predecessor: Karl August von Reisach
- Successor: Antonius von Steichele

Orders
- Ordination: 4 August 1829
- Consecration: 3 August 1856 by Antonio Saverio De Luca

Personal details
- Born: 22 June 1804 Neunburg vorm Wald
- Died: 24 October 1877 (aged 73) Munich
- Buried: Frauenkirche, Munich
- Denomination: Roman Catholic
- Coat of arms

Gregor von Scherr (22 June 1804, Neunburg vorm Wald – 24 October 1877, Munich) was Archbishop of Munich and Freising from 1856 until 1877.

== Biography ==
Born on 22 June 1804 at Neunburg vorm Wald, Scherr was ordained on 4 August 1829, aged 25 as a priest of Regensburg, Germany by Cardinal Antonio Saverio De Luca. On 29 December 1833, aged 29, he joined the Order of Saint Benedict (OSB) and later became Abbot of St. Michael's Abbey at Metten.

On 6 January 1856, aged 51, Scherr was appointed Archbishop of Munich and Freising. He was confirmed as Archbishop on 19 June 1856, aged 52, and installed two months later. Von Scherr endeavoured to preserve the Catholic character of the schools. For the maintenance of the lesser seminaries of the diocese which had been obliged to receive an exceptionally large number of candidates to the priesthood, he founded St. Corbinian's Association and erected a lesser seminary in Freising. He introduced into his diocese the devotion of the Perpetual Adoration of the Blessed Sacrament and instituted pastoral conferences of the clergy.

At the First Vatican Council, Scherr voted with the minority but submitted at once to the decision of the council. In April 1871 Bishop Von Scherr excommunicated Ignaz von Döllinger, professor at the Ludwig-Maximilians-Universität München, for his concerted opposition to the Council's decrees.

The last years of Scherr's episcopate were embittered by the support which the Bavarian Government, under the leadership of Lutz, minister of worship, gave to the Old Catholic movement, whose most zealous champions were resident in Munich.

Scherr died on 24 October 1877, aged 73. He was a priest for 48 years and a bishop for 21 years.

== Notes and references ==
=== Attribution ===
Catholic Church titles
Preceded by Karl-August von Reisach	Archbishop of Munich; 1856 – 1877	Succeeded by Antonius von Steichele
