= Erembert =

Second bishop of the Diocese of Freising, Bavaria

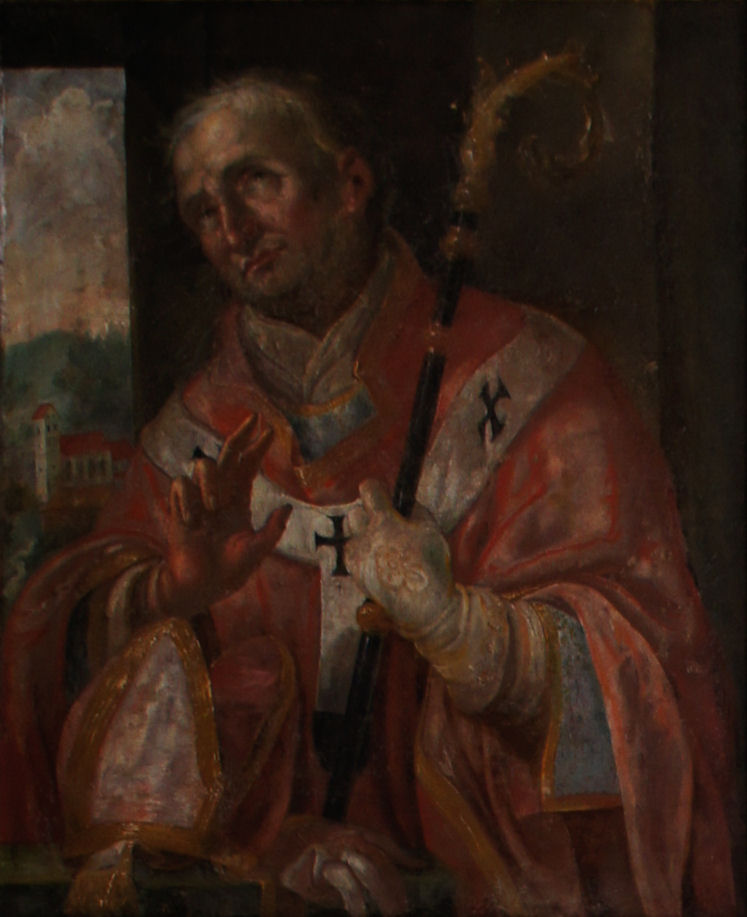
Erembert, painting in Freising by Franz Joseph Lederer (1676–1733) and others.

Erembert is traditionally seen as the second bishop of the Diocese of Freising in Bavaria. Tradition used to consider him a half brother of the founder, Saint Corbinian (a Frank), though recent research argues he hailed from the Freising area. He was appointed by Saint Boniface in 739, at the time of Boniface's reorganization of the Bavarian church.

== See also ==
- Bishops of Freising and Archbishops of Munich and Freising
