= Franz Joseph von Stein =

Archbishop of Munich and Freising from 1897 to 1909

- Archbishop of Munich and Freising
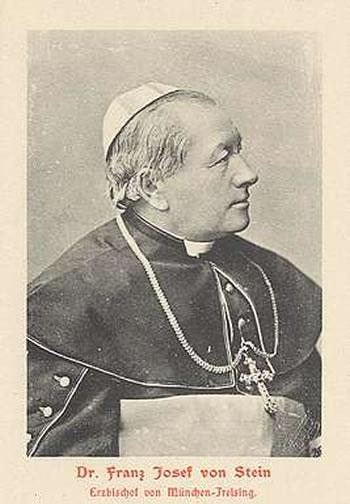
- Church: Catholic Church
- Archdiocese: Munich and Freising
- See: Munich and Freising
- Appointed: 24 December 1897
- Installed: 18 April 1898
- Term ended: 4 May 1909
- Predecessor: Antonius von Thoma
- Successor: Franziskus von Bettinger
- Previous post: Bishop of Würzburg (1879-1897)

Orders
- Ordination: 10 August 1855
- Consecration: 18 May 1879 by Friedrich Josef von Schreiber

Personal details
- Born: 4 April 1832 Amorbach, Untermainkreis, Bavaria
- Died: 4 May 1909 (aged 77) Munich, Bavaria
- Denomination: Roman Catholic
- Coat of arms

Franz Joseph von Stein (4 April 1832 – 4 May 1909) was Archbishop of Munich and Freising from 1897 until 1909.

== Biography ==
Born 4 April 1832, Amorbach, on 10 August 1855, aged 23, he was ordained a priest of Würzburg, Germany and consecrated by archbishop Friedrich Josef von Schreiber and Bishops Joseph Georg von Ehrler and Joseph Franz von Weckert.

On 19 October 1878, aged 46, he was appointed Bishop of Würzburg, and confirmed and ordained early the following year. On 24 December 1897, aged 65, he was appointed Archbishop of Munich and Freising and installed on 18 April 1898.

In 1900 he acted the religious wedding of Princess Elisabeth of Bavaria, and was given the Grand Cordon of Leopold, by king Leopold II.

He died on 4 May 1909, aged 77. He had been a priest for 53 years and a bishop for 30 years.

== Honours ==
- 1900 : Grand Cordon of the Order of Leopold.

== Notes and references ==
Catholic Church titles
Preceded by Antonius von Thoma	Archbishop of Munich and Freising; 1897 – 1909	Succeeded by Franziskus von Bettinger
