= Zott (dairy company) =

German dairy company

Zott SE & Co. KG
- Native name: Zott SE & Co. KG
- Type: Societas Europaea
- Industry: Food processing
- Founded: Mertingen, Germany (1926)
- Founder: Anna and Balthasar Reiter
- Number of locations: Sales in 75 countries
- Key people: Christine Weber; Anton Hammer; Frank Uszko
- Products: Dairy products
- Revenue: 865 million euro (2016)
- Number of employees: 3,000 (2017)
- Website: www.zott-dairy.com/en

Zott is a German dairy company founded in Mertingen, Germany in 1926. Zott produces dairy products including milk and cheese, cream, yogurt and desserts. Its brands include Monte, Jogobella, Zottarella, Sahne-Joghurt and Bayerntaler.

Zott is one of the largest dairy companies in Europe and one of the leading dairy producers in Poland, manufacturing 951 million kg of milk with sales of €865 million in 2016 while employing 3,000.

A wood-chip heat power station supplies the plant in Mertingen (Germany) with energy.

In 2012 Zott obtained the license to use the "GM-free" label for the brands Zottarella and Bayerntaler.
