= Mertingen =

- Municipality
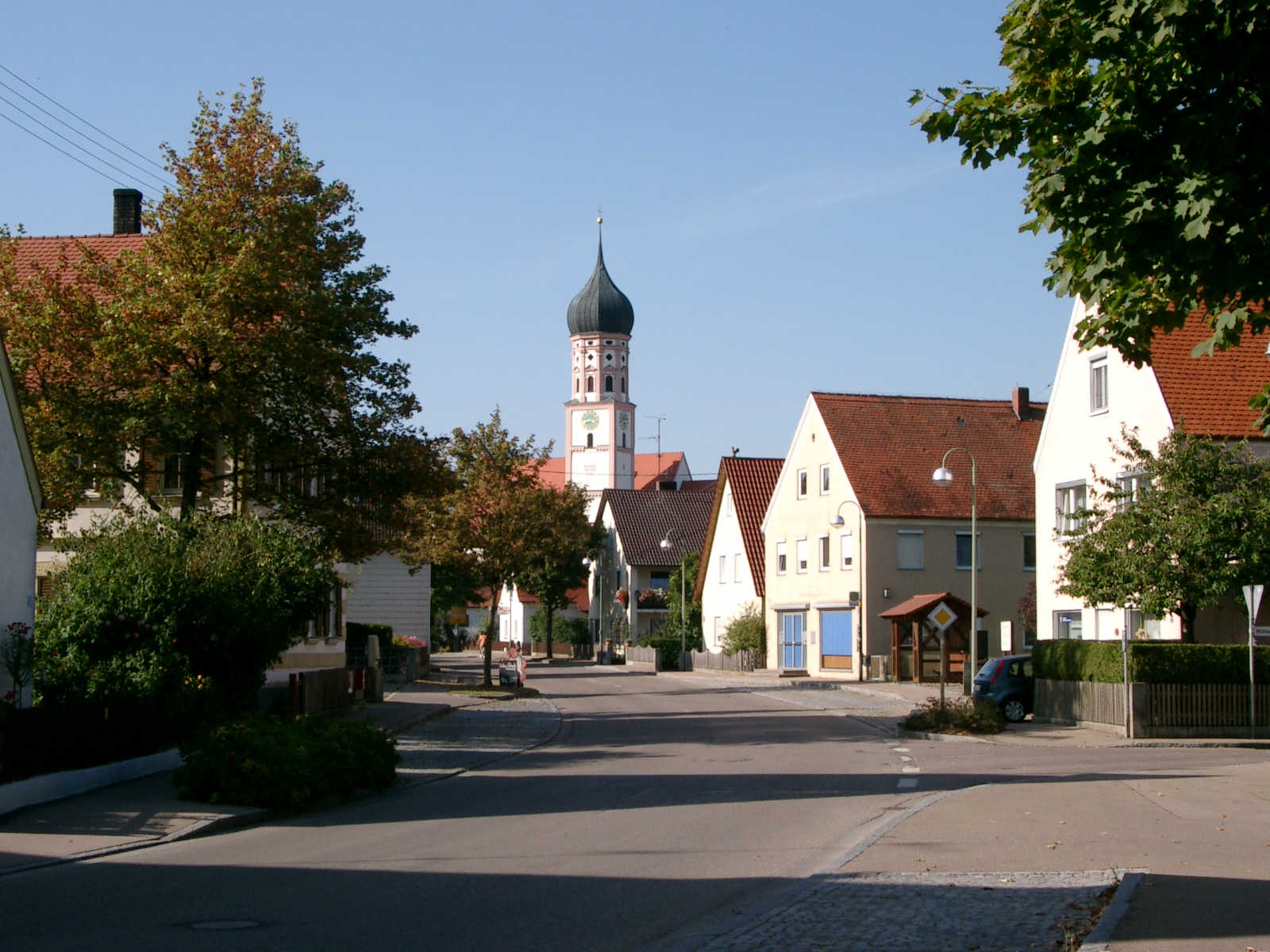
- Center of Mertingen

- Coat of arms

- Location of Mertingen within Donau-Ries district
- Interactive map of Mertingen
- Location within Germany Location within Bavaria
- Coordinates: 48°39′N 10°47′E
- Country: Germany
- State: Bavaria
- Admin. region: Schwaben
- District: Donau-Ries

Government
  - Mayor (2020–26): Veit Meggle

Area
  - Total: 38.42 km^{2} (14.83 sq mi)
- Elevation: 411 m (1,348 ft)

Population (2025-12-31)
  - Total: 3,977
  - Density: 103.5/km^{2} (268.1/sq mi)
- Time zone: UTC+01:00 (CET)
  - Summer (DST): UTC+02:00 (CEST)
- Postal codes: 86690
- Dialling codes: 09078
- Vehicle registration: DON
- Website: www.mertingen.de

Mertingen is a municipality in the district of Donau-Ries in Bavaria in Germany.

The important Roman road, the Via Claudia Augusta was built in this area near the location of "Burghoefe" during the 1st century AD, linking Italy with the Danube river. It had its northern end around Mertingen, it then branched into a Roman military road following the Danube river from its origin in the West to Regensburg in the East.

The Zott dairy company has its headquarters and factory in the town.
