= Hilgertshausen-Tandern =

- Municipality
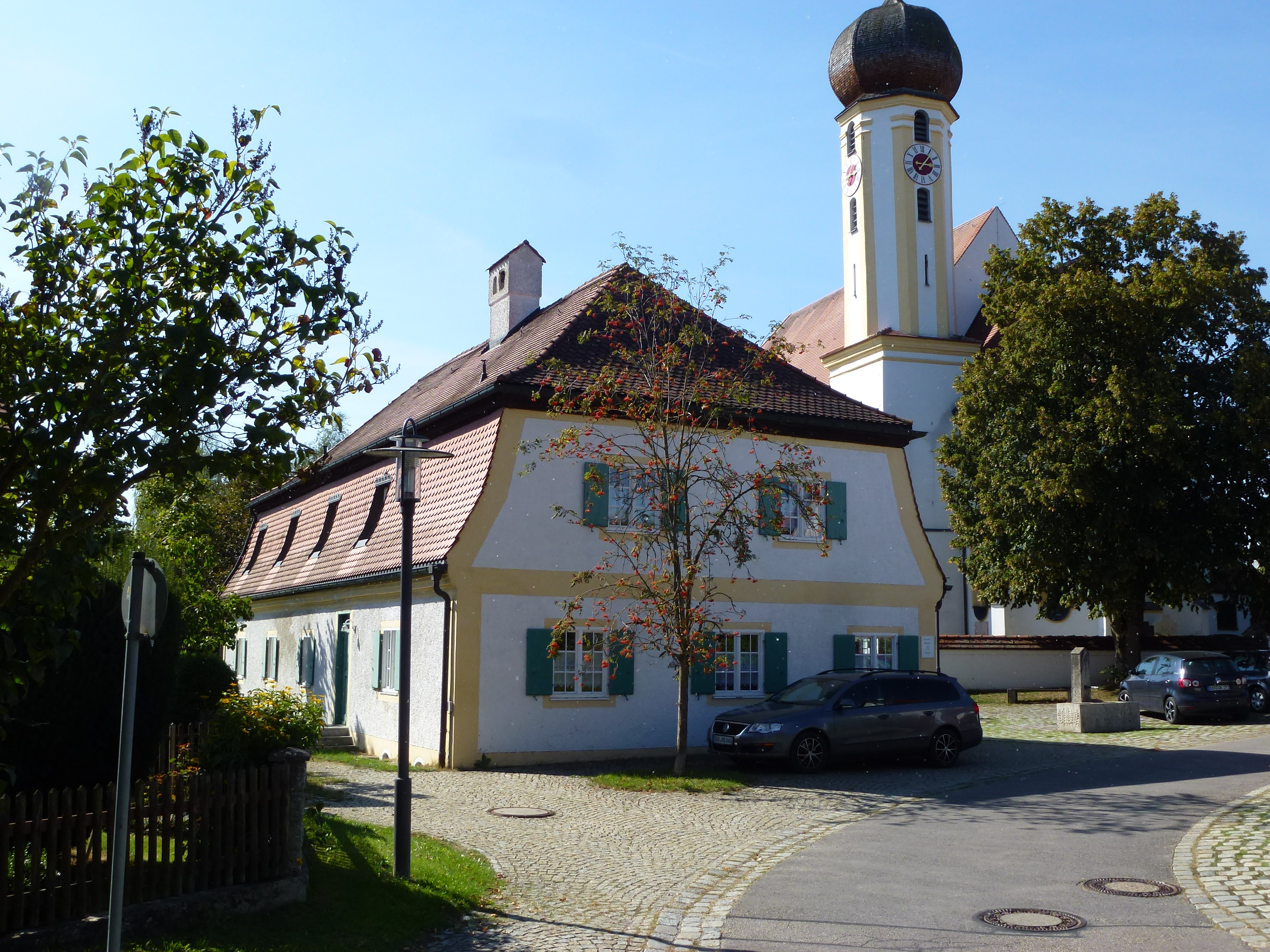
- Church of Saint Stephen in Hilgertshausen

- Coat of arms

- Location of Hilgertshausen-Tandern within Dachau district
- Interactive map of Hilgertshausen-Tandern
- Location within Germany Location within Bavaria
- Coordinates: 48°25′N 11°19′E
- Country: Germany
- State: Bavaria
- Admin. region: Oberbayern
- District: Dachau
- Subdivisions: 26 Ortsteile

Government
  - Mayor (2023–29): Markus Hertlein

Area
  - Total: 28.68 km^{2} (11.07 sq mi)
- Elevation: 507 m (1,663 ft)

Population (2025-12-31)
  - Total: 3,343
  - Density: 116.6/km^{2} (301.9/sq mi)
- Time zone: UTC+01:00 (CET)
  - Summer (DST): UTC+02:00 (CEST)
- Postal codes: 86567
- Dialling codes: 08250
- Vehicle registration: DAH
- Website: www.hilgertshausen-tandern.de

Hilgertshausen-Tandern (German pronunciation: [hɪlɡɐtsˈhaʊzn̩ ˈtandɐn]) is a municipality in the district of Dachau in Bavaria in Germany.
