= Archdiocese of Munich and Freising =

Diocese of the Roman Catholic Church in Bavaria, Germany

Coordinates: 48°08′19″N 11°34′26″E

Archdiocese of Munich and Freising Archidioecesis Monacensis et Frisingensis Erzbistum München und Freising

Catholic
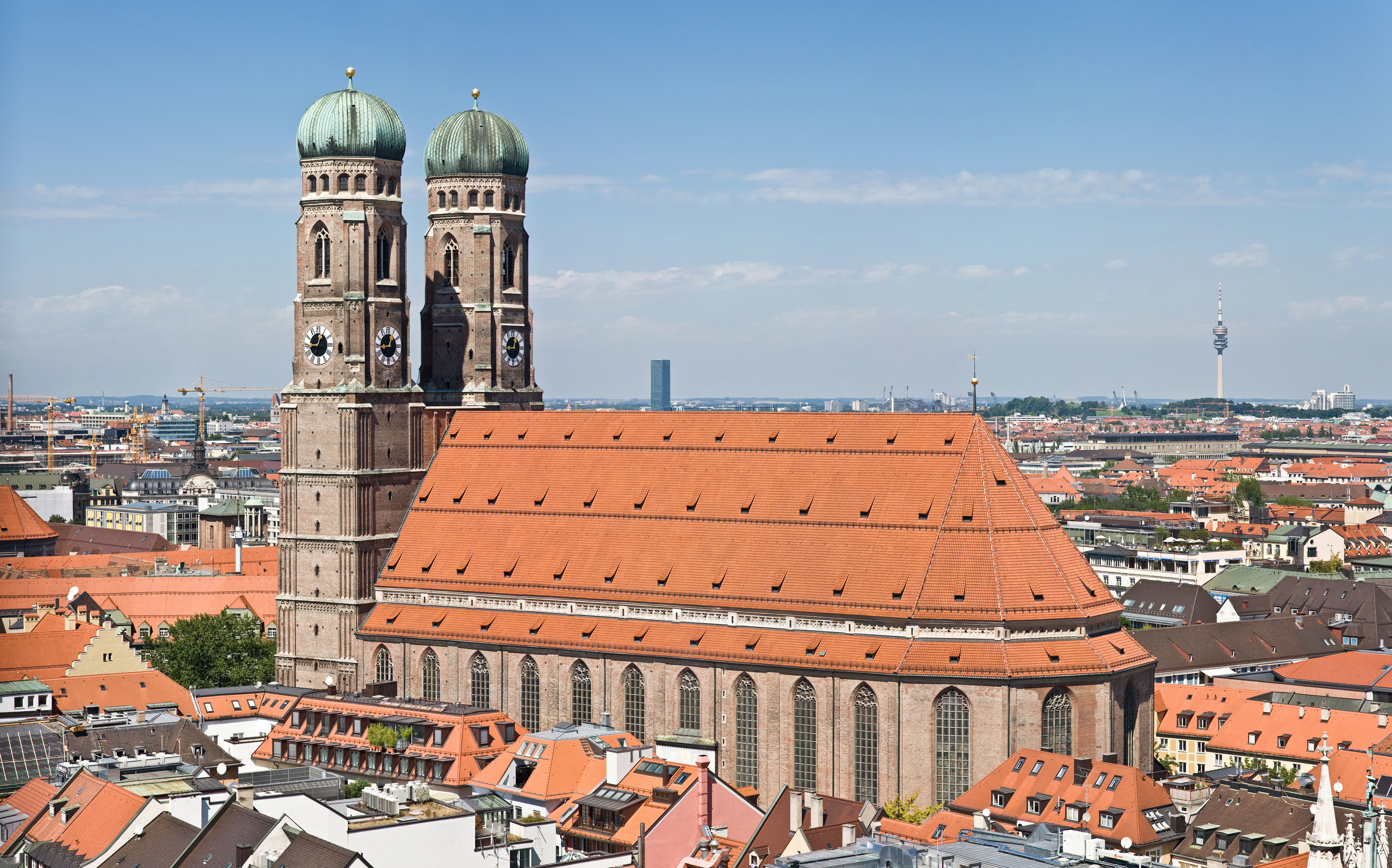
- Frauenkirche, Munich

- Coat of arms

Location
- Country: Germany
- Ecclesiastical province: Munich and Freising

Statistics
- Area: 11,998 km^{2} (4,632 sq mi)
- Population: Total; Catholics: (as of 2022); 3,855,000; 1,499,000 (38.9%)
- Parishes: 747

Information
- Denomination: Catholic
- Sui iuris church: Latin Church
- Rite: Roman Rite
- Established: 739
- Cathedral: Frauenkirche
- Co-cathedral: Freising Cathedral
- Patron saint: St. Corbinian

Current leadership
- Pope: Leo XIV
- Archbishop: Reinhard Marx; Archbishop of Munich and Freising
- Auxiliary Bishops: Wolfgang Bischof, Rupert zu Stolberg-Stolberg
- Bishops emeritus: Friedrich Wetter, Bernhard Haßlberger

Map
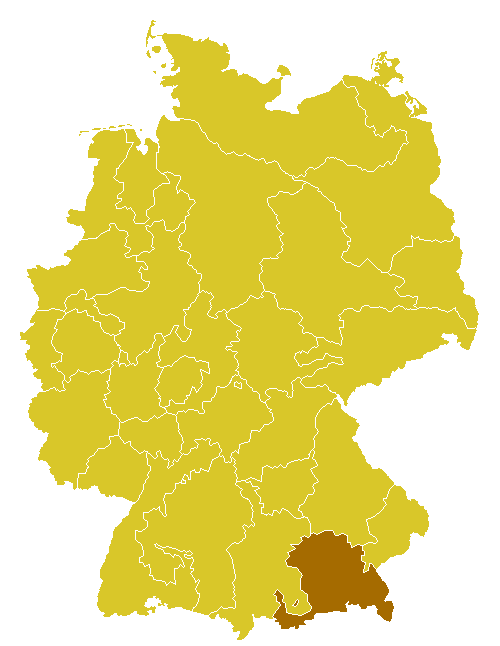

Website
- erzbistum-muenchen-und-freising.de

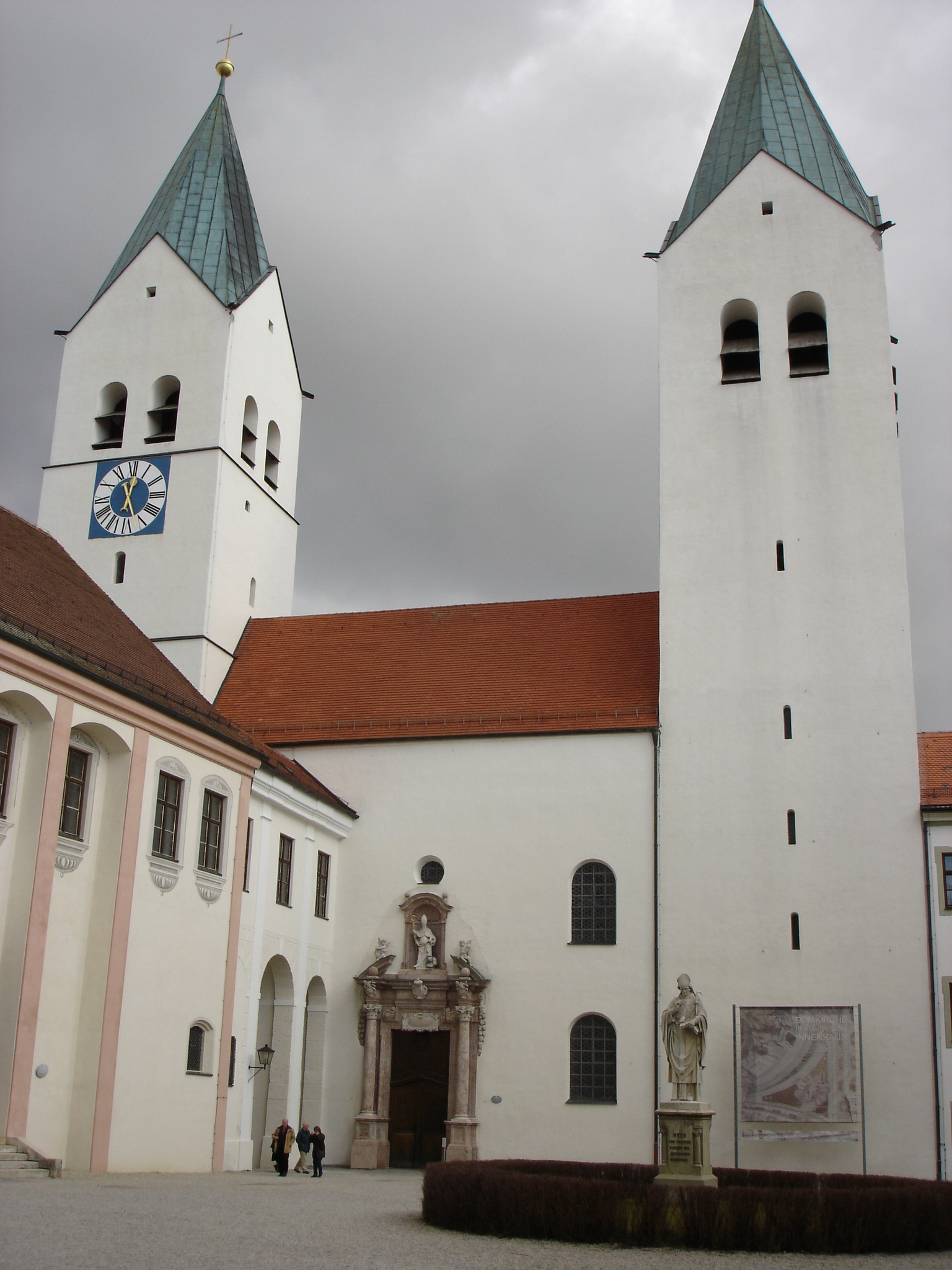
Freising Cathedral

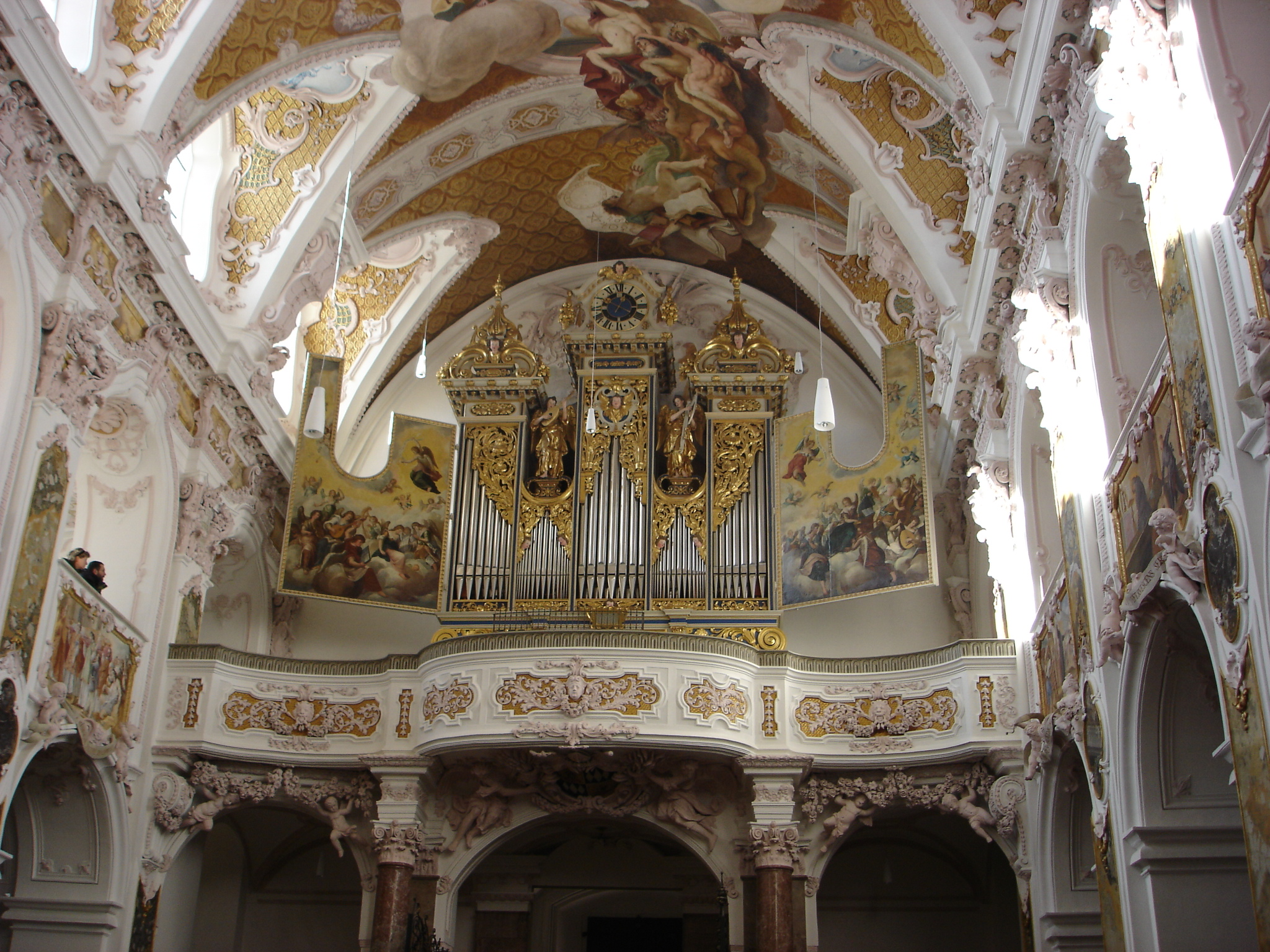
Freising Cathedral's pipe organ

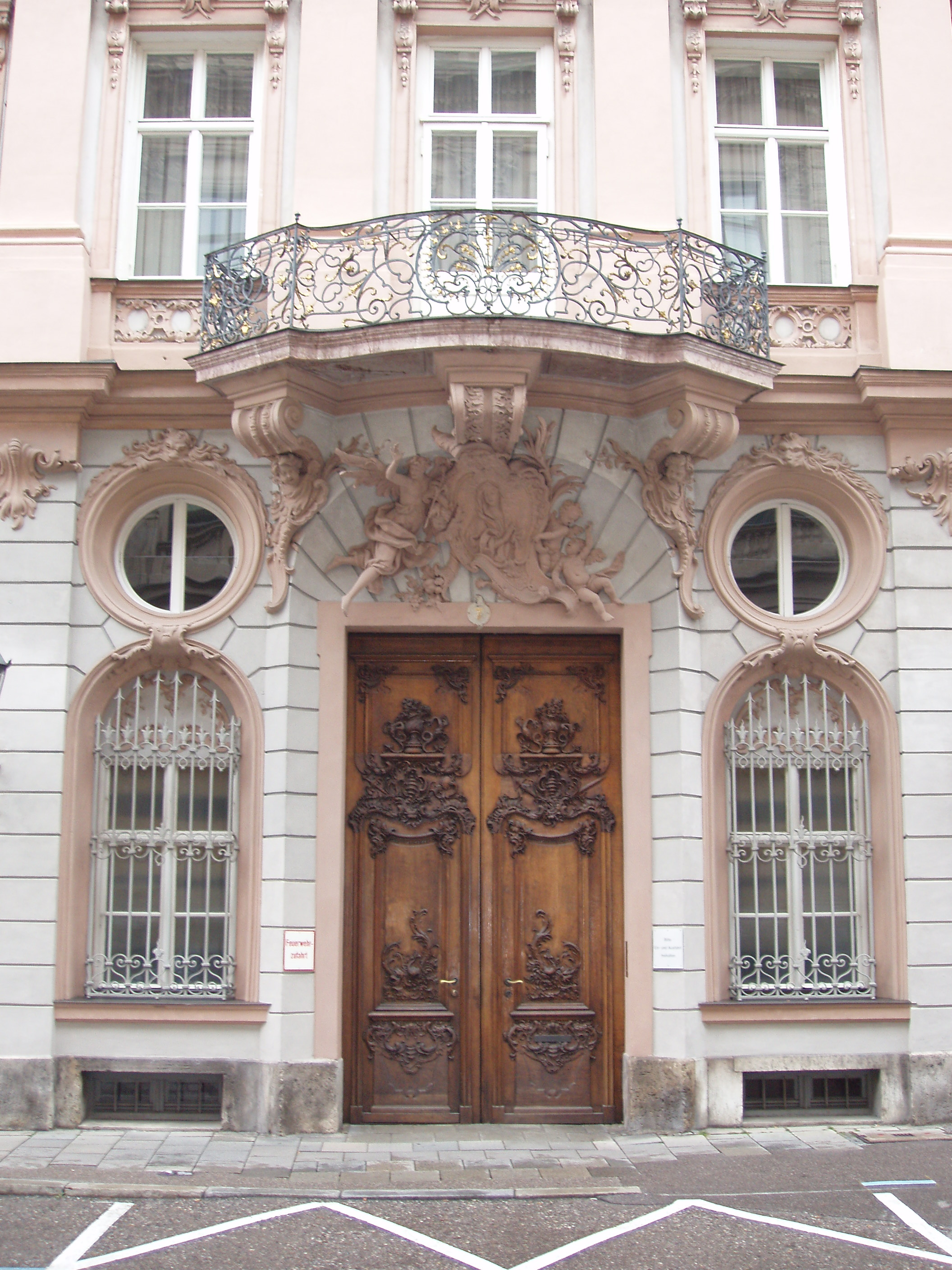
Palais Holnstein, the archbishop's residence

The Archdiocese of Munich and Freising (German: Erzbistum München und Freising, Latin: Archidioecesis Monacensis et Frisingensis) is a Latin Church ecclesiastical territory or diocese of the Catholic Church in Bavaria, Germany. It is governed by the Archbishop of Munich and Freising, who administers the see from the co-cathedral in Munich, the Frauenkirche. The other, much older co-cathedral is Freising Cathedral.

The see was canonically erected in about 739 by Saint Boniface as the Diocese of Freising, and later became a prince-bishopric. The diocese was dissolved in 1803 following the collapse of the Holy Roman Empire, although a titular bishop ruled until April 1, 1818, when Pope Pius VII elevated the diocese to an archdiocese with its new seat in Munich, rather than Freising.

The archdiocese is divided into 40 deaneries with 758 parishes. Its suffragan bishops are those of Augsburg, Passau, and Regensburg.

The most notable archbishop was Joseph Ratzinger, who was elected as Pope Benedict XVI.

The residence of the archbishops of Munich and Freising is the Palais Holnstein in Munich, very close to the Munich Cathedral (Frauendom). The official archives and library for the archdiocese is also very close to the Palais Holnstein.

== See also ==
- Bishops of Freising and Archbishops of Munich and Freising
- Prince-Bishopric of Freising
