= Philip, Duke of Neuburg =

Duke of Palatine-Neuburg from 1505 to 1541

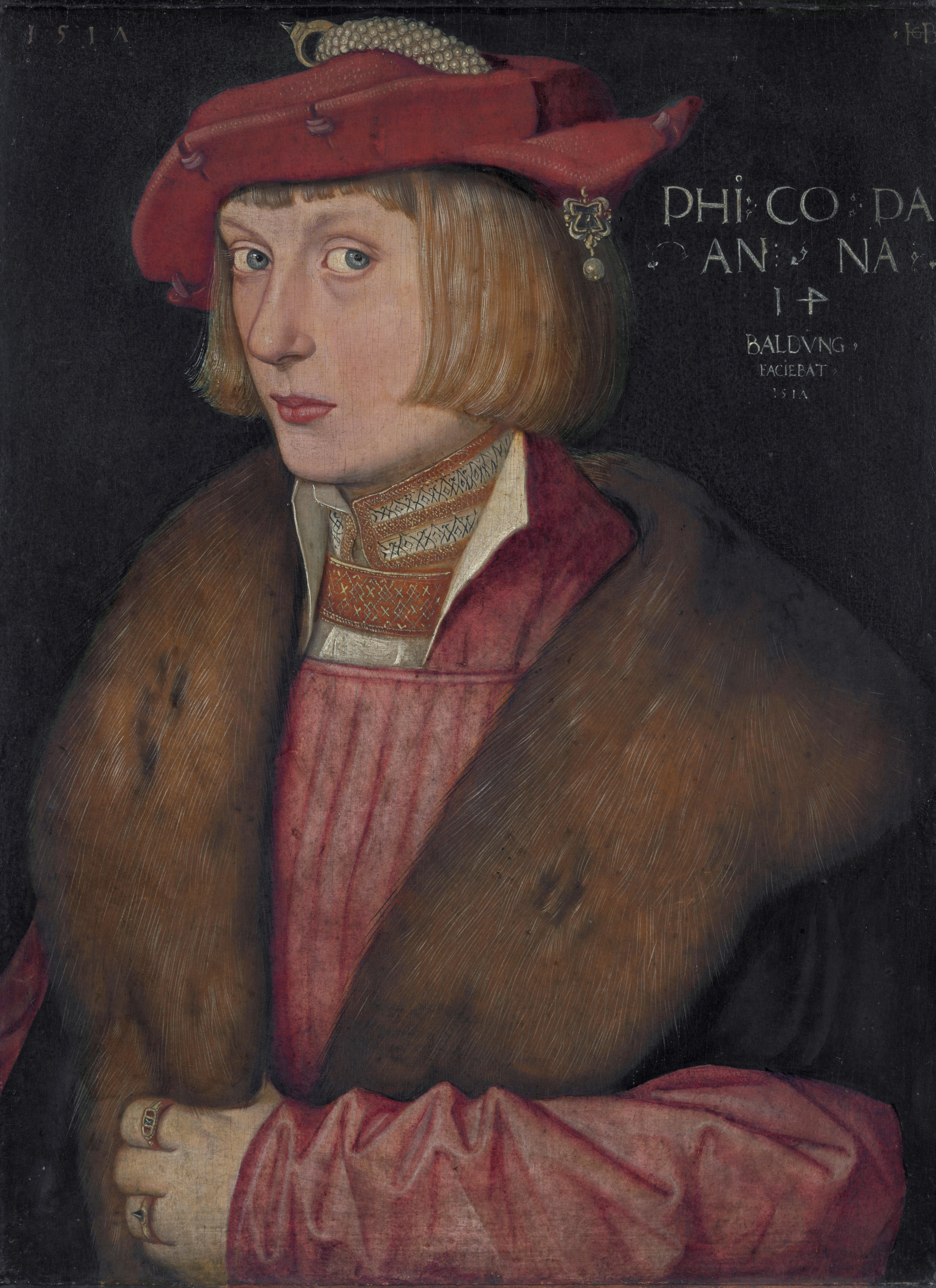
Count Palatine Philip the Warlike (Hans Baldung, 1517)

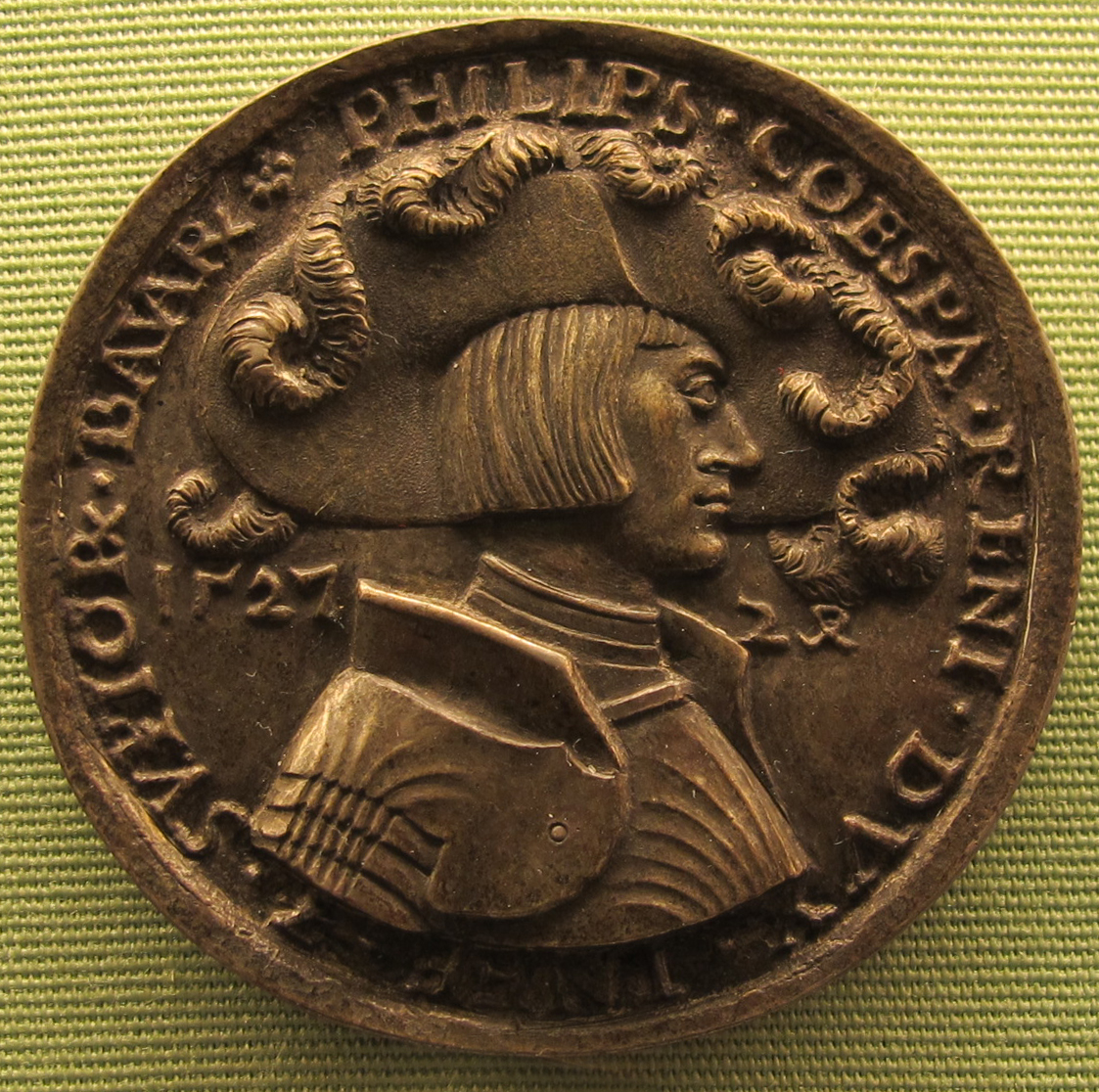
A medal of Hans Daucher portraying Philipp von Pfalz-Neuburg in 1527.

Philip the Contentious (German: Philipp der Streitbare) (12 November 1503, Heidelberg – 4 July 1548, Heidelberg), a member of the Wittelsbach dynasty, was a titular Count Palatine of the Rhine and ruling Duke of Palatinate-Neuburg from 1505 to 1541.

== Life ==
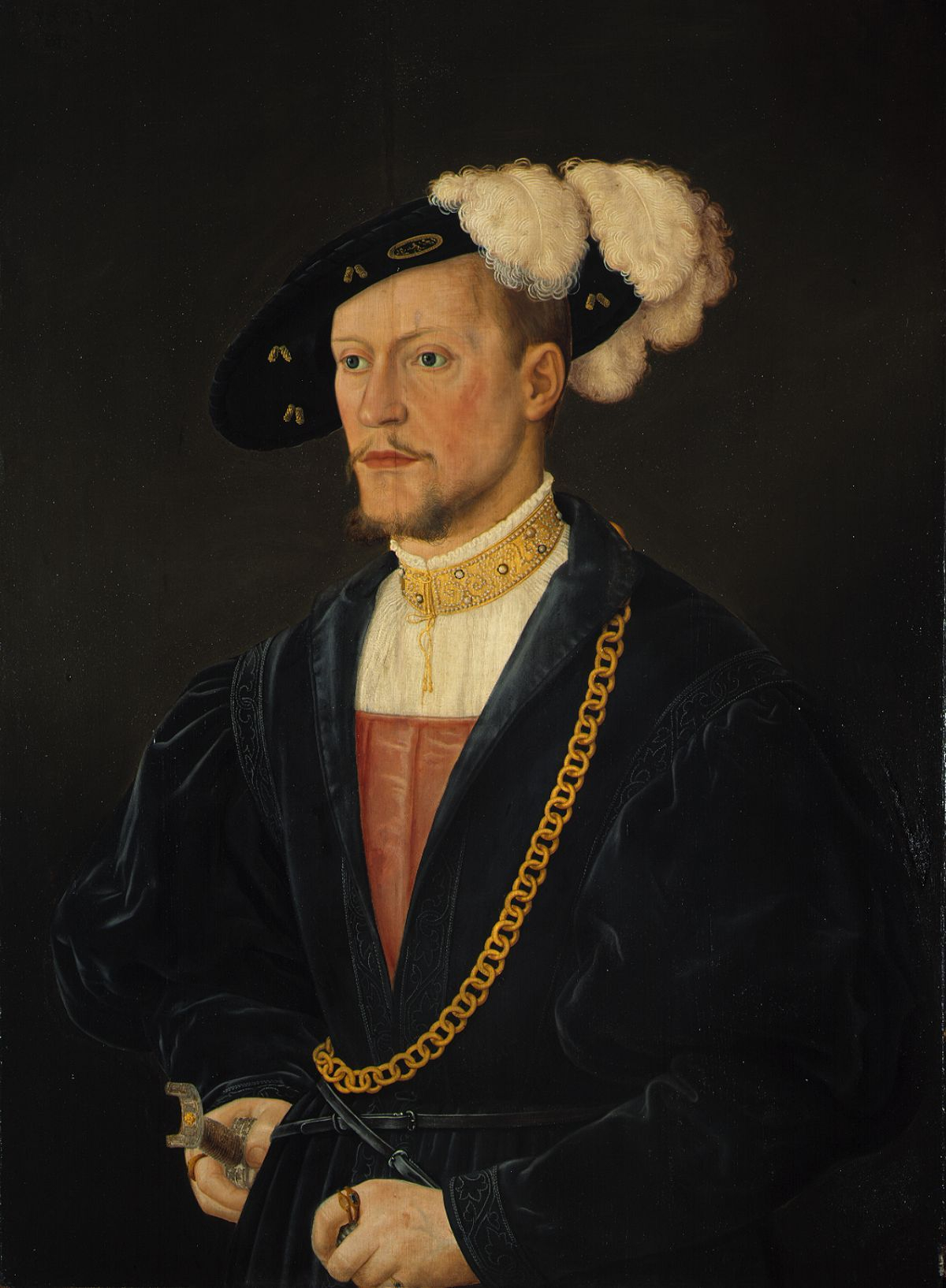
Philip in 1533

Philip was the youngest son of Ruprecht, Count Palatine of the Rhine, and his wife, Elisabeth of Bavaria-Landshut, daughter of George, Duke of Bavaria-Landshut.

Conflicting with imperial law and the inheritance treaty with the dukes of Bavaria-Munich, Duke George had attempted to pass his lands of Bavaria-Landshut to his daughter Elisabeth. This led to the Landshut War of Succession in 1503, in which the forces of Elisabeth and her husband Rupert were defeated. Elisabeth and Rupert died in quick succession in the fall of 1504. In the Arbitration of Cologne in 1505, Emperor Maximilian I awarded, as compensation for the territorial losses, the small state of Palatinate-Neuburg (from the territories of Lower Bavaria) to the two sons of Elisabeth. Philip ruled this territory along with his older brother, Duke Otto Henry.

In 1529, he successfully fought the Turks during the Siege of Vienna at the head of two regiments and was made a Knight of the Order of the Golden Fleece two years later.

On 8 December 1539, Philip visited the court of King Henry VIII of England, with the hope of obtaining the hand of the King's daughter Lady Mary Tudor. This potential match was part of King Henry's plans of an alliance with the Protestant German Princes against the Emperor. For all his intents and purposes, Philip does seem to have been genuinely drawn to Lady Mary for herself. They met on 17 December in Hertford Castle, where he presented her with a gift and kissed her. Such familiarity gave rise to the belief that the two would wed, and the majority of the English court expected a wedding within the coming months.

However, King Henry did not allow this match to succeed, due to the fact that the Duke was related to queen consort Anne of Cleves, Henry’s fourth wife. The Duke was both paternally and maternally her third cousin, sharing as ancestors Frederick II, Elector of Saxony, and Margarete of Austria.

Surprisingly, given their differing religious views, Lady Mary showed affection towards the Duke, as she kissed him out of court. The Duke was later sent back to his land. The plan did not come to fruition. Philip, however, was not deterred, and he visited England three more times; but only once more did he get to see Lady Mary.

== Ancestry ==
Ancestors of Philip, Duke of Neuburg

16. Louis III, Elector Palatine
8. Louis IV, Elector Palatine
17. Matilda of Savoy
4. Philip, Elector Palatine
18. Antipope Felix V
9. Margaret of Savoy
19. Mary of Burgundy
2. Ruprecht of the Palatinate
20. Henry XVI, Duke of Bavaria
10. Louis IX, Duke of Bavaria
21. Margaret of Austria
5. Margaret of Bavaria
22. Frederick II, Elector of Saxony
11. Amalia of Saxony
23. Margaret of Austria
1. Philip, Duke of Palatinate-Neuburg
24. Henry XVI, Duke of Bavaria (= 20)
12. Louis IX, Duke of Bavaria (= 10)
25. Margaret of Austria (= 21)
6. George, Duke of Bavaria
26. Frederick II, Elector of Saxony (= 22)
13. Amalia of Saxony (= 11)
27. Margaret of Austria (= 23)
3. Elisabeth of Bavaria
28. Ladislaus II Jagiellon
14. Casimir IV Jagiellon
29. Sophia of Halshany
7. Hedwig Jagiellon
30. Albert II of Germany
15. Elisabeth of Austria
31. Elizabeth of Luxembourg

== Pop Culture ==
Philip was portrayed by Colin O'Donoghue for The Tudors in 2009 and Johannes Schreiber for Wolf Hall: The Mirror and the Light in 2024.

Philip, Duke of Neuburg House of Wittelsbach Born: 1503 Died: 1548
German royalty
Regnal titles
Preceded by new creation	Duke of Palatinate-Neuburg; 1505–1541	Succeeded by Otto Henry
