= Otto Henry, Elector Palatine =

Elector Palatine from 1556 to 1559

Otto Henry
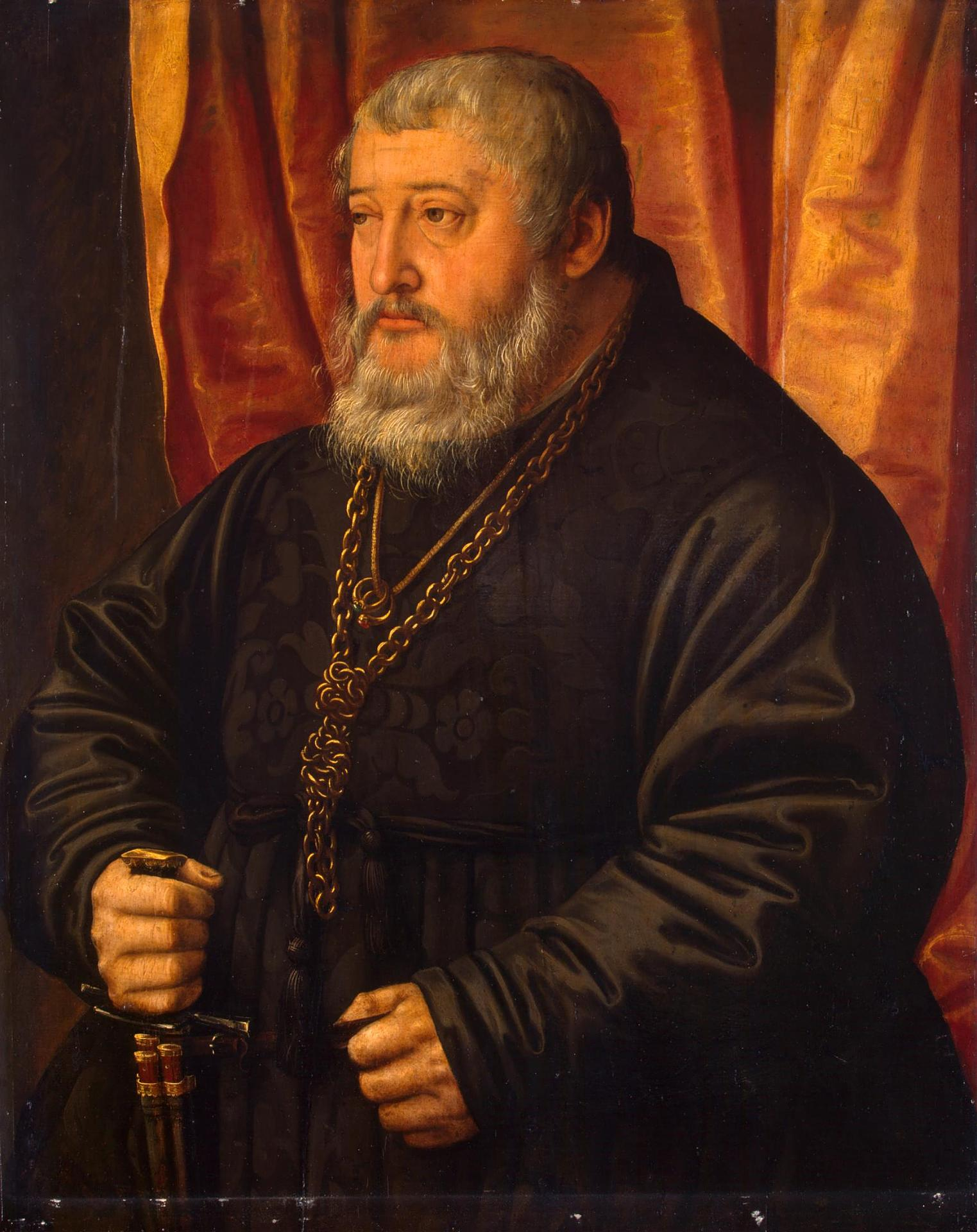
- Portrait by Georg Pencz, 1550

Elector Palatine
- Reign: 26 February 1556 – 12 February 1559
- Predecessor: Frederick II
- Successor: Frederick III
- Born: 10 April 1502; Amberg
- Died: 12 February 1559 (aged 56); Heidelberg
- Spouse: Susanna of Bavaria (m. 1529; died 1543)
- House: Wittelsbach
- Father: Ruprecht of the Palatinate
- Mother: Elisabeth of Bavaria-Landshut
- Religion: Lutheran (from 1540s); Roman Catholic (until 1540s)

Otto-Henry, Elector Palatine, (German: Ottheinrich; 10 April 1502, Amberg – 12 February 1559, Heidelberg) a member of the Wittelsbach dynasty was Count Palatine of Palatinate-Neuburg from 1505 to 1557 and prince elector of the Palatinate from 1556 to 1559. He was a son of Rupert, Count Palatine, third son of Philip, Elector Palatine; and of Elizabeth of Bavaria-Landshut, daughter of George of Bavaria.

== Life ==
As grandson of George of Bavaria, the young Otto Henry became Count Palatine of the new duchy of Palatinate-Neuburg after the Palatinate had lost the Landshut War of Succession against Albert IV, Duke of Bavaria. After the so-called Kölner Spruch (Verdict of Cologne) the duchy was created from the territories north of the Danube for Otto Henry and Philipp, the sons of Ruprecht of the Palatinate. While they were minors, their grandfather Philip, Elector Palatine, ruled the duchy until his death in 1508, followed by Elector Frederick II, their uncle.

In 1541 elector Otto Henry converted to Lutheranism and his palace chapel at Neuburg Castle was the first newly built protestant church of all, consecrated on 25 April 1543 by the reformed theologian Andreas Osiander.

Otto Henry ordered upgrading of Neuburg Castle, patronised the arts and was involved in several conflicts, due to his expensive holding of court a huge burden of debts caused his bankruptcy until he inherited the Electoral Palatinate in 1556. In the 1550s Otto Henry established the Bibliotheca Palatina.

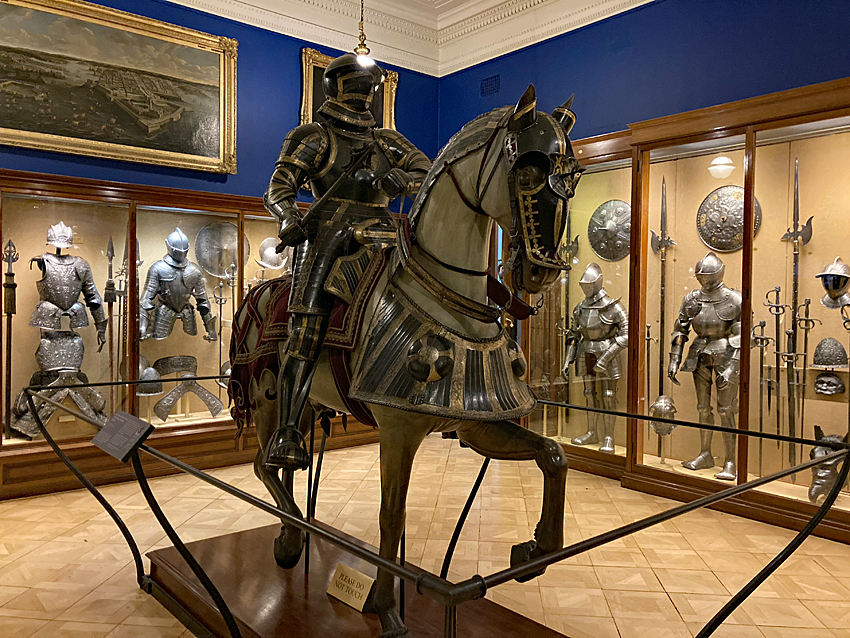
Field armour of Otto Henry

In September 1546 Neuburg was occupied by the troops of Charles V, Holy Roman Emperor as Otto Henry had supported the Schmalkaldic League. In 1552 in occasion of the Peace of Passau Otto Henry could return to Neuburg. As Elector from 1556 he then re-introduced the Protestant Reformation.

Otto Henry married Susanna of Bavaria (1502–43), daughter of Albert IV, Duke of Bavaria, on October 16, 1529 in Neuburg an der Donau. He was her second husband after Casimir, Margrave of Brandenburg-Bayreuth. They had no children, but Susanna brought five of her own children to the marriage. She left him a widower 14 years later in 1543.

Otto Henry died in Heidelberg in 1559. He is buried in the Heiliggeistkirche in Heidelberg.

== Ancestors ==
Ancestors of Otto Henry, Elector Palatine

16. Louis III, Elector Palatine
8. Louis IV, Elector Palatine
17. Matilda of Savoy
4. Philip, Elector Palatine
18. Amadeus VIII of Savoy
9. Margaret of Savoy
19. Mary of Burgundy
2. Ruprecht of the Palatinate
20. Henry XVI, Duke of Bavaria
10. Louis IX, Duke of Bavaria
21. Margaret of Austria
5. Margaret of Bavaria
22. Frederick II, Elector of Saxony
11. Amalia of Saxony
23. Margaret of Austria
1. Otto Henry, Elector Palatine
24. Henry XVI, Duke of Bavaria (= 20)
12. Louis IX, Duke of Bavaria (= 10)
25. Margaret of Austria (= 21)
6. George, Duke of Bavaria
26. Frederick II, Elector of Saxony(= 22)
13. Amalia of Saxony (= 11)
27. Margaret of Austria (= 23)
3. Elisabeth of Bavaria-Landshut
28. Jogaila
14. Casimir IV Jagiellon
29. Sophia of Halshany
7. Hedwig Jagiellon
30. Albert II of Germany
15. Elizabeth of Austria
31. Elizabeth of Luxembourg

Otto Henry, Elector Palatine House of Wittelsbach Born: 1502 Died: 1559
Regnal titles
New title	Count Palatine of Neuburg; 1505–1557	Succeeded by Wolfgang
Preceded by Frederick II	Elector Palatine; 1556–1559	Succeeded by Frederick III
