= Maximilian Joseph von Tarnóczy =

Austrian Cardinal and Archbishop

His Eminence Maximilian Joseph von Tarnóczy
- Cardinal Archbishop of Salzburg
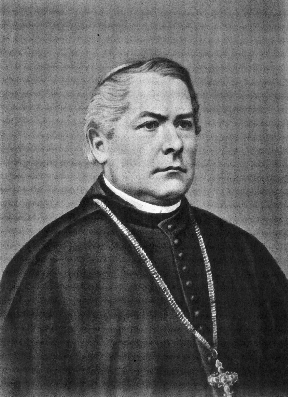
- Church: Roman Catholic
- Archdiocese: Salzburg
- Appointed: 17 February 1851
- In office: 1851–1876
- Predecessor: Friedrich Johannes Jacob Celestin von Schwarzenberg
- Successor: Franz Albert Eder
- Other post: Cardinal-Priest of Santa Maria in Ara Coeli

Orders
- Ordination: 25 October 1829
- Consecration: 1 June 1851 by Friedrich Johannes Jacob Celestin von Schwarzenberg
- Created cardinal: 22 December 1873 by Pope Pius IX
- Rank: Cardinal Priest

Personal details
- Born: 24 October 1806 Schwaz, Austrian Empire
- Died: 4 April 1876 (aged 69)

Maximilian Joseph von Tarnóczy (Hungarian: Tarnózy Miksa) (24 October 1806 – 4 April 1876) was an Austrian Cardinal and Archbishop.

He was born in Schwaz on 24 October 1806, the son of Franz Xaver von Tarnóczy (Tarnóczy Ferenc), a Hungarian-Bavarian nobleman (1756–1837) and his second wife, Catherine von Sprinzenberg (1776–1837). He studied in Innsbruck and Salzburg and in 1829 became a priest. In 1832 he received a doctorate in theology and worked as a teacher at the Salzburg Lyceum.

In 1850 he was appointed Archbishop of Salzburg, a position he held until his death in 1876.

As Archbishop of Salzburg, Tarnóczy wielded huge power in Rome, so much so that when he arrived at the First Vatican Council, Pope Pius IX welcomed him with the words, "Ecco il mezzo papa, che puo far dei vescovi" ("See the demi-Pope, who can make Bishops"). The Archbishop of Salzburg had the power to ordain and consecrate the Bishop of Gurk; a power Tarnóczy exercised when he consecrated Prince-Bishop Valentin Wiery in 1858.

Pope Pius IX elevated Tarnóczy to the rank of Cardinal the consistory of 22 December 1873 and appointed him Cardinal-Priest of Santa Maria in Aracoeli.

He died on 4 April 1876 at age 69.

Catholic Church titles
Preceded by Friedrich von Schwarzenberg	Archbishop of Salzburg; 1850–1876	Succeeded by Franz de Paula Albert Eder
Preceded by Giuseppe Milesi Pironi Ferretti	Cardinal-Priest of Santa Maria in Aracoeli; 1873–1876	Succeeded by Mieczyslaw Halka Ledóchowski
