= George the Rich =

George the Rich may refer to:

- George, Duke of Bavaria (1455–1503), known as Georg der Reiche
- George, Duke of Saxony (1471–1539), also known as Georg der Reiche
