= War of the Succession of Landshut =

Dispute between German Dutchies (1503–1505)

Date	1503–05
Location	Germany
Result	Victory by Bavaria-Munich
Territorial changes	Bavaria-Landshut fell to Duchy of Bavaria-Munich; Territories ceded to: Duchy of Palatinate-Neuburg; Imperial City of Nuremberg; County of Tyrol

Belligerents
Bavaria-Munich	Bavaria-Landshut; County Palatine of the Rhine

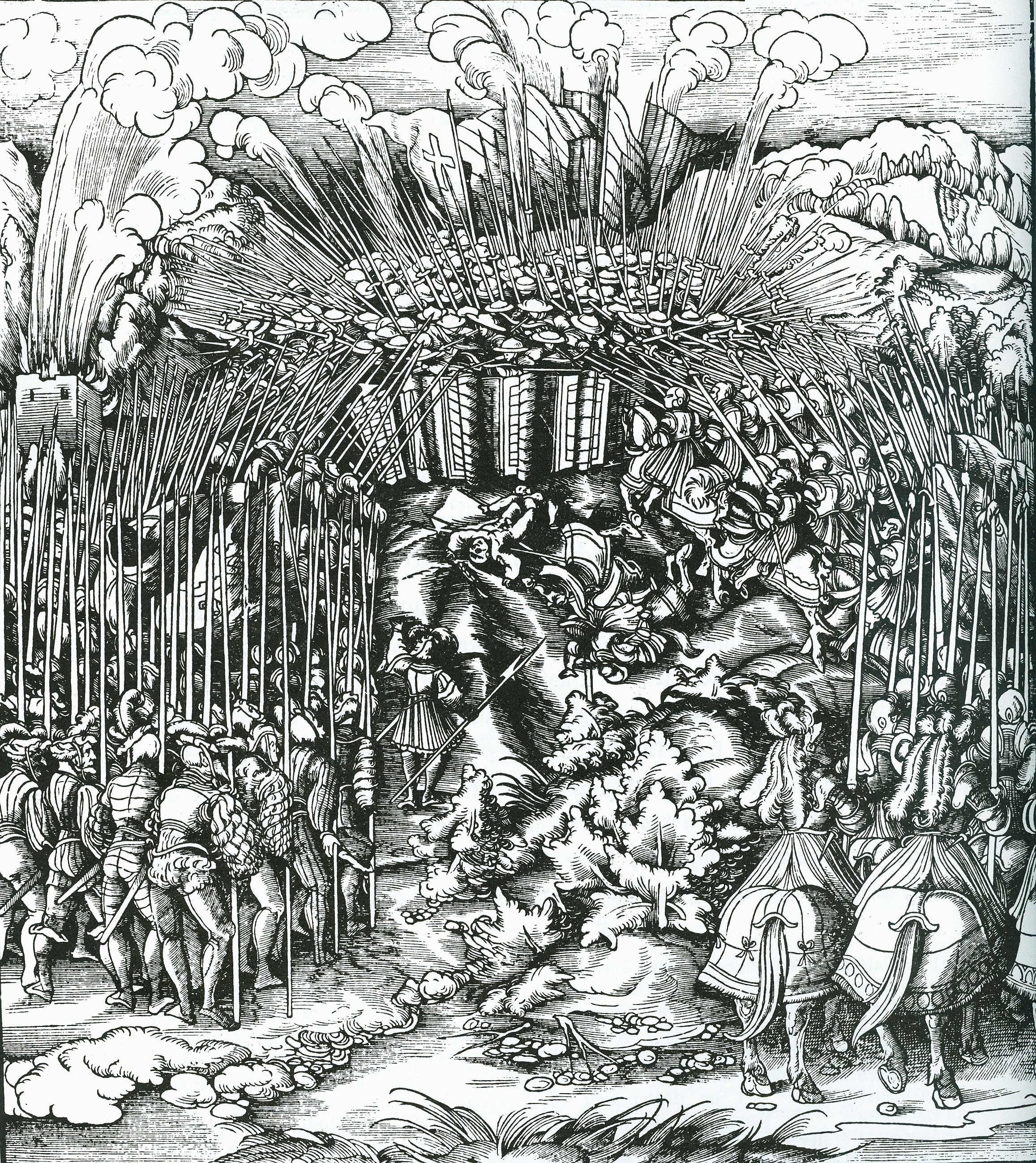
Emperor Maximilian personally led his troops at the battle of Wenzenbach in 1504.

The War of the Succession of Landshut (Landshuter Erbfolgekrieg in German) resulted from a dispute between the Duchies of Bavaria-Munich (Bayern-München in German) and Bavaria-Landshut (Bayern-Landshut).

== Background ==
George, Duke of Bavaria-Landshut, nicknamed 'the Rich', and his wife Hedwig (Jadwiga) of Poland had no surviving son, so George named his daughter Elisabeth as his heir in his testament of 19 September 1496, along with her fiancé Ruprecht of the Palatinate and any future sons the couple would produce. Their marriage was concluded on 10 February 1499. Elisabeth was Ruprecht's cousin, Ruprecht's mother Margarete of Bavaria-Landshut was George's sister. Nonetheless, this arrangement stood in contradiction to the Treaty of Pavia (1329), the dynastic law of succession of the House of Wittelsbach. It stated that if one branch should become extinct in the male line, the other would inherit. Also, according imperial law a Duchy would fall to the Emperor, should a line fail to produce male heirs; the Emperor would then assign the duchy to a successor.

Duke Albert IV of Bavaria-Munich did not accept George's decision to disinherit him. After George's death on 1 December 1503, this unresolved dispute escalated into the War of the Succession of Landshut, especially after George had named Elisabeth's husband Ruprecht his co-regent shortly before his death.

On 13 December 1503, a Landtag took place in Landshut which had been called by George. There, Albrecht reaffirmed his claims through envoys, while Ruprecht, who had already taken up residence in Landshut attended in person. It became evident that many of the attendants that had already opposed Albrecht in the Löwlerbund still harboured reservations against him.

The Lower Bavarian Landstände formed a regency council and appealed to the Reichskammergericht. King Maximilian I summoned the parties to Augsburg for a meeting on 5 February 1504. There and in following sessions, he claimed territories from both sides as compensation for mediating the conflict. In April 1504, Albrecht declared his will to part with the territorries of Kufstein, Kitzbühel and Rattenberg, in turn receiving Maximilian's support consisting of 10,000 troops and monetary assistance. On 23 April, Maximilian formally granted Lower Bavaria to the dukes of Munich.

In the meantime, Elisabeth and Ruprecht had dissolved the regency council in Landshut on 17 April. Ruprecht's Palatine troops occupied Landshut, the residential city of Burghausen and various other towns. After Ruprecht's father, the Elector Palatine Philipp the Upright, had declared support for his son, war was waged on Palatine territorries as well. He was supported even by the Kings of France and Bohemia as well as the Margrave of Baden, bringing his troop count up to around 30,000.

Albrecht, on the other hand, had 60,000 troops at his disposal. Next to Maximilian's force he was supported by the Swabian League, Duke Ulrich of Wurttemberg, Margrave Frederick I of Brandenburg-Ansbach and the Free Imperial City of Nuremberg, who sent 5,000 men. King Maximilian declared an Imperial Ban on Ruprecht and his father Philipp on 5 May 1504.

The War of the Succession of Landshut marked the end of a decades-long conflict inside the Wittelsbach dynasty. Main protagonists were the lines of Bavaria-Landshut and Bavaria-Munich, as well as King Maximilian I of the Habsburg dynasty. In the beginning, it was Albrecht IV of Munich who led a more offensive course in opposition to the imperial Habsburg family, but the dukes of Landshut were no less hostile to the Habsburgs. The traditionally close bond between dukes George and Albrecht rapidly deteriorated after 1493. Albrecht's succession seemed safe with the birth of his son William. George on the other hand tried to secure his own succession through a political change of course: he allied with the Electoral Palatinate, which was not acceptable for Albrecht. King Maximilian supported the latter, who was married to his sister Kunigunde of Austria, not the least due to his own ambitions that always had the dynastic claim to hegemony of the Habsburg dynasty at heart.

== Development of the War ==
With his own army of 12,000 infantry and 2,000 knights, Albrecht laid siege to Landau an der Isar on 21 June 1504 and took it with artillery bombardment. Landau was burned down on 29 June. On 13 July, the first notable engagement took place on the fields of Altdorf near Landshut between Albrecht's and Ruprecht's troops. There, Albrecht's lieutenant Götz von Berlichingen famously lost his hand. The battle ended with a victory of Albrecht's troops. Ruprecht had to fall back into the city of Landshut, where he succumbed to dysentery on 20 August. His widow Elisabeth continued the war nonetheless.

On 9 August, Palatine troops took Kufstein, Braunau fell 14 days later after heavy battle. In Upper Palatinate, the troops of Margrave Friedrich conquered Freystadt and devastated Waldsassen Abbey. A detachment of troops from Wunsiedel attacked Ebnath and burned the village to the ground. Castle Ebnath was bombarded which led to its wooden first floor burning down. Under the command of Paul von Hirschberg and Oswald von Seckendorf, the castle could withstand the onslaught. On 8 August 1504, the margravial troops set up camp in a forest between Neusorg and Schwarzenreuth, where they were ambushed by Palatine men. According to historical records, 1,000 men fell. The Free City of Nuremberg took Lauf, Hersbruck and Altdorf bei Nürnberg. During the course of the war, many villages around Landshut were burned down, such as Ergolding, Haimhausen and Landau an der Isar.

Duke Albrecht unsuccessfully laid siege to Neuburg an der Donau after his victory at Landshut. A Bohemian army came marching through Upper Palatinate, but Maximilian's army was to the rescue in time so that the united armies could win the only larger battle of the war, the Battle of Wenzenbach, to north-east of Regensburg, on 12 September 1504. Three days after the battle, Elisabeth died.

In the name of her and her husband's under-age sons, the Palatine councillors continued the war, and their general Georg von Wisbeck managed to conquer Vohburg an der Donau. Maximilian took Kufstein, receiving the surrender of Rattenberg, Schwaz, Zillertal, Brixental, Traunstein, Kitzbühel and Reichenhall. Von Wisbeck laid siege to Munich in vain and afterwards sacked Neumarkt-Sankt Veit, Schärding, Pfarrkirchen, Vilsbiburg and Burghausen, which he burned down completely.

The war led to destructions in the Palatinate, too, because almost all neighbours of the Elector Palatine had taken up arms against him. Limburg Abbey was burned down to the ground on 30 August 1504 by troops of Count Emich IX of Leiningen. Around 300 Palatine settlements were destroyed. On 10 September 1504, Philipp of the Palatinate agreed to a ceasefire. A first attempt at peace negotiations broke down on 10 December 1504 in Mittenwald. After von Wisbeck had suffered defeat near Gangkofen on 23 January 1505 at the hands of Bavarian troops, a ceasefire came into effect on 9 February.

== Aftermath ==
The war ended in 1505 with a decision through arbitration by Emperor Maximilian I on 30 July 1505 at the Diet of Cologne. The victory of the forces of Bavaria-Munich, as well as the death of Archbishop of Mainz Berthold of Henneberg, also gave the King of the Romans the political capital necessary to dissolve the hostile Imperial government.

George's grandsons Otto Henry and Philip retained Palatinate-Neuburg (Junge Pfalz), a fragmented region from the upper Danube extending from above Franconia to the northern part of the Upper Palatinate. Neuburg an der Donau was chosen as the capital of the new state. Because the two heirs had not yet reached their majority, Frederick II, Count Palatine of the Rhine, served as regent in a caretaker regime. The rest of the territory went to the Munich line of the House of Wittelsbach. For the Electoral Palatinate the war led to territorial losses as well: most of its Alsatian possessions fell into the hands of the Habsburgs, further territorries were taken over by Hesse and Wurttemberg, leading to a considerable diminshment of Wittelsbach territory in Bavaria as well as in the Palatinate.

The emperor took the territory around Kufstein for himself as reward for his mediation; the Imperial City of Nuremberg gained important territories to the east of the city, including Lauf, Hersbruck and Altdorf. As count palatine, Otto-Heinrich spent huge sums of money to build a palace at Neuburg an der Donau. Through inheritance, he later became Elector Palatine, where his additions to Heidelberg Castle, known as the Ottheinrichsbau, made him one of the most important builders of the German Renaissance.

== Literature ==
- Rudolf Ebneth, Peter Schmid (ed.): Der Landshuter Erbfolgekrieg. An der Wende vom Mittelalter zur Neuzeit. Kartenhaus Kollektiv Grafische Dienste, Regensburg 2004, ISBN 3-88246-266-3 .
- Reinhard Stauber: Der Landshuter Erbfolgekrieg – Selbstzerstörung des Hauses Wittelsbach? In: Jörg Peltzer, Bernd Schneidmüller, Stefan Weinfurter, Alfried Wieczorek (eds.): Die Wittelsbacher und die Kurpfalz im Mittelalter. Eine Erfolgsgeschichte? Schnell + Steiner, Regensburg 2013, ISBN 978-3-7954-2645-3, Sp 207–230.
- Gustav Voit, Zwei Schadenslisten aus dem Baierischen Erbfolgekrieg 1504/1505, in: Mitteilungen des Vereins für Geschichte der Stadt Nürnberg. 65. 1978, page 185ff., MDZ
