= Sixtus of Tannberg =

Prince-Bishop of Freising from 1474 to 1495

- Prince-Bishop of Freising
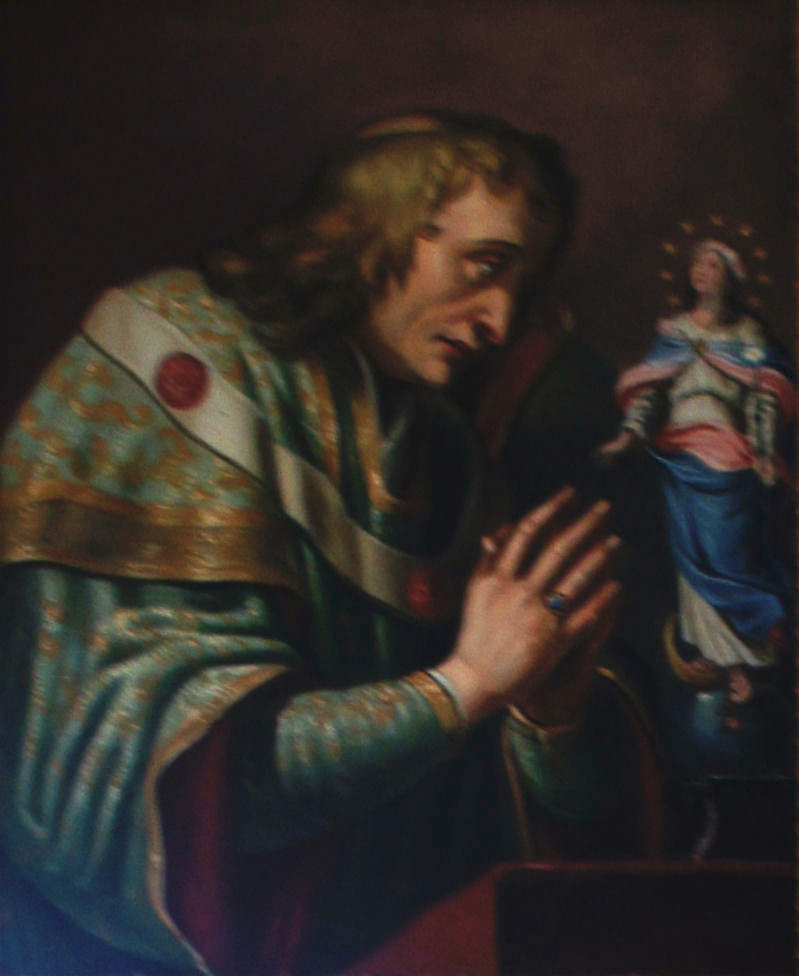
- Church: Catholic Church
- Diocese: Freising
- See: Freising
- In office: 12 January 1474 - 14 July 1495
- Predecessor: Johann Tulbeck
- Successor: Ruprecht of the Palatinate
- Previous post: Bishop of Gurk (1470-1474)

Orders
- Consecration: 10 April 1474 by Archbishop Bernhard von Rohr

Personal details
- Died: 14 July 1495 Frankenthal
- Buried: Freising Cathedral

Sixtus of Tannberg (died 14 July 1495 in Frankenthal) was a 15th-century Bishop who served as Bishop of Gurk from 1470 to 1474 and as Prince-Bishop of Freising from 1474 to 1495.

== Life ==
Sixtus was a son of Johann Tannberg of Aurolzmünster and Ursula von Rohr, a sister of Archbishop Bernhard von Rohr. In 1442 he was admitted in Freising as an Exspektant and in 1456 he joined the local Cathedral Chapter. He studied at Padua for almost eight years and became a doctor of both laws. In 1458 he became provost in Isen in Upper Bavaria and in 1466 pastor of Laufen. Allegedly he was also chancellor of Bishop Johann Tulbeck of Freising and canon at Salzburg.

After the death of Ulrich III Sonnenberger, the Archduchy of Austria and the Archdiocese of Salzburg again had an argument over who was entitled to appoint a new Bishop of Gurk. Archbishop Bernhard von Rohr appointed Sixtus and this appointment was confirmed by the pope in 1470. Emperor Frederick III would have preferred the appointment of Lawrence of Freiberg, who was Provost of Gurk at the time. Both candidates were summoned, under threat of excommunication, to come to Augsburg, where the dispute was settled by Cardinal Mark, who was Patriarch of Aquileia and Papal Nuncio to Germany.

Sixtus was chancellor of the Prince-Bishop Johann Tulbeck of Freising, who resigned in 1473 in favor of Tannberg. Tannberg resigned as Bishop of Gurk, leaving the post to Lawrence of Freiberg. Between 1481 and 1483, during Tannberg's reign, a vault was designed, which still exists today, for the nave of the Freising Cathedral. Tannberg was very pious and led to several diocesan synods and introduced profound reforms of the clergy in his diocese. He also founded in 1484 his own Cathedral Choir, who would contribute to more worthy church services. He died on 14 July 1495 in the monastery of the Canons Regular of St. Augustine in Frankenthal, near Worms. He was buried in the Freising Cathedral.

== Bibliography ==
- Anton Landersdorfer, Sixtus von Tannberg, Bischof von Freising (1474–1495), Georg Schwaiger (ed.), Christenleben im Wandel der Zeit, vol. 1, Lebensbilder aus der Geschichte des Bistums Freising, Wewel, Munich, 1987 ISBN 3-87904-154-7, (Wewelbuch 154), p. 103–113.
- Jakob Obersteiner, Die Bischöfe von Gurk - 1072–1822, Verlag des Geschichtsvereines für Kärnten, Klagenfurt, 1969, (Aus Forschung und Kunst, issue 5 ISSN 0067-0642), p. 249–251.

Catholic Church titles
Preceded by Ulrich III Sonnenberger	Bishop of Gurk; 1470 – 1474	Succeeded by Lawrence of Freiburg
Preceded by Johann Tulbeck	Prince-Bishop of Freising; 1474 – 1495	Succeeded by Ruprecht of the Palatinate
