= Valentin Wiery =

Austrian Catholic bishop

- Bishop of Gurk
- Church: Catholic Church
- Diocese: Diocese of Gurk
- In office: 30 October 1858 – 29 December 1880
- Predecessor: Adalbert Lidmansky
- Successor: Peter Funder

Orders
- Ordination: 24 August 1835
- Consecration: 21 November 1858 by Maximilian Joseph von Tarnóczy

Personal details
- Born: 12 February 1813 St. Marein (in present-day Wolfsberg), Duchy of Carinthia, Austrian Empire
- Died: 29 December 1880 (aged 67)

Valentin Wiery (12 February 1813 – 29 December 1880) was an Austrian Catholic bishop.

Wiery was born in St Marein in Wolfsberg, and was educated locally (learning the Slovenian language). He then studied at the gymnasia in Görz and in Klagenfurt, where he pursued the philosophy curriculum. He then entered the seminary at Klagenfurt where he completed his training in theology. He was ordained on 24 August 1835. Recognizing his talent, the bishop of Lavant, Ignaz Franz Zimmermann (1824–1843), sent him to the graduate seminary for priests in Vienna, where he obtained a doctorate in theology.

At Lavant, he was diocesan superintendent of schools. He was named a canon of the cathedral of Lavant on 20 October 1844, and canon of the cathedral of Salzburg on 20 November 1851.

Canon Wiery was appointed Prince-Bishop of Gurk on 30 October 1858, and confirmed on 20 November. He was consecrated Bishop of Gurk on 21 November 1858 by Maximilian Joseph von Tarnóczy, Archbishop of Salzburg, assisted by Bishops Anton Martin Slomšek, Bishop of Lavant; Ottokar Maria von Attems, Bishop of Seckau; and Balthasar Schitter, Titular Bishop of Dulma. He was enthroned in the cathedral at Klagenfurt on 8 December 1858. His consecration was considered a display of Tarnóczy's personal power, and Wiery came to be considered a prominent modern Prince-Bishop.

He took part in the First Vatican Council in 1869–1870.

Wiery died on 29 December 1880.

== Sources ==
- Katholische Kirche Diözese Gurk (1861). Geistlicher Personalstand der Diözese Gurk: im Jahre 1861. Klagenfurt: Johann Leon 1861.
- Remigius Ritzler; Pirminus Sefrin (1978). Hierarchia catholica Medii et recentioris aevi (in Latin). Vol. VIII (1846–1903). Il Messaggero di S. Antonio. p. 296.
- Wurzbach, Constant von (1888). Biographisches lexikon des kaiserthums Oesterreich. Volume 56. Wien: K. K. Hof- und staatsdruckerei, 1888. pp. 33-34.

Catholic Church titles
Preceded by Adalbert Lidmansky	Bishop of Gurk; 1858 – 1880	Succeeded by Peter Funder
