= Elisabeth of Bavaria (1478–1504) =

German duchess (1478–1504)

- Born: 1478
- Died: 15 September 1504 (aged 25–26)
- Buried: Seligenthal monastery in Landshut
- Noble family: House of Wittelsbach
- Spouse: Ruprecht of the Palatinate
- Father: George the Rich of Bavaria-Landshut
- Mother: Hedwig Jagiellon, Duchess of Bavaria

Elisabeth of Bavaria (1478 – 15 September 1504) was a member of the House of Wittelsbach and, by marriage, Electress of the Palatinate. After her father's death, she was also Duchess of Bavaria-Landshut.

She was the daughter of Duke George the Rich and his wife Hedwig Jagiellonica. After the death of her brother Louis in 1496, the Duchy of Bavaria-Landshut was without a male heir. The Wittelsbach House Treaties of 1392 and 1450 prescribed that the territory of Bavaria-Landshut should be divided among the other Bavarian duchies, if the line should die out in the male line. Duke George ignored these treaties and left his territory to his daughter in a last will and testament dated 19 September 1496.

In 1499 Elisabeth married Ruprecht of the Palatinate. She had twins, Rupert and George; they both died in 1504. Her other sons, Philip, Duke of Palatinate-Neuburg and Otto Henry, Elector Palatine survived into adulthood.

In 1503 George appointed Ruprecht as governor of Lower Bavaria. George died on 1 December 1503 and she disbanded the Regency Council of the Estates. Her resolute approach contributed to the outbreak of the Landshut War of Succession.

Her opponent Albrecht IV of Bavaria-Munich had stronger allies, and soon Emperor Maximilian I joined his side. Her husband died of dysentery on 20 August 1504. Elizabeth continued the war, and had her troops occupy the towns of Landshut, Dingolfing and Moosburg an der Isar. She was declared an outlaw. Her Bohemian allies suffered a decisive defeat at Wenzenbach on 12 September 1504.

Three days later, she, too, died of dysentery. She was interred in the Cistercian monastery of Seligenthal in Landshut.

== References and sources ==
- Nikolaus Orlop: Alle Herrscher Bayerns, second edition, LangenMüller in der F. A. Herbig Verlagsbuchhandlung GmbH, Munich, 2006, ISBN 3-7844-3075-9, pp. 346–349
