= Hedwig Jagiellon, Duchess of Bavaria =

Hedwig Jagiellon
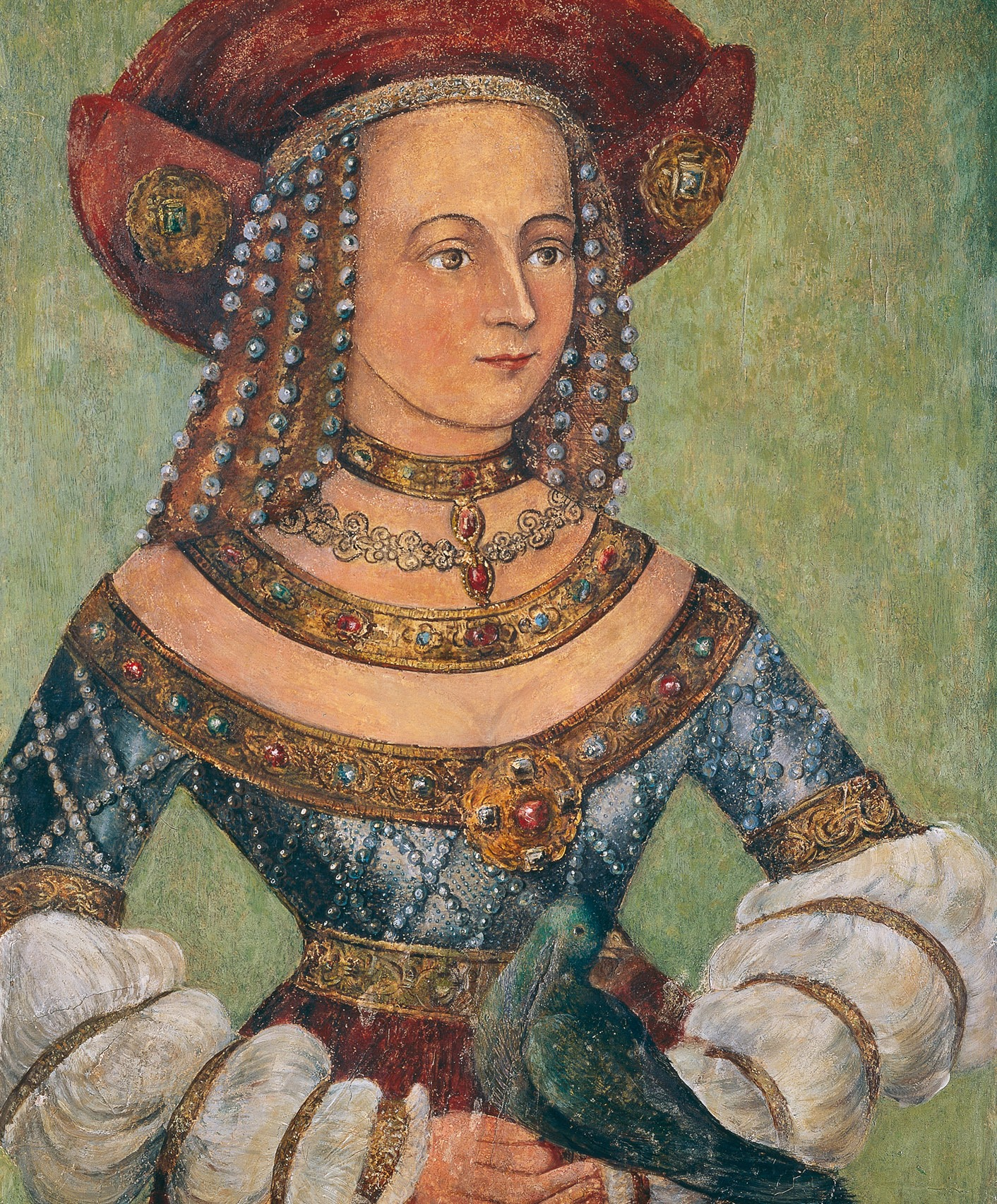
- Anonymous portrait, 15th century

Duchess consort of Bavaria-Landshut
- Tenure: 18 January 1479 – 18 February 1502
- Born: 21 September 1457; Kraków
- Died: 18 February 1502 (aged 44); Burghausen
- Burial: Raitenhaslach Monastery
- Spouse: George, Duke of Bavaria-Landshut
- Issue among others...: Elisabeth, Countess Palatine of the Rhine; Margaret of Bavaria-Landshut
- Dynasty: Jagiellon
- Father: Casimir IV Jagiellon
- Mother: Elizabeth of Austria

Hedwig Jagiellon (Polish: Jadwiga Jagiellonka; Lithuanian: Jadvyga Jogailaitė, German: Hedwig Jagiellonica; 21 September 1457 – 18 February 1502), baptized as Hedwigis, was a princess of the Kingdom of Poland and of the Grand Duchy of Lithuania, and member of the Jagiellonian dynasty. She was Duchess of Bavaria by marriage to George, Duke of Bavaria.

Born in Kraków, she was the eldest daughter of King Casimir IV of Poland and Archduchess Elisabeth of Austria.

== Life ==
In 1468, her hand was requested by Matthias Corvinus, King of Hungary, who on 8 April of that year sent Protas Černohorský z Boskovic, Bishop of Olomouc as his representative. With this marriage, the Hungarian ruler hoped to gain a valuable ally against his rival for the Bohemian throne, George of Poděbrady. At the same time, negotiations began for a marriage between the second daughter of Casimir IV, Sophia with Archduke Maximilian of Austria, son and heir of Emperor Frederick III; thus, the Polish King would guarantee that future rulers of Austria and Hungary would be his descendants. The efforts of Matthias Corvinus for Hedwig's hand were supported by both the Emperor and Pope Paul II.

However, since 1462, Casimir IV had had an alliance with George of Poděbrady, which caused Pope Pius II suspicion after the Thirteen Years' War, during which Poland fought against the Teutonic Order. In addition, the princess's mother Queen Elizabeth was also against the match, stating that Matthias is a peasant, a midget, a Vlach, a dog, simply not worthy of her (pl: Matyasz chłop, kurczek, Wołoszyn, pies, niegodziem jej). Despite this, Bishop Protas was chosen to be godfather at the baptism of the new son of King Casimir IV, born on 27 April 1467, who was named Frederick after the Emperor.

In 1469, the Catholic party of the Kingdom of Bohemia formally offered the crown to Matthias Corvinus. George of Poděbrady sought the support of Poland, promising the succession of the eldest son of Casimir IV, Vladislaus in exchange of their help. Corvinus, fearing this Polish-Bohemian alliance, again requested the hand of Hedwig, but was refused.

On 20 October 1470, Casimir IV and Frederick signed a treaty in the city of Graz, and a possible marriage between Hedwig and Maximilian was also discussed.

Matthias Corvinus asked the hand of Hedwig again in July 1471 and in September 1473 until finally, a definitive refusal was made by Queen Elizabeth. At the beginning of 1473, two counselors sent by Albert IV, Duke of Bavaria-Munich arrived in Poland with a marriage proposal; however, Casimir IV refused the offer because at that time, he was already negotiating a marriage between his eldest daughter and George, son and heir of Louis IX, Duke of Bavaria-Landshut.

Casimir IV, in order to protect his south-western borders with the Kingdom of Bohemia (subject to the rivalry between his son Vladislaus and Matthias Corvinus), decided to enter into a closer alliance with Bavaria. In 1473, the Polish deputies Stanisław Kurozwęcki and Paweł Jasieński were sent to the Landshut court to begin talks for a marriage between Hedwig and George. As a result, on 7 or 10 September 1474, Duke Louis IX of Bavaria-Landshut sent an official message asking Hedwig's hand for his son. Negotiations took place in the cities of Łęczyca and Radom, where on 30 December, Hedwig agreed to marry George. The next day, the marriage contract was signed. Hedwig received as a dowry to the amount of 32,000 Hungarian złoty, payable in 5 installments over the next five years. The cost of the trip of the Polish princess to her new home reached 100,000 złoty.

Due to the fact that the future spouses were closely related (Hedwig's maternal grandfather Albert V of Austria was a brother of George's paternal grandmother, Margaret of Austria), the Polish Royal Chancellor Uriel Górka travelled to Rome in 1475 to seek the required dispensation, which was granted by Pope Sixtus IV on 26 May of that year.

Hedwig arrived with her family in Poznań, where on 10 October 1475, she said goodbye to them. With a large retinue of approximately 1,200 knights, she arrived in Wittenberg on 23 October. She was accompanied, among others, by Anna, widow of Bolesław II, Duke of Cieszyn.

On 14 November 1475, Hedwig and her retinue finally arrived in Landshut, an event which inspired the famous medieval pageant Landshut Wedding. The wedding ceremony took place that day at St. Martin's Church, with the service being officiated by Bernhard von Rohr, Archbishop of Salzburg. Several German rulers attended the wedding, including Emperor Frederick III and his son Maximilian, Albrecht III Achilles, Elector of Brandenburg, Sigismund, Archduke of Further Austria and ruler of Tirol, Philip, Elector Palatine, Albert, Margrave of Baden-Hachberg, Counts Ulrich V of Württemberg-Stuttgart and Eberhard V of Württemberg-Urach, Landgrave Louis I of Leuchtenberg and Count Otto of Henneberg-Aschach. The wedding feast was held the next day, with 9,000 people attending.

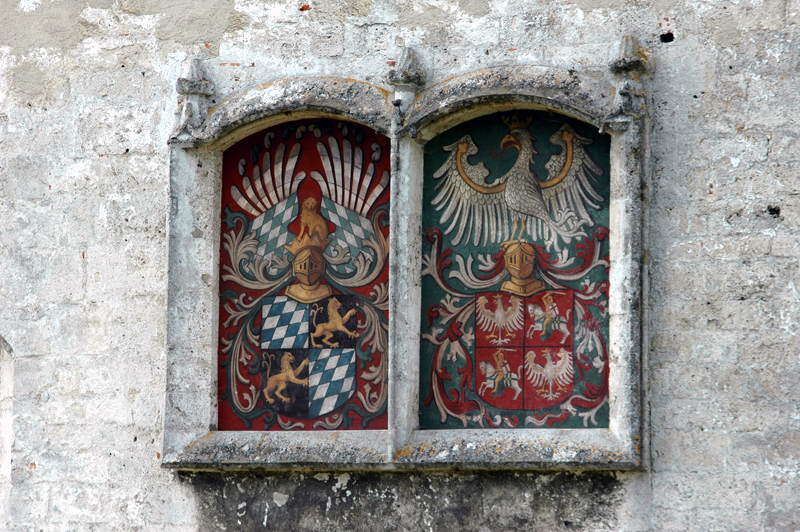
Coats of arms of Duke George and Hedwig Jagiellon, Burghausen Castle.

In 1479, Hedwig became Duchess-consort of Bavaria-Landshut after the death of her father-in-law. Her marriage was unsuccessful; her husband was a known alcoholic and womanizer. In 1485, George banished his wife from the Ducal court in Landshut and placed her in Burghausen Castle, where she lived with her own court and numerous servants, but – according to contemporary chroniclers – deprived of all the pleasures of the world and comforted only with her loneliness. It is not known whether she was accompanied by her children in her exile.

She died unexpectedly on 18 February 1502 at Burghausen Castle. She was buried in the Cistercian monastery of Raitenhaslach near Burghausen. When the monastery was secularized in 1803, her tombstone was destroyed. However, there is a commemorative stone in the floor of the Church in the place where her grave was previously located.

Hedwig, who signed her letters as geborene Königin von Polen (Queen of Poland by birth), didn't maintain close contact with her family. On 31 January 1503, her brother, King Alexander of Poland, wrote to her husband that he hadn't known that Hedwig had died eleven months previously.

== Issue ==
Hedwig and George had five children:

1. Louis of Bavaria-Landshut (1476 – bef. 1496).
2. Rupert of Bavaria-Landshut (1477 – died in infancy).
3. Elisabeth of Bavaria-Landshut (1478 – 15 September 1504), married on 10 February 1499 to Rupert, Count Palatine of the Rhine.
4. Margaret of Bavaria-Landshut (1480 – 6 January 1531), Abbess of the Benedictine monastery in Neuburg an der Donau (1509–1521).
5. Wolfgang of Bavaria-Landshut (born and died 1482).

== Ancestry ==
Ancestors of Hedwig Jagiellon

16. Gediminas of Lithuania
8. Algirdas, King of Lithuania
17. Jewna of Polotsk
4. Władysław II Jagiełło, King of Poland
18. Alexander I, Grand Prince of Tver
9. Uliana Alexandrovna of Tver
19. Anastasia Yuryevna of Halych
2. Casimir IV Jagiellon, King of Poland
20. Ivan Olgimuntovich, Prince of Halshany
10. Andrew Ivanovich, Prince of Halshany
21. Agrippina
5. Sophia of Halshany
22. Dimitri of Drutsk (possibly Demetrius I Starshy)
11. Alexandra Dimitrijewna of Drutsk
1. Hedwig Jagiellon
24. Albert III, Duke of Austria
12. Albert IV, Duke of Austria
25. Beatrice of Hohenzollern-Nuremberg
6. Albert II of Germany
26. Albert I, Duke of Bavaria
13. Johanna Sophia of Bavaria
27. Margaret of Brieg
3. Elizabeth of Austria
28. Charles IV, Holy Roman Emperor
14. Sigismund, Holy Roman Emperor
29. Elizabeth of Pomerania
7. Elizabeth of Luxembourg
30. Hermann II of Celje
15. Barbara of Celje
31. Anna, Countess of Schaunberg

== Notes ==
Hedwig Jagiellon House of Jagiellon Born: 21 September 1457 Died: 18 February 1502
Royal titles
Preceded by Amalia of Saxony	Duchess of Bavaria-Landshut; 18 January 1479 – 18 February 1502	Vacant Title next held by Kunigunde of Austria
