= Palatinate-Neuburg =

Territory of the Holy Roman Empire (1505–1808)

Coordinates: 48°44′N 11°11′E

Duchy of Palatinate-Neuburg Herzogtum Pfalz-Neuburg (German)
- 1505–1808
- Banner of Palatinate-Neuburg Coat of arms (1609–1685)

- Palatinate-Neuburg within the Holy Roman Empire in 1618.
- Status: State of the Holy Roman Empire (until 1806)
- Capital: Neuburg an der Donau
- Common languages: Austro-Bavarian
- Religion: Lutheranism; Roman Catholicism; Counts Palatine were Roman Catholic until 1541, then Lutheran until 1614, then again Roman Catholic since 1614.
- Government: Principality
- Count Palatine
  - 1505–57: Otto Henry
  - 1557–69: Wolfgang
  - 1653–90: Philip William
  - 1742–99: Charles Theodore
- Historical era: Middle Ages
  - Established: 30 July 1505
  - In personal union with the Electorate of the Palatinate: 1556–1557
  - Ceded to Zweibrücken: 1557
  - Sulzbach separated: 1614
  - Merged with the Electorate of the Palatinate: 1685
  - Disestablished: 1808
Preceded by	Succeeded by
Bavaria-Landshut	Electoral Palatinate

Palatinate-Neuburg (German: Herzogtum Pfalz-Neuburg) was a territory of the Holy Roman Empire, founded in 1505 by a branch of the House of Wittelsbach. Its capital was Neuburg an der Donau. Its area was about 2,750 km^{2}, with a population of some 100,000.

== History ==
Timeline of Palatine Neuburg
← / Duchy was created; ← / Ceded to another family; ← / Joined the Protestant Union; ← / Duchy was abolished

The Duchy of Palatinate-Neuburg was created in 1505 as the result of the Landshut War of Succession and existed until 1799 or 1808. After the so-called Kölner Spruch (Verdict of Cologne) the duchy was created from the territories north of the Danube for Otto Henry and Philipp, the sons of Ruprecht of the Palatinate. While they were minors, their grandfather Philip, Elector Palatine, ruled the duchy until his death in 1508, followed by Elector Frederick II. In 1541, Count Palatine Otto Henry converted to Lutheranism and his palace chapel at Neuburg Castle was the first newly built Protestant church of all, consecrated on 25 April 1543 by the reformed theologian Andreas Osiander.

In 1556, Otto Henry became the Elector Palatine and the next year ceded his duchy (the so-called Young Palatinate) to Wolfgang, Count Palatine of Zweibrücken. The eldest son of Wolfgang, Philipp Louis, founded in 1569 the elder line of Palatine Zweibrücken-Neuburg, from which the Palatine Sulzbach lineage was separated in 1614.

Palatinate-Neuburg joined the Protestant Union in 1608. In 1609, the United Duchies of Julich-Cleves-Berg were in dispute following the death of the childless John William. Count Palatine Wolfgang Wilhelm claimed the territory and fought in the War of the Julich Succession, converting to Catholicism midway through in order to secure alliances. As a result, Palatine-Neuburg and the Duchies of Julich and Berg would be held in personal union. This was formalized in the Treaty of Xanten.

In 1800, the duchy was invaded by France and on June 26, 1800, the Habsburg, Württemberg and Bavarian armies fought a battle there. After fighting for most of a day, the Coalition armies withdrew. Neuburg was occupied by the French, and General Ney established his headquarters in the castle there.

The Duchy of Palatinate-Neuburg was abolished in 1808. In the partition of Bavaria in 1837, Palatinate-Neuburg was joined with Swabia but became a part of Upper Bavaria in the 1970s.

== Dukes of Palatinate-Neuburg ==
- Two brothers, first under regency of Frederick II, Elector Palatine
  - Otto Henry, 1505–57 (Elector Palatine from 1556 until death)
  - Philipp, 1505–41

=== House of Palatinate-Zweibrücken-Neuburg ===
- Wolfgang, 1557–69
- Philipp Ludwig, 1569–1614 (also Duke of Jülich and Berg in 1614)
- Wolfgang Wilhelm, 1614–53 (also Duke of Jülich and Berg from 1614)
- Philip William, 1653–90 (also Duke of Jülich and Berg from 1653 and Elector Palatine from 1685)
- Johann Wilhelm, 1690–1716 (also Duke of Jülich and Berg from 1679 and Elector Palatine from 1690)
- Charles Philip, 1716–42 (also Duke of Jülich and Berg and Elector Palatine from 1716)

With the death of Elector Charles Philip in 1742 all his territories including the state of Palatinate-Neuburg passed to the Palatinate-Sulzbach line of the Wittelsbach dynasty. Charles Theodor of the Sulzbach line was a descendant of Augustus, Count Palatine of Sulzbach, a brother of Wolfgang Wilhelm.

=== House of Palatinate-Sulzbach ===
- Charles Theodore, 1742–99 (Elector Palatine from 1742, Elector of Bavaria from 1777)

=== House of Palatinate-Zweibrücken-Birkenfeld ===
- Maximilian Joseph, 1799–1808, (Elector of Bavaria from 1799)

== Gallery ==
Coat of Arms of Wolfgang Wilhelm, Count Palatine of Neuburg

Coat of Arms of Philip William, Johann Wilhelm and Charles Philip, Electors Palatine

== See also ==
- Palatinate
