= Bishop of Gurk =

Diocesan bishop in the Roman Catholic Church

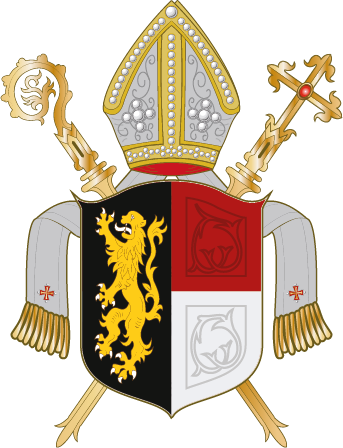
Diocesan coat of arms

The Bishop of Gurk is the head of the Roman Catholic Diocese of Gurk, which was established by Archbishop Gebhard of Salzburg, in 1072, as the first suffragan bishop in the Duchy of Carinthia.

Initially performing only the functions of an archiepiscopal vicar, or auxiliary bishop, the bishops of Gurk did not receive a small episcopal territory until 17 July 1131, when Archbishop Conrad of Salzburg defined the boundaries of the diocese. The bishops of Gurk were elevated to the rank of prince-bishops by Emperor Frederick III on 15 December 1460, however, this title remained honorific and did not involve any immediate statehood. In the course of the Josephinist reforms in 1783, the bishops' see was relocated to the Carinthian capital Klagenfurt and the diocese significantly enlarged.

== List of Bishops ==
=== Bishops of Gurk (until 1460) ===
- Günther von Krappfeld (1072 - 1090)
- Berthold von Zeltschach (1090 - 1106)
- Hiltebold (1106 - 1131)
- Roman (I) (1131 - 1167)
- Heinrich (I) (1167 - 1174)
- Roman II von Leibnitz (1174 - 1179)
- Hermann von Ortenburg (1179 - 1180)
- Dietrich von Albeck (1180 - 1194) (von Kellnitz)
- Wernher (1194 - 1195)
- Ekkehard (1196 - 1200)
- Walther Truchsess von Waldburg (1200 - 1213) (von Vatz)
- Otto (1214)
- Heinrich von Pettau (1214 - 1217)
- Ulschalk (1217 - 1220)
- Ulrich (I) (1221 - 1253)
- Dietrich von Marburg (1253 - 1278)
- Johann von Ennsthal (1279 - 1281)

Konrad von Lupburg (1282) (declined election)

- Hartnid von Lichtenstein-Offenberg (1283 - 1298)
- Heinrich von Helfenberg (1299 - 1326)
- Gerold von Friesach (1326 - 1333)
- Lorenz von Brunne (1334 - 1337) (von Grimming)
- Konrad von Salmansweiler (1337 - 1344)
- Ulrich von Wildhaus (1345 - 1351)
- Paul von Jägerndorf (1352 - 1359)
- Johann von Platzheim-Lenzburg (1359 - 1364)
- Johann von Töckheim (1364 - 1376)
- Johann von Mayrhofer (1376 - 1402)
- Konrad von Hebenstreit (1402 - 1411)
- Ernst Auer (1411 - 1432)

Lorenz von Lichtenberg (1432 - 1436) (Antibishop)

- Johann V Schallermann (1433 - 1453)
- Ulrich IV Sonnberger (1453 - 1460)

=== Prince-Bishops of Gurk (1460 - 1787) ===
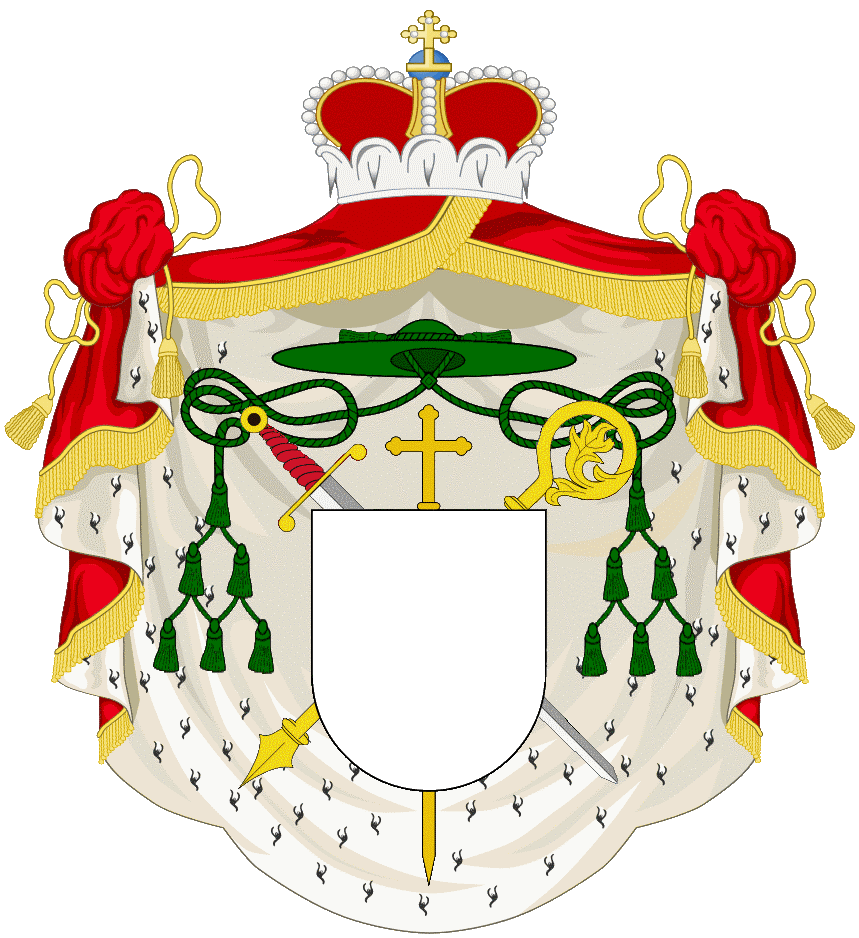
Arms of a Prince-Bishop

- Ulrich (IV) Sonnberger (1460 - 1469)
- Sixtus von Tannberg (1470 - 1474)
- Lorenz von Freiberg (1472 - 1487)
- Georg Kolberger (1490) (nur erwählt)
- Raimund Peraudi (1491 - 1505)
- Matthäus Lang von Wellenburg (1505 - 1522)
- Hieronymus Balbus (1522 - 1526)
- Antonius Salamanca-Hoyos (1526 - 1551)
- Johann VI von Schönburg (1552 - 1555)
- Urban Sagstetter (1556 - 1573)
- Christoph Andreas von Spaur (1574 - 1603)
- Johann Jakob von Lamberg (1603 - 1630)
- Sebastian von Lodron (1630 - 1643)
- Franz von Lodron (1643 - 1652)
- Sigismund Franz, Archduke of Austria (1653 - 1665)
- Wenzeslaus Graf von Thun (1665 - 1673)
- Polykarp Graf von Kienburg (1673 - 1675)
- Johann von Goess (1675 - 1696)
- Otto de la Bourde (1697 - 1708)
- Jakob Maximilian Graf von Thun (1709 - 1741)
- Joseph Maria Graf von Thun (1741 - 1762)
- Hieronymus II Graf von Colloredo (1761 - 1772)
- Joseph Graf von Auersperg (1772 - 1784)
- Franz Xaver Altgraf von Salm-Reifferscheidt-Krautheim (1783 - 1787)

=== Bishops of Gurk-Klagenfurt (from 1787) ===
Franz Xaver Altgraf von Salm-Reifferscheidt-Krautheim, with new diocesan title (1787 - 1822)

- Jakob Peregrin Paulitsch (1824 - 1827)
- Georg Mayer (1827 - 1840)
- Franz Anton Gindl (1841)
- Adalbert Lidmansky (1842 - 1858)
- Valentin Wiery (1858 - 1880)
- Peter Funder (1881 - 1886)
- Josef Kahn (1887 - 1910)
- Balthasar Kaltner (1910 - 1914)
- Adam Hefter (1914 - 1939)
- Andreas Rohracher (1939 - 1945) (Vicar capitular)
- Joseph Köstner (1945 - 1981)
- Egon Kapellari (1982 - 2001)
- Alois Schwarz (22 May 2001 - 17 May 2018)
- Josef Marketz (since 2020)

== See also ==
- Roman Catholic Diocese of Gurk

== Sources ==
- Gams, Pius Bonifatius (1873). Series episcoporum Ecclesiae catholicae: quotquot innotuerunt a beato Petro apostolo (in Latin). Ratisbon: Typis et Sumptibus Georgii Josephi Manz. pp. 278–279.
- Eubel, Conradus, ed. (1913). Hierarchia catholica (in Latin). Vol. 1 (Tomus I) (second ed.). Münster: Libreria Regensbergiana. pp. 269–270. archived.
- Eubel, Conradus, ed. (1914). Hierarchia catholica (in Latin). Vol. 2 (Tomus II) (second ed.). Münster: Libreria Regensbergiana. archived
- Eubel, Conradus; Gulik, Guilelmus, eds. (1923). Hierarchia catholica (in Latin). Vol. 3 (Tomus III) (second ed.). Münster: Libreria Regensbergiana.
- Gauchat, Patritius (Patrice) (1935). Hierarchia catholica. Vol. 4 (Tomus IV) (1592–1667). Münster: Libraria Regensbergiana.
- Ritzler, Remigius; Sefrin, Pirminus (1952). Hierarchia catholica medii et recentis aevi. Vol. 5 (Tomus V) (1667–1730). Patavii: Messagero di S. Antonio.
- Ritzler, Remigius; Sefrin, Pirminus (1958). Hierarchia catholica medii et recentis aevi. Vol. 6 (Tomus VI) (1730–1799). Patavii: Messagero di S. Antonio.
- Ritzler, Remigius; Sefrin, Pirminus (1968). Hierarchia Catholica medii et recentioris aevi (in Latin). Vol. VII (1800–1846). Monasterii: Libreria Regensburgiana.
- Remigius Ritzler; Pirminus Sefrin (1978). Hierarchia catholica Medii et recentioris aevi (in Latin). Vol. VIII (1846–1903). Il Messaggero di S. Antonio.
- Pięta, Zenon (2002). Hierarchia catholica medii et recentioris aevi (in Latin). Vol. IX (1903–1922). Padua: Messagero di San Antonio. ISBN 978-88-250-1000-8.

=== Studies ===
- Ankershofen, Gottlieb Freiherr von (1849). Urkunden-Regesten zur Geschichte Kärntens (Fortsetzung).. (in German and Latin). Wien: K. u. k. Hof- und Staatsdruckerei 1849 [Akademie der Wissenschaften herausgegebenen Archivs für Kunde österreichischer Geschichtsquellen, vol. 2].
- Freed, John B. (2016). Frederick Barbarossa: The Prince and the Myth. Yale University Press.
- Jaksch von Wartenhorst, August; Wiessner, Hermann (1896). Monumenta historica Ducatus Carinthiae: Geschichtliche Denkmäler des Herzogthumes Kärnten, Volume 1: Die Gurker Geschichtsquellen, 864–1232. (in German and Latin). Klagenfurt: Commissionsverlag von F. v. Kleinmayr, 1896. Vol. 2: Die Gurker Geschichtsquellen (Schluss) 1233-1269 Klagenfurt: Kleinmayr, 1898.
- Schroll, Beda (1885), "Series episcoporum et s.r.i. principum Gurkensium," (in German), in: Archiv für Vaterländische Geschichte und Topographie, Volume 15 (Klagenfurt 1885), pp. 3–43.

External links

- David M. Cheney, Catholic-hierarchy.org, Diocese of Gurk ^{[self-published]}
