= Elizabeth of Austria (1436–1505) =

Queen of Poland from 1454 to 1492

- Elizabeth depicted on a family tree, 1506

Queen consort of Poland Grand Duchess consort of Lithuania
- Tenure: 10 February 1454 – 7 June 1492
- Coronation: 10 February 1454
- Born: c. 1436; Vienna
- Died: 30 August 1505 (aged 68–69); Kraków
- Burial: Wawel Cathedral
- Spouse: Casimir IV of Poland (m. 1454; died 1492)
- Issue: Vladislas II of Hungary; Hedwig, Duchess of Bavaria; Saint Casimir; John I Albert of Poland; Alexander Jagiellon; Sigismund I the Old; Anna, Duchess of Pomerania; Barbara, Duchess of Saxony; Sophia, Margravine of Brandenburg
- House: Habsburg
- Father: Albert II of Germany
- Mother: Elisabeth of Bohemia

Elizabeth of Austria (German: Elisabeth von Habsburg; Polish: Elżbieta Rakuszanka; Lithuanian: Elžbieta Habsburgaitė; c. 1436 – 30 August 1505) was Queen of Poland and Grand Duchess of Lithuania as the wife of King Casimir IV of Poland. Orphaned at an early age, she spent her childhood in the court of Holy Roman Emperor Frederick III. As one of the three surviving grandchildren of Emperor Sigismund, she had a strong claim to the kingdoms of Hungary and Bohemia. That made her an attractive bride for a Polish prince. The Polish nobility, seeking to increase Polish influence in Hungary and Bohemia, pursued marriage with Elizabeth since she was born and finally succeeded in 1454. Her marriage to Casimir was one of the most successful royal marriages in Poland. She gave birth to thirteen children, eleven of whom survived to adulthood. Four of her sons were crowned as kings.

== Early life ==
=== Tumultuous childhood ===
Elisabeth was the daughter of Albert II of Germany, Archduke of Austria, and his wife Elizabeth of Luxembourg, daughter of Emperor Sigismund. The exact date of her birth is unknown and has been variously provided between 1436 and early 1439. Her elder brother was born in February 1435. Polish chronicler Jan Długosz mentioned that Polish envoys traveled to Vienna in autumn 1436 to negotiate with Emperor Sigismund a marriage between his granddaughters, Anne and Elisabeth, who were considered heirs to the thrones of Bohemia and Hungary, and Polish princes Władysław and Casimir. While the negotiations ended without a decisive agreement, they allowed historians to conclude that Elisabeth was born in the first half of 1436.

Elisabeth's early life was marked by political turmoil. After the death of Emperor Sigismund in December 1437, Elisabeth's father was crowned as King of Hungary and Bohemia. His Bohemian title was challenged by the Hussites who promoted Polish prince Casimir IV Jagiellon as their king and a war erupted. Polish diplomats continued to pursue the plan for a marriage between Casimir and Elisabeth, who would bring Bohemia as a dowry. King Albert received the diplomats coolly as he had no intentions of surrendering his claims to Bohemia. In March 1439, Elisabeth's sister, Anne, was betrothed to William III, Landgrave of Thuringia, son of Frederick I, Elector of Saxony, and was sent to live at the Saxonian court.

King Albert died in October 1439 after a brief campaign against the Ottoman Empire. His pregnant widow considered herself to be the only rightful heir of Emperor Sigismund and fought to crown her son Ladislaus the Posthumous as King of Hungary while Hungarian nobles selected Polish King Władysław III. Princess Elisabeth's nanny Helene Kottannerin stole the Holy Crown of Hungary and brought it to Queen Elisabeth in Komárno. Three-month-old Ladislaus was crowned on 15 May 1440, but that did not stop the civil war. For their safety and protection, the two children of Albert and Elisabeth were placed in the care of Frederick III, elected but not crowned Holy Roman Emperor. As part of the agreement Elisabeth was betrothed to Frederick, nephew of Frederick III and son of Frederick II, Elector of Saxony, and Margaret of Austria.

=== At the emperor's court ===
Elisabeth and Ladislaus were initially cared for by Anna von Pottendorf at the Forchtenstein Castle. When Queen Elisabeth died in December 1442, Emperor Frederick III continued to care for the orphans who spent most of their time in Graz and Wiener Neustadt. The opposition accused the Emperor of neglecting the children, but that could be just political propaganda. Emperor Frederick III was known to be emotionally distant and frugal, but he also provided both children with a good education. Enea Silvio Piccolomini, the emperor's secretary and future Pope Pius II, wrote De liberorum educatione as instruction for educating the children.

A 1973 study of Elisabeth's remains revealed that she most likely had spinal tuberculosis at a young age. This left her skeleton visibly deformed, with an s-shaped spine, misaligned jaw, deformed thorax and her head cocked permanently to the right. The permanent tilt of her head led to stunted development of the right side of her face. Her face was narrow with a large chin. However, as her later life and frequent pregnancies showed, she was of overall good health.

In 1447, Frederick III proposed to marry Elisabeth to Charles, son of Philip the Good, Duke of Burgundy. Philip had purchased Luxembourg from Elisabeth of Bohemia. Frederick III offered 70,000 ducats, as the dowry of Elisabeth, in exchange for Luxembourg, but Philip demanded 120,000 ducats and the negotiations fell through. For unknown reasons, Elisabeth's scheduled wedding to Frederick of Saxony, negotiated by her mother Queen Elisabeth, did not take place despite a wedding treaty signed in July 1450.

After the death of Władysław III of Poland in the Battle of Varna in 1444, Hungarian nobles recognized Elisabeth's brother Ladislaus the Posthumous as their king. However, the Emperor refused to allow Ladislaus to leave his court. Political ambitions of Ulrich II, Count of Celje, cousin of Queen Elisabeth, led him to demand the release of the children into his custody. In December 1451, when the Emperor traveled to Rome to be officially crowned as the Holy Roman Emperor, he took Ladislaus with him but left Elisabeth in Vienna. Austrian nobles rebelled against Frederick III and transferred Elisabeth into the care of Ulrich. Elisabeth made a tearful public appeal in a city square calling for help to her and her brother, neglected and held virtual captive by the Emperor. When Frederick III returned in June 1452, Austrian nobles forced him to release Ladislaus to Ulrich in September 1452.

== Polish queen ==
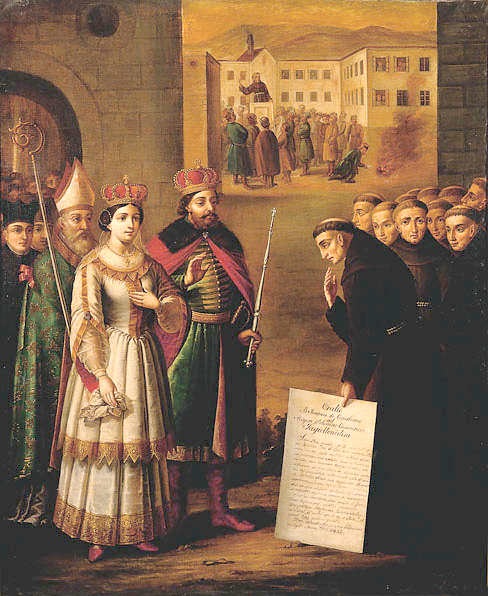
Elizabeth and her husband, Casimir IV of Poland, meeting Saint John of Capistrano

=== Wedding and family life ===
In August 1452, preparing for the Thirteen Years' War (1454–66) with the Teutonic Knights, the Poles sent an embassy to Vienna to once again negotiate marriage between Elisabeth and now-king Casimir IV of Poland. Ulrich II, Count of Celje, who now had custody of Elisabeth, received the proposal favorably and sent two of his men to Poland. The formal wedding agreement was reached in August 1453 in Wrocław in the presence of Polish and Austrian nobles. According to the agreement, Elisabeth's dowry, guaranteed by her brother King Ladislaus the Posthumous, was 100,000 Hungarian golden coins. The dowry was secured by lands in Austria, Hungary and Bohemia. In turn, Casimir guaranteed Koło, Opoczno, Przedecz as well as a monthly sum of 5,000 golden coins from the Bochnia and Wieliczka Salt Mines. Elisabeth had to renounce her claims to lands of Austrian rulers; the renunciation would not apply if her brother Ladislaus died without a male heir.

Elisabeth's dowry was not paid immediately and that gave her the pretext to claim the Hungarian and Bohemian crowns. Eventually, Elisabeth received two-thirds of her dowry—it was paid in 1471 and 1472 by Frederick III, Holy Roman Emperor. The third of her dowry secured by lands in Bohemia was forgiven when her son Vladislaus II became King of Bohemia. Casimir compensated for the delayed dowry and provided his wife with financial security when in December 1461, after the death of Queen Sophia, he transferred a number of royal lands in Sophia's possessions to Elisabeth, including Korczyn, Wiślica, Żarnowiec, Radom, Jedlnia, Kozienice, Chęciny, Łęczyca, Kłodawa, Pyzdry, Konin, Inowrocław. In 1467, she renounced her claim to the Duchy of Luxembourg to Charles the Bold, Duke of Burgundy, whose father had bought the territory in 1443 from Elisabeth, Duchess of Luxembourg.

Elisabeth arrived to Poland in February 1454 with a retinue of nine hundred riders. Reportedly, Casimir was informed that Elisabeth was not an attractive lady and was reconsidering the marriage, but bowed to the pressure of his court. On February 9, Elisabeth arrived at Kraków and was met by Casimir and his mother Sophia of Halshany. The next day, 18-year-old Elisabeth married 27-year-old Casimir and was crowned Queen of Poland. Their 38-year marriage was happy and Elisabeth, despite frequent pregnancies, accompanied her husband on almost all travels, including about thirty visits to the Grand Duchy of Lithuania. They would separate infrequently and for short periods of time when Casimir lived in war camps. Their first child, Vladislaus II, was born on 1 March 1456—two years after the wedding. She gave birth to seven children in ten years. The children received extensive education, which was credited to Elisabeth by Marcin Kromer. Their tutors included Polish priest Jan Długosz and Italian humanist Filippo Buonaccorsi.

Queen Elisabeth had an influence on her husband Casimir, but she did not play a more active role in politics. Instead, Elisabeth was very actively involved in arranging her daughters' marriages. Her influence was particularly evident during the negotiations for the marriage of her daughter Hedwig to George, Duke of Bavaria in December 1474. When Elisabeth's demands exceeded the authority of Bavarian envoys, instead of sending the envoys back to discuss the demands with the Duke of Bavaria, Elisabeth took the responsibility for her demands and wrote a letter to the Duke asking him not to punish the envoys. Elisabeth did not arrange her sons' marriages and none of her sons under her influence married young: Casimir (died at age 26) and John Albert (died at age 41) never married, while Sigismund married at 47. Only Alexander, who lived in Lithuania, and Vladislaus, who lived in Bohemia, married while Elisabeth was alive.

=== Struggle for Hungary and Bohemia ===
After the 1457 death of Elisabeth's childless brother, King Ladislaus the Posthumous, she and her family started to advance their claims to the thrones of Bohemia and Hungary. The Poles argued that since Elisabeth's dowry was unpaid, she was entitled to the Hungarian and Bohemian lands. However, the Golden Bull of 1356 did not recognize women's inheritance rights and Hungarian and Bohemian nobles considered their monarchy to be elective, not hereditary. Therefore, they elected Matthias Corvinus and George of Poděbrady. Since Poland was engaged in the Thirteen Years' War (1454–66), King Casimir could not enforce Elisabeth's claims. However, that did not stop political measures. In 1466, Bishop Rudolf of Rüdesheim informed Elisabeth that Pope Paul II considered George of Poděbrady to be a heretic and Elisabeth a rightful heir to the throne of Bohemia. When Matthias Corvinus proposed to Elisabeth's daughter Hedwig in 1468, Elisabeth angrily refused and called Corvinus a 'dog'.

A new chapter in Elisabeth's struggle for her inheritance began with the death of Poděbrady in 1471, Elisabeth's son Vladislaus II became King of Bohemia. At the same time a group of Catholic Bohemian nobles supported Corvinus instead of Vladislaus II. In turn, a group of Hungarian nobles conspired against Corvinus and invited the Polish king to overthrow him. With Bohemia in Vladislaus' hands, King Casimir IV decided to install his son, future Saint Casimir, in Hungary. A Polish army invaded Hungary, but the army was ill-supplied and the short Hungarian campaign was not successful. The war in Bohemia continued until the Peace of Olomouc divided Bohemia between Corvinus and Vladislaus II.

After the death of Corvinus in April 1490, Casimir and Elisabeth supported their son John I Albert as King of Hungary. Hungarian nobles preferred ineffectual Vladislaus II. After Elisabeth's pleas on behalf of John Albert, who reportedly was her favorite, failed to persuade Vladislaus II to abandon the Hungarian crown, a war erupted between the two brothers in June 1490 and lasted until January 1492. John Albert lost and returned to Poland, while Vladislaus II was crowned as King of Hungary. At last, Elisabeth's son ruled both Hungary and Bohemia, except that it was not the son she desired. Hungary and Bohemia were ruled by Vladislaus and his son Louis II of Hungary until 1526.

== Queen mother ==
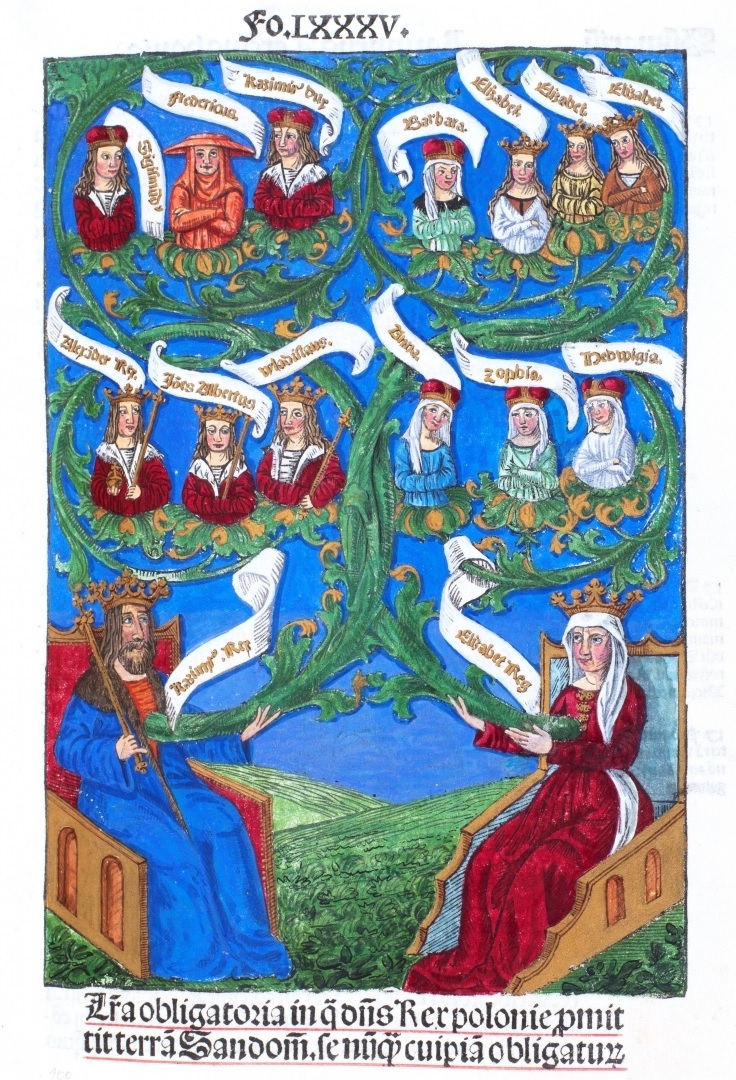
King Casimir IV Jagiellon (left) and Queen Elizabeth (right) with their children, 1506

King Casimir died on 7 June 1492. Art historians believe that she hired artist Veit Stoss to create Casimir's tomb and recumbent effigy. The Lithuanian throne was already secured by Alexander Jagiellon who acted as his father's regent in Lithuania since 1490. Elisabeth took decisive actions to secure the Polish throne to her favorite son John I Albert—she wrote letters to Teutonic Grand Master Johann von Tiefen, her sons Vladislaus II and Alexander campaigning on behalf of John Albert. More importantly, she borrowed 5,675 florins from the Fischel banking family and hired a group of Hungarian soldiers. These soldiers, led by Elisabeth's son Fryderyk, marched to Piotrków Trybunalski where Polish nobles elected John Albert as their King on 27 August. The personal union between Poland and Lithuania was temporarily interrupted.

Widowed, Elisabeth led a sedentary life in Kraków in the company of her youngest daughters Barbara and Elisabeth. She was not involved in state politics. Her only known political move during the reign of John Albert was asking the King to support Frederick of Saxony in his quest for the title of Grand Master of the Teutonic Knights. However, she continued to take an active role in family matters. In early 1495, she traveled to Vilnius to attend the wedding of her son Alexander and Helena of Moscow. Elisabeth wanted to convince Helena to convert from Eastern Orthodoxy to Catholicism and to obtain a position for her son Sigismund. She failed in both regards and left Lithuania angered and insulted—perhaps because of this dislike she was passive when John Albert suddenly died in 1501 and did not take any more prominent actions to support Alexander as a candidate to the Polish throne.

In 1496, she arranged the marriage of Barbara to George, Duke of Saxony. Elisabeth was left with only her youngest daughter, also named Elisabeth, as her companion in Kraków. Perhaps with his mother's help Sigismund obtained the Duchy of Głogów from his brother Vladislaus II in 1499. In 1503, she funded a chapel within Wawel Cathedral to house the tomb of her son John Albert by Florentine artist Francesco Fiorentino. She also sent a Polish governess to Vladislaus II when he was expecting his first child Anne. Elisabeth opposed the marriage of her youngest daughter Elisabeth to Bogdan III, Voivode of Moldavia. Instead, in 1504 and 1505 Queen Elisabeth assigned her lands and income to ensure her daughter's financial independence; Princess Elisabeth also inherited the bulk of the queen's wealth.

Elisabeth became ill in 1505, but her symptoms are unknown. She died on 30 August 1505. She was interred next to her husband and two daughters in her husband's tomb on 21 September in Wawel Cathedral.

== Issue ==
Casimir and Elisabeth had the following children:

1. Vladislaus II (1 March 1456 – 13 March 1516), King of Bohemia and Hungary
2. Hedwig (21 September 1457 – 18 February 1502), married on 14 November 1475 to George, Duke of Bavaria-Landshut
3. Casimir (3 October 1458 – 4 March 1484), patron saint of Lithuania
4. John I Albert (27 December 1459 – 17 June 1501), King of Poland and Duke of Głogów
5. Alexander (5 August 1461 – 19 August 1506), Grand Duke of Lithuania and King of Poland
6. Sophia (6 May 1464 – 5 October 1512), married on 14 February 1479 to Frederick I, Margrave of Brandenburg-Ansbach.
7. Elizabeth (9 May 1465 – 9 May 1466)
8. Sigismund I (1 January 1467 – 1 April 1548), King of Poland and Grand Duke of Lithuania
9. Frederick (27 April 1468 – 14 March 1503), Archbishop of Gniezno and Primate of Poland
10. Elizabeth (13 May 1472 – betw. 19 May 1480/20 May 1481)
11. Anna (12 March 1476 – 12 August 1503), married on 2 February 1491 to Bogislaw X, Duke of Pomerania
12. Barbara (15 July 1478 – 15 February 1534), married on 21 November 1496 to George, Duke of Saxony
13. Elizabeth (13 November 1482 – 16 February 1517), married on 25 November 1515 to Frederick II, Duke of Legnica

== Ancestors ==
Ancestors of Elizabeth of Austria (1436–1505)

8. Albert III, Duke of Austria
4. Albert IV, Duke of Austria
9. Beatrice of Nuremberg
2. Albert II of Germany
10. Albert I, Duke of Bavaria
5. Joanna Sophia of Bavaria
11. Margaret of Brieg
1. Elisabeth of Habsburg
12. Charles IV, Holy Roman Emperor
6. Sigismund, Holy Roman Emperor
13. Elizabeth of Pomerania
3. Elisabeth of Luxembourg
14. Hermann II, Count of Cilli
7. Barbara of Cilli
15. Anna of Schaunberg

== Notes and references ==
Notes

References

- Brzezińska, Anna (1999). "Female Control of Dynastic Politics". In Balázs Nagy; János M. Bak; Marcell Sebők (eds.). The Man of Many Devices, who Wandered Full Many Ways. Central European University Press. ISBN 963911667X.
- Duczmal, Małgorzata (2012). Jogailaičiai (in Lithuanian). translated by Birutė Mikalonienė and Vyturys Jarutis. Vilnius: Mokslo ir enciklopedijų leidybos centras. ISBN 978-5-420-01703-6.
- Putnam, Ruth (1918). Luxemburg and Her Neighbours: A Record of the Political Fortunes of the Present Grand Duchy from the Eve of the French Revolution to the Great War, with a Preliminary Sketch of Events from 963 to 1780. G. P. Putnam's Sons. p. 53.

Elizabeth of Austria (1436–1505) House of Habsburg Born: 1436 Died: 30 August 1505
Royal titles
Preceded by Sophia of Halshany	Queen consort of Poland; 1454–1492	Succeeded by Helena of Moscow
Preceded by Anne of Tver	Grand Duchess consort of Lithuania; 1454–1492	Succeeded by Helena of Moscow
