= Ruprecht of the Palatinate (bishop of Freising) =

Bishop of Freising from 1495 to 1498

His Excellency Ruprecht of the Palatinate
- Bishop of Freising
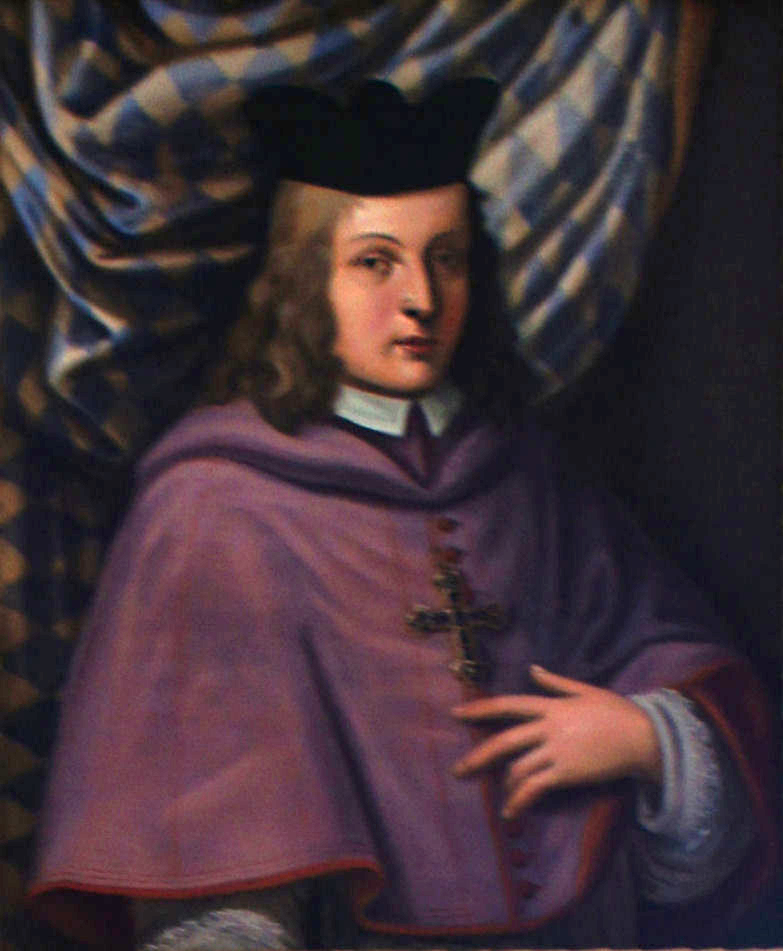
- Ruprecht of the Palatinate
- Church: Roman Catholic
- Diocese: Freising
- In office: 1 August 1495 - 3 December 1498
- Predecessor: Sixtus of Tannberg
- Successor: Philip of the Palatinate

Orders
- Rank: Bishop

Personal details
- Born: 14 May 1481 Heidelberg, Electoral Palatinate
- Died: 20 August 1504 (aged 23) Landshut, Bavaria-Landshut
- Parents: Philip, Elector Palatine; Margaret of Bavaria
- Spouse: Elisabeth of Bavaria (m. 1499)
- Children: Otto Henry, Elector Palatine; Philip, Duke of Palatinate-Neuburg

Ruprecht of the Palatinate, count Palatine of the Rhine (Pfalzgraf bei Rhein), (14 May 1481, in Heidelberg – 20 August 1504, in Landshut) was the third son of Philip, Elector Palatine of the House of Wittelsbach and he was Bishop of Freising from 1495 to 1498.

== Life ==
Ruprecht ruled as bishop of the Freising Hochstift from 1495 to 1498, without ever having been consecrated as a priest. He married his first cousin, Elisabeth of Bavaria (1478–1504) in 1499, daughter of George, Duke of Bavaria. Ruprecht was adopted by his father-in-law and declared the heir of Bavaria-Landshut which led to the outbreak of the Landshut War of Succession after the death of Duke George in 1503. After Elizabeth and Ruprecht were placed under the imperial ban by Emperor Maximilian on 23 April 1504, they died in quick succession later in 1504 of dysentery. The war ended on 30 July 1505 with the arbitration of Emperor Maximilian I at the Cologne Reichstag. The Duchy of Palatinate-Neuburg was created as a compensation for their surviving children Otto Henry and Philip.

== Family and children ==
On 10 February 1499, Ruprecht married Elizabeth of Bavaria, daughter of George of Bavaria. They had the following four children:

1. Twin sons Georg and Ruprecht (November 1500 – August 1504)
2. Otto Henry (10 April 1502 – 12 February 1559), Count of Palatinate-Neuburg (1505–1559) and Elector Palatine (1556–1559)
3. Philip (12 November 1503 – 4 July 1548), Count of Palatinate-Neuburg (1505–1541)

== Ancestors ==
Ancestors of Ruprecht of the Palatinate (bishop of Freising)

16. Rupert of Germany
8. Louis III, Elector Palatine
17. Elisabeth of Nuremberg
4. Louis IV, Elector Palatine
18. Amadeo, Prince of Achaea
9. Matilda of Savoy
19. Catherine of Geneva
2. Philip, Elector Palatine
20. Amadeus VII, Count of Savoy
10. Amadeus VIII of Savoy
21. Bonne of Berry
5. Margaret of Savoy
22. Philip the Bold
11. Mary of Burgundy
23. Margaret III, Countess of Flanders
1. Ruprecht of the Palatinate
24. Frederick, Duke of Bavaria
12. Henry XVI, Duke of Bavaria
25. Maddalena Visconti
6. Louis IX, Duke of Bavaria
26. Albert IV, Duke of Austria
13. Margaret of Austria
27. Joanna Sophia of Bavaria
3. Margaret of Bavaria
28. Frederick I, Elector of Saxony
14. Frederick II, Elector of Saxony
29. Catherine of Brunswick-Lüneburg
7. Amalia of Saxony
30. Ernest, Duke of Austria
15. Margaret of Austria
31. Cymburgis of Masovia

== Notes and references ==
- Sigmund Ritter von Riezler (1889). "Ruprecht, Pfalzgraf bei Rhein" . Allgemeine Deutsche Biographie (in German). Vol. 29. Leipzig: Duncker & Humblot. pp. 726–728.

Ruprecht of the Palatinate (bishop of Freising) House of Wittelsbach Born: 1481 Died: 1504
Preceded by Sixtus of Tannberg	Bishop of Freising; 1495 – 1498	Succeeded by Philip of the Palatinate
