= Frederick Jagiellon =

Polish prince and archbishop

His Eminence Frederick Jagiellon
- Cardinal; Archbishop of Gniezno; Primate of Poland
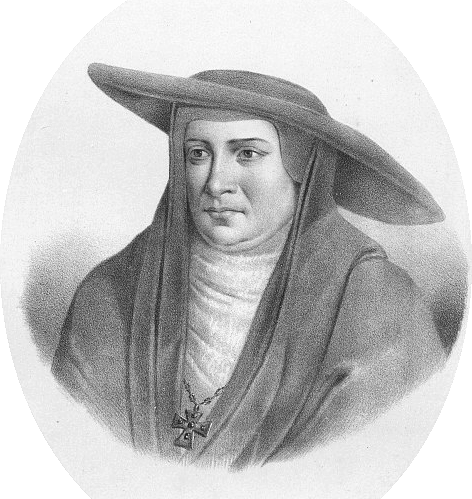
- A 19th-century likeness of Frederick inspired by his original epitaph at Wawel Cathedral
- Archdiocese: Gniezno
- Metropolis: Gniezno, Poland
- Installed: 1493
- Term ended: 1503

Orders
- Created cardinal: 20 September 1493
- Rank: Cardinal-Priest

Personal details
- Born: April 27, 1468 Kraków, Kingdom of Poland
- Died: March 14, 1503 (aged 34) Kraków, Kingdom of Poland
- Denomination: Roman Catholic
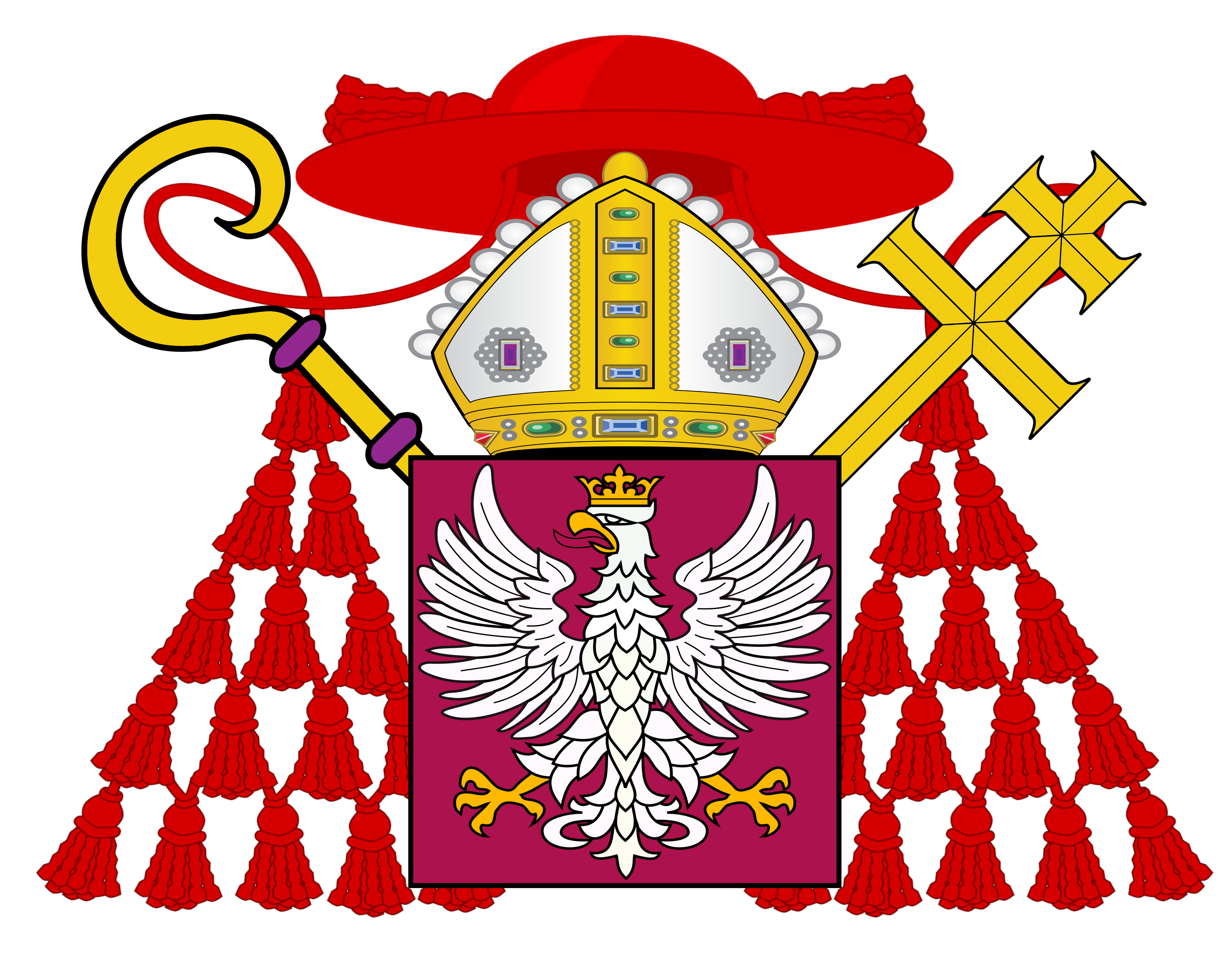
- Coat of arms

Frederick Jagiellon (Polish: Fryderyk Jagiellończyk; Lithuanian: Fridrikas Jogailaitis; 27 April 1468 – 14 March 1503) was a prince of the Kingdom of Poland and of the Grand Duchy of Lithuania, Archbishop of Gniezno, Bishop of Kraków, and Primate of Poland. He was the sixth son and ninth child of Casimir IV Jagiellon, King of Poland and Grand Duke of Lithuania, and his wife Elizabeth of Austria, known as 'Matka Jagiellonów' (Mother of the Jagiellons).

Frederick ruled two dioceses with devotion. He cared about the cult of saints, the appropriate education of the clergy, took care of the liturgical life, carried out the diocesan and provincial synods. He also cared about the liturgy, foundations, and restoring of churches, including the restoration of the Kraków and Gniezno Cathedrals.

== Life ==
Frederick was born in Kraków, and was named after the Holy Roman Emperor Frederick III. His godfather was Protazy, Bishop of Olomouc. After the death of Bishop Jan Rzeszów, he was elected Archbishop of Kraków on 13 April 1488. His father sought to secure him the Bishopric of Warmia in Prussia, but the Frauenburg (now Frombork) cathedral chapter of the Diocese of Warmia elected Lucas Watzenrode in 1489.

He worked for the Polish throne in 1492 together with his brother, John I Albert, and in 1501 he contributed to the nomination of another of his brothers, King Alexander, who strengthened the Polish–Lithuanian union. After the death of Zbigniew Oleśnicki on 2 October 1493, he was appointed Archbishop of Gniezno (and Polish Primate at the same time). From that moment on he held the two traditionally most important bishoprics in Poland. His position in the Polish Church strengthened after his promotion to cardinal by Pope Alexander VI on 20 September 1493, having received the title of Sanctae Lucia in Septomsoliis in December that year. After being appointed Archbishop of Gniezno, Frederick received episcopal consecration.

He died in the Bishop's Palace in Kraków after a long illness, in March 1503.

== Bibliography ==
- Hubert Kaczmarski, Votes of Polish Primates, Warsaw 1988.
- Piotr Nitecki, The Bishops of the Church in Poland in the year 965, Warsaw 2000. ISBN 83-211-1311-7.
