= George, Duke of Bavaria =

Duke of Bavaria-Landshut from 1479 to 1503

George the Rich
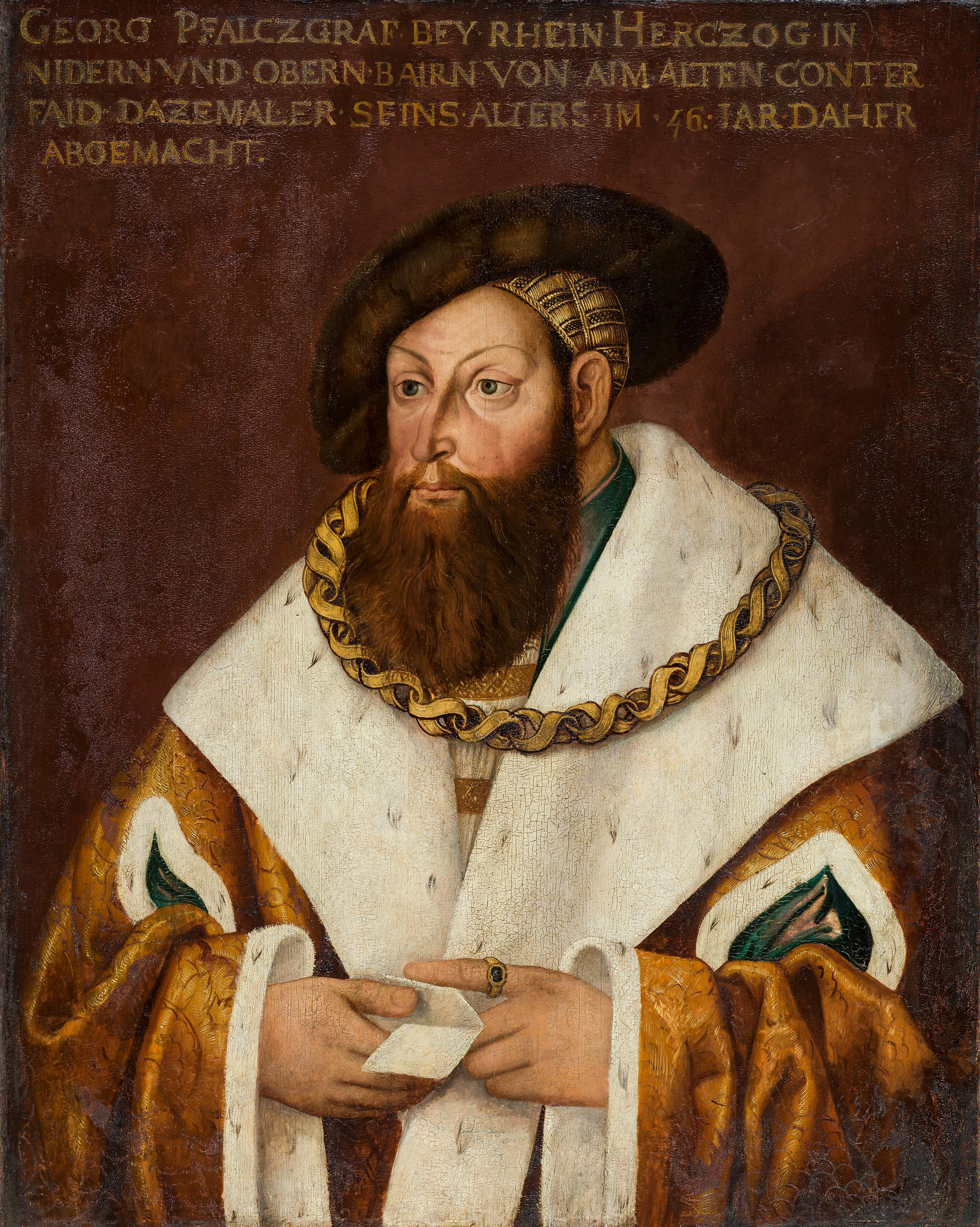
- Portrait by Peter Gertner

Duke of Bavaria-Landshut
- Reign: 18 January 1479 – 1 December 1503
- Predecessor: Louis IX
- Successor: Albert IV (merged with Bavaria-Munich)
- Born: 15 August 1455; Burghausen, Bavaria-Landshut
- Died: 1 December 1503 (aged 48); Ingolstadt, Bavaria-Landshut
- Spouse: Hedwig Jagiellon (m. 1475; died 1502)
- Issue among others...: Elisabeth of Bavaria
- House: Wittelsbach
- Father: Louis IX, Duke of Bavaria
- Mother: Amalia of Saxony

George of Bavaria referred to as the Rich (15 August 1455 in Burghausen, Bavaria – 1 December 1503 in Ingolstadt), (German: Georg, Herzog von Bayern-Landshut) was the last duke of Bavaria-Landshut. He was a son of Louis IX the Rich and Amalia of Saxony.

== Biography ==
Together with his cousin Albert IV of Bavaria-Munich George tried to extend his influence in Further Austria, but in 1489 he abandoned these plans to settle the difference with Frederick III, Holy Roman Emperor. George later became a strong ally of Emperor Maximilian I and supported his campaigns in Swabia, Switzerland, Geldern and Hungary.

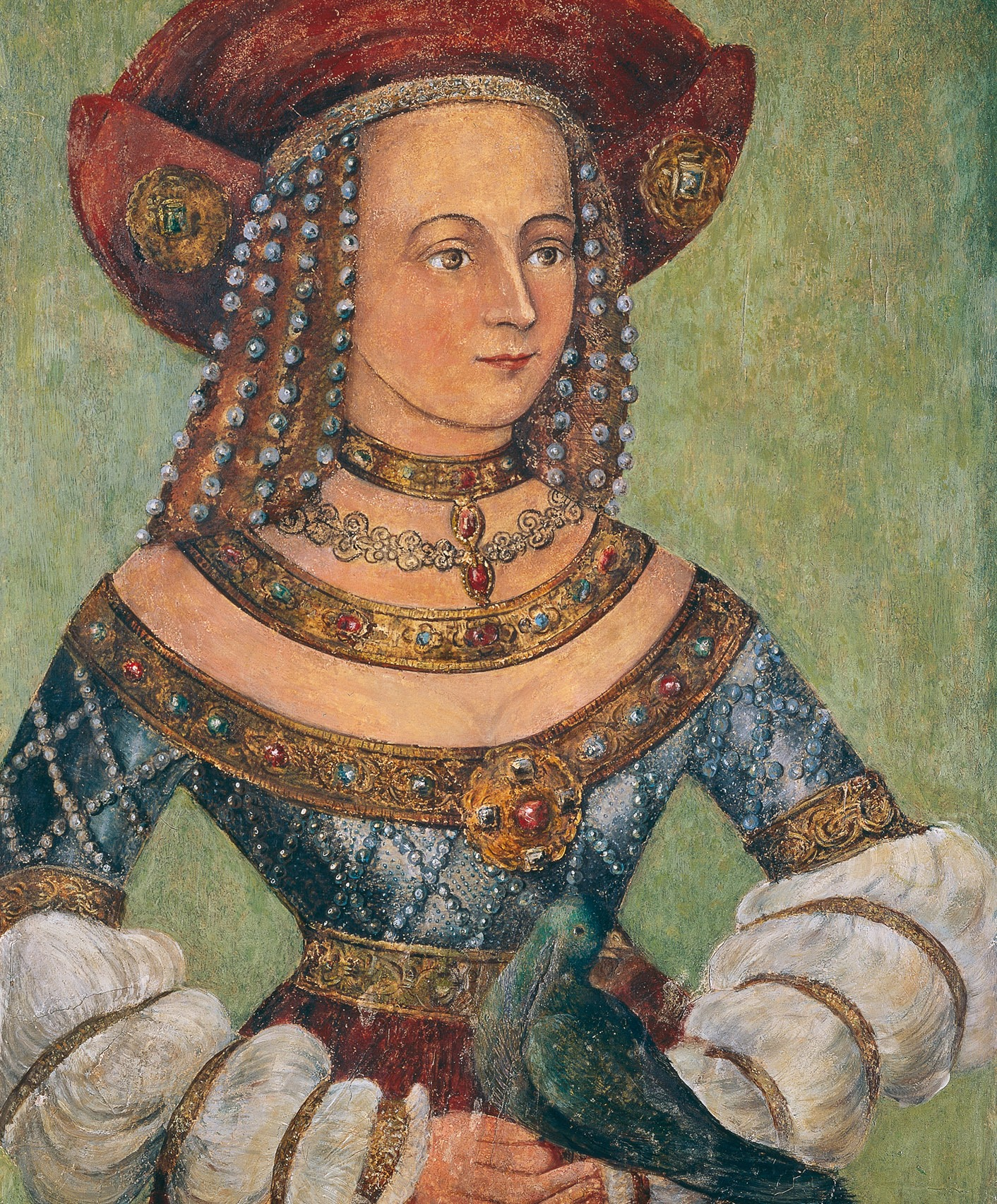
Hedwig Jagiellon

His wedding with the princess Hedwig Jagiellon, a daughter of King Casimir IV of Poland, in 1475 was celebrated in the Landshut Wedding with one of the most splendid festivals of the Middle Ages. The couple had five children, three sons and two daughters. However, none of their sons survived until George's death, and per the restrictions of the Salic law practiced in medieval Germany, their daughters could not inherit the duchy. However, George tried to bequeath the duchy to his daughter Elizabeth and her husband Ruprecht of the Palatinate, third son of Philip, Elector Palatine. This led to a destructive war of succession after George's death in 1503–1504. Finally he was succeeded by Albert IV of Bavaria-Munich. Only the new duchy of Palatinate-Neuburg passed to Ruprecht's sons Otto-Henry, Elector Palatine (Ottheinrich) and Philip. The most southern districts of Bavaria-Landshut Kufstein, Kitzbühel and Rattenberg passed to Emperor Maximilian and were united with Tyrol.

== Issue ==
George and Hedwig had the following children:

1. Ludwig of Bavaria (1476–1496)
2. Rupert of Bavaria (1477)
3. Elisabeth of Bavaria (1478–1504), married Ruprecht of the Palatinate and was mother of Otto Henry, Elector Palatine.
4. Margaret of Bavaria (1480–1531)
5. Wolfgang of Bavaria (*/† 1482)

== Ancestors ==
Ancestors of George, Duke of Bavaria

16. Stephen II, Duke of Bavaria
8. Frederick, Duke of Bavaria
17. Elisabeth of Sicily, Duchess of Bavaria
4. Henry XVI, Duke of Bavaria
18. Bernabò Visconti
9. Maddalena Visconti
19. Beatrice Regina della Scala
2. Louis IX, Duke of Bavaria
20. Albert III, Duke of Austria
10. Albert IV, Duke of Austria
21. Beatrix of Nuremberg
5. Margarete of Austria
22. Albert I, Duke of Bavaria
11. Joanna Sophia of Bavaria
23. Margaret of Brieg
1. George, Duke of Bavaria
24. Frederick III, Landgrave of Thuringia
12. Frederick I, Elector of Saxony
25. Catherine of Henneberg
6. Frederick II, Elector of Saxony
26. Henry the Mild, Duke of Brunswick-Lüneburg
13. Catherine of Brunswick-Lüneburg
27. Sophie of Pomerania
3. Amalia of Saxony
28. Leopold III, Duke of Austria
14. Ernest, Duke of Austria
29. Viridis Visconti
7. Margaret of Austria, Electress of Saxony
30. Siemowit IV, Duke of Masovia
15. Cymburgis of Masovia
31. Alexandra of Lithuania

George, Duke of Bavaria House of Wittelsbach Born: 15 August 1455 Died: 1 December 1503
Regnal titles
Preceded by Louis IX	Duke of Bavaria-Landshut; 1479–1503	Succeeded by Albert IV
