= 1442 =

1442 in various calendars
- Gregorian calendar: 1442; MCDXLII
- Ab urbe condita: 2195
- Armenian calendar: 891; ԹՎ ՊՂԱ
- Assyrian calendar: 6192
- Balinese saka calendar: 1363–1364
- Bengali calendar: 848–849
- Berber calendar: 2392
- English Regnal year: 20 Hen. 6 – 21 Hen. 6
- Buddhist calendar: 1986
- Burmese calendar: 804
- Byzantine calendar: 6950–6951
- Chinese calendar: 辛酉年 (Metal Rooster); 4139 or 3932 — to — 壬戌年 (Water Dog); 4140 or 3933
- Coptic calendar: 1158–1159
- Discordian calendar: 2608
- Ethiopian calendar: 1434–1435
- Hebrew calendar: 5202–5203
- Hindu calendars
- Vikram Samvat: 1498–1499
- Shaka Samvat: 1363–1364
- Kali Yuga: 4542–4543
- Holocene calendar: 11442
- Igbo calendar: 442–443
- Iranian calendar: 820–821
- Islamic calendar: 845–846
- Japanese calendar: Kakitsu 2 (嘉吉２年)
- Javanese calendar: 1357–1358
- Julian calendar: 1442; MCDXLII
- Korean calendar: 3775
- Minguo calendar: 470 before ROC 民前470年
- Nanakshahi calendar: −26
- Thai solar calendar: 1984–1985
- Tibetan calendar: ལྕགས་མོ་བྱ་ལོ་ (female Iron-Bird); 1568 or 1187 or 415 — to — ཆུ་ཕོ་ཁྱི་ལོ་ (male Water-Dog); 1569 or 1188 or 416

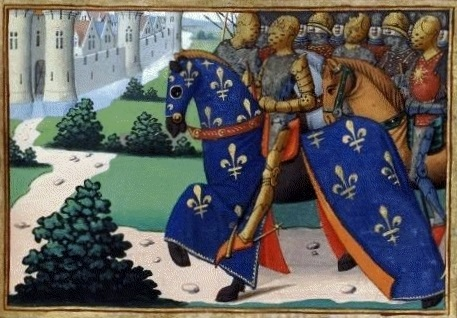
June 24: French troops come to the rescue of Tartas

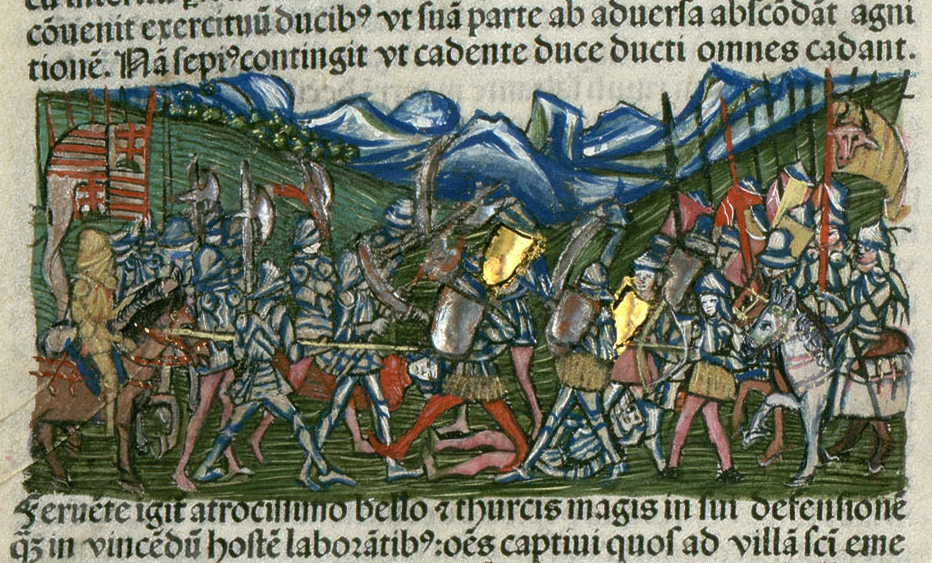
March 25: John Hunyadi of Hungary defeats Ottomans at the 'Battle of Hermannstadt (image from the Chronica Hungagorum

Year 1442 (MCDXLII) was a common year starting on Monday of the Julian calendar.

== Events ==
=== January–March ===
- January 25 –
  - The English Parliament opens at Westminster for a 60-day session, and the House of Commons re-elects William Tresham as its speaker.
  - The Treaty of Nürtingen is signed between the two counts of Württemberg, the brothers Ludwig and Ulrich, dividing the German territory between them.
  - John Fortescue becomes the new Lord Chief Justice of England and Wales, replacing the late John Hody.
- January 25 – Two months after the death of the Burmese King Minye Kyawswa I of Ava, his brother-in-law Thihapate of Mohnyin turns down an offer to rule the kingdom, and recommends that Kyswswa's younger brother, Thihathu, Viceroy of Prome, become the new King.
- February 4 – As part of his campaign to reunite the Christian churches of the world, Pope Eugene IV promulgates the Bull of Union with the Copts (officially, Cantate Domino), an attempted union with the Coptic Orthodox Church of Egypt.
- March 25 – Battle of Hermannstadt: After seven days of fighting that began on March 18, John Hunyadi defeats an army of the Ottoman Empire (80,000 strong), led by Mezid Bey of Vidin, near Sibiu in what is now Romania.
- March 27 – The English Parliament adjourns and King Henry VI gives royal assent to numerous adts passed, including the Treason Act 1442 (making the act of restraining English citizens or possessions within Wales an act punishable as treason) and the Peeresses Act 1441 (requiring that wives of nobles shall be put on trial in the same way as the peers of the realm)

=== April–June ===
- April 6 – Thihathu is enthroned as the new Burmese King Narapati I of Ava.Royal Historical Commission of Burma (2003) [1832]. Hmannan Yazawin (in Burmese). Vol. 2. Yangon: Ministry of Information, Myanmar. p. 81.
- May 8 – In Germany, the Electorate of Brandenburg and the Duchy of Pomerania enter into an alliance against the Duchy of Mecklenburg-Stargard.
- June 2 – After a six-month siege, King Alfonso of Aragon proclaims himself King of Naples. Alfonso allows the French ruler, King René of Anjou, to return to France.
- June 4 – Erik III is deposed as King of Norway and the nobles vote to invite King Christopher of Sweden to become the new monarch.
- June 8 – In China, Qian marries the 14-year-old Emperor Yingzong of Ming and becomes the primary Empress Consort.
- June 17 – Friedrich, Duke of Inner Austria is crowned as Romanorum Rex, King of the Germans, and becomes the heir to the Holy Roman Emperor.
- June 24 – The Siege of Tartas ends in France after almost two years, when French forces come to the relief of Charles II of Albret and force the Gascony rebels and English troops to retreat.

=== July–September ===
- July 2 – The coronation of King Christopher of Sweden and Denmark as King of Norway takes place in Oslo.
- August 29 – Fransez I becomes the new Duke of Brittany upon the death of his father, Yann V. Princess Isabella of Scotland, who had been part of a contract to marry Jean V, arranges to marry Francis I
- August 30 – Louis IV, Elector Palatine, agrees to serve as the judge in resolving a dispute between Henry II, Count of Nassau-Siegen and the Archbishop Jakob von Sierck.
- September 2 – John Hunyadi defeats another army of the Ottoman Empire (70,000 strong), led by Hadım Şehabeddin, Beylerbey (or governor) of Rumelia, near the Ialomița River. Following this, he places Basarab II as ruler of Wallachia.
- September 15 – Lê Nhân Tông becomes the new Emperor of Vietnam upon the death of his father, Lê Thái Tông.

=== October–December ===
- October 18 – The University of Ferrara is reopened in Italy, after having been closed for 48 years.
- November 18 – A few days before his 15th birthday, Emperor Yingzong of Ming assumes full control of the Empire of China, two days before the death of his grandmother and regent Empress Dowager Chengxiaozhao.
- December 13 – King Władysław III of Poland, who had been elected as King of Hungary in 1440, and Elisabeth of Luxembourg, widow of King Albert of Hungary and mother of Ladislaus the Posthumous, whom she arranged to be crowned king, reach an agreement in the Hungaryian city of Győr, brokered by Cardinal Julian Cesarini. Elizabeth dies at the age of 33, six days after the meeting, leading to rumors that she had been poisoned by King Wladyslaw.
- December 18 – In Italy Tomaso di Campofregoso, Doge of the Republic of Genoa, is removed from office by a group of armed men, led by Raffaele Adorno and Giovanni Antonio Fieschi, who invade the Ducal Palace and force him to leave.
- December 19 – Pope Eugene IV issues the papal bull Illius qui se pro divini granting full remission of sins to any Christian who had participated in the Crusades by Prince Henry the Navigator against the Saracens.

=== Date unknown ===
- The community of Rauma, Finland is granted its town rights.
- The municipality of Juva, Finland is founded.
- The national law of Kristofers landslag is introduced in Sweden.
- After being imprisoned (before September) by the Sultan, Vlad II Dracul is temporarily replaced, as ruler of Wallachia, by his son Mircea II.
- A fourth tower is added to Liverpool Castle in England.
- Jelena Balšić completes writing the Gorički zbornik manuscripts at her church of St. Mary, on the island of Beška in the Serbian Despotate.
- Portuguese sailors first arrive at the Senegal River.

== Births ==
- April 13 – Henry IV of Neuhaus, High Treasurer of Bohemia (1485–1503), Burgrave of Prague Castle (1503–1507) (d. 1507)
- April 15 – John Paston, English noble (d. 1479)
- April 28 – Edward IV, King of England from 4 March 1461 until 3 October 1470, and again from 11 April 1471 to 9 April 1483 (d. 1483)
- July 3 – Emperor Go-Tsuchimikado of Japan (d. 1500)
- July 15 – Boček IV of Poděbrady, Bohemian nobleman, eldest son of King George of Podebrady (d. 1496)
- September 8 – John de Vere, 13th Earl of Oxford (d. 1513)
- September 27 – John de la Pole, 2nd Duke of Suffolk (d. 1492)
- date unknown
  - Ahmad Zarruq, Moroccan scholar and Sufi sheikh (d. 1493)
  - Tamás Bakócz, Hungarian archbishop (d. 1521)
  - Vannozza dei Cattanei, mistress of Pope Alexander VI

== Deaths ==
- August 29 – Duke John V of Brittany (b. 1389)
- September 25 – Robert de Morley, 6th Baron Morley, Lord of Morley Saint Botolph (b. 1418)
- October 18 – Infante João of Portugal (b. 1400)
- November 14 – Yolande of Aragon, politically active French noblewoman (b. 1384)
- December 18 – Pierre Cauchon, French Catholic bishop (b. 1371)
- December 19 – Elizabeth of Luxembourg (b. 1409)
- date unknown
  - Al-Maqrizi, Egyptian Arab historian
  - Ahmed Shah, Sultan of Gujarat
  - Nguyễn Trãi, Vietnamese Confucian scholar.
