= Heinrich, Count of Württemberg =

Count of Württemberg-Montbéliard

Henry of Württemberg
- Count of Montbéliard
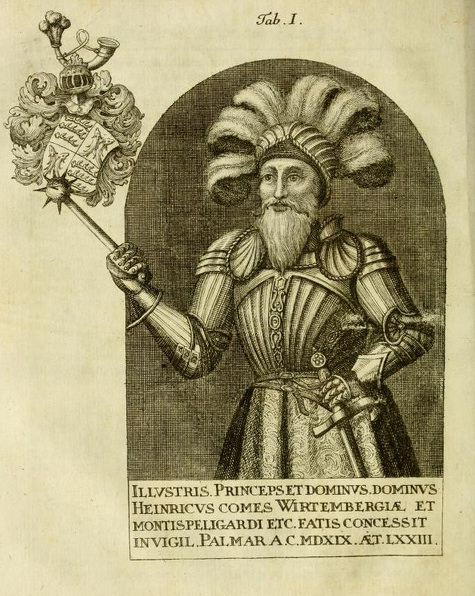
- Henry of Württemberg (later representation, probably not authentic)
- Born: 7 September 1448; Stuttgart
- Died: 15 April 1519 (aged 70); Hohenurach Castle, near Bad Urach
- Spouse: Elisabeth of Zweibrücken-Bitsch (m. 1485; died 1487) Eva of Salm (m. 1488)
- Issue: Ulrich, Duke of Württemberg; Maria, Duchess of Brunswick-Lüneburg; George I of Württemberg-Mömpelgard
- Father: Ulrich V, Count of Württemberg
- Mother: Elisabeth of Bavaria-Landshut, Countess of Württemberg

Henry of Württemberg (7 September 1448 – 15 April 1519) was, from 1473 to 1482, count of Montbéliard.

== Life ==
Henry was the second son of Count Ulrich V of Württemberg-Stuttgart from his second marriage to Elisabeth of Bavaria-Landshut. As a second son, Henry was provided with a career in the clergy. In 1464, he became provost at Eichstätt. The intent was that he would succeed Adolph II of Nassau as Archbishop of Mainz.

To that end, he was appointed as Adolph's coadjutor and worldly regent in 1465. This plan had been masterminded by the powerful Elector Albrecht III Achilles of Brandenburg, who married his daughter Elisabeth to Henry's brother Eberhard II. This would bind the Archbishopric of Mainz tightly to the Margraviate of Brandenburg and to the imperial party, which was led by Albrecht Achilles, and to which Henry's father Ulrich V also belonged.

The archbishop of Mainz was one of the seven electors and thus had considerable influence on policy in the Holy Roman Empire of German Nation. The plan was directed against the Wittelsbach family, and in particular Elector Palatine Frederick I, who had humiliated Ulrich V in the Battle of Seckenheim in 1462. The Archbishop of Mainz, however, disagreed with the plan and refused to play the intended rôle.

This led to the so-called "coadjutor feud" from 1465 to 1467. In 1466, Count John of Wertheim declared a feud against Henry. This feud escalated to a conflict between the great princes of the Empire and almost to a civil war. In the end, the Elector Palatine won the conflict on a diplomatic level and Henry and the other Württembergs stood empty-handed. Henry was compensated with the district of Bischofsheim, which he returned to the Electorate of Mainz in 1470.

The 1473 Treaty of Urach awarded the county of Montbéliard and the other Württemberg possessions on the left bank of the Rhine to Henry. In the course of a dispute between Duke Charles the Bold of Burgundy and Emperor Frederick III, Charles took Henry prisoner in 1474. The captivity lasted until 1477 and Henry was treated very badly, allegedly including a mock execution. After his father's death in 1480, Henry claimed a part of the inheritance, in particular Württemberg-Stuttgart. He did not succeed, and in the 1482 Treaty of Reichenweier, he gave the county of Montbéliard to his brother, Eberhard II.

In 1490, his cousin Eberhard I had Henry arrested in Stuttgart, on the grounds of an alleged mental illness. In 1492, Emperor Frederick III appointed Eberhard I as Henry's legal guardian. Until his death in 1519, Henry and his wife, Eva, were held prisoner on Hohenurach Castle, although they were occasionally allowed to visit Stuttgart.

== Importance ==
In 1999, the historian Klaus Graf tried to rehabilitate Henry, who had been stigmatized as a madman by the historiography of Württemberg.

He referred to Henry's intellectual interests, which we can infer from his collections of prints and manuscripts. In 2004, Felix Heinzer tried to compare Henry and Eberhard I as book lovers, based on a recently discovered book from Henry's collection.

== Marriage and issue ==
Henry married Countess Elisabeth of Zweibrücken-Bitsch in 1485. Elizabeth died on 17 February 1487, a few days after giving birth to her son, Eitel Henry, on 8 February 1487. At his confirmation in 1493, Eitel Henry's name was changed to Ulrich and he later became the third Duke of Württemberg.

Henry married Countess Eva of Salm on 21 July 1488; they had two children:

- Maria (1496–1541), married Duke Henry V of Brunswick-Lüneburg
- George I of Württemberg-Mömpelgard (1498–1558)

Henry was thus the founder of the older line of Württemberg-Mömpelgard.

== Ancestors ==
Ancestors of Heinrich, Count of Württemberg

8. Eberhard III, Count of Württemberg
4. Eberhard IV, Count of Württemberg
9. Antonia Visconti
2. Ulrich V, Count of Württemberg
10. Henry of Orbe
5. Henriette, Countess of Montbéliard
11. Marie de Chatillon, Vicountess of Blaigny
1. Henry, Count of Württemberg
12. Frederick, Duke of Bavaria
6. Henry XVI, Duke of Bavaria
13. Maddalena Visconti
3. Elisabeth of Bavaria-Landshut
14. Albert IV, Duke of Austria
7. Margaret of Austria
15. Joanna Sophia of Bavaria

== Footnotes ==
Heinrich, Count of Württemberg House of Württemberg Born: 7 September 1448 Died: 15 April 1519
Preceded by Eberhard I	Count of Montbéliard; 1473-1482	Succeeded by Eberhard I
