= List of electresses of the Palatinate =

The Electress of the Palatinate (German: Kurfürstin von der Pfalz) was the consort of the Prince-elector of the Electorate of the Palatinate, one of the Holy Roman Empire's greatest princes.

== First Electorate, 1356–1648 ==
=== House of Wittelsbach, Main branch, 1356–1559 ===
Picture	Name	Father	Birth	Marriage	Became Electress	Ceased to be Electress	Death	Husband
	Elisabeth of Namur	John I, Marquis of Namur (Dampierre)	1329	Autumn 1350 or Summer 1358	10 January 1356; Raised to Electress	29 March 1382		Rupert I
	Beatrice of Berg	William VII of Jülich, 1st Duke of Berg (Jülich)	1360	before 14 November 1385		16 February 1390 husband's death	16 May 1395	Rupert I
	Elisabeth of Nuremberg	Frederick V, Burgrave of Nuremberg (Hohenzollern)	1358	27 June 1374	6 January 1398 husband's accession	18 May 1410 husband's death	26 July 1411	Rupert III
	Matilda of Savoy	Amadeus, Prince of Achaea (Savoy)	1391/1400	30 November 1417		30 December 1436 husband's death	14 May 1438	Louis III
	Margaret of Savoy	Amadeus VIII, Duke of Savoy (Savoy)	1410s or 7 August 1420	18 October 1445		13 August 1449 husband's death	30 September 1479	Louis IV
	Margaret of Bavaria	Louis IX, Duke of Bavaria (Wittelsbach)	7 November 1456	21 February 1474	12 December 1476 husband's accession	24/25 February 1501		Philip
	Sibylle of Bavaria	Albert IV, Duke of Bavaria (Wittelsbach)	16 June 1489	23 February 1511		18 April 1519		Louis V
	Dorothea of Denmark	Christian II of Denmark (Oldenburg)	10 November 1520	26 September 1535	16 March 1544 husband's accession	26 February 1556 husband's death	31 May 1580	Frederick II

=== House of Palatinate-Simmern, 1559–1623 ===
Picture	Name	Father	Birth	Marriage	Became Electress	Ceased to be Electress	Death	Husband
	Marie of Brandenburg-Kulmbach	Casimir, Margrave of Brandenburg-Bayreuth (Hohenzollern)	14 October 1519	21 October 1537	12 February 1559 husband's accession	31 October 1567		Frederick III
	Amalia of Neuenahr	Gumprecht II of Neuenahr-Alpen, Count of Limburg (Neuenahr)	6 April 1539	25 April 1569		26 October 1576 husband's death	10 April 1602	Frederick III
	Elisabeth of Hesse	Philip I, Landgrave of Hesse (Hesse)	13 February 1539	8 July 1560	26 October 1576 husband's accession	14 March 1582		Louis VI
	Anne of Ostfriesland	Edzard II, Count of East Frisia (Cirksena)	26 June 1562	12 July 1583		22 October 1583 husband's death	21 April 1621	Louis VI
	Louise Juliana of Nassau	William the Silent (Orange-Nassau)	31 March 1576	23 June 1593		19 September 1610 husband's death	15 March 1644	Frederick IV
	Elizabeth Stuart of England and Scotland	James VI of Scotland (Stuart)	19 August 1596	14 February 1613		23 February 1623 husband's accession	13 February 1662	Frederick V

=== House of Wittelsbach, Bavarian branch, 1623–1648 ===
Picture	Name	Father	Birth	Marriage	Became Electress	Ceased to be Electress	Death	Husband
	Elisabeth of Lorraine	Charles III, Duke of Lorraine (Lorraine)	9 October 1574	6 February 1595	23 February 1623 husband's accession	4 January 1635		Maximilian I
	Maria Anna of Austria	Ferdinand II, Holy Roman Emperor (Habsburg)	13 January 1610	15 July 1635		October 1648; Became better known as Electress of Bavaria	25 September 1665	Maximilian I

== Second Electorate, 1648–1777 ==
=== House of Palatinate-Simmern, 1648–1685 ===
Picture	Name	Father	Birth	Marriage	Became Electress	Ceased to be Electress	Death	Husband
	Charlotte of Hesse-Kassel	William V, Landgrave of Hesse-Kassel (Hesse-Kassel)	20 November 1627	22 February 1650		1658 divorce	26 March 1686	Charles I Louis
	Wilhelmina Ernestine of Denmark	Frederick III of Denmark (Oldenburg)	20 or 21 June 1650	20 September 1671	28 August 1680 husband's accession	26 May 1685 husband's death	22 or 23 April 1706	Charles II

=== House of Palatinate-Neuburg, 1685–1742 ===
Picture	Name	Father	Birth	Marriage	Became Electress	Ceased to be Electress	Death	Husband
	Elisabeth Amalie of Hesse-Darmstadt	George II, Landgrave of Hesse-Darmstadt (Hesse-Darmstadt)	20 March 1635	3 September 1653	26 May 1685 husband's accession	2 September 1690 husband's death	4 August 1709	Philip William
	Anna Maria Luisa de' Medici	Cosimo III de' Medici, Grand Duke of Tuscany (Medici)	11 August 1667	29 April 1691		8 June 1716 husband's death	18 February 1743	John William

=== House of Palatinate-Sulzbach, 1742–1799 ===
Picture	Name	Father	Birth	Marriage	Became Electress	Ceased to be Electress	Death	Husband
	Elisabeth Augusta of Palatinate-Sulzbach	Joseph Charles, Count Palatine of Sulzbach (Wittelsbach)	17 January 1721	17 January 1742	31 December 1742 husband's accession	17 August 1794		Charles IV Theodore
	Maria Leopoldine of Austria-Este	Archduke Ferdinand of Austria-Este (Austria-Este)	10 December 1776	15 February 1795		16 February 1799 husband's death	23 June 1848	Charles IV Theodore

=== House of Palatinate-Zweibrücken, 1799–1806 ===
Picture	Name	Father	Birth	Marriage	Became Electress	Ceased to be Electress	Death	Husband
	Caroline of Baden	Charles Louis, Hereditary Prince of Baden (Baden)	13 July 1776	9 March 1797	16 February 1799 husband's accession	1 January 1806 elevated to Queen of Bavaria	13 November 1841	Maximilian II Joseph

== See also ==
- List of Bavarian consorts
