= Ludwig II of Württemberg-Urach =

German noble

Ludwig II (3 April 1439, in Waiblingen – 3 November 1457, in Urach) was the Count of Württemberg. He was the son of count Ludwig I and Mechthild of the Palatinate. He reigned from 1450 until 1457.

After the division of the County of Württemberg, by the Treaty of Nürtingen in 1442, he was raised in Urach, capital of the newly created County of Württemberg-Stuttgart. After the early death of his father, Ludwig I, a conflict over his tutelage arose. In the end, the count of Württemberg-Stuttgart, his uncle Ulrich V, won influence. Finally Ludwig II was declared full of age and took responsibility for the government at the age of 14.

Due to his ill health, he died prematurely in 1457 at the age of 18.

Ludwig II of Württemberg-Urach House of Württemberg Born: 3 April 1439 Died: 3 November 1457
Regnal titles
Preceded by Ludwig I	Count of Württemberg; 1450–1457	Succeeded by Eberhard V
