= Matilda of Savoy =

Electress Palatine (1390–1438)

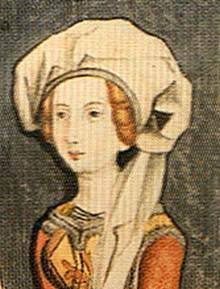
- Matilda of Savoy

Electress Palatine
- Tenure: 30 November 1417 – 30 December 1436
- Born: 1390
- Died: 1438 (aged 47–48)
- Spouse: Louis III, Elector Palatine
- House: Savoy
- Father: Amadeo, Prince of Achaea
- Mother: Catherine of Geneva

Matilda (or Mechtilde) of Savoy (1390–1438) was Electress Palatine as the second wife of the Elector Palatine Louis III, whom she married on 30 November 1417. She was a daughter of Amadeo, Prince of Achaea and Catherine of Geneva.

== Children ==
Matilda had the following five children:

1. Mathilde (7 March 1419 – 1 October 1482), married:
  1. in 1434 to Count Louis I of Württemberg
  2. in 1452 to Duke Albrecht VI of Austria
2. Louis IV, Elector Palatine (1 January 1424 – 13 August 1449)
3. Frederick I, Elector Palatine (1 August 1425 – 12 December 1476)
4. Ruprecht (27 February 1427 – 26 July 1480), Prince-elector archbishop of Cologne
5. Margarete (ca. 1428 – 23 November 1466), a nun at Liebenau monastery

Matilda of Savoy House of Savoy Born: 1390 Died: 1438
Royal titles
Vacant Title last held by Elisabeth of Nuremberg	Electress of the Palatinate; 1417–1436	Vacant Title next held by Margaret of Savoy
