= Ulrich V, Count of Württemberg =

Count of Württemberg (1413–1480)

Ulrich V
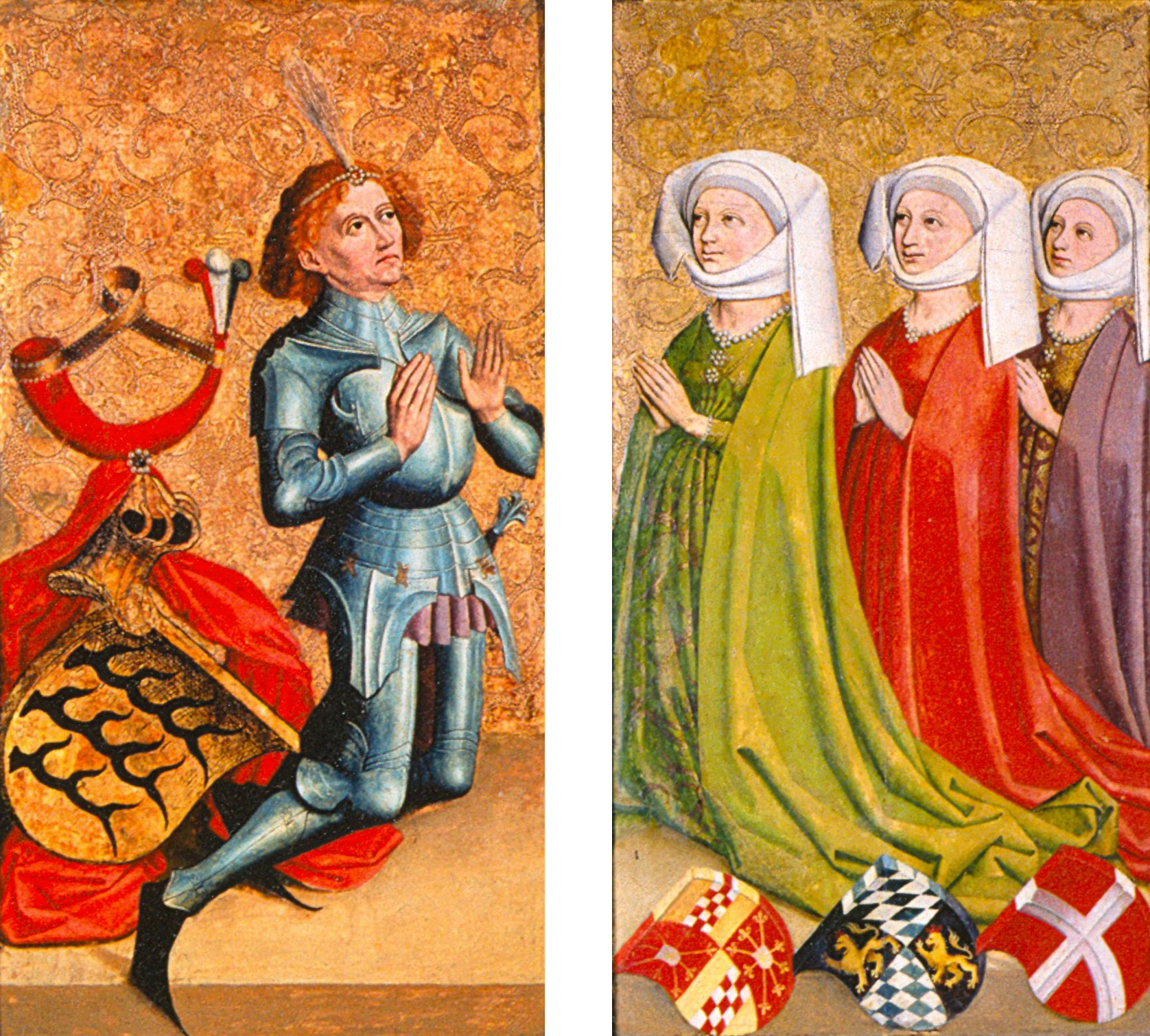
- Ulrich V with His Three (Successive) Wives, c. 1470–1480 (Note: From right to left, the figures are Ulrich, Margaret of Cleves, Elisabeth of Bavaria-Landshut, and Margaret of Savoy. The central panel of the triptych is now-lost, but it likely displayed a religious scene.)

Count of Württemberg
- Reign: 2 July 1419 – 25 January 1442
- Predecessor: Eberhard IV
- Successor: Treaty of Nürtingen
- Regent: Henriette of Mömpelgard (1419–1426)

Count of Württemberg-Stuttgart
- Reign: 25 January 1442 – 8 January 1480
- Successor: Eberhard VI
- Born: 1413
- Died: 1 September 1480 (aged 66–67); Leonberg, Württemberg
- Burial: 8 October 1480; Stiftskirche, Stuttgart
- Spouse: Margaret of Cleves (m. 1441; died 1444) Elisabeth of Bavaria-Landshut (m. 1444; died 1451) Margaret of Savoy (m. 1453; died 1479)
- Issue more...: Eberhard VI; Heinrich, Count of Montbéliard
- House: Württemberg
- Father: Eberhard IV, Count of Württemberg
- Mother: Henriette, Countess of Montbéliard

Ulrich V (1413 – 1 September 1480), nicknamed the Much-Loved (German: der Vielgeliebte), was Count of Württemberg from 1419 and then count of Württemberg-Stuttgart until his death in 1480.

== Life ==
Ulrich was born in 1413, the youngest child of Count Eberhard IV and his wife Henriette, Countess of Mömpelgard. Eberhard died unexpectedly of illness on 2 July 1419, while Ulrich and his older brother Ludwig were both minors. Consequently, Henriette became their guardian, together with a regency council of 32 Württembergers.

Ludwig reached maturity in 1426 and thereafter ruled alone until 1433 when Ulrich was admitted to the government. After some years of common government Ulrich wed Margaret of Cleves and put through the division of the county. This was confirmed 23 April 1441. Ulrich received the eastern and northern parts with the capital in Stuttgart. Ludwig the western and southern land part with the capital in Urach, as well as the territories in Alsace . The division which had been limited originally on four years was made permanent on 25 January 1442 by the Treaty of Nürtingen.

In 1444 Ulrich supported the house of Habsburg under King Friedrich III in the Old Zürich War in the fight against the Old Swiss Confederacy. Together with his allies which were margrave Albrecht Achilles of Brandenburg, the archbishop of Mainz Dietrich Schenk of Erbach as well as margrave Jakob I of Baden he formed the core of the Mergentheimer alliance which went advanced more and more against the imperial towns. These tensions found their culmination in the feud between margrave Albrecht and the imperial town of Nuremberg in 1449. Count Ulrich's main opponent under the imperial towns was Esslingen which reduced the income of the county Württemberg by rising it's his duties clearly. However, Ulrich did not succeed in winning a determining advantage in spite of winning multiple victories against Esslingen and other imperial towns.

In 1450 Ulrich gained, after the death of his brother Ludwig I, the guardianship on his nephews, the future counts of Württemberg-Urach Ludwig II and Eberhard V. This soon led to a quarrel with Frederick I, Elector Palatine, who likewise asserted claim to the guardianship. Ludwig II already died 1457. The estates of Urach passed to Count Eberhard V in 1459.

In 1458 Ulrich destroyed the castle of Widdern. This increased the tensions between him and Frederick. Two alliance blocs had developed in the German Empire. Ulrich joined the group of Frederick III, crowned emperor in 1452, and Margrave Albrecht Achilles of Brandenburg. Their main opponents were the brother of the imperial duke Albert VI of Austria, Frederick of the Palatinate and Duke Louis IX of Bavaria. In 1460 the first military encounters between the two groups occurred. After a short armistice, Frederick III once more proclaimed imperial war against Bavaria the following year. Together with Albrecht Achilles, Ulrich assumed leadership of the imperial forces against Bavaria. In the Mainz Diocesan Feud of 1461 to 1463, which broke out shortly after, he supported Archbishop Adolf II of Nassau against his deposed predecessor Diether von Isenburg and Frederick I of the Palatinate. After skirmishes, on 30 June 1462 a battle took place near Seckenheim, and Ulrich and his allies were defeated. They were taken captive by the Palatinate forces. Only on 27 April 1463 was Ulrich able to return to Stuttgart after payment of a ransom.

In 1473 went Ulrich and Eberhard V a house contract one which should regulate the common hereditary result and aspire to the reunion of both württembergian land parts.

On 8 January 1480, Ulrich ceded rule of Württemberg-Stuttgart to his oldest son Eberhard. He died the following September 1st at Leonberg during a hunting visit with his nephew Eberhard, future Duke of Württemberg. Following a funeral procession, Ulrich was buried at the Stiftskirche in Stuttgart on 8 October 1480.

== Wives and children ==
Known children of Ulrich V
Name	Birth	Death	Notes	Ref.
By Margaret of Cleves (married Stuttgart 29 January 1441) died 20 May 1444
Katharina	7 December 1441	28 June 1497	became a Premonstratensian nun at the monastery in Adelberg.	
By Elisabeth of Bavaria-Landshut, daughter of Henry XVI of Bavaria (married Stuttgart 8 February 1445) died 1 January 1451
Margarethe	1445-1450	21 July 1479	became a nun at Liebenau monastery.	
Eberhard VI	1 February 1447	17 February 1504	married Elisabeth of Brandenburg in 1467.	
Heinrich, Count of Mömpelgard	After August 1446	15 April 1519		
Ulrich	after 1445		died young	
Elisabeth	23 December 1450	6 April 1501	married Frederick II, Count of Henneberg-Aschach on 13 September 1469.	
By Margaret of Savoy (married Stuttgart 11 November 1453) died 30 September 1479
Margarethe	after 1453	21 April 1470	married Philipp I, Count of Eppstein-Königstein on 23 April 1469.	
Philippine	after 1453	4 June 1475	married Jakob II, Count of Horn between April and June 1470.	
Helene	after 1453	19 February 1506	married Kraft VI, Count of Hohenlohe-Weikersheim on 26 February 1476.	

== Ancestors ==
Ancestors of Ulrich V, Count of Württemberg

16. Eberhard II, Count of Württemberg
8. Ulrich, Count of Württemberg
17. Elizabeth von Henneberg-Schleusingen
4. Eberhard III, Count of Württemberg
18. Louis IV, Holy Roman Emperor
9. Elizabeth of Bavaria, Countess of Württemberg
19. Margaret II, Countess of Hainaut
2. Eberhard IV, Count of Württemberg
20. Stefano Visconti
10. Bernabò Visconti
21. Valentina Doria
5. Antonia Visconti
22. Mastino II della Scala
11. Beatrice Regina della Scala
23. Taddea da Carrara
1. Ulrich V, Count of Württemberg
24. Henry of Montfaucon
12. Stephen of Montfaucon
25. Agnes of Chalon
6. Henry of Orbe
26. John II of Chalon-Arlay
13. Margaret of Chalon-Arlay
27. Marguerite de Mello
3. Henriette, Countess of Montbéliard
14. Gaucher X de Chatillon, Viscount of Blaigny
7. Marie de Chatillon, Vicountess of Blaigny
15. Jeanne de Coucy

== See also ==
- History of Baden-Württemberg

== Bibliography ==
- Sönke, Lorenz; Dieter, Mertens; Volker, Press, eds. (1997). Das Haus Württemberg. Ein biographisches Lexikon (in German) (Online ed.). Stuttgart: LEO-BW.
- Cohn, Henry J. (1965). The Government of the Rhine Palatinate in the Fifteenth Century. Oxford University Press.
- Ward, A.W.; Prothero, G.W.; Leathes, Stanley, eds. (1934). The Cambridge Modern History. Vol. XIII. Cambridge at the University Press.

Ulrich V, Count of Württemberg House of Württemberg Born: 1413 Died: 1 September 1480
German nobility
Preceded by Eberhard IV	Count of Württemberg; 1419–1442 with Ludwig I	Vacant Treaty of Nürtingen Title next held by Eberhard V
New creation	Count of Württemberg-Stuttgart; 1442–1480	Succeeded by Eberhard VI
Preceded by Henriette of Mömpelgard	Count of Mömpelgard; 1444–1446 with Ludwig I	Succeeded by Ludwig I as sole ruler
