= Margaret of Savoy, Duchess of Anjou =

Margaret of Savoy
- Duchess of Anjou and Calabria; Countess of the Palatinate; Countess of Württemberg
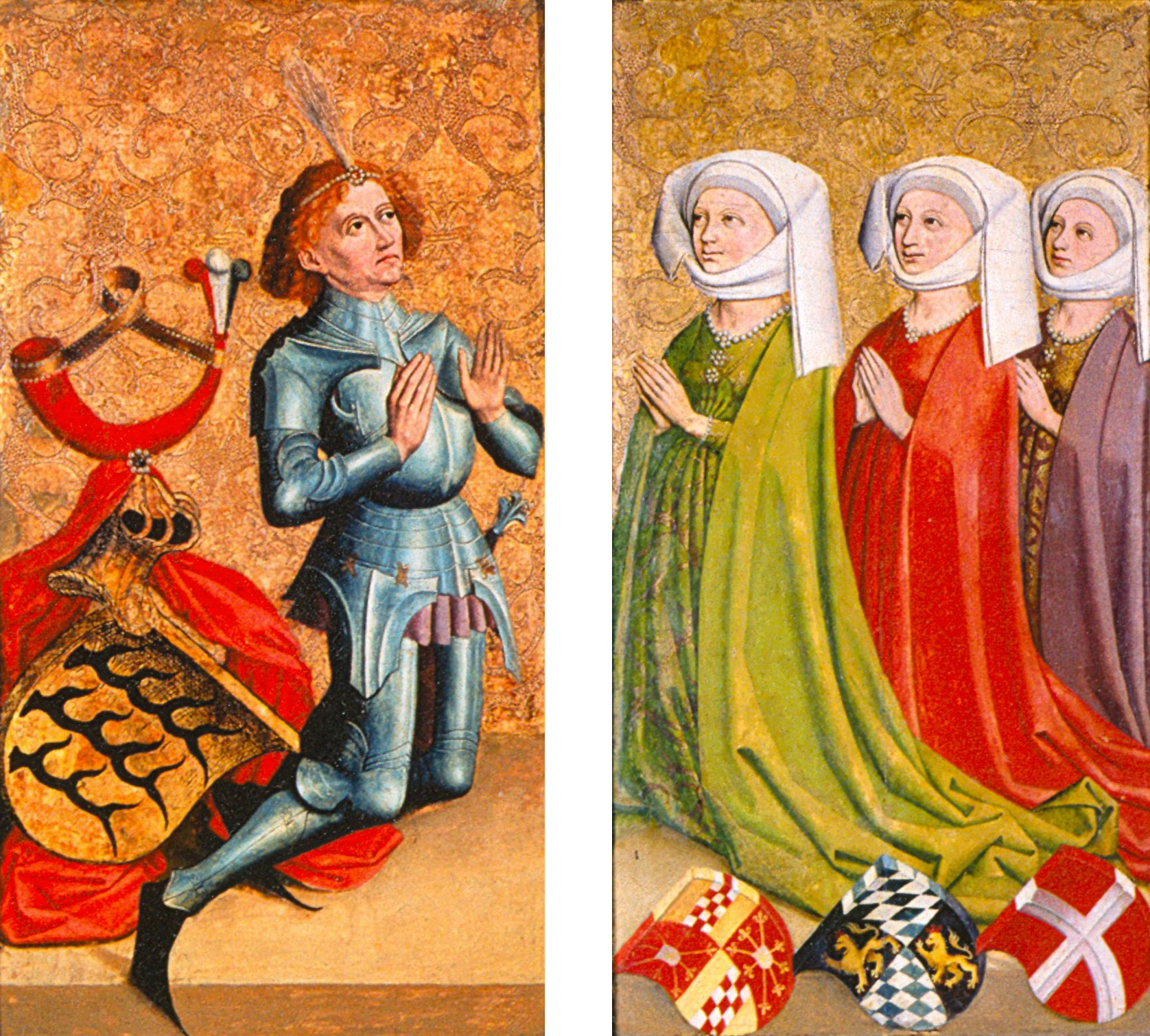
- Margaret of Savoy (far right), pictured with her third husband Ulrich V, Count of Württemberg, and his previous two wives.
- Born: 7 August 1420; Morges, Savoy
- Died: 30 September 1479 (aged 59); Stuttgart, Württemberg
- Spouses: Louis, Duke of Anjou (m. 1431; died 1434) Louis IV, Count Palatine of the Rhine (m. 1445; died 1449) Ulrich V, Count of Württemberg (m. 1453)
- Issue: Philip, Elector Palatine; Margarete, Countess of Eppstein-Königstein; Philippine, Countess of Horn; Helene, Countess of Hohenlohe-Neuenstein
- House: House of Savoy
- Father: Amadeus VIII of Savoy
- Mother: Mary of Burgundy

Margaret of Savoy (7 August 1420 – 30 September 1479) was the daughter of Amadeus VIII of Savoy and Mary of Burgundy. By her three illustrious marriages, she held a number of titles, including Duchess of Anjou, Duchess of Calabria, Countess of Maine, Countess of the Palatinate, and Countess of Württemberg.

== Family ==
Margaret was the daughter of Amadeus VIII, Count of Savoy and his wife Mary of Burgundy. A few of her siblings included Louis, Duke of Savoy and Mary, Duchess of Milan.

Her paternal grandparents were Amadeus VII, Count of Savoy and Bonne of Berry. Her maternal grandparents were Philip the Bold, Duke of Burgundy and Margaret III, Countess of Flanders.

== Marriages ==
=== First ===
Margaret married firstly Louis, Duke of Anjou, the titular King of Naples. He was a son of Louis II of Anjou and Yolande of Aragon. Their first marriage contract is dated on 31 Mar 1431. She became known as the Duchess of Anjou. They had no children, and he died in 1434.

=== Second ===
In 1445, Margaret next married Louis IV, Count Palatine of the Rhine. He was a son of Louis III, Elector Palatine and his second wife Matilda of Savoy. Margaret became Countess of the Palatinate through this alliance. Their marriage lasted only four years, as Louis died on 13 August 1449. They had one son:

- Philip, Elector Palatine (14 July 1448 – 28 February 1508).

=== Third ===
Thirdly, she married in Stuttgart 11 November 1453 Ulrich V, Count of Württemberg. They were both the other's third spouses. She added the title Countess of Württemberg to her many titles through this alliance. From this marriage they had the following children:

- Margaret (c. 1454 – 21 April 1470), married 23 April 1469 to Count Philip I of Eppstein-Königstein.
- Philippine (c. 1456 – 4 June 1475, Weert), married 22 April/4 June 1470 to Count James II of Horn.
- Helene (c. 1460 – 19 February 1506), married in Waldenburg 26 February 1476 to Count Kraft VI of Hohenlohe-Neuenstein.

Margaret died on 30 September 1479.

== Sources ==
- Cohn, Henry J. (1965). The Government of the Rhine Palatinate in the Fifteenth Century. Oxford University Press.
- Hand, Joni M. (2017). Women, Manuscripts and Identity in Northern Europe, 1350-1550. Routledge. ISBN 9781351536530.
- Kekewich, Margaret L. (2008). The Good King: René of Anjou and Fifteenth Century Europe. Palgrave Macmillan.

Margaret of Savoy, Duchess of Anjou House of Savoy Born: 7 August 1420 Died: 30 September 1479
Royal titles
Preceded by Yolande of Aragon	Duchess consort of Anjou; 1431–1434	Succeeded by Isabella, Duchess of Lorraine
Preceded by Yolande of Aragon	Countess consort of Maine, Provence, Forcalquier and Piedmont; 1431–1434	Succeeded by Isabella, Duchess of Lorraine
Preceded by Marie of Blois-Châtillon	Duchess consort of Calabria; 1431–1434	Succeeded by Isabella, Duchess of Lorraine
Preceded by Matilda of Savoy	Electress of the Palatinate; 1445–1449	Succeeded by Margaret of Bavaria
Preceded by Elisabeth of Bavaria	Countess consort of Württemberg; 1453–1479	Succeeded by Elisabeth of Brandenburg
