= Eberhard II, Duke of Württemberg =

German nobleman (1447–1504)

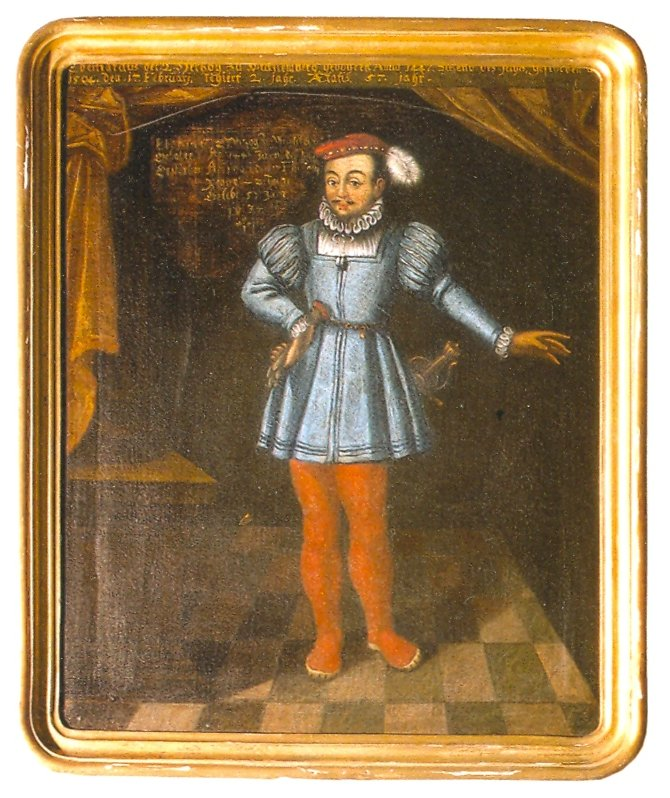
- Eberhard II of Württemberg
- Born: 1 February 1447; Waiblingen
- Died: 17 February 1504 (aged 57); Lindenfels Castle
- Buried: Collegiate church of Heidelberg
- Noble family: House of Württemberg
- Spouse: Elisabeth of Brandenburg
- Father: Ulrich V, Count of Württemberg
- Mother: Elisabeth of Bavaria-Landshut

Eberhard VI/II (1 February 1447 (?) in Waiblingen – 17 February 1504 at Lindenfels Castle) was a German nobleman. He was Count of Württemberg-Stuttgart from 1480 to 1496 as Eberhard VI, then Duke of Württemberg from 1496 to June 1498 as Eberhard II.

== Early life ==
Eberhard was the son of Ulrich V, Count of Württemberg and Elisabeth of Bavaria-Landshut. He spent much of his youth at the Burgundian court. In 1461 he took part in the coronation of King Louis XI of France in Reims. In 1462 he returned to Württemberg. Between 1465 and 1467 he married Margravine Elisabeth of Brandenburg, a daughter of Margrave Albrecht III of Brandenburg.

== Succession and reign ==
As early as 1477 a family treaty secured him the succession in Württemberg-Urach, which was ruled by Count Eberhard V, nicknamed the bearded one, who left no legitimate offspring. In 1480 he took over rule from his father Count Ulrich V. In 1482 he signed the Treaty of Münsingen with Eberhard V. This treaty reunited Württemberg by transferring power from Eberhard VI to Eberhard V of Württemberg-Urach. In return Eberhard VI was granted the succession to Eberhard V. Thus from 1482 until the death of Eberhard V, he was nominally sovereign, but in reality he was powerless. He soon fought against this deprivation of power, but could do nothing against his older rival. In 1489 his right of succession, previously over the whole of Württemberg, was even limited by Eberhard V to Württemberg-Stuttgart only. However, after the death of Eberhard, who had assumed the title of Duke Eberhard I in 1495, he achieved sovereignty over the whole of rule in all of Württemberg as Duke Eberhard II.

== Deposition, exile and death ==
But he soon ran into trouble with the nobility, who disempowered him, working in close collaboration with the Habsburg King Maximilian I. He had to flee to Ulm. As Eberhard found no support he had to accept the Arbitration of Horb of Maximilian I in 1498. He accepted an annual pension of 6,000 guilders in return for his deposition and banishment. In his place a council of the estates of the realm ruled with royal authority. This situation did not change until his nephew Ulrich, the son of his brother Heinrich, was prematurely declared to be of age in 1503 and assumed power as Duke of Württemberg. Eberhard was granted asylum by Elector Palatine Philip. He died in exile in Castle Lindenfels in the Palatinate in 1504. He is buried in the collegiate church of Heidelberg.

== Ancestors ==
Ancestors of Eberhard II, Duke of Württemberg

16. Ulrich, Count of Württemberg
8. Eberhard III, Count of Württemberg
17. Elisabeth of Bavaria
4. Eberhard IV, Count of Württemberg
18. Bernabò Visconti (= 26)
9. Antonia Visconti
19. Beatrice Regina della Scala (= 27)
2. Ulrich V, Count of Württemberg
20. Stephen of Montfaucon
10. Henry of Orbe
21. Margaret of Chalon-Arlay
5. Henriette, Countess of Montbéliard
22. Gaucher X de Chatillon, Viscount of Blaigny
11. Marie de Chatillon, Vicountess of Blaigny
23. Jeanne de Coucy
1. Eberhard II, Duke of Württemberg
24. Stephen II, Duke of Bavaria
12. Frederick, Duke of Bavaria
25. Elisabeth of Sicily
6. Henry XVI, Duke of Bavaria
26. Bernabò Visconti (= 18)
13. Maddalena Visconti
27. Beatrice Regina della Scala (= 19)
3. Elisabeth of Bavaria-Landshut
28. Albert III of Austria
14. Albert IV, Duke of Austria
29. Beatrix of Nuremberg
7. Margaret of Austria
30. Albert I, Duke of Bavaria
15. Joanna Sophia of Bavaria
31. Margaret of Brieg

== Literature ==
- Dieter Stievermann. Eberhard VI./II, in Sönke Lorenz, Dieter Mertens, Volker Press eds. Das Haus Württemberg: Ein biographisches Lexikon. Kohlhammer Verlag, Stuttgart 1997, ISBN 3-17-013605-4, S. 98–100

== Sources ==
- Hohkamp, Michaela (2007). "Sisters, Aunts, and Cousins: Familial Architectures and the Political Field in Early Modern Europe". In Sabean, David Warren; Teuscher, Simon; Mathieu, Jon (eds.). Kinship in Europe: Approaches to Long-Term Development (1300-1900). Berghahn books. pp. 91–104.
- Vaughan, Richard (1970). Philip the Good: The Apogee of Burgundy. Vol. 3. The Boydell Press.

Eberhard II, Duke of Württemberg House of Württemberg Born: 1 February 1447 Died: 17 February 1504
Regnal titles
Preceded by Ulrich V	Count of Württemberg-Stuttgart; 1480–1482	Succeeded by Eberhard I as Duke of Württemberg
Preceded by Eberhard I	Duke of Württemberg; 1496–1498	Succeeded by Ulrich
