= Elisabeth of Nuremberg =

Queen of Germany from 1400 to 1410

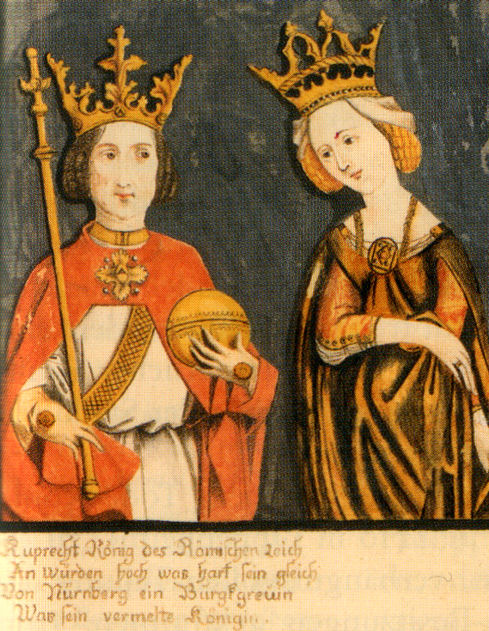
- Elisabeth with her husband, Rupert

Queen consort of Germany
- Tenure: 21 August 1400 – 18 May 1410

Electress Palatine
- Tenure: 6 January 1398 – 18 May 1410
- Born: 1358
- Died: 26 July 1411 (aged 52–53)
- Spouse: Rupert, King of the Romans (m. 1374; died 1410)
- Issue: Margaret, Duchess of Lorraine; Louis III, Elector Palatine; John, Count Palatine of Neumarkt; Stephen, Count Palatine of Simmern-Zweibrücken; Otto I, Count Palatine of Mosbach
- House: Hohenzollern
- Father: Frederick V, Burgrave of Nuremberg
- Mother: Elisabeth of Meissen

Elisabeth of Nuremberg (13 December 1358 – 26 July 1411) was Queen of Germany and Electress Palatine as the wife of Rupert, King of the Romans.

== Life ==
Elisabeth was born in 1358, into the Nuremberg branch of the House of Hohenzollern, as the daughter of Frederick V, Burgrave of Nuremberg and his wife, Elisabeth of Meissen, the daughter of Frederick II, Margrave of Meissen.

== Marriage ==
In Amberg, on 27 June 1374, Elisabeth married Rupert, the son and heir of Rupert II, Elector Palatine. Upon Rupert's succession to the Palatinate in 1398, she became Electress consort of the Palatinate. When Rupert was elected King of the Romans in 1400, Elisabeth became Queen of the Romans.

== Issue ==
1. Rupert Pipan (20 February 1375, Amberg – 25 January 1397, Amberg)
2. Margaret (1376 – 27 August 1434, Nancy), married on 6 February 1393 to Duke Charles II of Lorraine
3. Frederick (c. 1377, Amberg – 7 March 1401, Amberg)
4. Louis III, Elector Palatine (23 January 1378 – 30 December 1436, Heidelberg)
5. Agnes (1379 – 1401, Heidelberg), married in Heidelberg shortly before March 1400 to Duke Adolph I of Cleves
6. Elisabeth (27 October 1381 – 31 December 1408, Innsbruck), married in Innsbruck 24 December 1407 to Duke Frederick IV of Austria
7. Count Palatine John of Neumarkt (1383, Neunburg vorm Wald – 13–14 March 1443)
8. Count Palatine Stephen of Simmern-Zweibrücken (23 June 1385 – 14 February 1459, Simmern)
9. Count Palatine Otto I of Mosbach (24 August 1390, Mosbach – 5 July 1461)

== Death ==
Elisabeth survived her husband, who died on 18 May 1410, by a year, dying on 26 July 1411. She was buried alongside her husband in the Church of the Holy Spirit, Heidelberg.

== Sources ==
- Bogdan, Henry (2007). La Lorraine des Ducs (in French). Perrin.
- Thomas, Andrew L. (2010). A House Divided: Wittelsbach Confessional Court Cultures in the Holy Roman Empire, c.1550-1650. Brill.

Elisabeth of Nuremberg House of Hohenzollern Born: 1358 Died: 26 July 1411
Royal titles
Vacant Title last held by Sophia of Bavaria	Queen of the Romans; 21 August 1400 – 18 May 1410	Vacant Title next held by Barbara of Cilli
Vacant Title last held by Beatrix of Berg	Electress Palatine; 6 January 1398 – 18 May 1410	Vacant Title next held by Matilda of Savoy
