= Mechthild of the Palatinate =

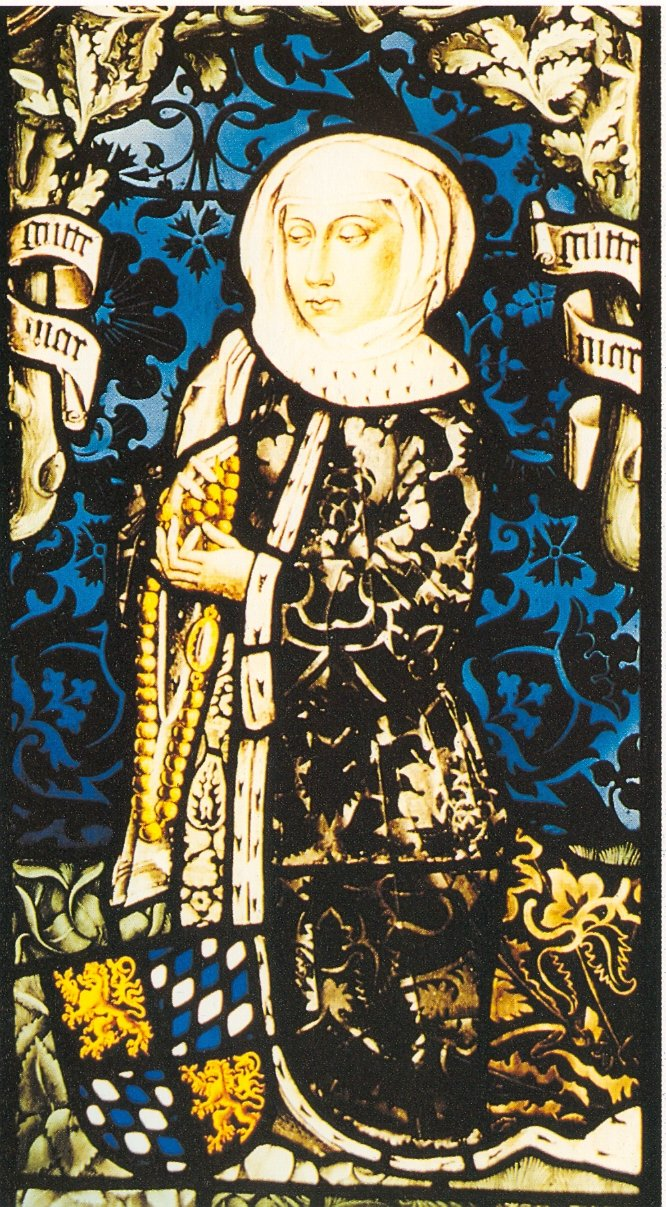
- Born: 1418
- Died: 22 August 1482 (aged 63–64)
- Burial: Charterhouse of Güterstein
- Spouse: Ludwig I, Count of Württemberg-Urach; Albert VI, Archduke of Austria
- Issue: Mechthild; Ludwig II, Count of Württemberg-Urach; Andreas; Eberhard I, Duke of Württemberg; Elisabeth
- House: Wittelsbach
- Father: Louis III, Elector Palatine
- Mother: Matilda of Savoy

Mechthild of the Palatinate (1418–1482) was a princess and major patroness of the literary arts in the 15th century.

A daughter of Ludwig III, Elector Palatine and Matilda of Savoy, she was married to Ludwig I, Count of Württemberg-Urach in 1436, when she was around fifteen years old. Five children were born from the marriage, but by age thirty-one, she had become a widow. She was remarried to the Archduke Albert VI of Austria. Following his death in 1463, she retired to her court at Rottenburg am Neckar. This court became a center of flourishing literary culture up until her death.

Some of the literary artists who she supported showed their appreciation for her through the dedication of literary works. After their initial meeting in 1460, Niklas van Wyle dedicated four of his translations to her.

Amongst many things, she was also known as a bibliophile. Jakob Püterich von Reichertshausen wrote a poem for her called Letter of Honor. In the poem, he lists and compares all the books that he and she had collected in their individual libraries. She had sent him a list of 94 of her books in advance of this poems creation for his use. Many of those in her possession, he had not even heard of before.

In collaboration with her son, Count Eberhard the Bearded of Württemberg, who was married to an Italian princess of the Gonzaga family, Barbara Gonzaga, she founded the University of Freiburg, in Freiburg im Breisgau, in 1457. She later co-founded the humanistic University of Tübingen in 1477.

She died on 22 August 1482 and was buried at the Charterhouse of Güterstein.

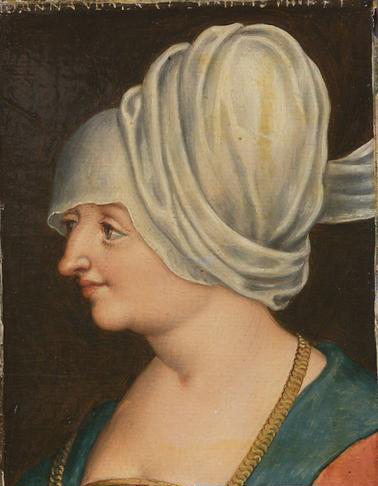
Mathilde of the Palatinate

== Issue ==
Ludwig I and Mechthild of the Palatinate had the following children:

- Mechthild (after 1436 – 6 June 1495), married in 1454 to Louis II, Landgrave of Hesse (1438–1471)
- Ludwig II (3 April 1439 – 3 November 1457), from 1450 count of Württemberg-Urach
- Andreas (11 April – 19 May 1443)
- Eberhard V (11 December 1445 – 24 February 1496), from 1457 count of Württemberg-Urach, from 1495 Duke Eberhard I. of Württemberg
- Elisabeth (4 October 1447 – 3 June 1505), married in 1470 to Johann II of Nassau-Saarbrücken in Saarbrücken (1423–1472), and in 1474 to Heinrich the Elder, Count of Stolberg (1436–1511)
