= Barbara Gonzaga (1455–1503) =

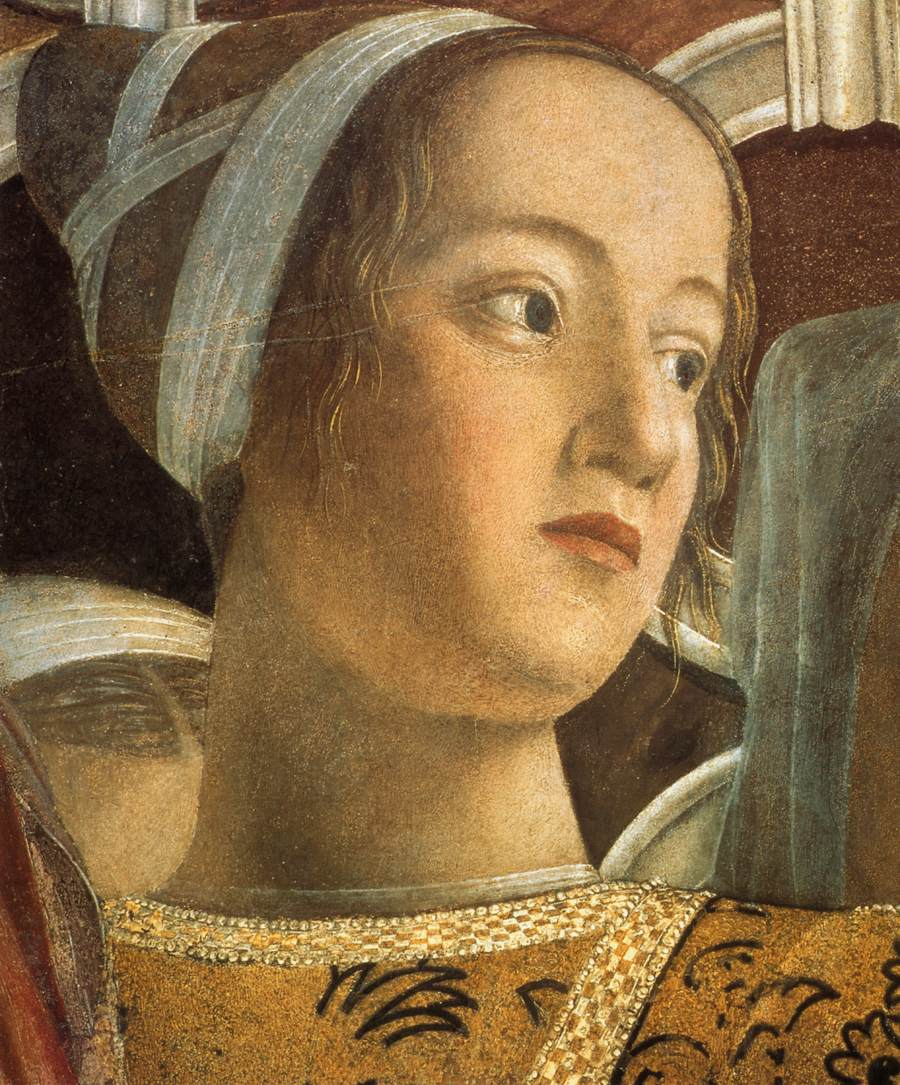
- Detail of The Court of Mantua by Andrea Mantegna, 1474. Currently in the north wall of the Camera degli Sposi at the north east tower of the Castel San Giorgio, Mantua.

Countess of Württemberg-Urach
- Tenure: 12 April 1474 – 21 July 1495

Duchess of Württemberg
- Tenure: 21 July 1495 – 24 February 1496
- Born: 11 December 1455; Mantua, Margravate of Mantua
- Died: 30 May 1503 (aged 47); Böblingen, Duchy of Württemberg
- Burial: Frauenkloster, Kirchheim unter Teck
- Spouse: Eberhard I, Duke of Württemberg (m. 1474; died 1496)
- Issue: Barbara of Württemberg
- House: Gonzaga (by birth); Württemberg (by marriage)
- Father: Ludovico III Gonzaga, Marquis of Mantua
- Mother: Barbara of Brandenburg

Barbara Gonzaga (11 December 1455 — 30 May 1503), nicknamed Barbarina, was an Italian noblewoman member of the House of Gonzaga and by marriage Countess consort (1474–1495) and first Duchess consort of Württemberg (1495–1496).

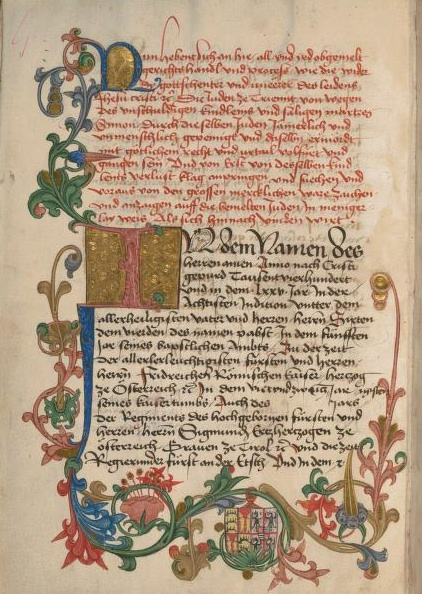
Coat of arms of Eberhard I and his wife Barbara Gonzaga

== Life ==
Born in Mantua, she was the twelfth child and seventh daughter of Ludovico III Gonzaga, Marquis of Mantua and his wife Barbara of Brandenburg. On her paternal side, she was the granddaughter of the first Margrave of Mantua, Gianfrancesco Gonzaga, and his wife Paola Malatesta da Rimini. On the maternal side, she was the granddaughter of John, Margrave of Brandenburg-Kulmbach (nicknamed the Alchemist) and his wife Barbara of Saxe-Wittenberg. She was named after both her mother and maternal grandmother.

Barbara received a good education at her father's court: in addition of her native Italian, she learned the German language and also the ancients Latin and Greek languages; also, she had knowledge in history and literature and was interested in art and culture. In 1467, Barbara's parents began searching for a suitable husband for her, and began negotiations for a marriage with Christoph, heir of the Margraviate of Baden-Baden, but they couldn't agree in the amount of the bride's dowry. In 1468, was considered for Barbara a marriage with Galeazzo Maria Sforza, Duke of Milan, and in 1472 was also considered King Casimir IV of Poland as a possible husband for Barbara; however, none of these arrangements came to fruition.

Finally, at the suggestion of Albrecht III Achilles, Elector of Brandenburg (Barbara's great-uncle), was arranged her marriage with Eberhard V, Count of Württemberg-Urach. The wedding took place in Mantua on 12 April 1474. According to the marriage contract, Barbara received 20,000 guilders as a dowry (15,000 were paid immediately, 5,000 upon arrival to her husband), rich robes and furniture, jewelry, silverware worth 9,000 guilders, a library and paintings.

Shortly after the wedding, Count Eberhard V returned to his domains. Barbara joined her husband a few months later, escorted by horse guards led by her brother Rodolfo Gonzaga. The cortege consisted of two carriages, four baggage wagons, 217 horses and 30 pack animals, they passed through Verona, Trento, Innsbruck, the Fern Pass and reached Kempten on 28 June, where Barbara was expected by envoys of her husband. From there the journey continued for Memmingen, Ulm and Blaubeuren to Urach. In the last section of the trip, Count Eberhard V joined the cortege, thus considerably increasing its size. During 4–7 July 1474 in the Urach Castle (who was renovated and enlarged for this occasion) and in the presence of numerous high-ranking guests (among them were the Bishops of Konstanz, Speyer and Augsburg, Elector Albrecht III Achilles, Philip, Count Palatine of the Rhine, Otto II, Count Palatine of Mosbach-Neumarkt and Margrave Charles I of Baden-Baden), celebrations were held on the occasion of the arrival of the new Countess. In total, 13 000 people visited the city during this time.

In 1483, after the unification of all the lands of the House of Württemberg under the leadership of Eberhard V and his proclamation as first Duke under the name of Eberhard I, the court moved from Urach to Stuttgart. According to contemporaries, Barbara enjoyed great influence over her husband. The new Duke had no formal education, but was a very curious person. Before the wedding, he traveled a lot, and even made a pilgrimage to the Holy Land. His educated wife introduced him to Italian art, music, and humanist philosophy; she was instrumental in founding the University of Tübingen, supporting her husband in the implementation of this project. Barbara also had a political talent, certainly inherited from her mother. In addition, she was interested in gardening, farming, and raising domestic animals. In 1491 she acquired a farm in Waldenbuch and a garden under the walls of the Stuttgart Castle.

On 2 August 1475 Barbara gave birth a daughter, who was named after her; unfortunately, the child lived only two months, dying on 15 October and buried in the charterhouse of Güterstein. This was Barbara's only pregnancy. The inability to give birth to an heir to her husband was probably the reason who accentuated the innate tendency of Barbara to depression. Already around 1480 some measures taken by Eberhard I shows that he no longer expected to produce legitimate descendants.

After the death of Eberhard I in 1496, the now Dowager Duchess moved to Böblingen Castle, where in 1501 she acquired another garden. Barbara maintained a correspondence with the Mantua court. In one of her last letters, she expressed a desire to return to her homeland. However, the wish of the Dowager Duchess remained unfulfilled: Barbara died on 31 May 1503 in Böblingen aged 47. She was buried in a Dominican Frauenkloster of Kirchheim unter Teck. Part of the inheritance left by her went to her relatives in Mantua.

Barbara was inmortalized in the famous mural The Court of Mantua paint in 1474 by Andrea Mantegna and displayed in the north wall of the Camera degli Sposi in the north east tower of the Castel San Giorgio in Mantua. The stained glass window depicting the Duchess of Württemberg in the University of Tübingen was made in modern times and is the author's fantasy. In Bad Urach, a high school bears her name.

Barbara Gonzaga (1455–1503) House of Gonzaga Born: 11 December 1455 Died: 30 May 1503
Preceded by Mechthild of the Palatinate	Countess of Württemberg-Urach; 1474–1495	Succeeded by none; title abolished
Preceded by new title	Duchess of Württemberg; 1495–1496	Succeeded by Elisabeth of Brandenburg
