= Eberhard I, Duke of Württemberg =

Eberhard I
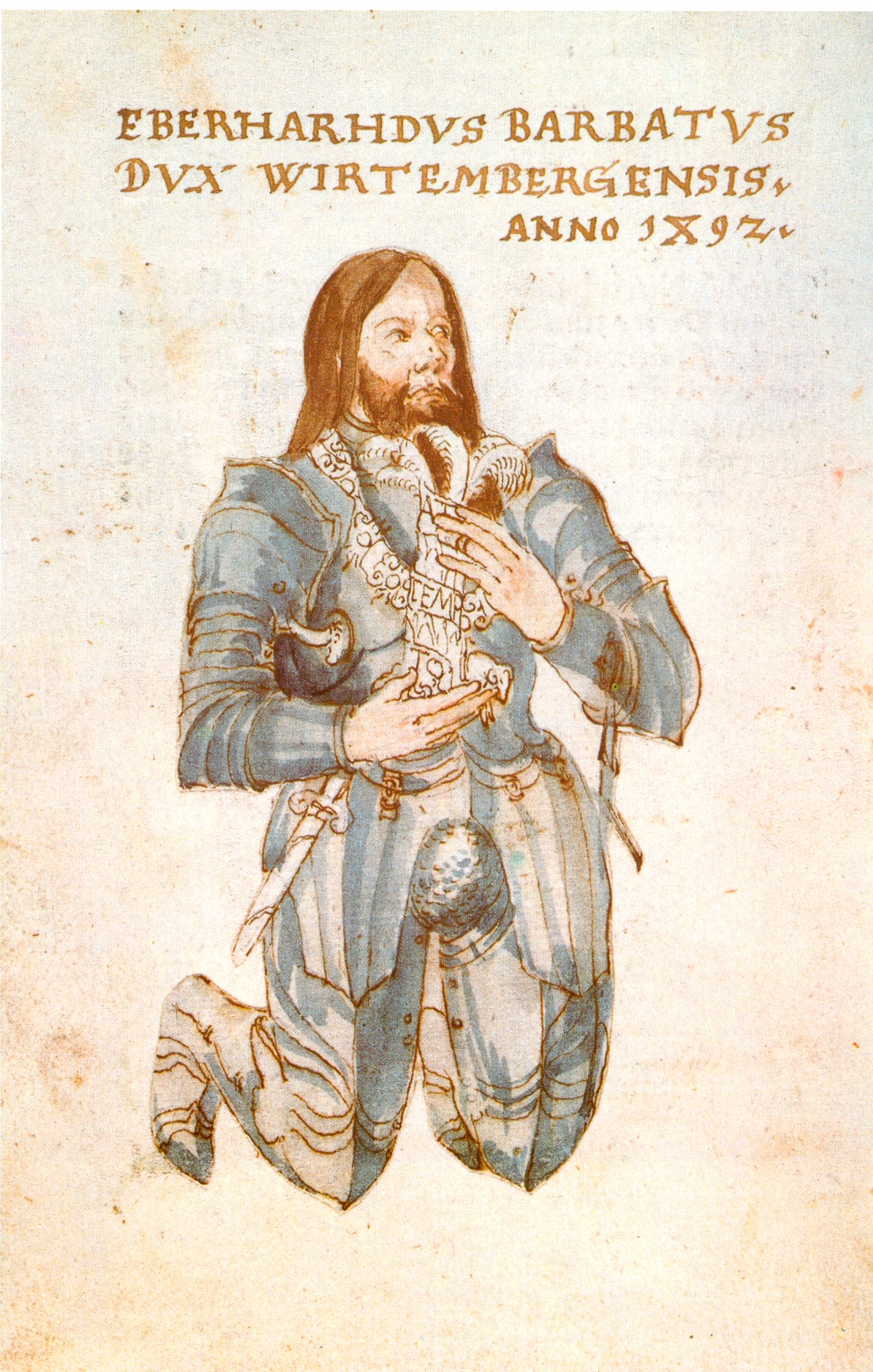
- Eberhard im Bart, 1492

Count of Württemberg
- Reign: 1459 - 21 July 1495
- Predecessor: Ludwig I
- Successor: Himself as Duke

Duke of Württemberg
- Reign: 21 July 1495 - 24 February 1496
- Predecessor: Himself as count
- Successor: Duke Eberhard II
- Born: 11 December 1445
- Died: 24 February 1496 (aged 50); Tübingen
- Spouse: Barbara Gonzaga
- Issue: Barbara
- House: Württemberg
- Father: Ludwig I
- Mother: Mechthild of the Palatinate

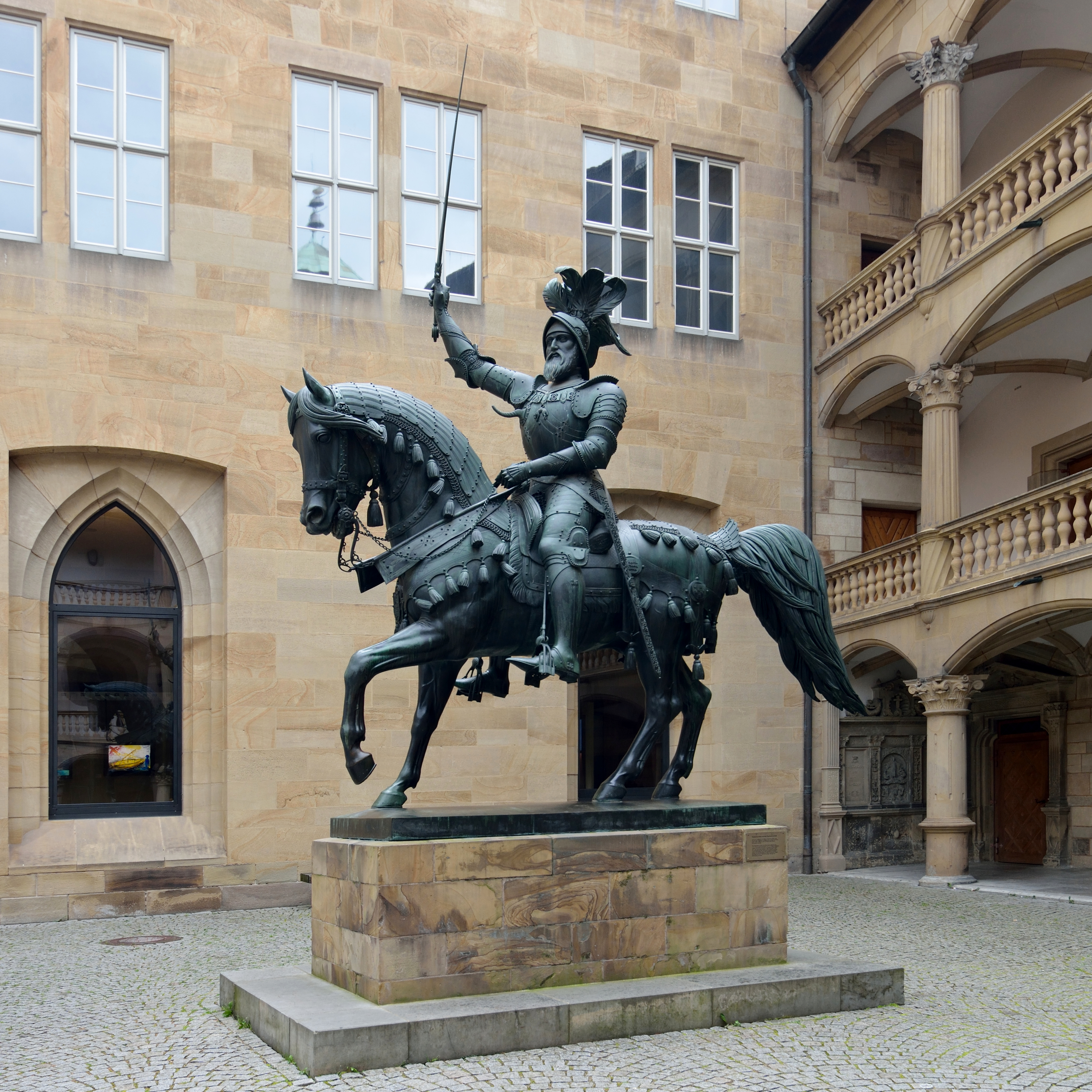
Monument of Eberhard I in the Altes Schloss in Stuttgart

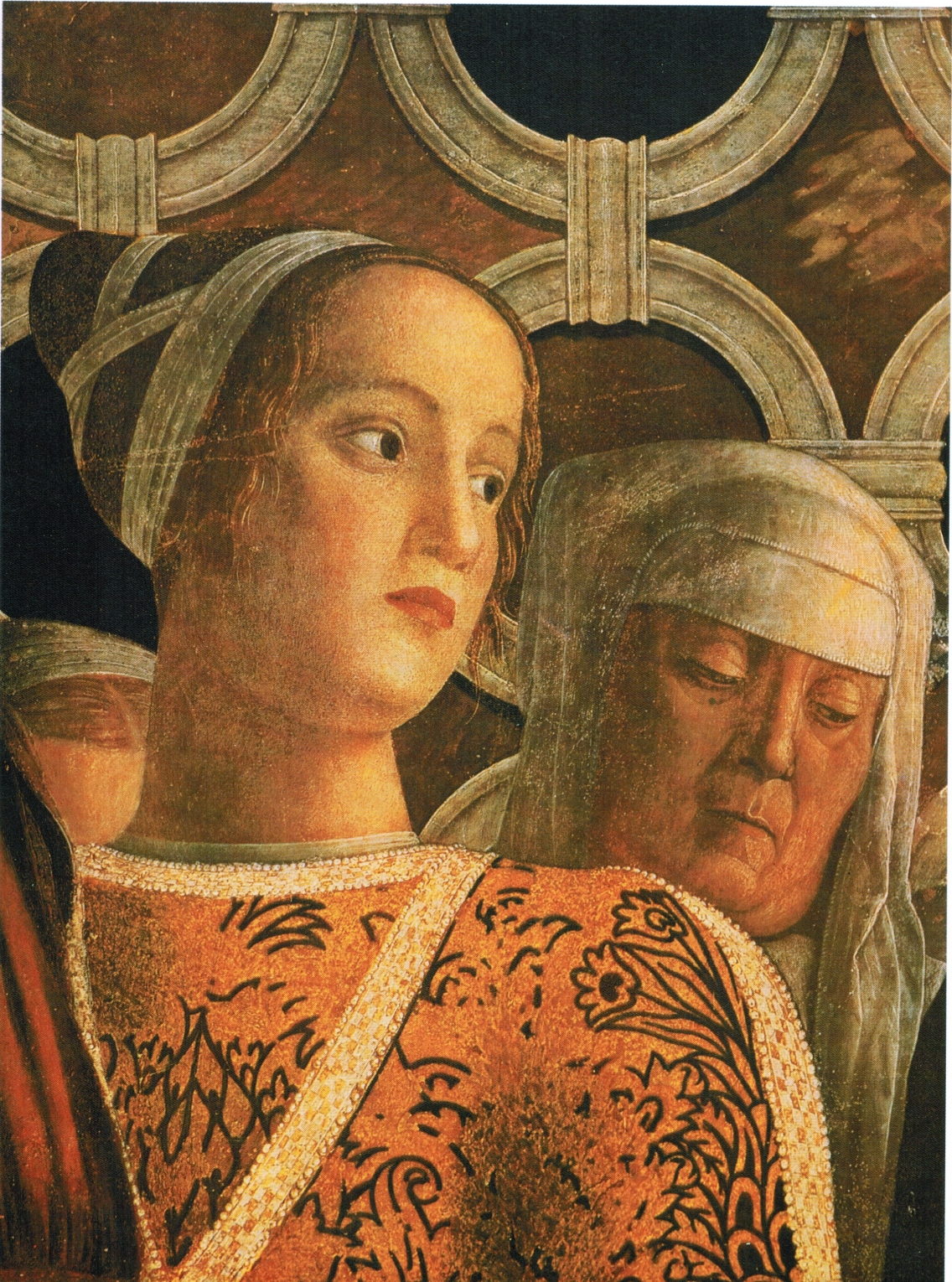
Barbara Gonzaga

Coat of arms adopted by Eberhard I in 1495 on the occasion of the elevation of Württemberg to a duchy

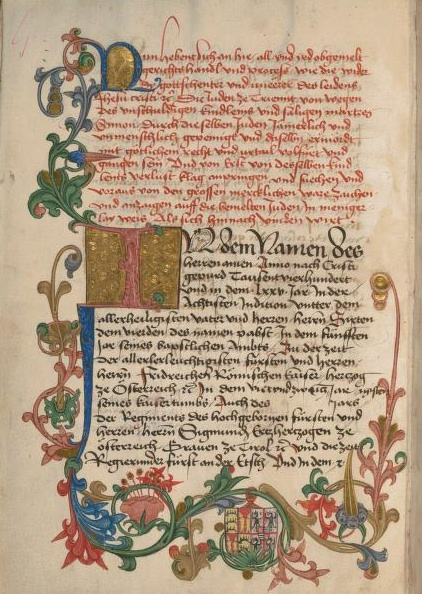
Coat of arms of Eberhard I and his wife Barbara Gonzaga

Eberhard I of Württemberg also known as Eberhard im Bart (Eberhard the bearded) (11 December 1445 – 24 February 1496) was the first Duke of Württemberg. After the death of his older brother in 1459 he became the Count of Württemberg-Urach as Eberhard V. In 1482 he signed the Treaty of Münsingen with his cousin Eberhard VI of Württemberg-Stuttgart reuniting Württemberg-Urach with Württemberg-Stuttgart under his rule. In exchange his cousin was designated as his heir. He moved the capital to Stuttgart and in July 1495 he was elevated to Duke of Württemberg by Emperor Maximilian I.

Eberhard was acquainted with a number of scholars and held education in high esteem. In 1477 he founded the University of Tübingen.

Eberhard died in 1496 and was succeeded by his cousin Duke Eberhard II (formerly Eberhard VI of Württemberg-Stuttgart).

== Early life ==
Born at Urach, he was the son of count Ludwig I and his wife Mechthild of the Palatinate, born as countess palatine by the Rhine.

Count Eberhard V officially took charge of the government of Württemberg-Urach when he was still underage; Württemberg had been divided since 1442. At first he had a legal guardian, a respected nobleman who had mentored his father as a youth, Rudolph von Ehingen of Kilchberg. However, in 1459, assisted by Frederick I, Elector Palatine, he threw off this restraint, and undertook the government of the district of Urach as Count Eberhard V. He neglected his duties as a ruler and lived a reckless life until 1468. During this time, a fencing manual was created for Eberhard in 1467 by Hans Talhoffer. The manuscript is currently held by the Bavarian State Library.

In 1468, he traveled to Jerusalem and became a knight of the Order of the Holy Sepulchre. To commemorate this he chose the palm as his symbol. He visited Italy and became acquainted with some famous scholars. Returning home, in Urach on 12 April 1474, he married a prestigious bride, Barbara, daughter of Ludovico III Gonzaga, Marquis of Mantua. The only child from this marriage, Barbara, was born in Urach on 2 August 1475 and died on 15 October of that year.

In 1477, Eberhard, whose motto was attempto ("I dare"), founded the University of Tübingen. He ordered the expulsion of all Jews living in Württemberg. He invited the Brethren of the Common Life and the community of devotio moderna to his country and founded collegiate churches in Urach, Dettingen an der Erms, Herrenberg, Einsiedel near Tübingen and Tachenhausen. He also took an interest in reforms of the church and monasteries. Despite not being able to speak Latin he held education in high esteem and had a great number of Latin texts translated into German. Parts of his large library have been preserved.

Finally on 14 December 1482 Eberhard reunified the two halves of Württemberg, Württemberg-Urach and Württemberg-Stuttgart, in the Treaty of Münsingen, with his cousin Eberhard VI of Württemberg-Stuttgart, later the second duke. He moved the capital to Stuttgart. In the same year, Pope Sixtus IV awarded him the Golden Rose. Eberhard, although a lover of peace, was one of the founders of the Swabian League in 1488, and assisted to release Maximilian I, from his imprisonment in Bruges in the same year. In 1492 he was awarded the Order of the Golden Fleece, by Maximilian, then King of Germany. In the same year, the treaty was finally sanctioned by the nobility.

Johannes Nauclerus, a humanist and historian, served at his court.

== Elevation to Dukedom ==
On 21 July 1495, at the Diet of Worms, the County of Württemberg was elevated to a Duchy. After Maximilian I's councilor, Veit von Wolkenstein, delivered a speech praising the House of Württemberg, Eberhard was dressed as an Herzog and bestowed a sword by Maximilian, who confirmed the treaty. Frederick III, Elector of Saxony and the Imperial Marshal, then led Eberhard I to Württemberg's seat in the Reichstag, between the Duke of Jülich and the Landgrave of Hesse. To confirm Württemberg's elevation to a Duchy, the Emperor hosted a banquet attended by his person, the electors, and the other princes of the Diet. In the hierarchy of the Holy Roman Empire, this put Württemberg's status above all the Margraves and Counts, but behind all the existing Duchies.

Eberhard died at Tübingen in 1496, and the succession passed to his cousin, who became Duke Eberhard II. He was first buried in the collegiate church Saint Peter auf dem Einsiedel, and later in the collegiate church of Tübingen.

== Legacy ==
In the 19th and 20th centuries, the patriotic historiography transfigured him. A bust of him was erected in Walhalla. In the Swabian anthem "Preisend mit viel schönen Reden" by Justinus Kerner, he is praised as: "Eberhard the one with the beard, Württemberg's beloved ruler." In this so-called song of the Württembergers, he is praised as the richest prince amongst the German princes, as he is able to rest his head on the lap of every one of his subjects without having fear for his life or property.

== Citations ==
Eberhard I, Duke of Württemberg House of Württemberg Born: 11 December 1445 Died: 24 February 1496
Regnal titles
Preceded by Ludwig II	Count of Württemberg; 1459–1495	Raised to Duchy
New title	Duke of Württemberg; 1495–1496	Succeeded by Eberhard II
