= Treaty of Nürtingen =

1442 treaty dividing Württemberg

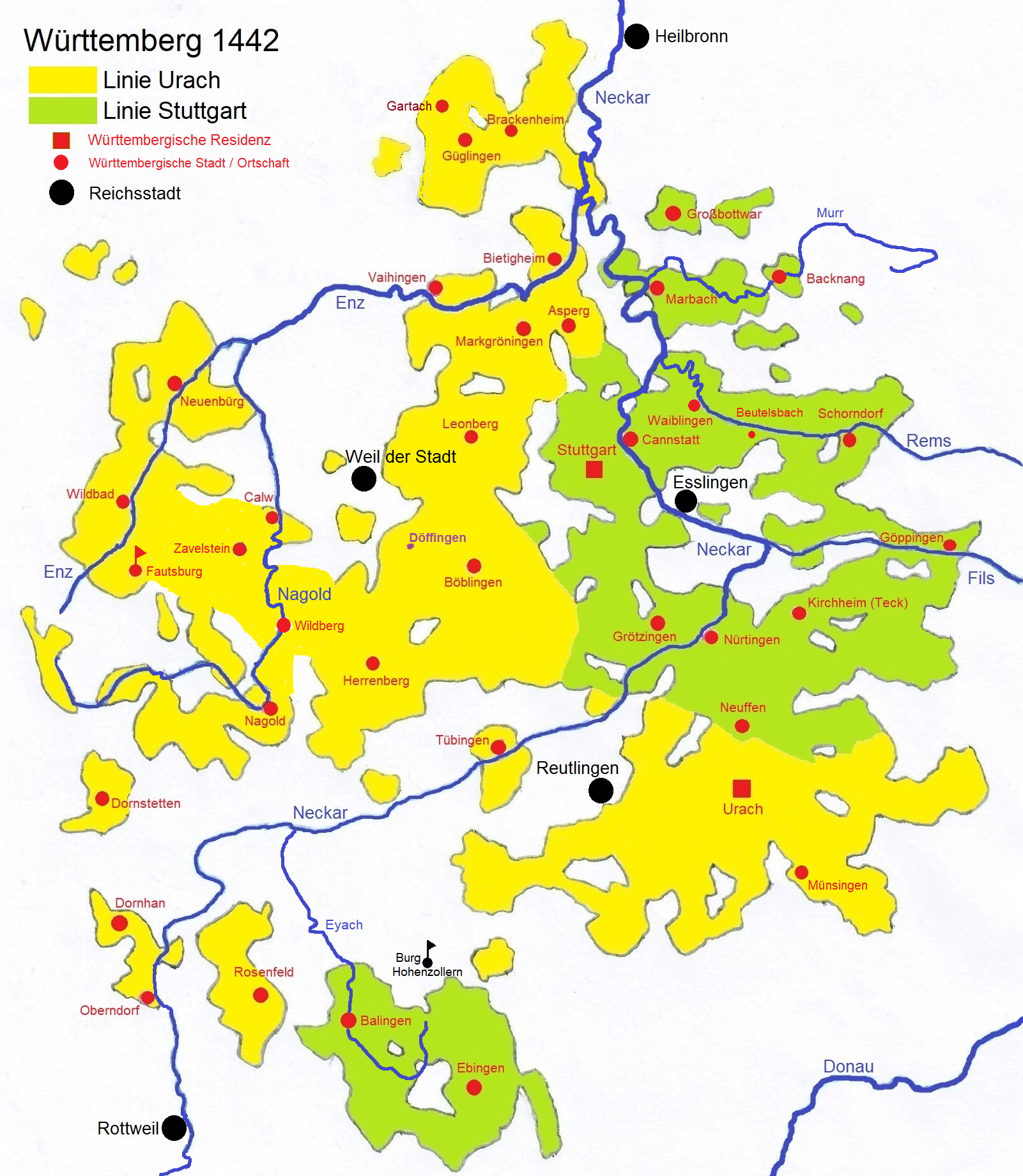
Division of Württemberg following the Treaty of Nürtingen

The Treaty of Nürtingen was an agreement signed on 25 January 1442 between Count Ludwig I and his brother Ulrich V that divided the County of Württemberg between them. It is named after the German town of Nürtingen (in modern Baden-Württemberg).

The County had first been divided on 23 April 1441 following Ulrich's marriage to Margaret of Cleves, with Ulrich receiving the lands west of the Neckar River and Ludwig receiving the lands east. This original division was intended to last four years, leaving Stuttgart as a shared city assigned to neither side, but was soon found to be unequal. In the amended permanent division stipulated by the Treaty of Nürtingen in 1442, the Stuttgart half went to Ulrich and included (among others) the cities of Cannstatt, Göppingen, Marbach, Neuffen, Nürtingen, Schorndorf and Waiblingen. The Urach half went to Ludwig and included (among others) the cities of Balingen, Calw, Herrenberg, Münsingen, Tuttlingen and Tübingen.

The division of Württemberg was reversed with the Treaty of Münsingen on 14 December 1482 and the Treaty of Esslingen in 1492.
