= Treaty of Münsingen =

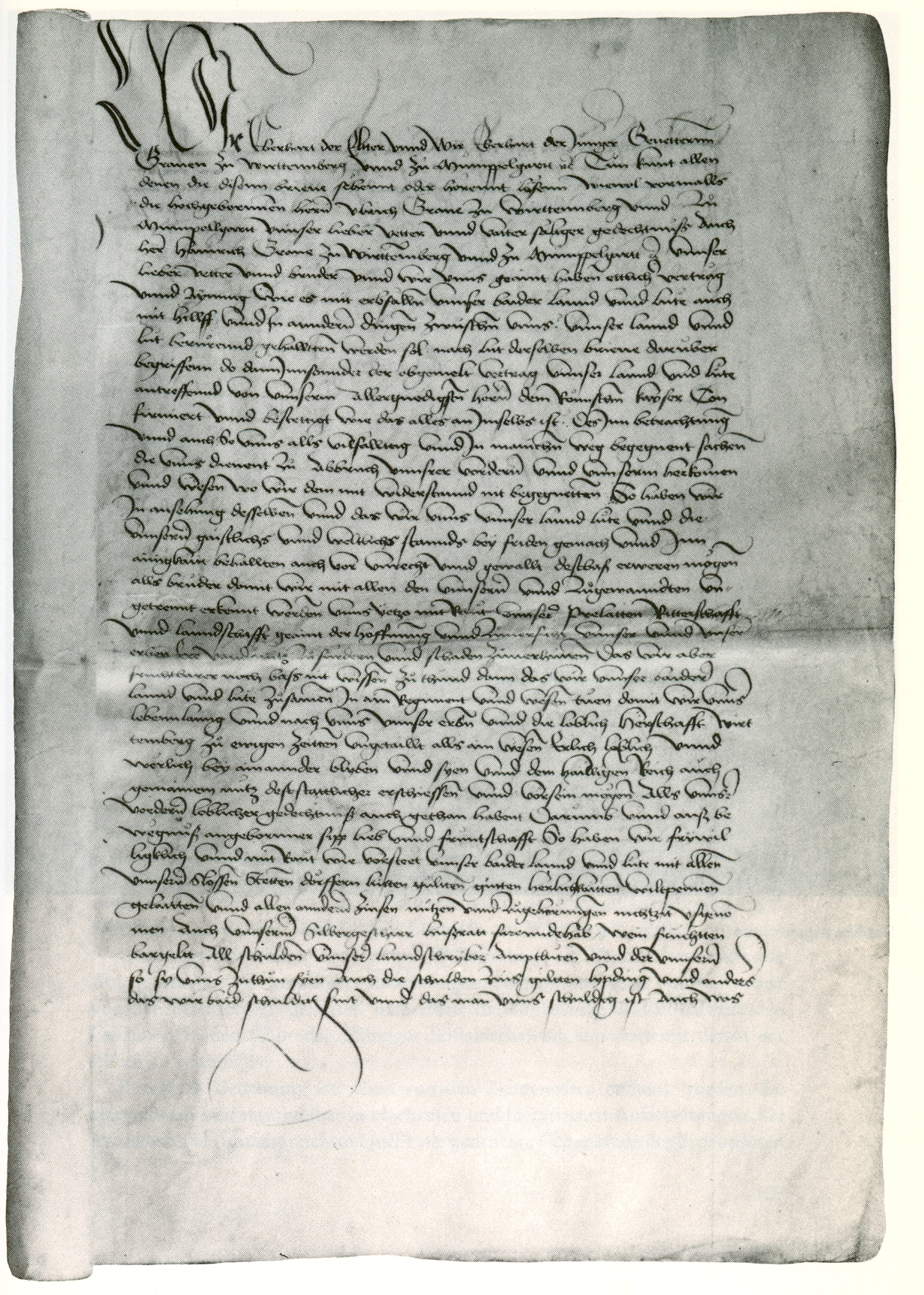
First page of the Treaty of Münsingen

The Treaty of Münsingen was signed on 14 December 1482. This accord officially reunited the divided County of Württemberg after it was divided by the Treaty of Nürtingen in 1442. The hereditary dispute between the Stuttgart part and the part of Urach were settled after 40 years. Residing in Urach, Count Eberhard V, later Duke Eberhard I of Württemberg, obtained rule and moved the capital to Stuttgart. The succession was laid down for the ruling count in the Stuttgart part of the country, Eberhard VI. With this treaty, that was worked out with collaboration of the council of Württembergian subjects, the indivisibility of Württemberg and the primogeniture became contractual. The treaty prevented the division of Württemberg and thus was an important step to the exaltation to a duchy in 1495. The original document is stored in the main public record office in Stuttgart.

== See also ==
- History of Württemberg
- List of treaties
