= Albert VI of Austria =

Archduke of Austria from 1457 to 1463

Albert VI
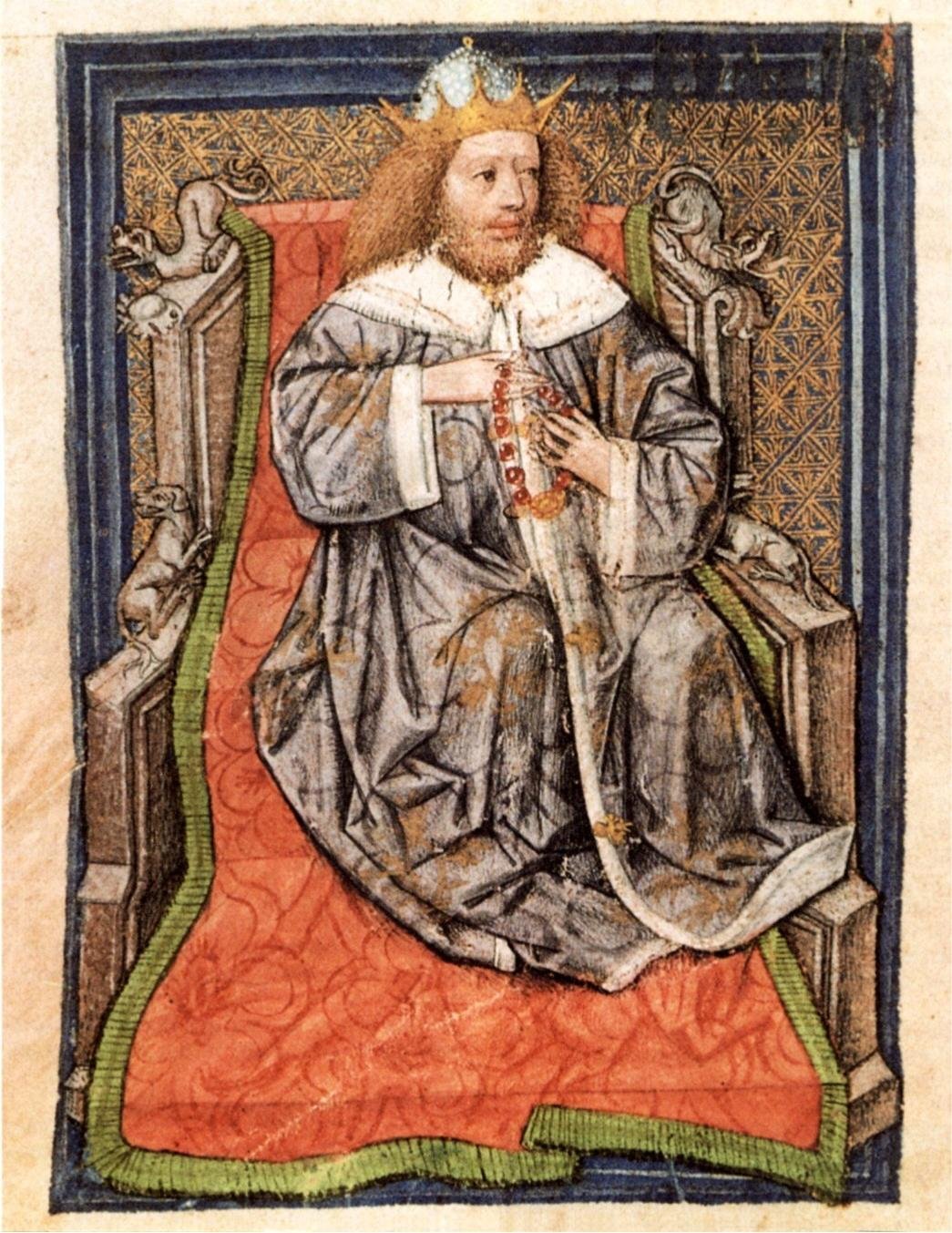

Duke of Styria, Carinthia, and Carniola
- Reign: 10 June 1424 – 2 December 1463
- Predecessor: Ernest
- Successor: Frederick V

Archduke of Austria
- Reign: 23 November 1457 – 2 December 1463
- Predecessor: Ladislaus
- Successor: Frederick V
- Born: 18 December 1418; Vienna, Duchy of Austria
- Died: 2 December 1463 (aged 44); Vienna, Archduchy of Austria
- Burial: St. Stephen's Cathedral
- Spouse: Mechthild of the Palatinate
- House: Habsburg
- Father: Ernest, Duke of Austria
- Mother: Cymburgis of Masovia

Albert VI (German: Albrecht VI.; 18 December 1418 – 2 December 1463), a member of the House of Habsburg, was Duke of Austria from 1424, elevated to Archduke in 1453. As a scion of the Leopoldian line, he ruled over the Inner Austrian duchies of Styria, Carinthia and Carniola from 1424, from 1457 also over the Archduchy of Austria until his death, rivalling with his elder brother Emperor Frederick III. According to tradition, Albert, later known as the Prodigal, was the exact opposite of Frederick: energetic and inclined to thoughtlessness.

== Biography ==
Albert was born in Vienna, the son of the Inner Austrian duke Ernest the Iron from his second marriage with the Piast princess Cymburgis of Masovia. Still minors upon the death of their father in 1424, he and his brother remained under the tutelage of their uncle Duke Frederick IV of the Empty Pockets, who ruled over Further Austria and the County of Tyrol.

Coming of age in 1436, Albert, though a junior heir of Inner Austria, received no full rulership anywhere for a long time, which caused friction in his relations with his elder brother Frederick V. When in 1439 both Duke Frederick IV of Further Austria and King Albert II of Germany, Duke of Austria died, Archduke Frederick assumed the guardianship over their minor sons Sigismund and Ladislaus the Posthumous. As Habsburg patriarch, heir of Inner Austria and regent of Further Austria, Tyrol and the Austria proper, he then ruled over all the dynasty's hereditary lands. At that stage, Albert began quarreling with his brother and in 1446 claimed the lands of Further Austria from him.

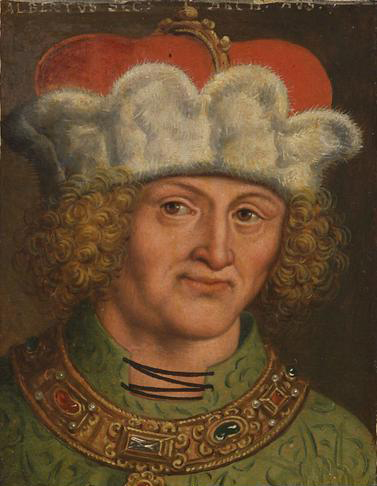
Albert VI of Austria

The conflict between the brothers escalated when Duke Ladislaus Posthumous of Austria died childless in 1457 and Frederick, Holy Roman Emperor since 1452, came into his inheritance. Albert rose up and in 1458 occupied the western part of the Austrian archduchy "above the Enns" (later known as Upper Austria), which he ruled at Linz as a separate principality (Fürstentum Österreich ob der Enns) and, quite small, his portion of Habsburg patrimony. After laying siege to Frederick in the Vienna Hofburg, he also took over the reign of Austria below the Enns (now Lower Austria) in 1462. Albert however died childless the next year and all his lands fell back to his elder brother.

In 1452 Albert had married Mechthild of the Palatinate, daughter of Count Palatine Louis III. Albert is credited for founding the University of Freiburg in 1457.

== Male-line family tree ==
House of Habsburg

Original line
Albert; Count of Habsburg c. 1188–1239
Rudolf I of Germany c. 1218–1291
Albert I of Germany; 1255–1308	Hartmann; 1263–1281	Rudolf II; Duke of Austria; 1270–1290
Rudolf I of Bohemia; 1281–1307	Frederick the Fair c. 1289–1330	Leopold I Duke of Austria; 1290–1326	Albert II; Duke of Austria; 1298–1358	Henry the Friendly; 1299–1327	Otto; Duke of Austria; 1301–1339	John; Parricida c. 1290–1312/1313
Albertinian line	Leopoldian line
Rudolf IV; Duke of Austria; 1339–1365	Frederick III; 1347–1362	Albert III; Duke of Austria; 1349–1395	Leopold III; Duke of Austria; 1351–1386	Frederick II; Duke of Austria; 1327–1344	Leopold II; Duke of Austria; 1328–1344
Albert IV; Duke of Austria; 1377–1404	William; Duke of Austria c. 1370–1406	Leopold IV; Duke of Austria; 1371–1411	Ernest; Duke of Austria; 1377–1424	Frederick IV; Duke of Austria; 1382–1439
Albert II of Germany; 1397–1439	Frederick III; HRE; 1415–1493	Albert VI; Archduke of Austria; 1418–1463	Sigismund; Archduke of Austria; 1427–1496
Ladislaus the Posthumous; 1440–1457	Maximilian I HRE; 1459–1519
Philip I of Castile; 1478–1506
Spanish / Iberian line	Austrian / HRE line
Charles V HRE; 1500–1558	Ferdinand I HRE; 1503–1564
Philip II of Spain; 1527–1598	Maximilian II; HRE; 1527–1576	Ferdinand II; Archduke of Austria; 1529–1595	Charles II; Archduke of Austria; 1540–1590
Carlos; Prince of Asturias; 1545–1568	Philip III of Spain; 1578–1621	Rudolf II; HRE; 1552–1612	Ernest of Austria; 1553–1595	Matthias; HRE; 1557–1619	Maximilian III; Archduke of Austria; 1558–1618	Albert VII; Archduke of Austria; 1559–1621	Wenceslaus; Archduke of Austria; 1561–1578	Andrew; Margrave of Burgau; 1558–1600	Charles; Margrave of Burgau; 1560–1618	Ferdinand II; HRE; 1578–1637	Maximilian Ernest of Austria; 1583–1616	Leopold V Archduke of Austria; 1586–1632	Charles of Austria; 1590–1624
Philip IV of Spain; 1605–1665	Charles of Austria; 1607–1632	Ferdinand of Austria; 1609–1641	John-Charles of Austria; 1605–1619	Ferdinand III; HRE; 1608–1657	Leopold Wilhelm of Austria; 1614–1662	Ferdinand Charles; Archduke of Austria; 1628–1662	Sigismund Francis; Archduke of Austria; 1630–1665
Balthasar Charles; Prince of Asturias; 1629–1646	Charles II of Spain; 1661–1700	Ferdinand IV; King of the Romans; 1633–1654	Leopold I HRE; 1640–1705	Charles Joseph of Austria; 1649–1664
Joseph I HRE; 1678–1711	Charles VI; HRE; 1685–1740
Lorraine
Maria Theresa; HRE; 1740–1780	Francis I HRE; 1745–1765
Habsburg-Lorraine
Joseph II; HRE; 1765–1790	Leopold II; HRE; 1790–1792
Francis II; HRE; 1792–1806

== Notes ==
Albert VI of Austria House of Habsburg Born: 18 December 1418 Died: 2 December 1463
Preceded by: Ernest	Duke of Inner Austria (Styria, Carinthia, and Carniola); 1424–1463 with Frederick V	Succeeded by: Frederick V
Preceded by: Ladislaus	Archduke of Austria; 1457–1463 with Frederick V	Succeeded by: Frederick V
