= County of Württemberg =

State of the Holy Roman Empire (1083–1495)

Coordinates: 48°47′N 9°11′E

County of Württemberg Grafschaft Württemberg (German)
- 1083–1495
- Banner of arms Coat of arms

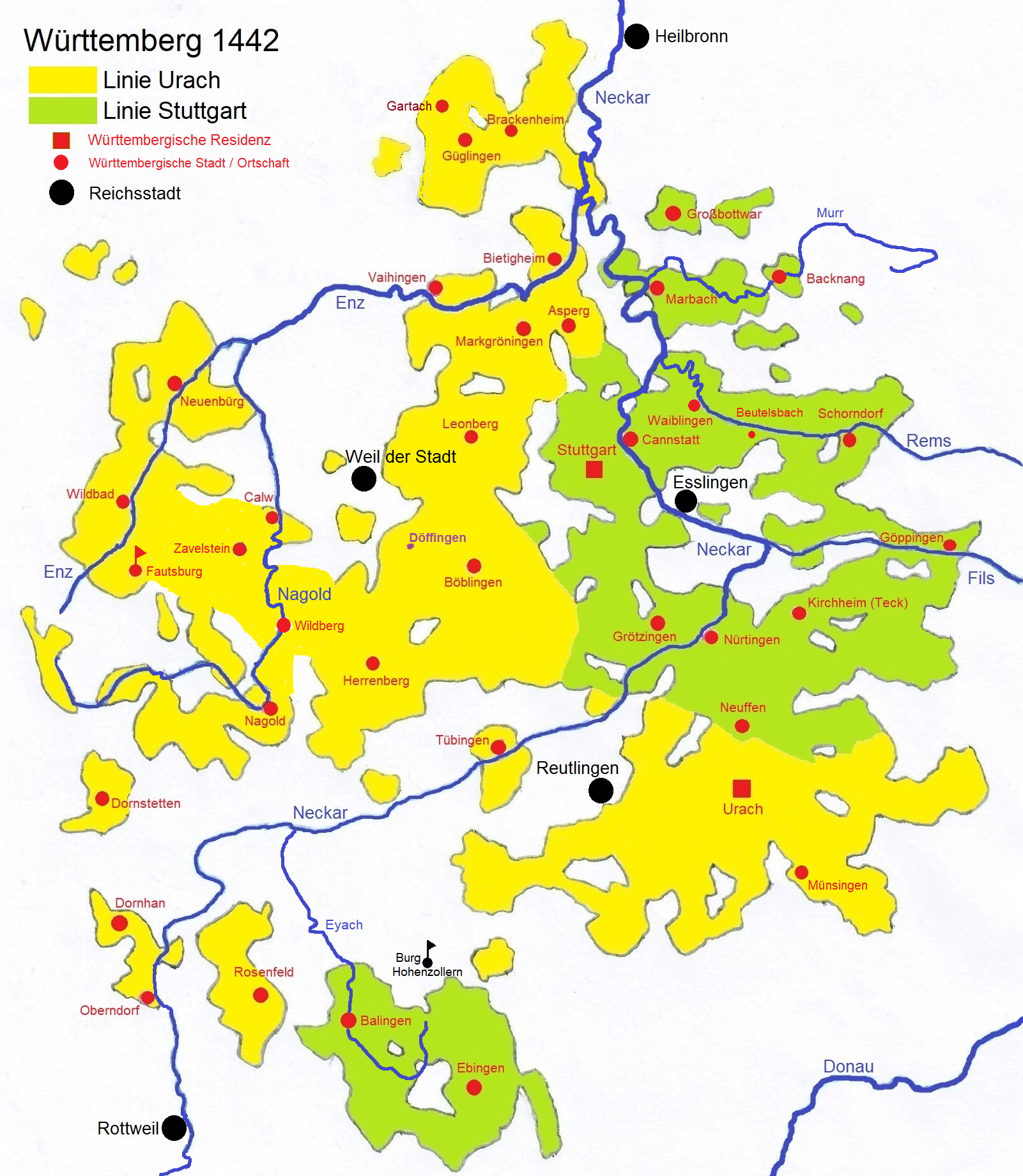
- Division of Württemberg by the Treaty of Nürtingen
- Status: County
- Capital: Stuttgart
- Common languages: Swabian German
- Religion: Roman Catholic
- Count of Württemberg
  - ca 1089–1122 (first count): Conrad I
  - 1457–96 (last count): Eberhard V
- Historical era: Middle Ages
  - County founded by Conrad I: before 1081 1083
  - Treaty of Nürtingen divides county: 1442
  - Treaty of Münsingen reunites county: 1482
  - Raised to duchy: 1495
Preceded by	Succeeded by
Duchy of Swabia	Duchy of Württemberg
- Today part of: Germany

The County of Württemberg (German: Grafschaft Württemberg) was a historical territory with origins in the realm of the House of Württemberg, the heart of the old Duchy of Swabia. Its capital was Stuttgart. From the 12th century until 1495, it was a county within the Holy Roman Empire. It later became a duchy then an electorate and, after the breakup of the Holy Roman Empire, a kingdom.

== Etymology ==
This county was named after a hill of the same name in the district of Untertürkheim in Rotenberg, Stuttgart, on which Wattenberg Castle stood until 1819. Until about 1350, the county appeared in records only with the spelling "Wirtenberg".

== History ==
The House of Württemberg first appeared in the late 11th century. The first family member mentioned in records was Konrad I, in 1081, who is believed to have built the castle. The Württembergs became counts in the 12th century. In 1250, the House of Hohenstaufen's reign over the Duchy of Swabia ended; this allowed the Württembergs to expand their territory to include the duchy. Stuttgart (which later became the capital) was included within the county as a result of the marriage between Ulrich I and Mechthild of Baden in 1251.

The Württemberg territory expanded further under the rule of Ulrich III, Eberhard II and Eberhard III. Under Eberhard III, Württemberg assimilated the County of Montbéliard (German: Mömpelgard) through the betrothal of his son, Eberhard IV, to Henriette, Countess of Montbéliard in 1397.

In 1442, the Treaty of Nürtingen was signed between Ulrich V and his brother Ludwig I. As a result, Württemberg was divided into two parts. Ulrich received the Stuttgart area (Württemberg-Stuttgart), including the towns of Bad Cannstatt, Göppingen, Marbach am Neckar, Neuffen, Nürtingen, Schorndorf and Waiblingen. Ludwig received the Bad Urach section (Württemberg-Urach), including the towns of Balingen, Calw, Herrenberg, Münsingen, Tuttlingen and Tübingen. This section grew to include the County of Montbéliard as well after the death of Henriette in 1444.

As a result of the Treaty of Münsingen in 1482 and the Treaty of Esslingen in 1492, Count Eberhard V succeeded in reuniting Württemberg and rose to the rank of duke. The childless Eberhard became the sole ruler of this reunited country. The reigning Count Eberhard VI of Württemberg-Stuttgart was designated as his successor, and was to govern in association with a committee of twelve "honourables", representatives of the country's two estates (lords and commons).

In 1495, under the Imperial Diet of Worms summoned by Emperor Maximilian I, the county became the Duchy of Württemberg.
