= Louis III, Elector Palatine =

Elector Palatine from 1410 to 1436

Louis III
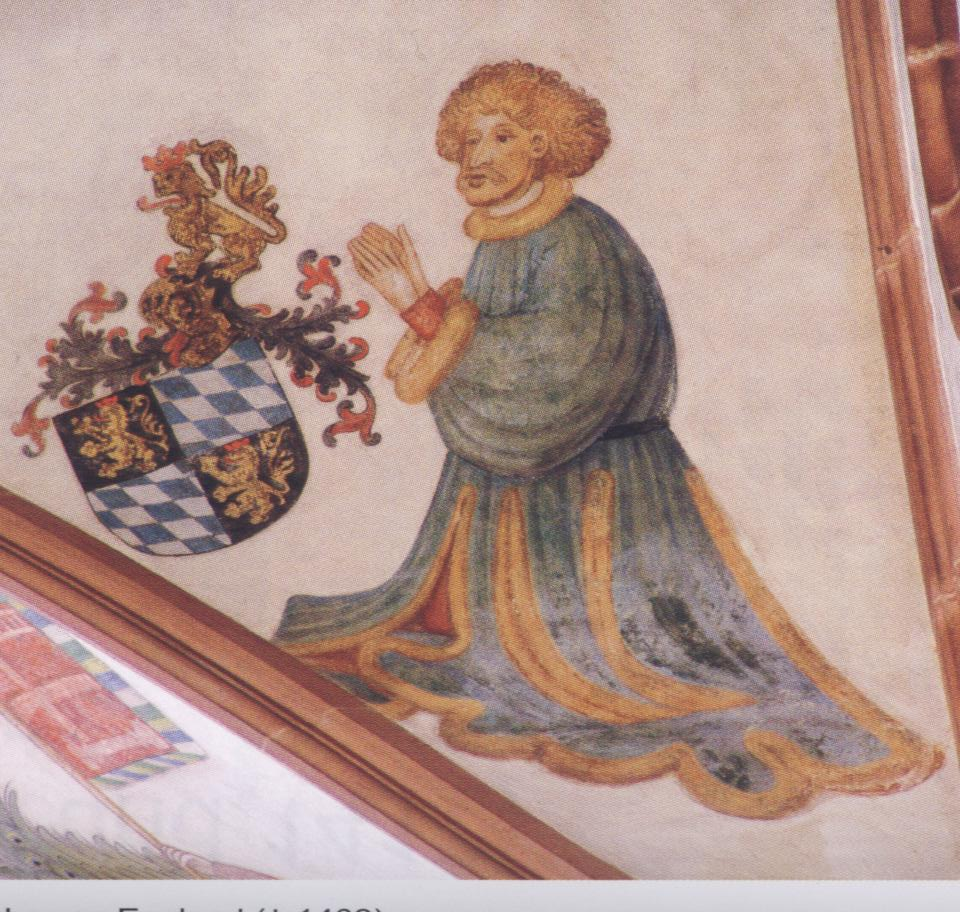
- Painting in the collegiate church of Neustadt an der Weinstraße

Elector Palatine
- Reign: 18 May 1410 – 30 December 1436
- Predecessor: Rupert III
- Successor: Louis IV
- Born: 23 January 1378
- Died: 30 December 1436 (aged 58); Heidelberg
- Spouse: Blanche of Lancaster; Matilda of Savoy
- Issue among others...: Mathilde; Louis IV, Elector Palatine; Frederick I, Elector Palatine; Ruprecht, archbishop of Cologne
- House: Wittelsbach
- Father: Rupert of Germany
- Mother: Elisabeth of Nuremberg

Louis III (German: Ludwig III. der Ältere or der Bärtige) (23 January 1378 – 30 December 1436), was an Elector Palatine of the Rhine from the house of Wittelsbach in 1410–1436.

== Biography ==
Louis III was the third son of King Rupert of Germany and his wife Elisabeth of Nuremberg. During his father's campaign in Italy 1401-1402 Louis served as imperial vicar. He succeeded his father in 1410 as Elector of the Palatinate but did not run for the German crown. The Palatinate was divided among the four of Rupert's surviving sons. As oldest surviving son and new Prince-Elector Louis III received the main part, John received Palatinate-Neumarkt, Stephen received Palatinate-Simmern and Otto received Palatinate-Mosbach.

Louis III was a member of the Parakeet Society and of the League of Constance. Highly cultured and religious he was a patron of the Heidelberg University. Louis III acted as vicar for Sigismund, Holy Roman Emperor and was his bearer during the Council of Constance. As such Louis later also executed the sentences against Jan Hus and Jerome of Prague. He also arrested Antipope John XXIII in 1415.

Louis III returned very sick from a pilgrimage in 1427 into the Holy Land which he had organized after the death of his son Ruprecht. From 1430 onwards he was almost blind and in 1435 deprived of power by his wife and her advisors. In the following year he died, in Heidelberg, and was succeeded by his son Louis IV.

== Family and children ==
Louis III was married twice.

Firstly, he married on 6 July 1402 Blanche of Lancaster (1392 – 22 May 1409), eldest daughter of King Henry IV of England and Mary de Bohun. This marriage brought the Palatine Crown into the hands of the Wittelsbach. They had one son:

1. Ruprecht (22 June 1406 – 20 May 1426).

Secondly, he married on 30 November 1417 Matilda of Savoy, daughter of Amadeo, Prince of Achaea. They had five children:

1. Mathilde (7 March 1419 – 1 October 1482), married:
  1. in 1434 to Count Louis I of Württemberg
  2. in 1452 to Duke Albrecht VI of Austria
2. Louis IV, Elector Palatine (1 January 1424 – 13 August 1449)
3. Frederick I, Elector Palatine (1 August 1425 – 12 December 1476)
4. Ruprecht (27 February 1427 – 26 July 1480), Prince-elector archbishop of Cologne
5. Margarete (ca. 1428 – 23 November 1466), a nun at Liebenau monastery

== Sources ==
- Harriss, Gerald (2005). Shaping the Nation: England 1360-1461. Oxford University Press.
- Ogden, Jack (2018). Diamonds: An Early History of the King of Gems. Yale University Press.
- Thomas, Andrew L. (2010). A House Divided: Wittelsbach Confessional Court Cultures in the Holy Roman Empire, c.1550-1650. Brill.
- Watanabe, Morimichi (2011). Christianson, Gerald; Izbicki, Thomas M. (eds.). Nicholas of Cusa: A Companion to His Life and His Times. Ashgate Publishing.

Louis III, Elector Palatine House of Wittelsbach Born: 1378 Died: 1436
Regnal titles
Preceded by Rupert III	Elector Palatine; 1410–1436	Succeeded by Louis IV
