= Frederick I, Elector Palatine =

Elector Palatine from 1449 to 1476

Frederick I
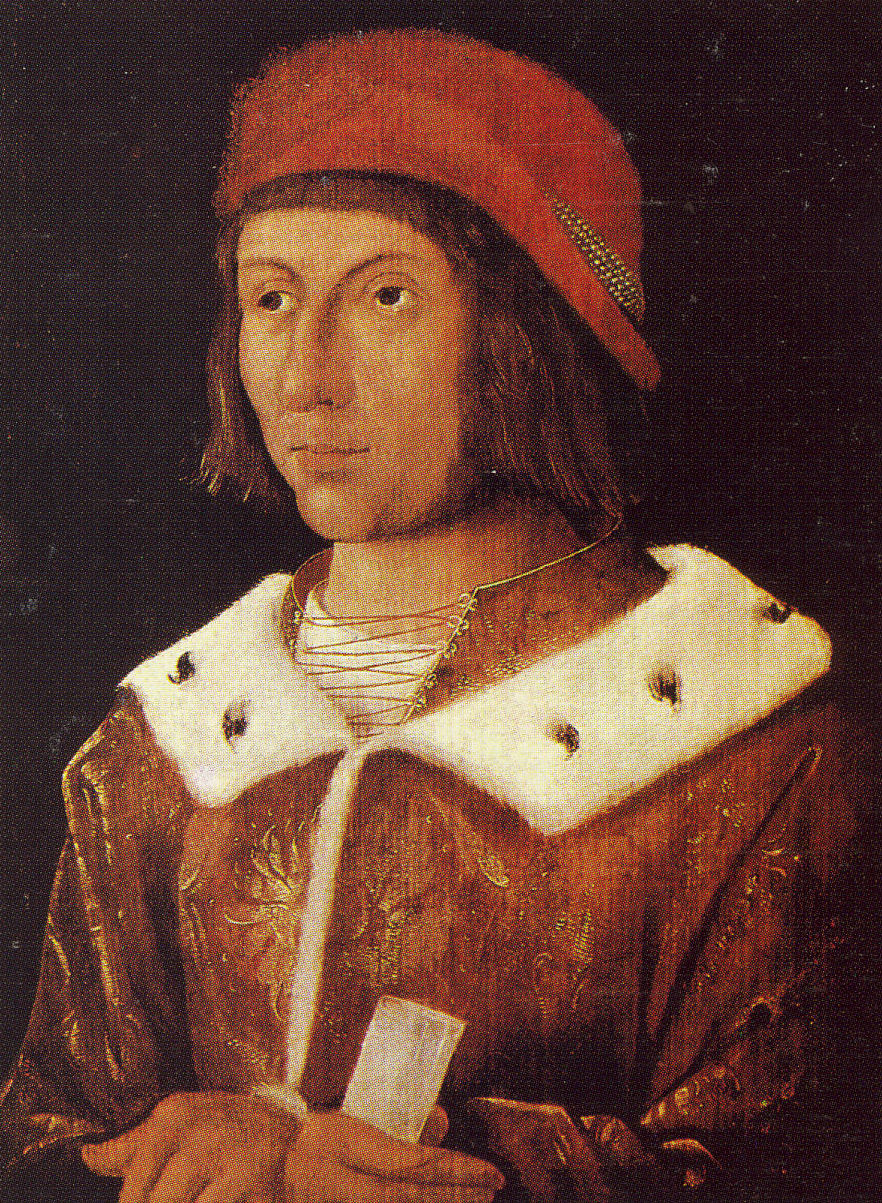

Elector Palatine
- Reign: 13 August 1449 – 12 December 1476
- Predecessor: Louis IV
- Successor: Philip
- Born: 1 August 1425; Heidelberg
- Died: 12 December 1476 (aged 51); Heidelberg
- Spouse: Clara Tott (m. 1471)
- Issue: Louis I, Count of Löwenstein
- House: Wittelsbach
- Father: Louis III, Elector Palatine
- Mother: Matilda of Savoy

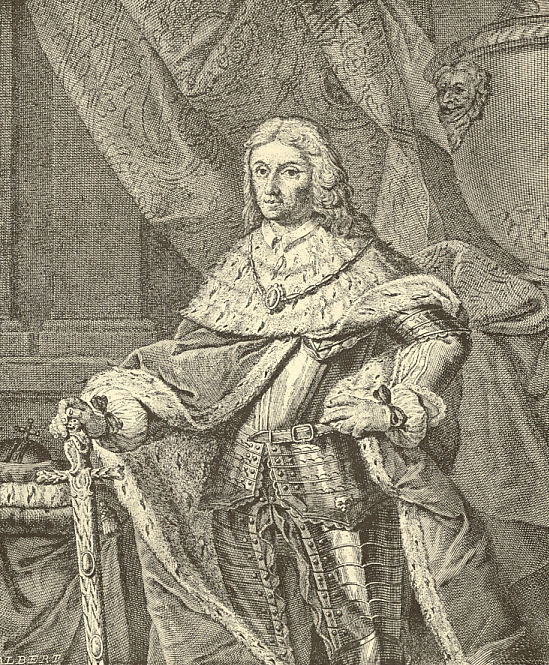
Frederick I the Victorious in a baroque engraving

Frederick I, the Victorious (der Siegreiche) (1 August 1425, Heidelberg – 12 December 1476, Heidelberg) was a Count Palatine of the Rhine and Elector Palatine from the House of Wittelsbach in 1451–1476.

== Biography ==
He was a son of Louis III, Elector Palatine and his second wife Matilda of Savoy. His maternal grandparents were Amadeus, Prince of Achaea and his wife Catherina of Geneva.

He ruled the Electoral Palatinate after the death of his brother Louis IV as regent for his nephew Philip, Elector Palatine. He adopted his nephew in 1451 and refused to marry. From this "Arrogation", he claimed the right to be the legitimate elector. As this action was against imperial law, Emperor Frederick III refused to confirm Frederick's status. However, the emperor did not manage to displace Frederick who was an able strategist and allied with Louis IX, Duke of Bavaria.

Frederick was also successful against other opponents such as the emperor's party follower Albrecht III Achilles, Elector of Brandenburg and Diether von Isenburg, the archbishop of Mainz, and increased his territory. With the Battle of Seckenheim during the Bavarian War (1459–1463) Frederick captured his antagonists Bishop George of Baden, Charles I, Margrave of Baden-Baden and Ulrich V, Count of Württemberg.

== Marriage and children ==
In 1471/1472, Frederick married his long-time mistress Clara Tott. She was a commoner and this was considered a morganatic marriage. They had two children:

- Friedrich von Wittelsbach (1461–1474).
- Louis I, Count of Löwenstein (29 September 1463 – 28 March 1523). Married first Elisabeth von Montfort and secondly Sophia Böcklin. Ancestor of the further rulers of Löwenstein.

Frederick I, Elector Palatine House of Wittelsbach Born: 1 August 1425 Died: 12 December 1476
Regnal titles
Preceded by Louis IV	Elector Palatine; 1451–1476	Succeeded by Philip
