= Ludwig I of Württemberg-Urach =

Count of Württemberg (died 1450)

Ludwig I
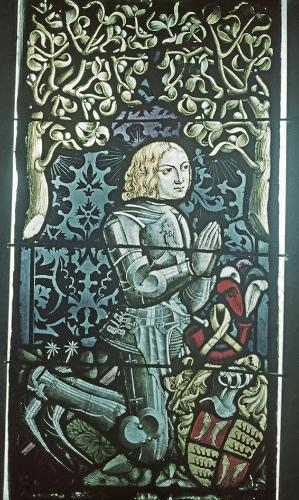
- Stained glass window in the Tübingen Collegiate Church depicting Ludwig as a praying knight, c. 1478.

Count of Württemberg
- Reign: 2 July 1419 – 25 January 1442
- Predecessor: Eberhard IV
- Successor: Treaty of Nürtingen
- Regent: Henriette of Mömpelgard (1419–1426)

Count of Württemberg-Urach
- Reign: 25 January 1442 – 23/24 September 1450
- Successor: Ludwig II
- Born: before 31 October 1412
- Died: 23/24 September 1450; Bad Urach, Württemberg
- Spouse: Mechthild of the Palatinate (m. 1436)
- Issue: 5, including Ludwig II and Eberhard V
- House: Württemberg
- Father: Eberhard IV
- Mother: Henriette of Mömpelgard

Ludwig I (before 31 October 1412 – 23/24 September 1450) was Count of Württemberg from 1419 and then count of Württemberg-Urach until his death in 1450.

== Life ==
Ludwig was born before 31 October 1412, the eldest son of Count Eberhard IV and his wife Henriette, Countess of Mömpelgard. Eberhard died unexpectedly of illness on 2 July 1419, while Ludwig and his younger brother Ulrich were both minors. Consequently, Henriette became their guardian, together with a regency council of 32 Württembergers.

After his coming of age, Ludwig reigned in Württemberg since 1426. He first reigned alone and later, starting in 1433, together with his brother Ulrich V. Ludwig was married to Mechthild of the Palatinate. The wedding was celebrated on 21 October 1436 in Stuttgart. After Ulrich's wedding with Margarethe von Cleve, the two brothers agreed on the partition of Württemberg. This was first limited to four years, but was made permanent by the Treaty of Nürtingen, signed on 25 January 1442.

Ludwig received the part of Urach with the territories in the south and the west of the county, including the territories in Alsace. After the death of Henriette of Montbéliard in 1444, Ludwig also obtained Montbéliard. Ludwig remodeled Urach into his residence and implemented an active policy to strengthen the monasteries in his realm of power.

He tried to align Württemberg more with the Wittelsbach and Habsburg dynasties. For example he supported duke Albert VI of Austria in his fight against the Old Swiss Confederacy.

Ludwig died of the plague on 23 or 24 September 1450 in Bad Urach.

== Children ==
Ludwig I and Mechthild of the Palatinate had the following children:

- Mechthild (aft 1436 – 6 June 1495), married since 1454 with Louis II, Landgrave of Hesse (1438–1471)
- Ludwig II (3 April 1439 – 3 November 1457), since 1450 Count of Württemberg-Urach
- Andreas (* 11.4 und † 19.5.1443)
- Eberhard V (11 December 1445 – 24 February 1496), since 1457 count of Württemberg-Urach, since 1495 Duke Eberhard I. of Württemberg
- Elisabeth (4 October 1447 – 3 June 1505), married since 1470 with Johann II of Nassau-Saarbrücken in Saarbrücken (1423–1472), and since 1474 with Heinrich dem Älteren, Count zu Stolberg (1436–1511)

== Ancestors ==
Ancestors of Ludwig I of Württemberg-Urach

8. Ulrich, Count of Württemberg
4. Eberhard III, Count of Württemberg
9. Elizabeth of Bavaria, Countess of Württemberg
2. Eberhard IV, Count of Württemberg
10. Bernabò Visconti
5. Antonia Visconti
11. Beatrice Regina della Scala
1. Ludwig I, Count of Württemberg-Urach
12. Stephen of Montfaucon
6. Henry of Orbe
13. Margaret of Chalon-Arlay
3. Henriette, Countess of Montbéliard
14. Gaucher X de Chatillon, Viscount of Blaigny
7. Marie de Chatillon, Vicountess of Blaigny
15. Jeanne de Coucy

== See also ==
- History of Baden-Württemberg

Ludwig I of Württemberg-Urach House of Württemberg Born: before 31 October 1412 Died: 23/24 September 1450
German nobility
Preceded by Eberhard IV	Count of Württemberg; 1419–1442 with Ulrich V	Vacant Treaty of Nürtingen Title next held by Eberhard V
New creation	Count of Württemberg-Urach; 1442–1450	Succeeded by Ludwig II
Preceded by Henriette of Mömpelgard	Count of Mömpelgard; 1444–1450 with Ulrich V (1444–1446)	Succeeded by Ludwig II
