= Eberhard IV of Württemberg =

Count of Württemberg (1388–1419)

Eberhard IV
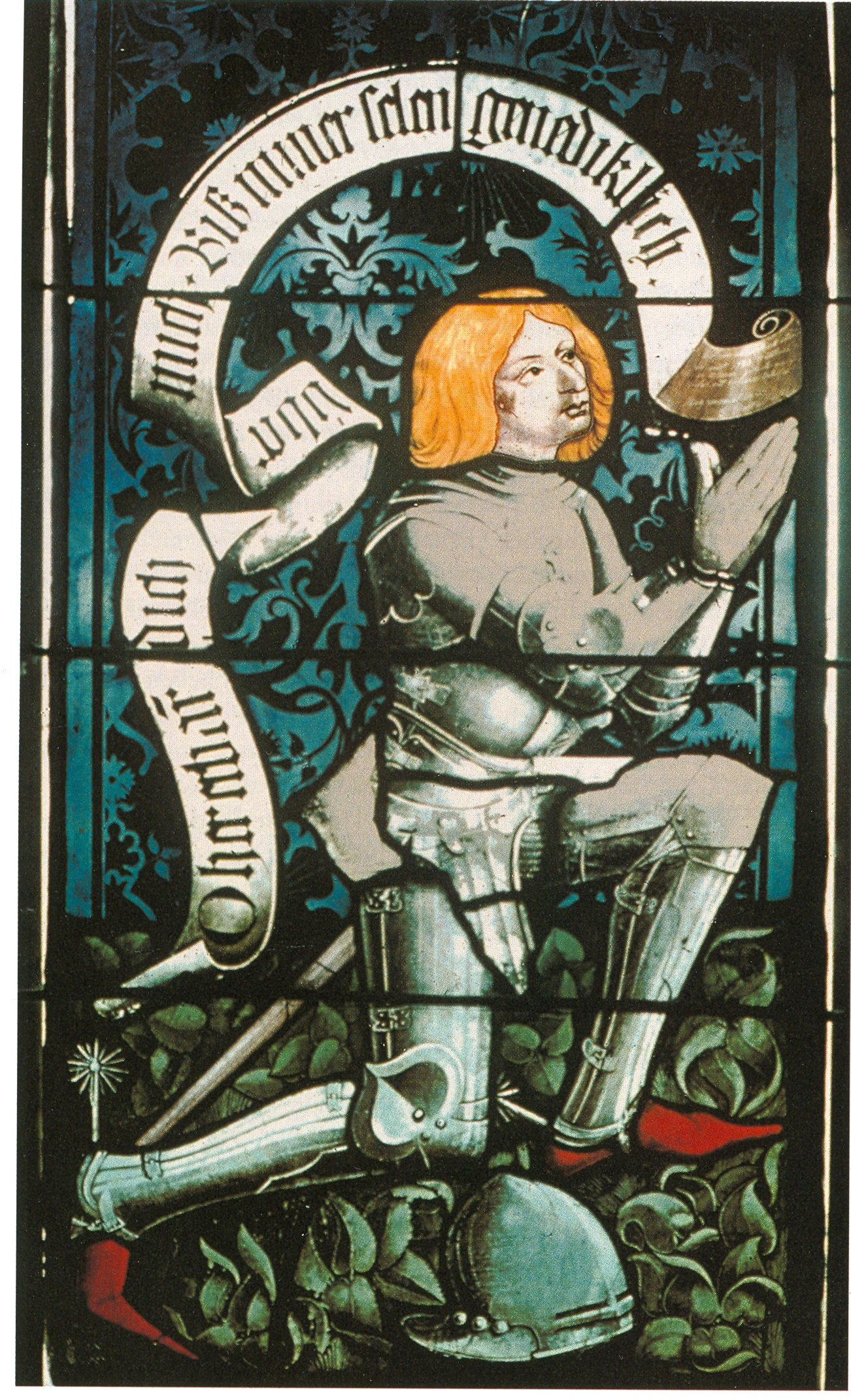
- Stained glass window in the Tübingen Collegiate Church depicting Eberhard as a praying knight, c. 1477–1478.

Count of Württemberg
- Reign: 16 May 1417 – 2 July 1419
- Predecessor: Eberhard III
- Successor: Ludwig I and Ulrich V
- Born: c. 1388
- Died: 2 July 1419 (aged 30–31); Waiblingen, Württemberg
- Burial: Stiftskirche, Stuttgart
- Spouse: Henriette of Montbéliard
- Issue: Anna; Ludwig I; Ulrich V
- House: Württemberg
- Father: Eberhard III
- Mother: Antonia Visconti

Eberhard IV (c. 1388 – 2 July 1419), called the Younger (German: der Jüngere), was Count of Württemberg from 1417 until his death in 1419.

== Life ==
Eberhard was born around 1388, the only surviving child of Count Eberhard III and his first wife Antonia Visconti, daughter of Bernabò Visconti. On 13 November 1397 he became engaged to Henriette of Mömpelgard. Henriette was the oldest daughter and main heiress of Henry of Mömpelgard, who died in 1396 one year before his father, Count Stephan of Mömpelgard. Their marriage, which occurred in 1407 at the latest, caused the county of Mömpelgard to become part of Württemberg. Eberhard IV also had a child with Agnes von Dagersheim, (Elisabeth von Dagersheim X Conrad Lyher).

Eberhard took active part in management of the state from 1407. Starting 1409 he governed the county of Mömpelgard together with Henriette. After the death of Eberhard III on 16 May 1417, he became the ruler of all of Württemberg. At the time of his death on 2 July 1419, Eberhard's two sons, Ludwig, who would later become Count Ludwig I, and Ulrich, later Count Ulrich V, were only seven and six years old, respectively. A guardianship government of Henriette and up to 32 Württembergian councilors was instituted.

== Family and children ==
Eberhard was married to Henriette, Countess of Montbéliard and they had:

1. Anna of Württemberg (1408–1471), married Philip I, Count of Katzenelnbogen
2. Ludwig I of Württemberg (1412 – 24 September 1450, Urach).
3. Ulrich V of Württemberg (1413 – 1 September 1480, Leonberg).

== Ancestors ==
Ancestors of Eberhard IV of Württemberg

8. Eberhard II, Count of Württemberg
4. Ulrich, Count of Württemberg
9. Elizabeth von Henneberg-Schleusingen
2. Eberhard III, Count of Württemberg
10. Louis IV, Holy Roman Emperor
5. Elizabeth of Bavaria, Countess of Württemberg
11. Margaret II, Countess of Hainaut
1. Eberhard IV, Count of Württemberg
12. Stefano Visconti
6. Bernabò Visconti
13. Valentina Doria
3. Antonia Visconti
14. Mastino II della Scala
7. Beatrice Regina della Scala
15. Taddea da Carrara

Eberhard IV of Württemberg House of Württemberg Born: c. 1388 Died: 2 July 1419
German nobility
Preceded by Eberhard III	Count of Mömpelgard; 1409–1419	Succeeded by Henriette of Mömpelgard
Preceded by Eberhard III	Count of Württemberg; 1417–1419	Succeeded by Ludwig I and Ulrich V
