= Louis IV, Elector Palatine =

Elector Palatine from 1436 to 1449

Louis IV
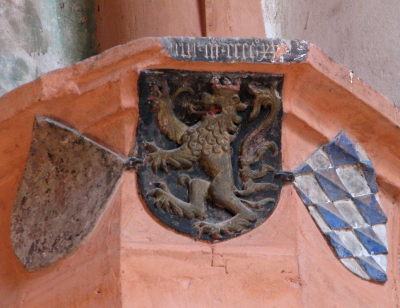
- Coat of arms

Elector Palatine
- Reign: 30 December 1436 – 13 August 1449
- Predecessor: Louis III
- Successor: Frederick I
- Born: 1 January 1424; Heidelberg
- Died: 13 August 1449 (aged 25); Worms
- Burial: Church of the Holy Spirit in Heidelberg
- Spouse: Margarete of Savoy
- Issue: Philip, Elector Palatine
- House: Wittelsbach
- Father: Louis III, Elector Palatine
- Mother: Matilda of Savoy

Louis IV, Count Palatine of the Rhine (1 January 1424, Heidelberg – 13 August 1449, Worms) was an Elector Palatine of the Rhine from the House of Wittelsbach in 1436 - 1449.

== Biography ==
Louis IV was the son of Louis III, Elector Palatine and his second wife Matilda of Savoy. His mother was a fourth-generation descendant of Thomas III of Piedmont (1248 - 1282), the eldest son of Thomas II of Savoy.

From the death of Louis III in 1436 until 1442, Louis IV ruled under the guardianship of his uncle, Count Palatine Otto I of Mosbach. In 1444 he repelled the attacks of the Armagnacs as an Imperial captain. Louis IV died aged 25 years in 1449 in Worms, and was buried in the Church of the Holy Spirit of Heidelberg. His only son being a minor, Philipp, he fell under the guardianship of Louis' brother Frederick, who later adopted him and then seized the electoral title himself in 1451/52.

== Marriage and children ==
In 1445, he married Margarete of Savoy, widow of king Louis III of Naples and daughter of Duke Amadeus VIII of Savoy. With her, he had his only son:

1. Philipp (14 July 1448 – 28 February 1508), Elector Palatine from 1476 to 1508.

Louis IV, Elector Palatine House of Wittelsbach Born: 1424 Died: 1449
German royalty
Regnal titles
Preceded by Louis III	Elector Palatine; 1436–1449	Succeeded by Frederick I
