= Heidelberg University Library =

Academic library in Germany

- Universitätsbibliothek Heidelberg

- The main building, built in 1905
- Location: Heidelberg
- Established: 1386
- Branches: 1 (Neuenheimer Feld)

Collection
- Size: 3.2 million books

Access and use
- Circulation: 750,000 books
- Population served: general public
- Members: 43,000

Other information
- Director: Jochen Apel
- Employees: 179
- Website: www.ub.uni-heidelberg.de
- References: "Heidelberg University Library: The library system of the University of Heidelberg in numbers". UB Heidelberg. 17 November 2022.; "Heidelberg University Library: Locations and Addresses of Heidelberg University Library". UB Heidelberg. 8 February 2019.

Heidelberg University Library
Library locations
1 Plöck, Main
2 Neuenheimer Feld, Branch

The Heidelberg University Library (German: Universitätsbibliothek Heidelberg, ISIL DE-16) is the central library of the Heidelberg University. Together with the 83 decentralized libraries of the faculties and institutes, it forms the University Library System, which is headed by the director of the University Library. The University Library holds special collections in literature concerning the Palatinate and Baden, egyptology, archeology, the history of art, and South Asia. It holds about 3.2 million books, 6,000 printed scientific periodicals, and about 500,000 other media such as microfilms and video tapes. The libraries of the faculties and institutes hold another 3 million printed books. In 2022, the University Library registered 43,600 active users who accessed more than 746,000 books. The conventional book supply is complemented by numerous electronic services, including approximately 152,00 electronic journals. The University Library provides around 1,100 reading- and workspaces in the main library in the old town and around 320 reading- and workspaces in the branch in the Neuenheimer Feld, including many IT-workstations and research stations equipped with PCs.

== History ==
The historical reading room fell victim to a 'modernization' in 1954.

Heidelberg University Library is the oldest university library in Germany. Its origin coincides with the founding year of the University of Heidelberg in 1386. Its roots trace back to the purchase of a chest of documents by the first Rector Marsilius von Inghen in 1388, which was stored in the Heiliggeistkirche. The library was initially built up through book donations from bishops, chancellors, and early professors. Louis III willed his large and valuable collection to the university, as did the Fugger of Augsburg. Otto Henry, Elector Palatine, combined the university's libraries in the 16th century, thus creating the Bibliotheca Palatina. After Heidelberg was conquered by Tilly in September 1622 during the Thirty Years War, the victorious Maximilian I, Elector of Bavaria donated the Bibliotheca Palatina to Pope Gregory XV. More than 3,700 manuscripts and approx. 13,000 pamphlets were brought to the Vatican in Rome. Several manuscripts dating from the 10th to 18th century from the libraries of the secularized monasteries Salem and Petershausen constituted the basis for the reconstruction. Efforts to recover the Bibliotheca Palatina led to a partial success in 1816: 847 German manuscripts from the Vatican and some Latin and Greek works came back from Paris to Heidelberg. In 1888 the Codex Manesse, which was at that point located in the Royal Library in Paris, returned to Heidelberg as part of an exchange.

== The main building ==
From 1901 to 1905, a richly ornamented four-wing red sandstone building was constructed for the library across from the Church of St. Peter. It was designed by Josef Durm, who adapted the Renaissance style of Heidelberg Castle and added numerous elements of Art Nouveau. These include a depiction of Prometheus with the eagle to the left of the main entrance and a veiled Virgin to the right. The central gable of the main facade is decorated with a sculpture of the head sculpture of Pallas Athene, on the gable of the west facade there is a depiction of the Weltgeist, over whose head are arranged foliage, a globe, and nine stars. The frontage is punctuated by numerous windows for the sake of natural illumination. In May 1971 the building was designated a historic monument.

== New builds, extensions and refurbishments ==
Since 1978, the science branch of the University Library serves the institutes of natural sciences and medicine on the New Campus. It was expanded in the 1990s. In 1988, the main library in the old town was partially renovated. In 1991, the underground archive forcapable of holding about 2 million books was completed under the courtyard of the New University. The construction project for the north extension of the University Library in the adjacent building complex, the so-called Triplex building, started in 2009. The construction work was completed in April 2015. The new Triplex reading room was opened in July 2015. From 2016 to 2019, the Enquiry and Reference Services in the old town (IZA) and the Multimedia Centre (MMZ) were renovated.

== Senior librarians (since 1912) or directors ==
- Friedrich Wilken (1808–1817)
- Friedrich Christoph Schlosser (1817–1825)
- Franz Mone (1825–1827)
- Joseph Eiselein (1827–1833)
- Johann Christian Felix Bähr 1833–1872
- Karl Zangemeister (1873–1902)
- Jakob Wille (1902–1922)
- Rudolf Sillib (1922–1934)
- Hermann Finke (1934–1935, Kommissarische Leitung)
- Karl Preisendanz (1935–1945)
- Hermann Finke (1945–1947, Kommissarische Leitung)
- Joseph Deutsch (1947–1952)
- Walter Bauhuis (1952–1953, kommissarische Leitung)
- Carl Wehmer (1953–1965)
- Walter Koschorreck (1965–1978)
- Walter Henß (1977–1979, Kommissarische Leitung)
- Elmar Mittler (1979–1990)
- Wilfried Werner (1990–1991, Kommissarische Leitung)
- Hermann Josef Dörpinghaus (1991–2001)
- Gisela Weber (2001–2002, Kommissarische Leitung)
- Veit Probst (2002–2023)
- Jochen Apel (since 2023)

== Manuscripts, Old Prints and Rare Books ==
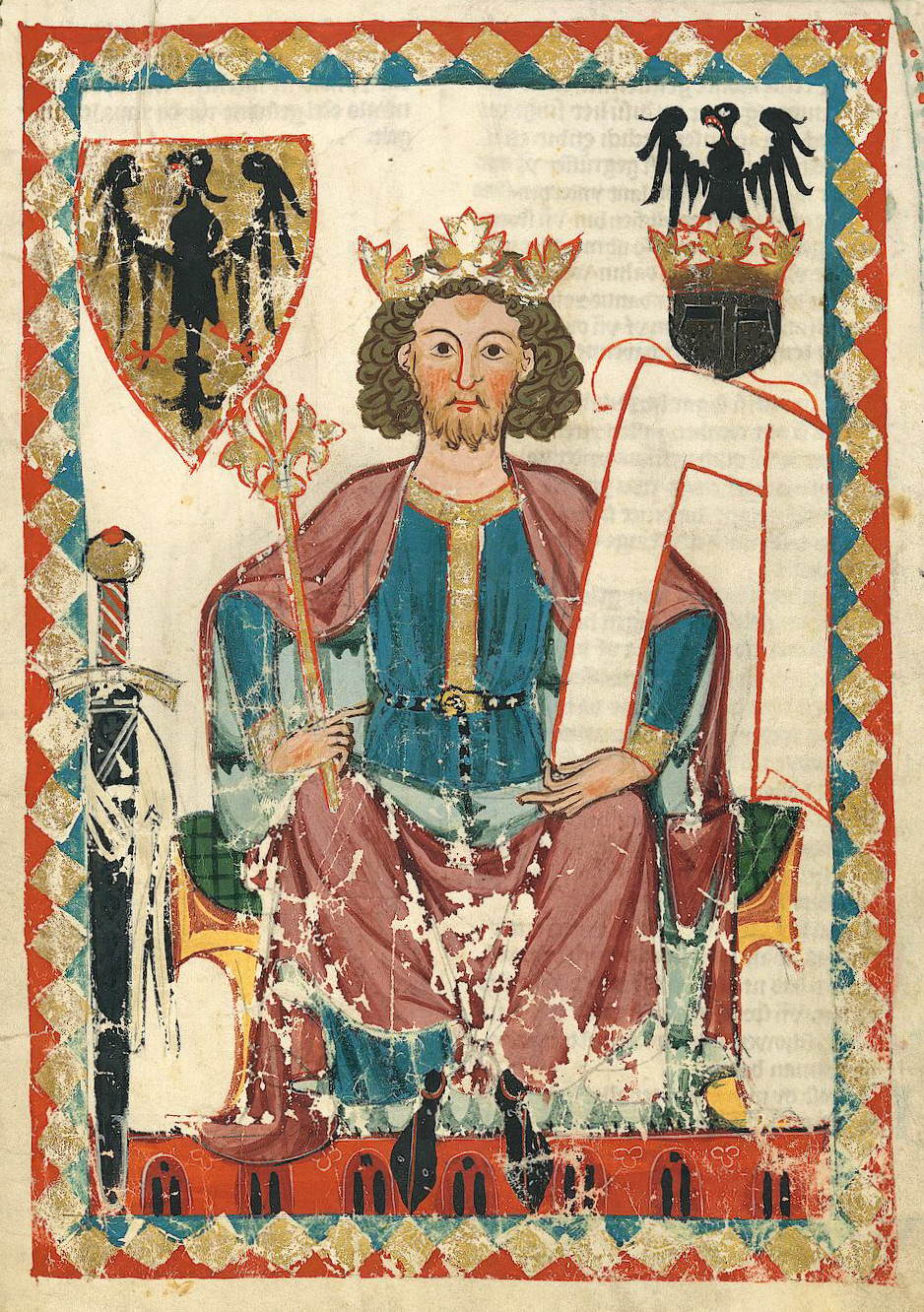
Portrait of Henry VI from Codex Manesse, c. 1304

The Heidelberg University Library has a collection with 6,900 manuscripts, 1,800 incunabula, 110,600 autographs and a collection of old maps, graphic sheets, drawings and photographs. The origins of the Bibliotheca Palatina with manuscripts from the 9th to the 17th century go back to the founding year of the university in 1386. Among the manuscripts, the Codex Manesse (Cod. Pal. germ. 848) stands out. The Große Heidelberger Liederhandschrift was written in Zurich between 1300 and 1340 and is the most extensive collection of Middle High German poetry. The codex contains almost 6,000 stanzas by 140 poets on 426 sheets of parchment. Its 137 miniatures are a series of "portraits" depicting each poet. Also part of the stock are the predominantly Latin manuscripts dating from the 10th to 18th century from the monastic libraries Salem and Petershausen, the so-called Heidelberger Handschriften (mainly modern manuscripts and a large number of autographs and estates), manuscripts from the estate of the London bookseller Nikolaus Trübner (Trübner Collection) as well as documents, incunabula and old prints. The graphic collection contains landscapes and portraits rendered in different techniques. It comprises drawings, woodcuts, copper and steel engravings, etchings, and photographs. The graphic collection contains views and portraits in drawings, woodcuts, copper and steel engravings, etchings and photographs. Contents of the special collections are registered in separate catalogues, and provided detailed descriptions.The special collections are available through detailed descriptions in special catalogues. In addition, many manuscripts, incunabula and rara are available online in digitized form.

== Electronic library and publication services ==
The electronic library includes over 152,000 full-text e-journals, 3,800 databases and around 850,000 e-books. A large part of the 6.2 million media in the library system is registered in the online catalog HEIDI. The Heidelberg University Library conducts a digitization center. Parts of the historical inventory are digitized using specially made book tables (Grazer Buchtisch). All manuscripts of the Bibliotheca Palatina are available online as digital copies on the Internet (848 German-language Palatina manuscripts, 2,030 Latin, 423 Greek, 267 Hebrew and 20 manuscripts in other languages). The digitization of the German and Latin codices of the Bibliotheca Palatina was funded by the Manfred Lautenschläger Foundation. The Heidelberg University Library and the Vatican Library collaborated on the digitization. A sub-project was the virtual reconstruction of the Lorsch monastic library. The Heidelberg document server heiDOK is an open access platform that offers members of the university the opportunity to publish on the web free of charge. The multimedia archive, which is based on the EPrints system, is DINI-certified. On the basis of the Open Journal Systems software, it is also possible to create and manage e-journals. With heidICON, the university library provides a central object and multimedia database for the University of Heidelberg. The university bibliography heiBIB lists all academic publications by members of Heidelberg University. In 2015, the University of Heidelberg founded the publishing house Heidelberg University Publishing – heiUP, which is part of the university library. The publisher releases quality-controlled scientific publications in open access.

== Specialized information services ==
Within the framework of the cooperative system of national literature and information supply funded by the German Research Foundation (DFG), the Heidelberg University Library oversees the specialized information services (FID) for Egyptology, Classical Archaeology, European Art History up to 1945 and General Fine Arts Studies as well as South Asian Studies. The library is tasked with collecting the German and foreign scientific literature for these departments as exhaustively completely as possible, indexing it and making it available via interlibrary loan. The goal of the DFG-funded specialized information services is the recording of scientific information without media discontinuity – and, if possible, ensuring that direct access is provided. One element is the meta-search via specialized catalogs and databases. The specialized information guides make technically relevant, and high-quality internet sources accessible. Historical collections are gradually being digitized and offered freely via the specialized portals.

== Gallery ==
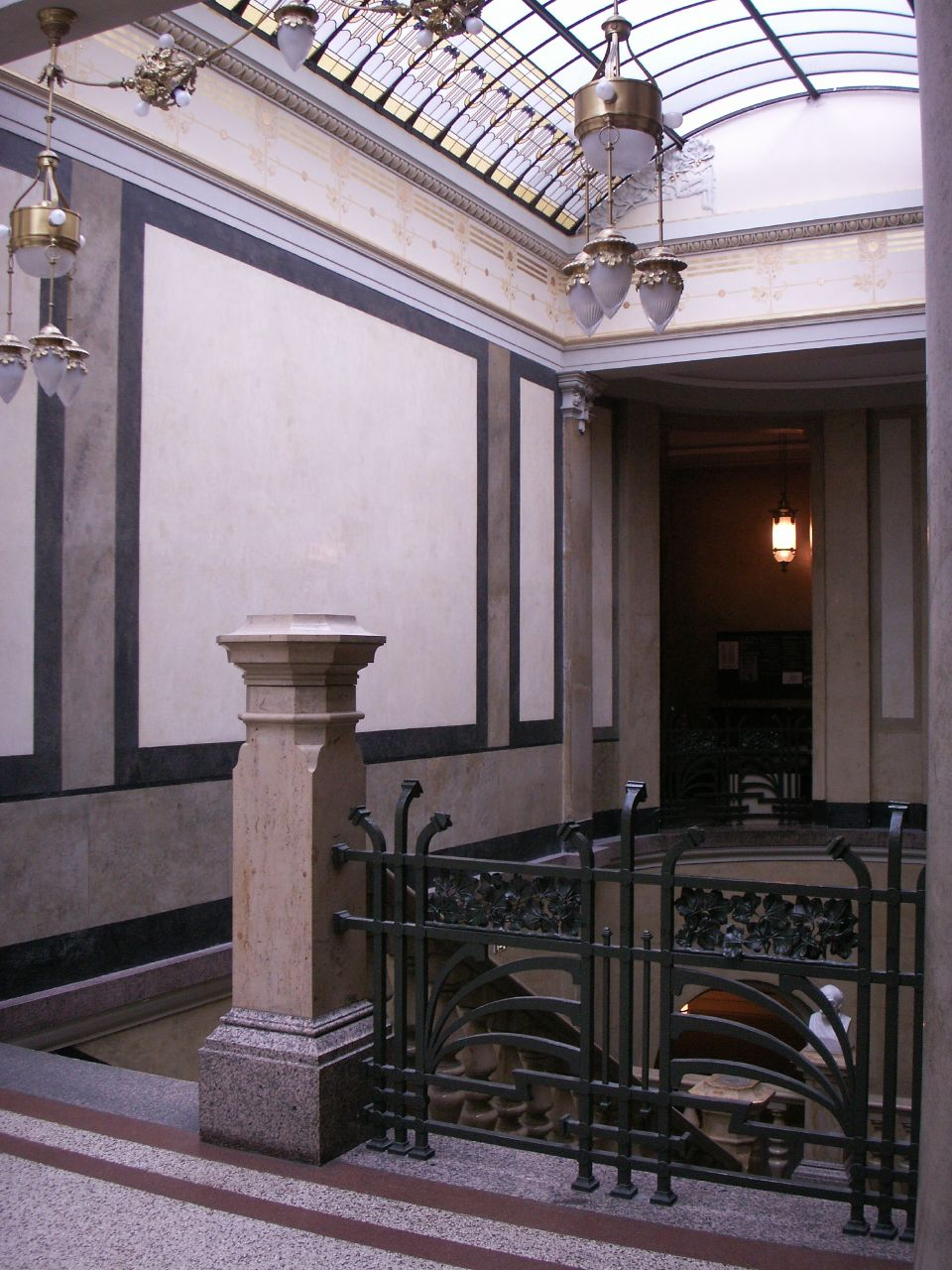
Main building staircase

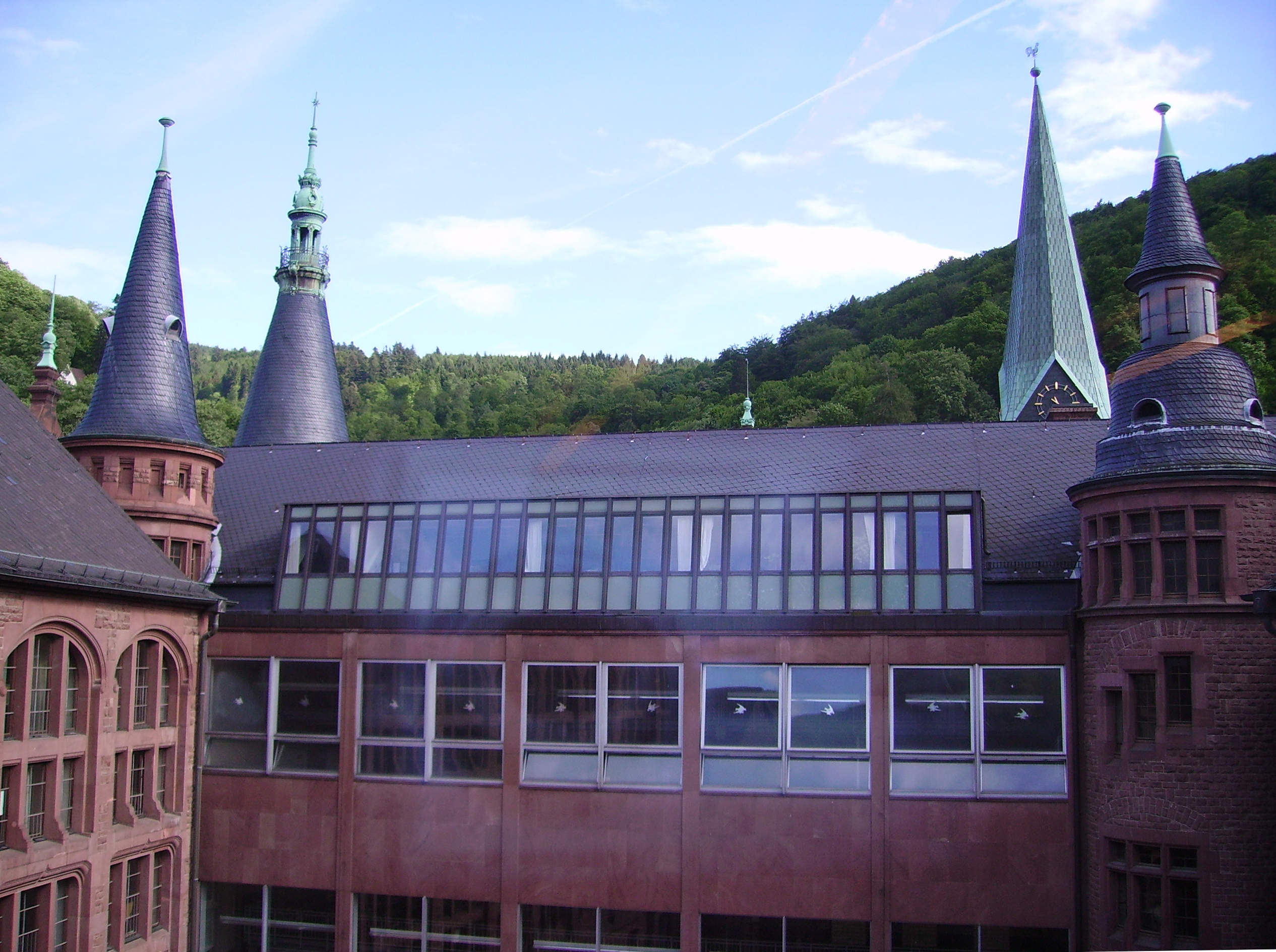
Main building roof

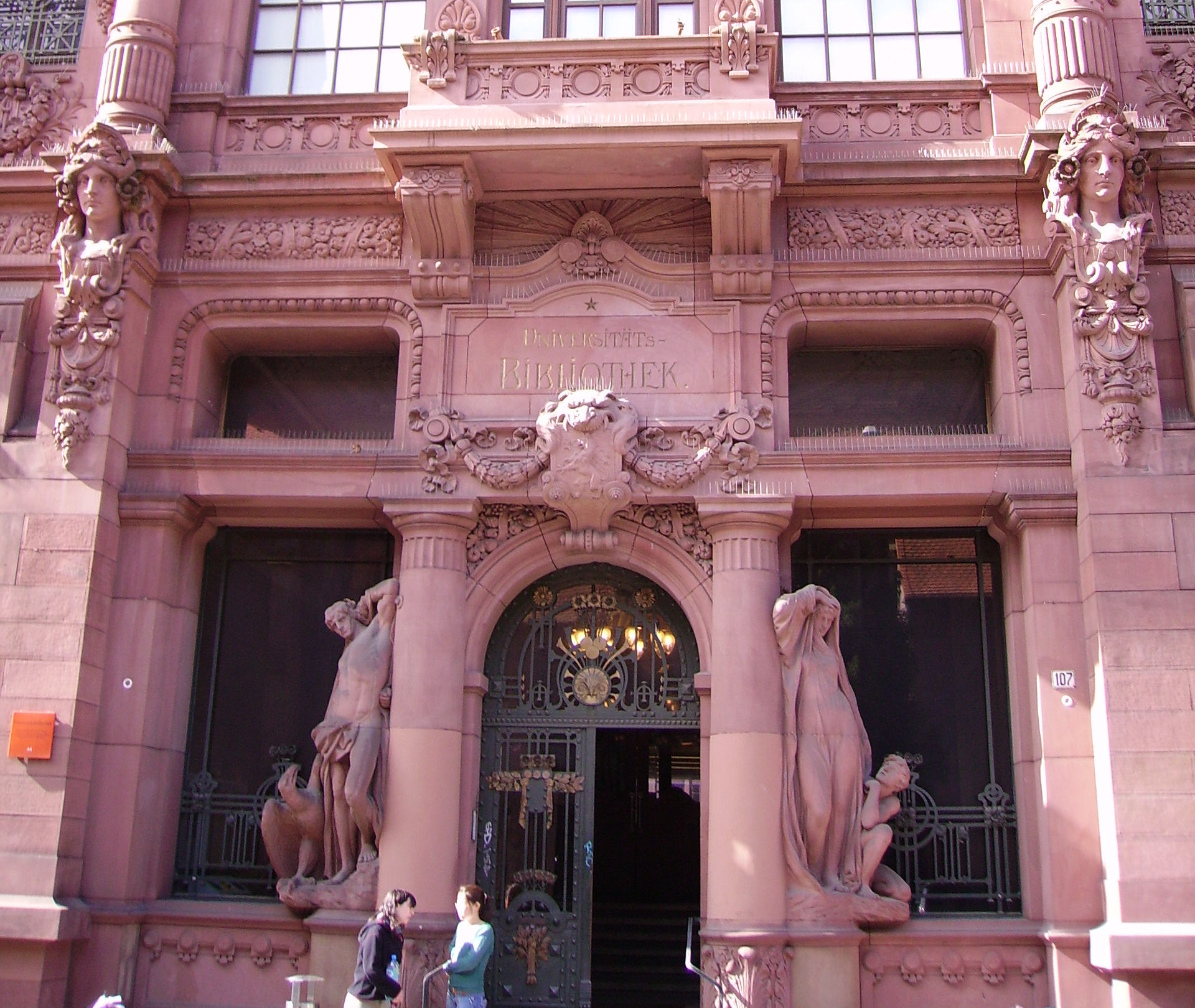
Main building entrance

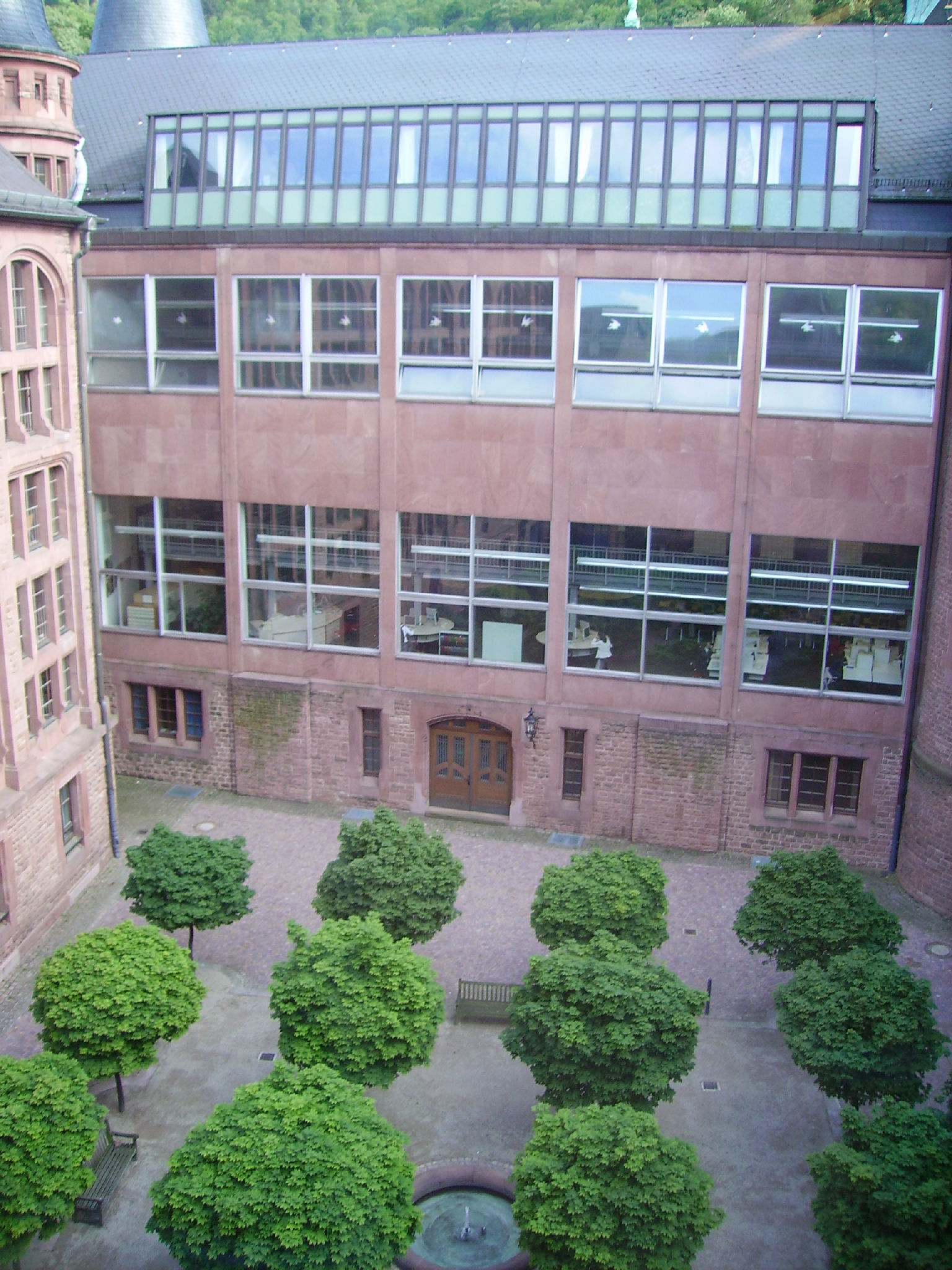
Main building courtyard

== See also ==
- Bibliotheca Palatina
- Codex Manesse
