= Johann Bahr =

Johann Bahr, Bähr, or Baehr may refer to either of

- Johann Christian Felix Baehr, a German scholar
- Johann Beer, an Austrian composer and official
