= Johannes Schreiter =

German architectural artist and printmaker

- Born: 8 March 1930 (age 96); Buchholz, Erzgebirgskreis, Germany
- Known for: Printmaking, painting, stained glass, Brandcollage
- Notable work: Chapel of the Brotherhood of St. Johannes, Leutesdorf; Église Notre-Dame de Douai; Heiliggeistkirche, Heidelberg; Ulm Minster; Whitechapel Medical Library
- Television: Der Glasmaler

Johannes Schreiter (born 8 March 1930) is a German graphic artist, printmaker, designer of stained glass, theoretician and cultural critic. Born in Buchholz in 1930, Schreiter studied in Münster, Mainz, and Berlin, before receiving a scholarship from Friedrich-Ebert-Stiftung in 1958. His invention of the Brandcollage in 1959 first brought him to broader cultural attention, and in 1963 he became professor of Painting and Graphic Art at the Frankfurt/Main School of Decorative Arts, and in 1971 Rector of the same. He was awarded the Bundesverdienstkreuz (National Cross of Merit), the highest civilian honour granted by West Germany, in 1979.

Schreiter demonstrated a keen interest in stained glass early on during his studies in Meinz, where he graduated in 1955 with a graduation paper titled “Die Wiederentdeckung der Glasmalerei im 20. Jahrhundert und ihre formalen und geistigen Voraussetzungen" ("The rediscovery of stained glass in the 20th century and its formal and intellectual prerequisites"). Part of the influential Post-War German school of stained glass, Schreiter's work is characterised by the exploitation of lead as a graphic rather than solely structural element; the use of translucent, unpainted glass; and by a highly-developed and personal language of symbols. Regarded as occupying a position of pre-eminence in the stained glass of the 20th century, works by Schreiter can be found in historical and contemporary buildings, museums, and public and private art collections worldwide. For example, in the Church St. Margareta in Bürgstadt, in the Church of St. Johannes in Kitzingen, and in the Church of St. Mary in Dortmund.

== The 'Heidelberger Fensterstreit' ==
In 1977, Schreiter was commissioned to design a series of stained glass windows for the medieval Church of the Holy Spirit, Heidelberg, whose board had voted to replace 19th century temporary glazing and other additions to the building, one of the most significant Gothic churches in Germany, as part of a broader restoration and repair of the interior. Between 1977 and 1984, Schreiter designed a programme of artworks, twenty-two windows, for the Church, whose intention was to reinstall stained glass throughout in a unified programme of glazing by a single artist: the commission was what would have the largest stained glass commission granted to a single artist at that time. Considered one of the most significant works of stained glass of the 20th century, Schreiter's avant-garde designs incorporated references from science, medicine, philosophy, and the analogue technologies of the day in reference to Heiliggeistkirche's history as former home of the Biblioteca Palatina. Cited as the first time in contemporary stained glass design "that maps, graphs, newspaper and television images were used as source material", the windows were the subject of a dispute, cited as "the most intense controversy on record involving twentieth century stained glass". This major cultural and theological dispute, known as the 'Heidelberg Controversy', was concluded in 1986. In 1984, Schreiter's designs, previously argued out and tested within a working group including theologians, art critics and church attendees, were presented to the public, and the first of the designs was fabricated and installed in the Church: a window known as the "Physikfenster", marking the use of nuclear weapons at Hiroshima. The rector of Heidelberg University 'forbade the use' of these designs and, nine years after embarking on the programme, the project was terminated on June 23, 1986, with only one of the suite of twenty-two windows fabricated and installed. Several individual windows from the cycle have since been produced under Schreiter's direction and based on the original designs, for other organisations, including museums, hospital clinics, and other churches.

== Selected publications ==
- Hans Hofstätter: Johannes Schreiter: Neue Glasbilder und eine Einführung in die neue Glasbildkunst. München: Moos, 1965.
- Birgit Schwarz: Johannes Schreiter: Das Glasbildernische Werk 1959-1980. Hessisches Landesmuseum Darmstadt, 1987. ISBN 3-926527-08-0
- Luzia Schlösser: Licht Zeichen: Die Kunst von Johannes Schreiter. Deutsches Glasmalerei-Museum Linnich, 2019. ISBN 978-3-946278-02-3
- Johannes Schreiter: Wortfenster. Schnell & Steiner, Regensburg 2008, ISBN 978-3-7954-2066-6.
- Yvonne Besser: Religiöse Bildsprache der nichtfigurativen Moderne: der Fensterzyklus zu Psalm 22 von Johannes Schreiter in der Jacobikirche Göttingen. Verlag Otto Lembeck, 2009.
- Gunther Sehring, Holger Brülls: Johannes Schreiter: Glasbilder – Collagen – Zeichnungen 1995–2012. Kunstverlag Josef Fink, Lindenberg 2012, ISBN 978-3-89870-687-2.
- Birgit Schwarz: Johannes Schreiter. Das glasbildnerische Werk von 1959 bis 1980. Hessisches Landesmuseum, Darmstadt, 1987.
- Helmut Schwier: Der Fensterzyklus von Johannes Schreiter in der Peterskirche Heidelberg (Schnell Kunstführer Nr. 2826). Schnell & Steiner, Regensburg 2013, ISBN 978-3-7954-6955-9.

== Gallery ==
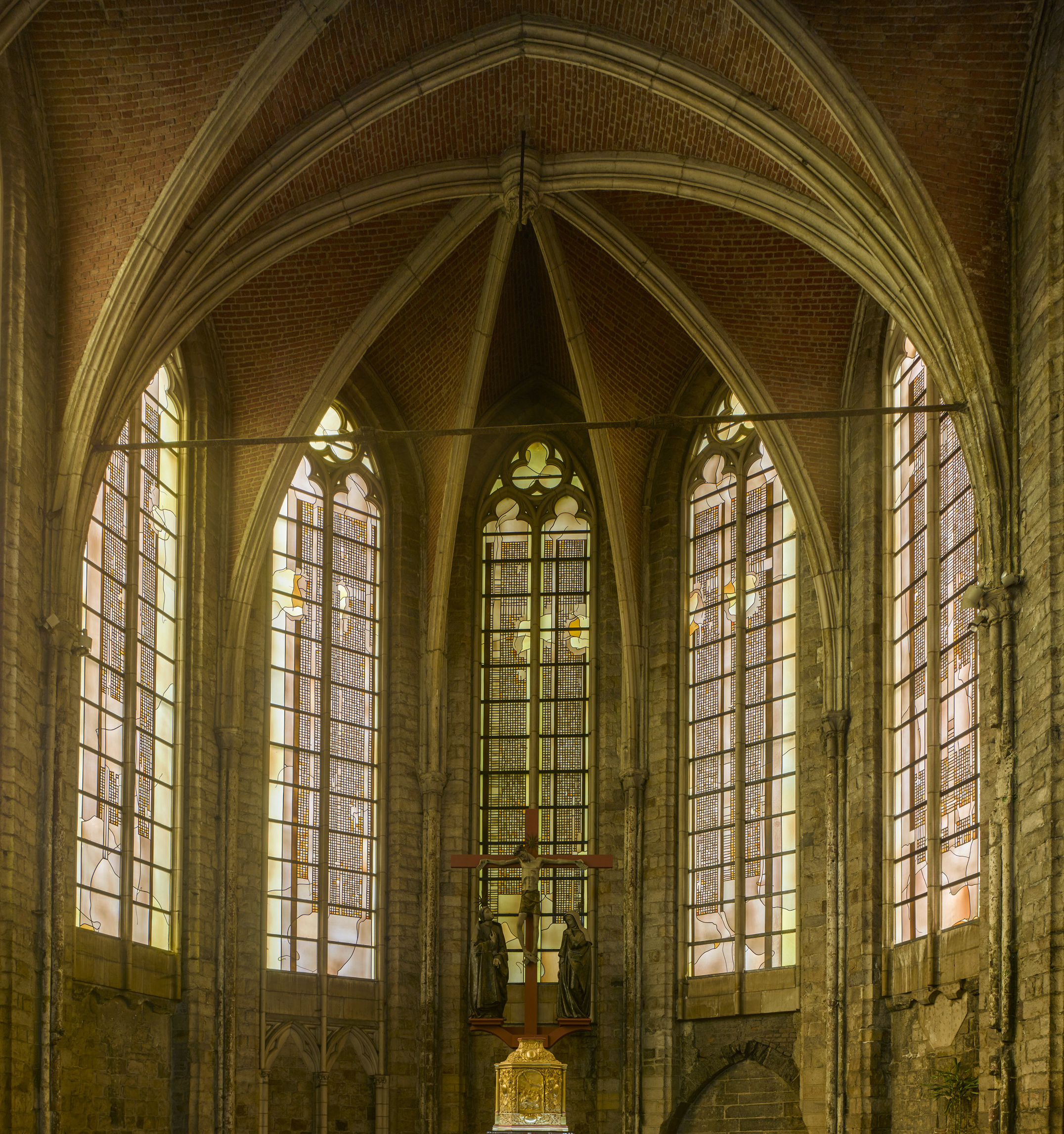
Suite of stained glass windows designed for Église Notre-Dame de Douai, 1976.

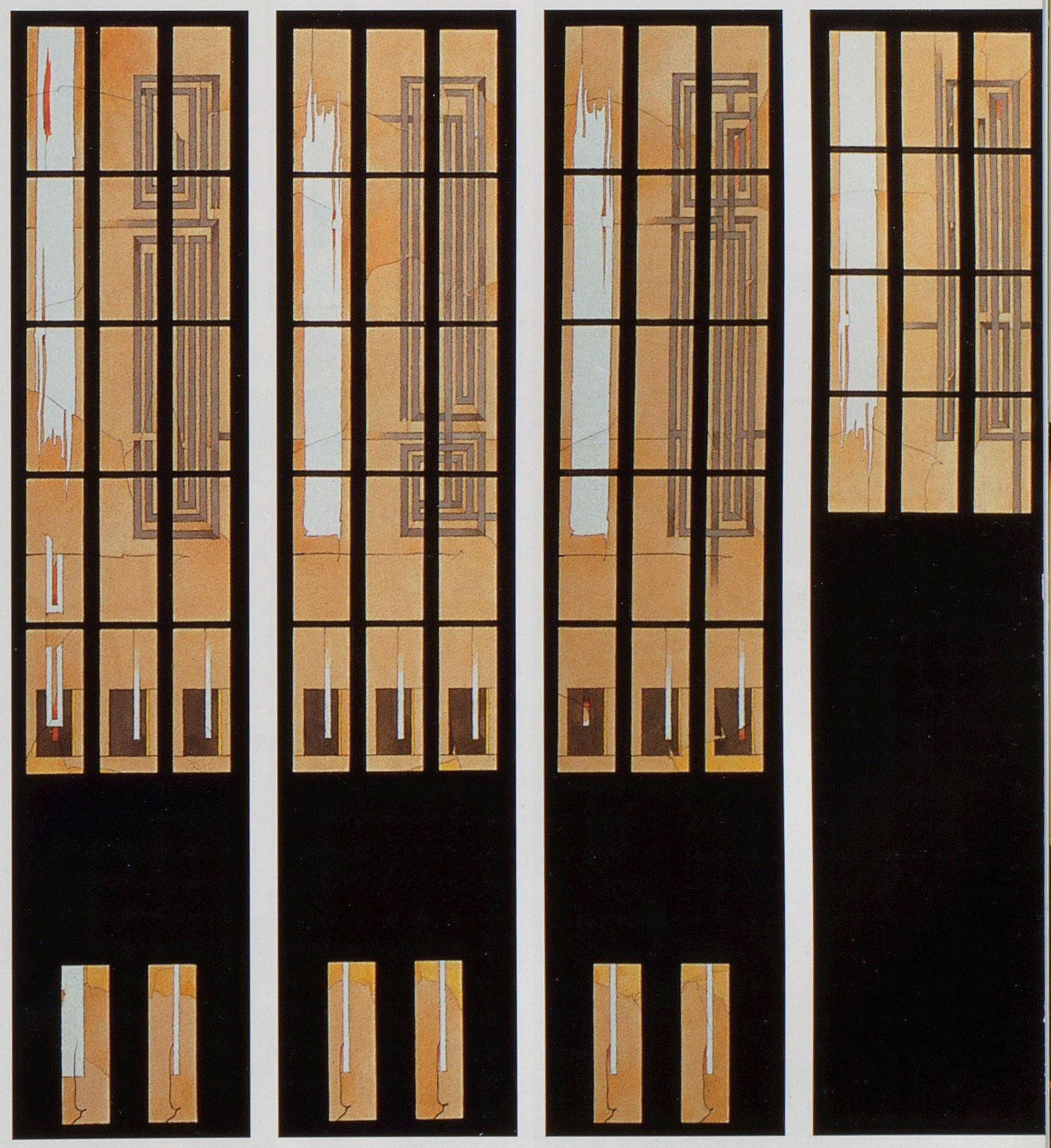
Design for the windows, of Stiftskirche Stuttgart, 2002.
