= Lorenz Lechler =

German medieval master mason

Lorenz Lechler was a late 15th-century German master mason who composed Instructions, a booklet on gothic design, and who contributed to the Heidelberg Church. As a master mason, Lechler's writing gives insight into Gothic architecture from the perspective of a builder as opposed to the more common contemporary perspectives written by clerics.

== Career ==
Lechler's Instructions, was written for his son Moritz in 1516, at a time when the Late Gothic was being displaced by the Renaissance. He writes that "[a]n honourable work glorifies its master, if it stands up," and goes on to show how elevation measurements are taken from a ground plan specifically in the construction of a late medieval German hall church. Lechler describes how the width of a church choir becomes the modular unit for producing other construction measurements. For example, the outside wall of the church is one-tenth the width of the choir, and is used further to generate smaller measurements for buttresses, windows, etc. The treatise is described as "unsystematic" in its treatment of the different structural components, including "canopies, [the] orientation of the choir by means of a compass, tower (strength of the wall and of the foundation), pile-work, tracery, ... pinnacles of various heights, and gables." In addition, because it describes a simple church hall rather than an elaborate 13th-century Rayonnant-style French cathedral, its content should not be generalized to all period masons or construction methodologies.

In some academic writing, the name "Lacher" is used to describe Lechler's work. The same academic notes that Lechler used an absolute measurement unit of Schuh, or "shoe", which is approximately thirty centimetres.

Known as the Unterweisung in German, Lechler's Instructions comes to us via a 16th-century notebook belonging to Jacob Feucht von Andernach, which also included a copy of Matthäus Roritzer's Booklet Concerning Pinnacle Correctitude. Dates in the Andernach notebook suggest that Lechler's text was copied between 1593-96.

Lechler is known to have been the master mason for the tabernacle in the Church of St. Dionysius in Esslingen (1486–89). Its ground plan, which would today be called an architectural sketch, is found in the booklet.
