= Bibliotheca Palatina =

Former library in Germany

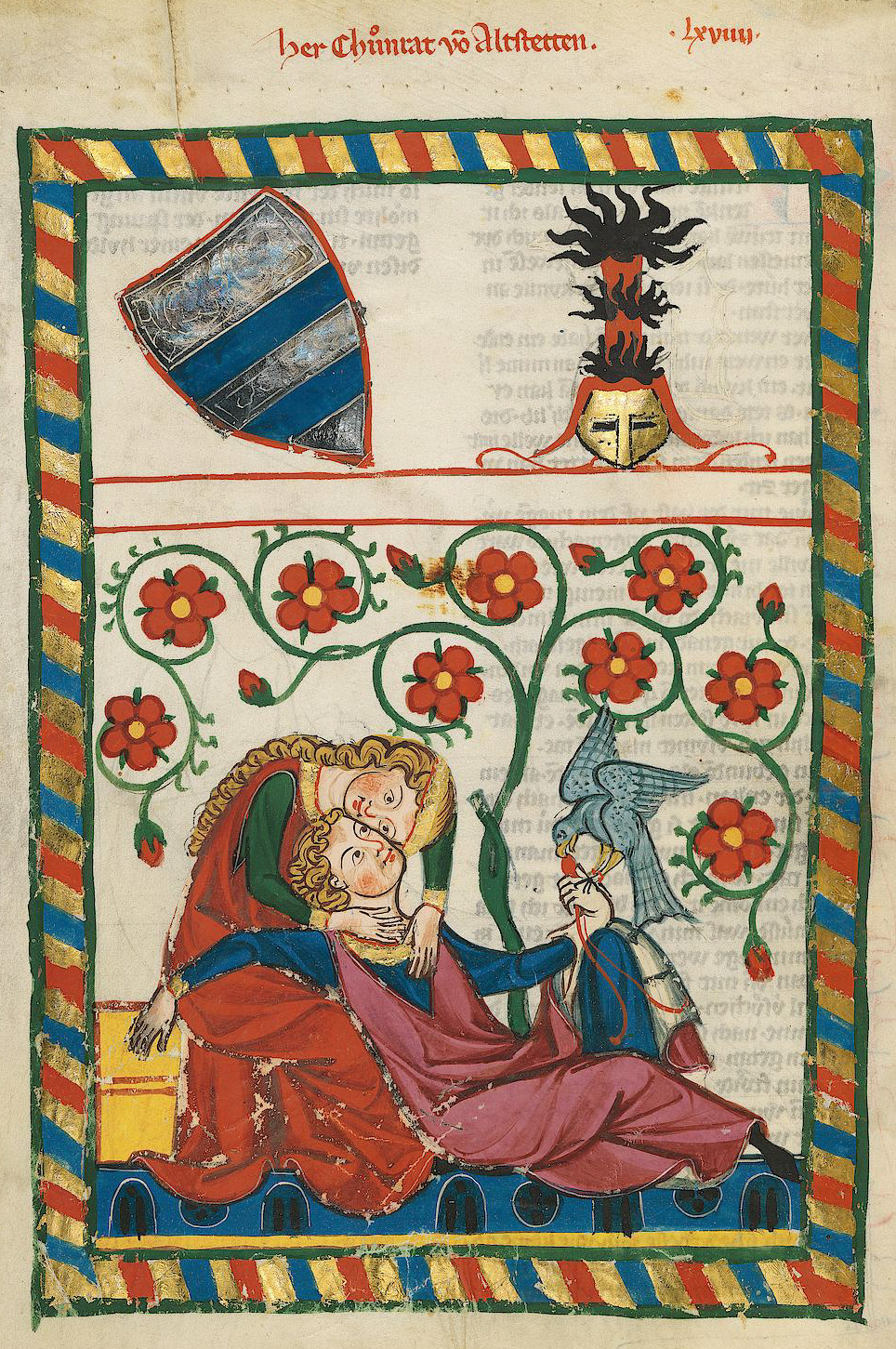
Codex Manesse: Konrad von Altstetten.

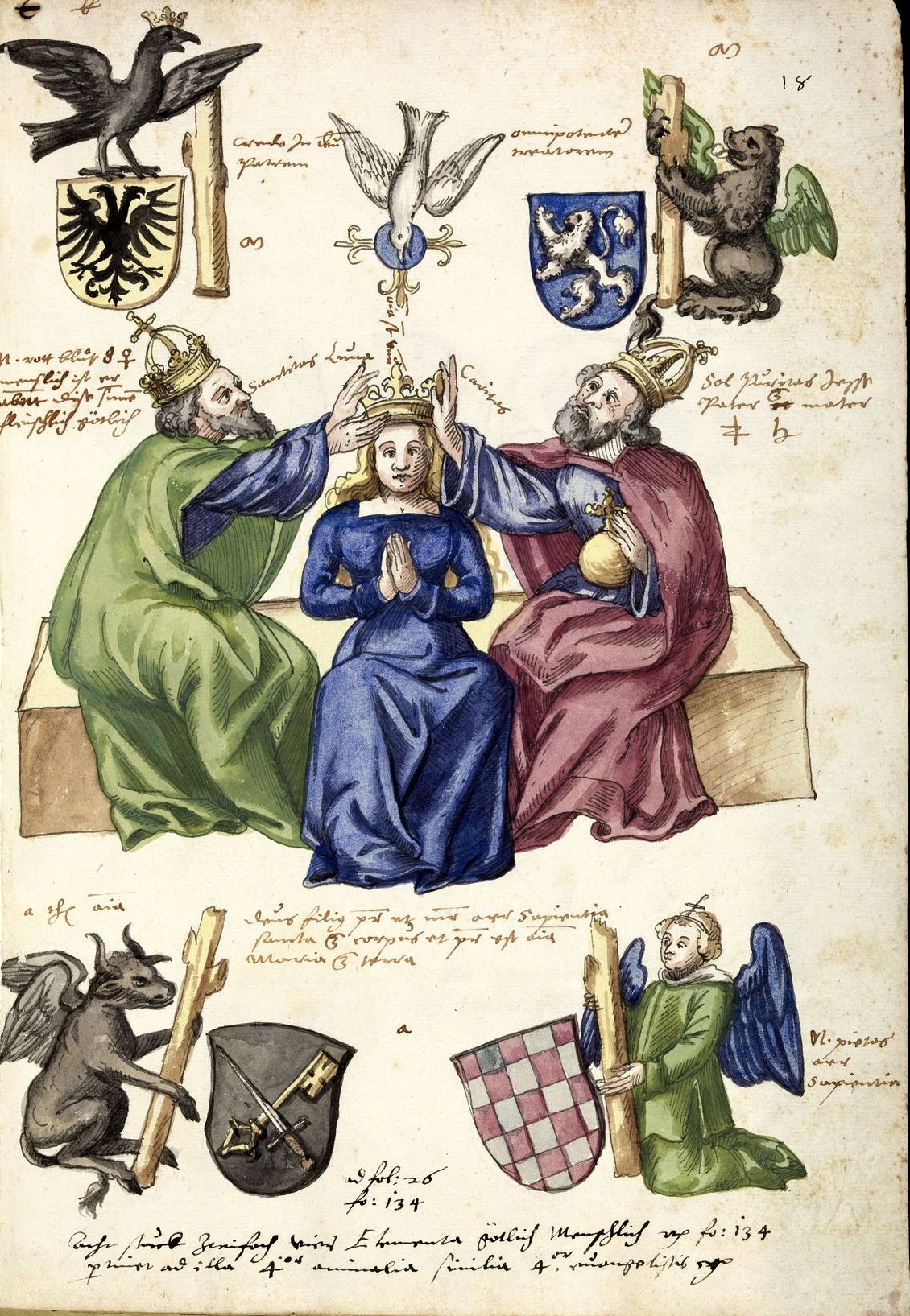
Illustration from the Buch der Heiligen Dreifaltigkeit, 1565–1585

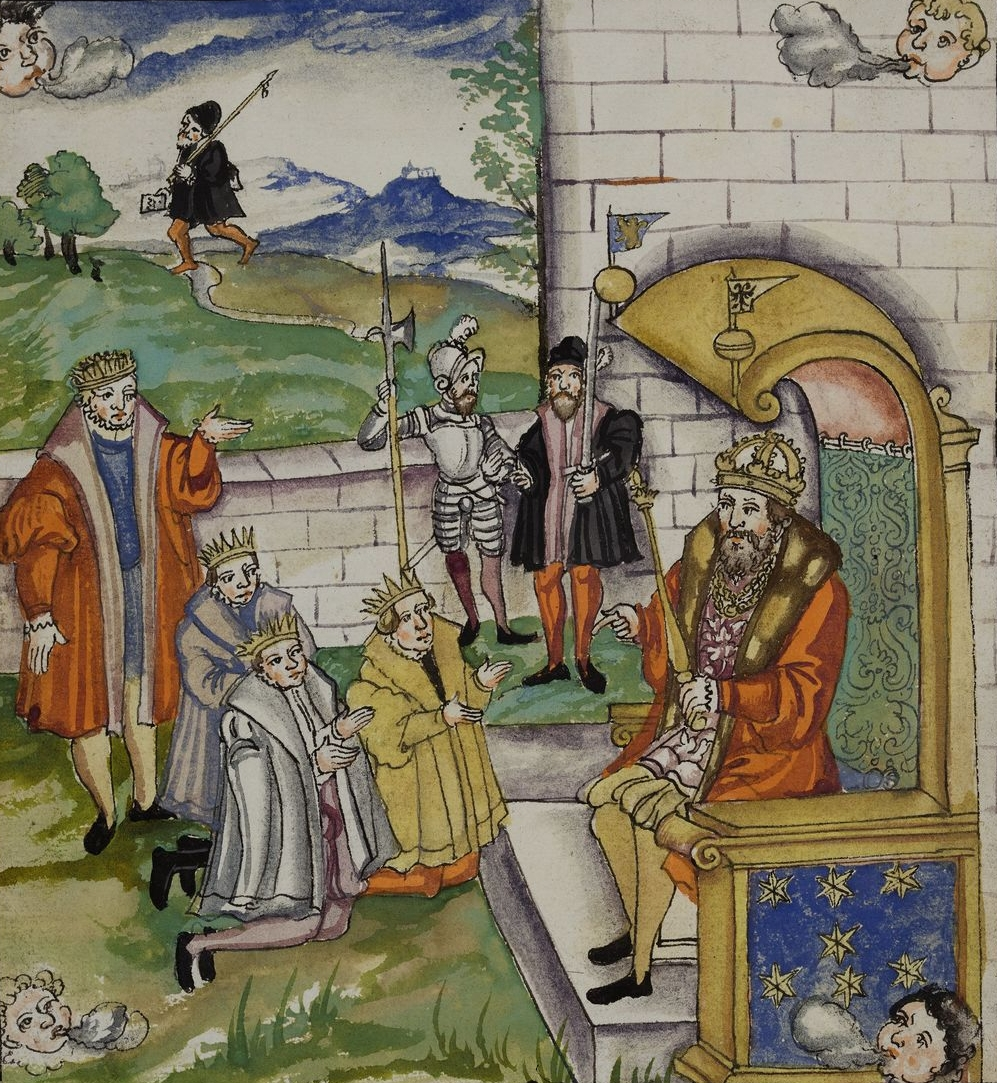
Kaiser and three crowned men kneeling in front of him, 1565–1585

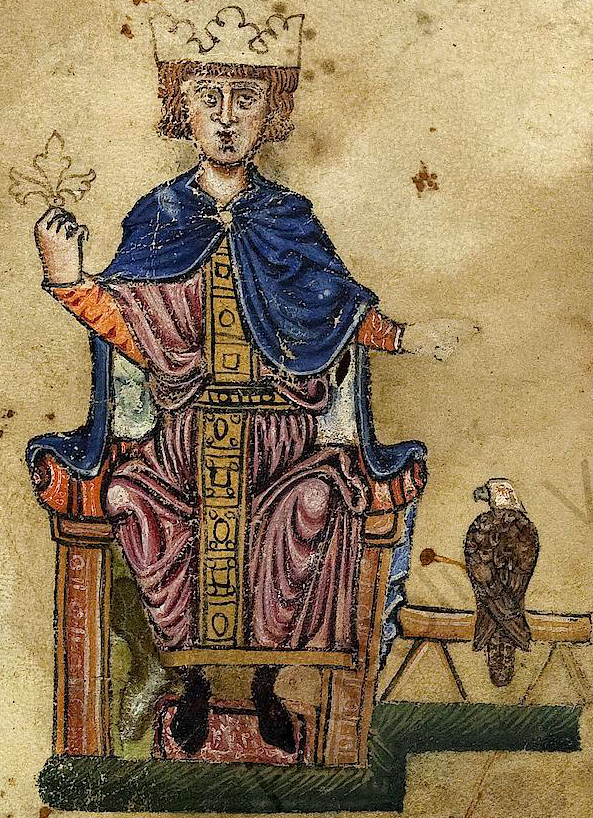
Frederick II as depicted in De arte venandi cum avibus

The Bibliotheca Palatina ("Palatinate library") of Heidelberg was the most important library of the German Renaissance, numbering approximately 5,000 printed books and 3,524 manuscripts. The Bibliotheca was a prominent prize captured during the Thirty Years' War, taken as booty by Maximilian of Bavaria, and given to the Pope in a symbolic and political gesture. While some of the books and manuscripts are now held by the University of Heidelberg, the bulk of the original collection is now an integral part of the Bibliotheca Apostolica Vaticana at the Vatican.

The important collection of German-language manuscripts have shelf-marks beginning cpg (older usage: Cod. Pal. ger., for "Codices Palatini germanici"), while the vast Latin manuscript collection has shelf-marks with cpl (or Cod. Pal. lat., for "Codices Palatini latini").

== Foundation ==
In the 1430s, Elector Louis III founded the Stiftsbibliothek in the Heiliggeistkirche, which had good light for reading. This library formed the core of the Palatine Collection established by Elector Ottheinrich in the 1550s, together with the University Library Heidelberg. Essential manuscripts from the original Bibliotheca Palatina include the Carolingian "Lorsch Evangelary", the Falkenbuch (De arte venandi cum avibus, cpl 1071, commissioned by Frederick II), and the Codex Manesse (cpg 848)

Further important manuscripts were acquired from the collection of Ulrich Fugger (d. 1584), notably the illustrated Sachsenspiegel (cpg 164). Joseph Scaliger considered this Fugger Library superior to that owned by the Pope; the manuscripts alone were valued at 80,000 crowns, a very considerable sum in the 16th century.

== Thirty Years War ==
The Palatinate suffered heavily in the Thirty Years War, and in 1622 Heidelberg was sacked by the Catholic League, whose general Count von Tilly was in the employ of Maximilian of Bavaria. As book plundering was a source of both Catholic and Protestant cultural triumph during the Thirty Year's War, the occupiers jostled for control of the library.

Maximilian originally wanted to add the Bibiliotheca Palatina to his own library in Munich. Ferdinand II also sought it, sending counter-instructions to Tilly to keep it for his own collection in Vienna. Although many books were torn or "dispersed among private hands" during the sack, Pope Gregory XV convinced Maximilian to present the remaining manuscripts to the Vatican as "a sign of his loyalty and esteem" and to support his claim to the Palatinate's electoral title. The preparations to secure transport the collection to Rome were supervised by the Greek scholar Leo Allatius, sent to Heidelberg by the Vatican.

The Bibliotheca was a prominent prize captured during the Thirty Years' War. The victors were concerned not just with carrying away the collection and thus stripping the Calvinist party of one of its most important intellectual symbols; they also had wanted to eliminate all documentation of the library's provenance. The capture of the Palatine library was a carefully orchestrated symbolic act of looting in the Thirty Years' War, and triggered further acts of similar confiscations throughout the course of the hostilities.

Thus, as of 1623, the entire remaining library had been incorporated into the Bibliotheca Apostolica Vaticana, with each volume preserving, as a memorial, a leaf with the Wittelsbach arms.

By the Treaty of Tolentino (1797), the Pope ceded 37 manuscripts to the French Republic, which had them deposited in the Bibliothèque nationale in Paris. After the Congress of Vienna in 1814–1815 decreed "the general restoration [or return] of works of art, of which the French had robbed other countries," the contested manuscripts were conveyed from Paris to Heidelberg, rather than to Rome. In 1816, Prince Hardenberg and Ignaz Heinrich von Wessenberg persuaded Pope Pius VII to make a gift of 852 manuscripts, mostly in German, to the University of Heidelberg.

For the University Jubilee, some other books were temporarily brought back from the Vatican and were displayed at the Heiliggeistkirche in 1986.

== See also ==
- Index of Vatican City-related articles
