= Holy Ghost hole =

Symbolic circular opening in the ceiling of a church

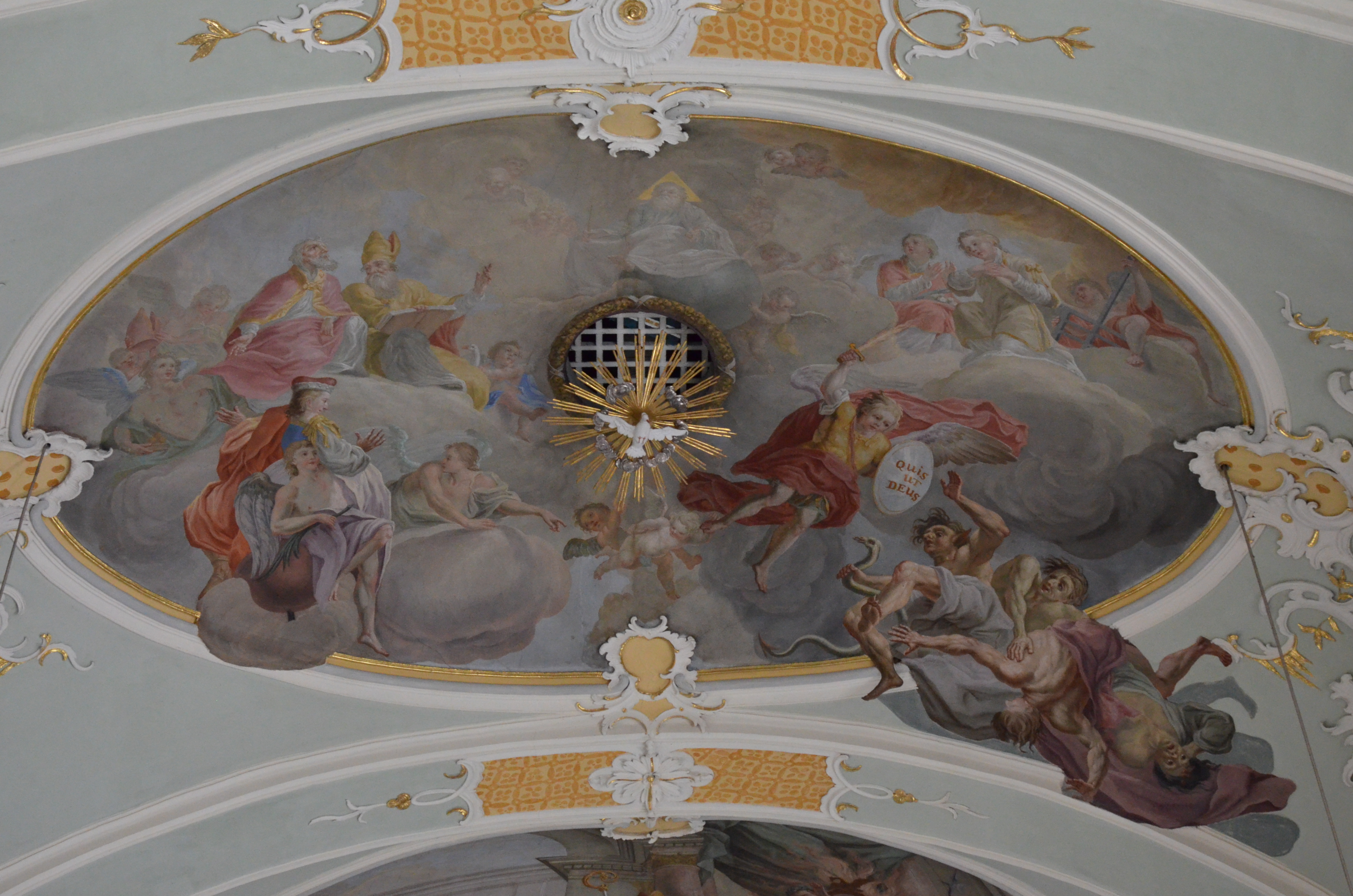
A Holy Ghost hole in the center of a fresco with a latticework covering and a dove figure, Parish church of Wiesing.

A Holy Ghost hole, or Holy Spirit hole, is a circular opening in the ceiling of a church which symbolises the descent of the Holy Spirit on the day of Pentecost. The openings are often used for liturgical performances.

They were most commonly built in churches in Austria and southern Germany during the Middle Ages and Baroque period, though classicizing architectural elements often replicate their appearance. Baroque organ sound-holes, in particular, were often decorated or disguised as Holy Ghost holes. Other features of church architecture which are similarly built into the apex of a ceiling or dome, such as oculi, often closely resemble Holy Ghost holes.

== Usage ==
Holy Ghost holes have been used in a variety of ways during Pentecost sermons to symbolise the descent of the Holy Spirit. Live doves may have previously been released from the openings during the Middle Ages, though the practice has been replaced by dove figurines, suspended from the ceiling and lowered through the opening. To symbolise the "tongues of fire" as described in Acts 2:3, burning oakum was often dropped from the hole onto the congregation below. Today, rose petals are more commonly released, as is most famously done at the Pantheon. (Note: The Pantheon, however, having been built in pre-Christian times, features an oculus, not a Holy Ghost hole. The practice of releasing rose petals at the Pantheon likely predates the emergence of holy ghost holes in church architecture.)

In addition to these, the holes may also be used on the Feast of the Ascension. A common ceremony is a figurine or statue of Jesus is lifted up through the ceiling, suspended by a string, symbolising the Ascension of Jesus. Documentation of this tradition dates as early as the baroque period. The tradition is still practiced in some churches in rural Austria and Germany.

== Decoration ==
Holy Ghost holes are typically decorated with Pentecost motifs, such as doves, rays of light, and flames. The hole may be permanently left open, displaying a dove figurine or other depictions of the Holy Spirit. However, the holes are mostly covered by latticework or a wooden lid which is only opened for liturgical performances.

In some cases, the decorations surrounding the hole may be relatively neutral. For example, they may be depictions of angels with instruments, without symbols tying the scene to any particular biblical story. In these cases, it can be assumed the opening would be used for a variety of other liturgical performances throughout the year.

== Gallery ==
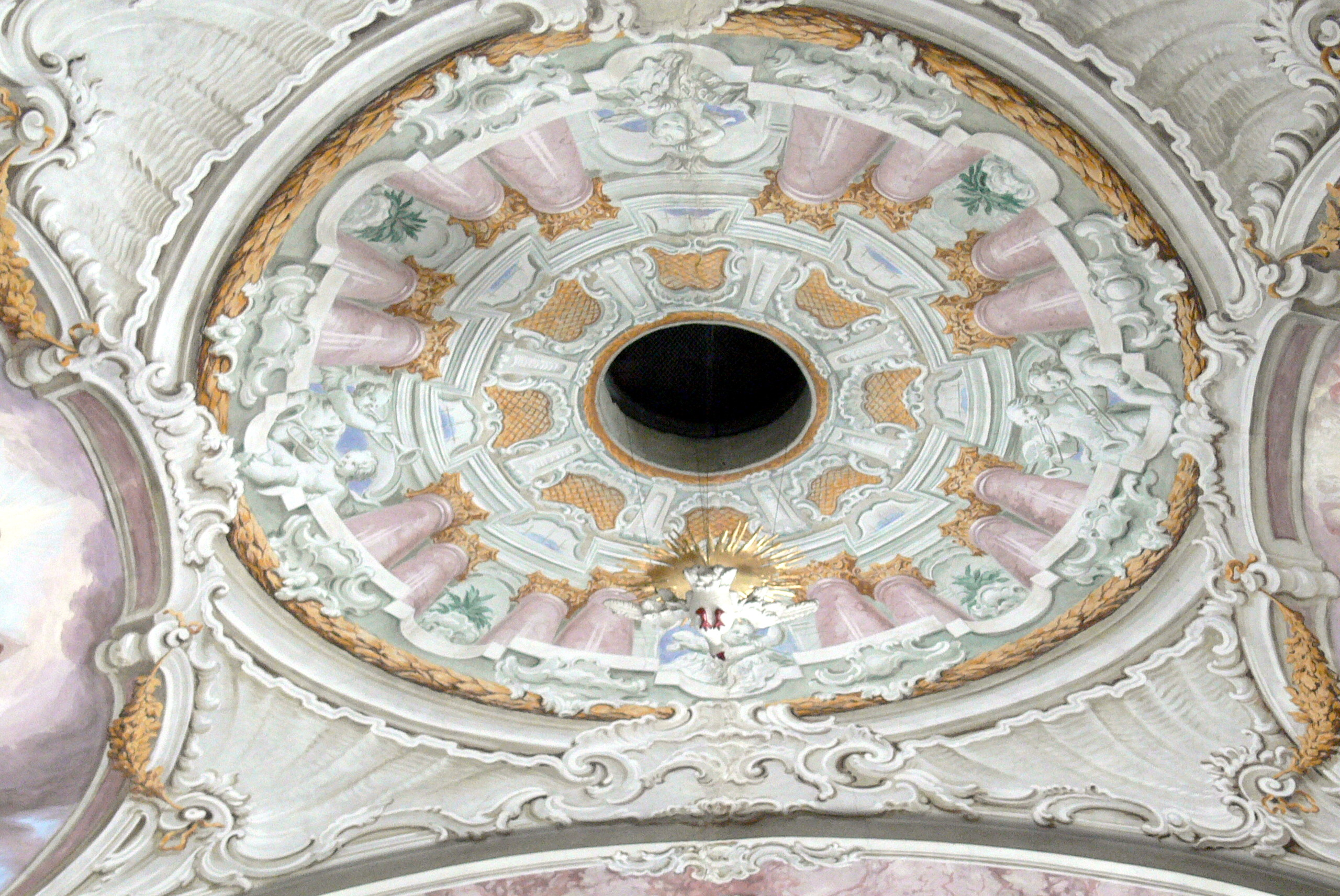
Holy Spirit hole hung with a wooden dove, Saints Peter and Paul parish church in Söll.

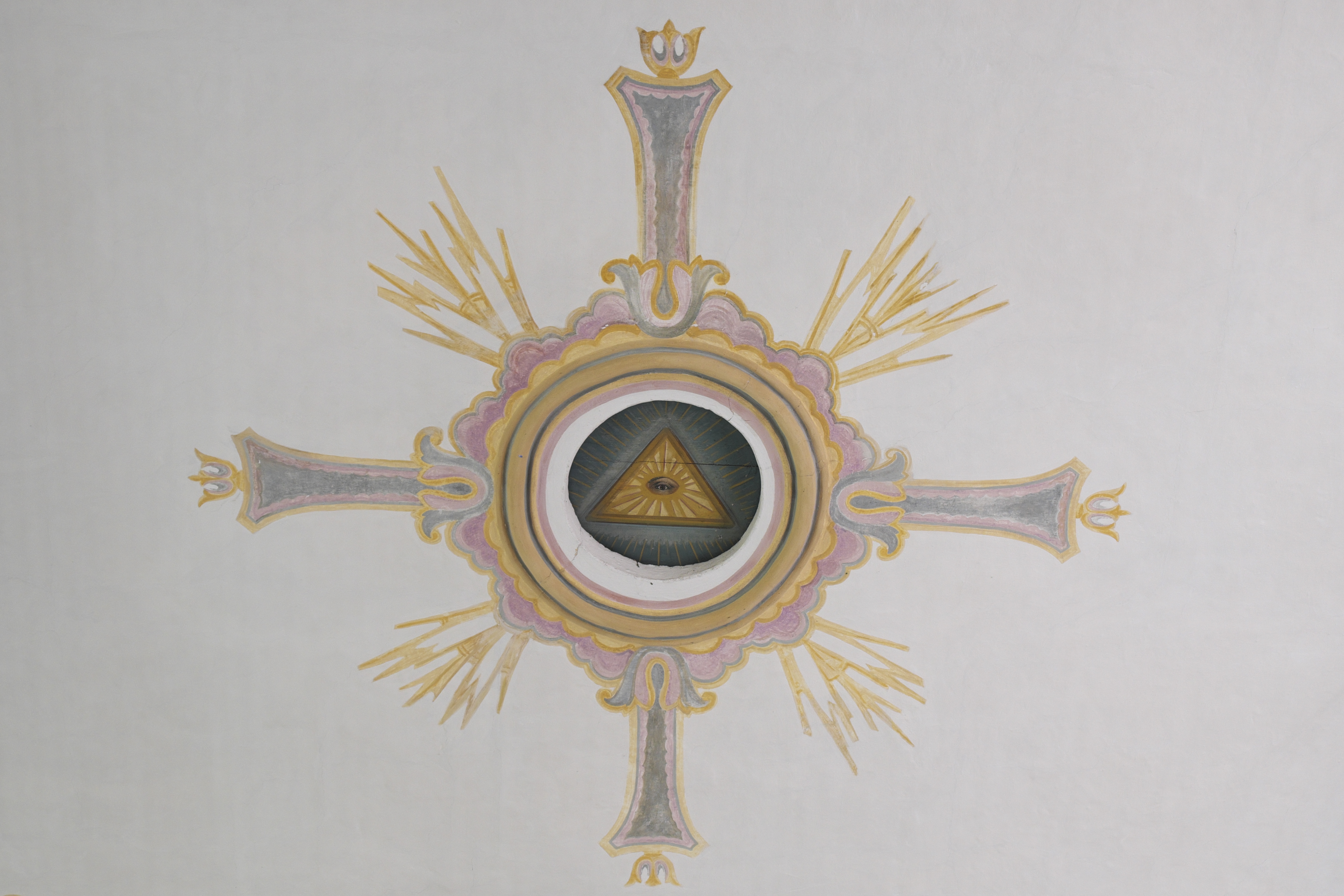
Holy Ghost hole depicting the Eye of Providence, Church of St. Michael, Ziegelbach, Germany.

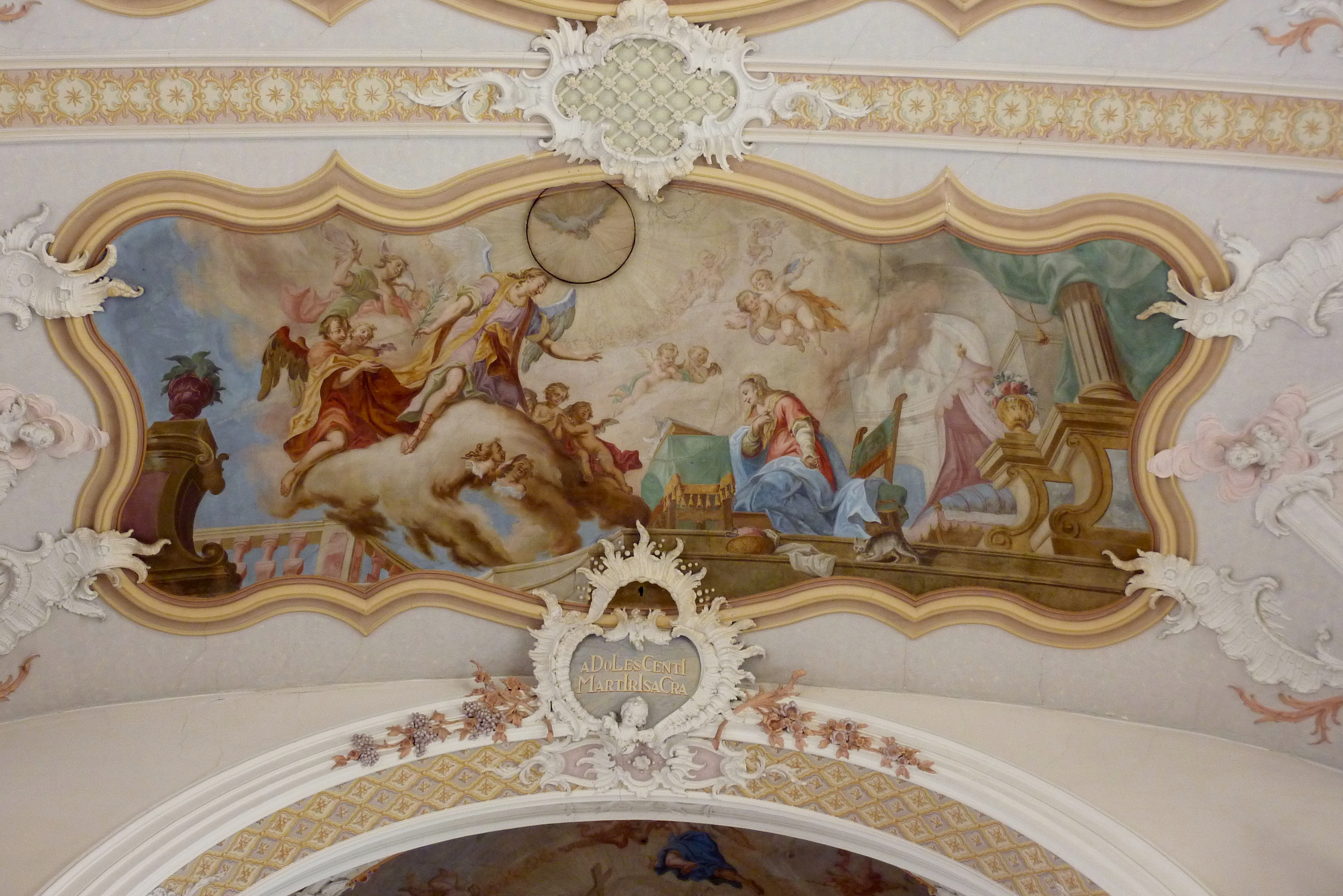
A Holy Ghost hole covered by a painting of a Pentecostal dove, St. Vitus church in Donaualtheim, Germany.

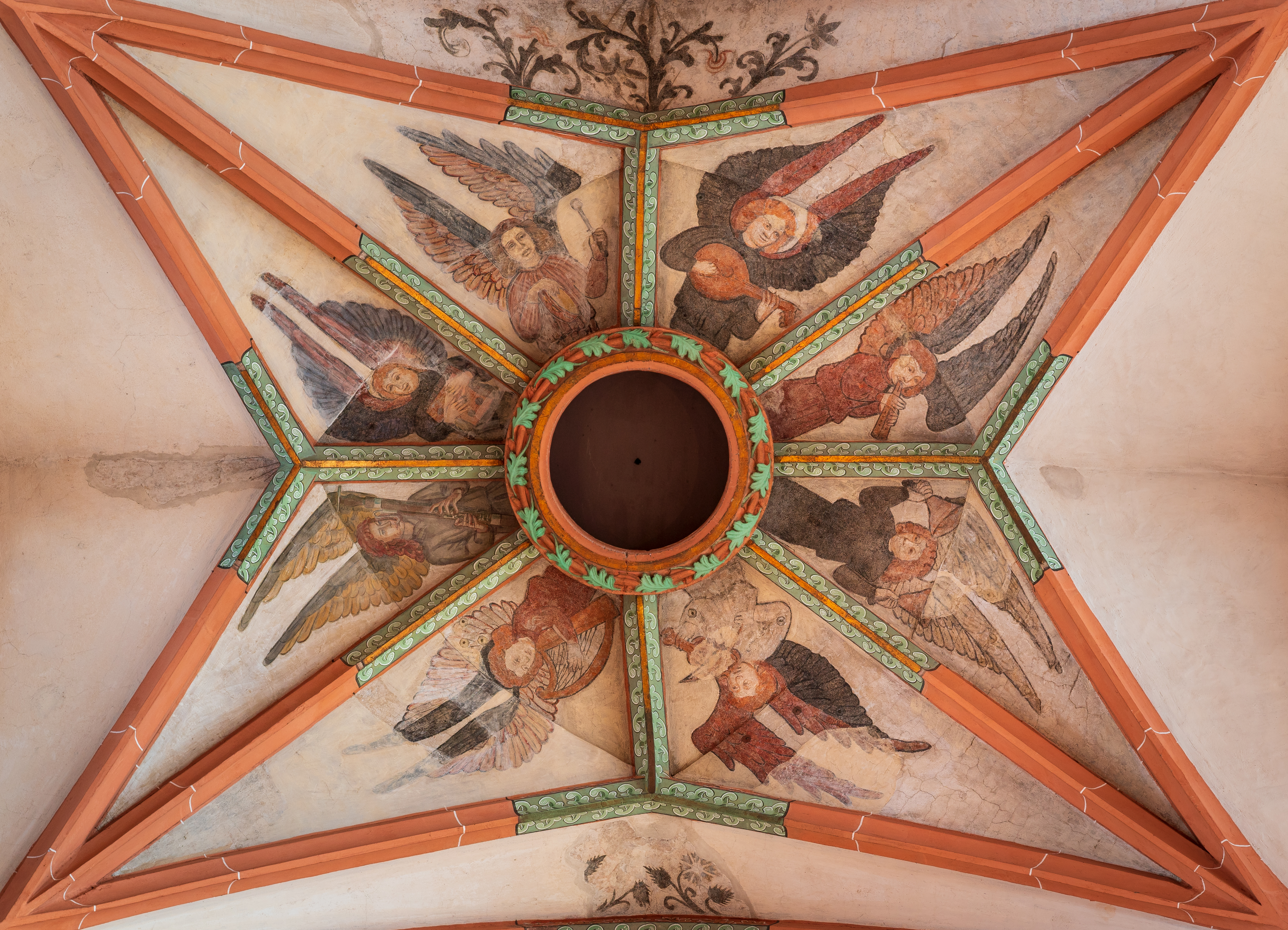
Gothic Holy Ghost hole framed by 15th-century frescos at Church of the Holy Spirit, Heidelberg.

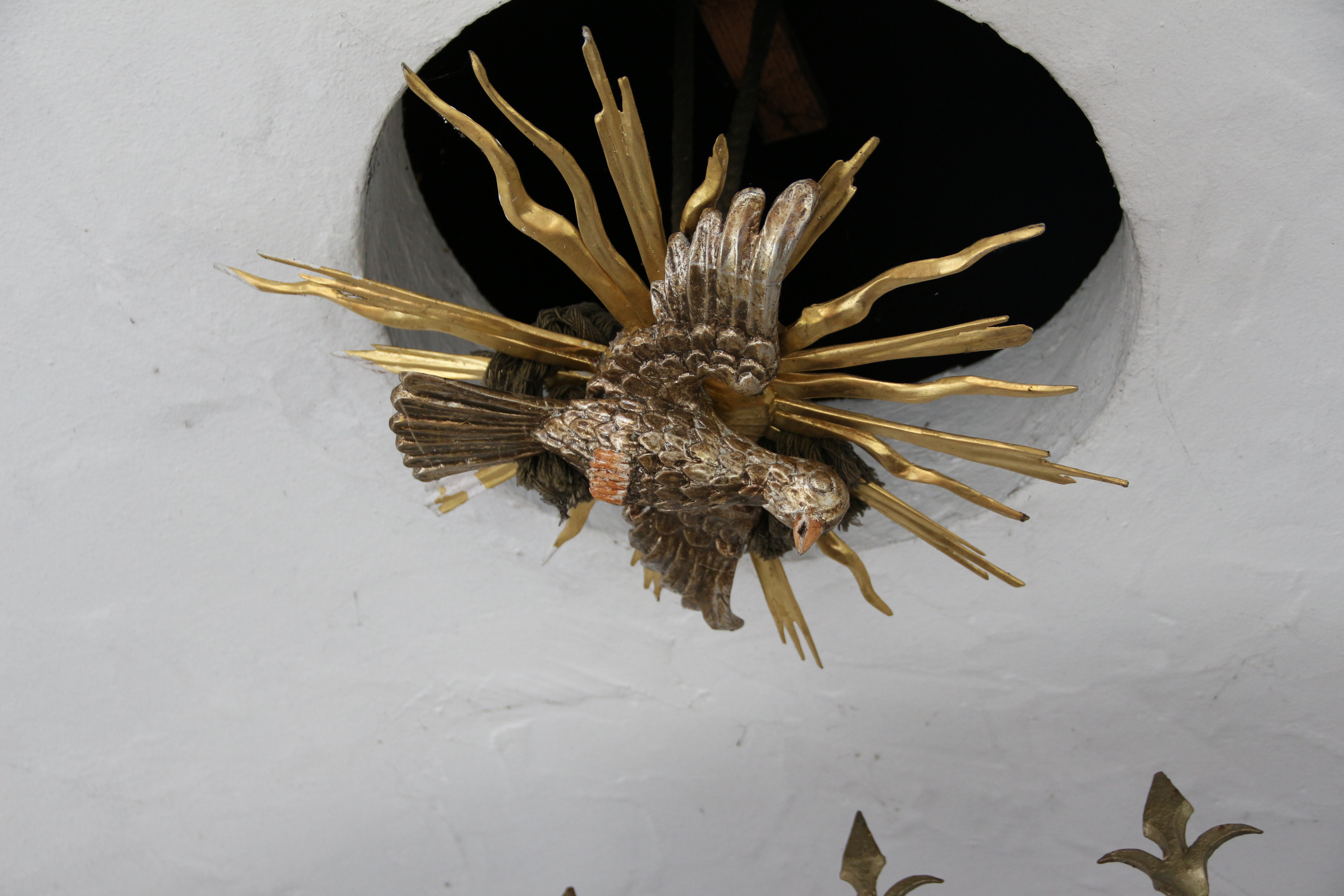
A dove figure with "tongues of fire" suspended through a Holy Ghost hole, Kapelle Schanz in Ebbs.

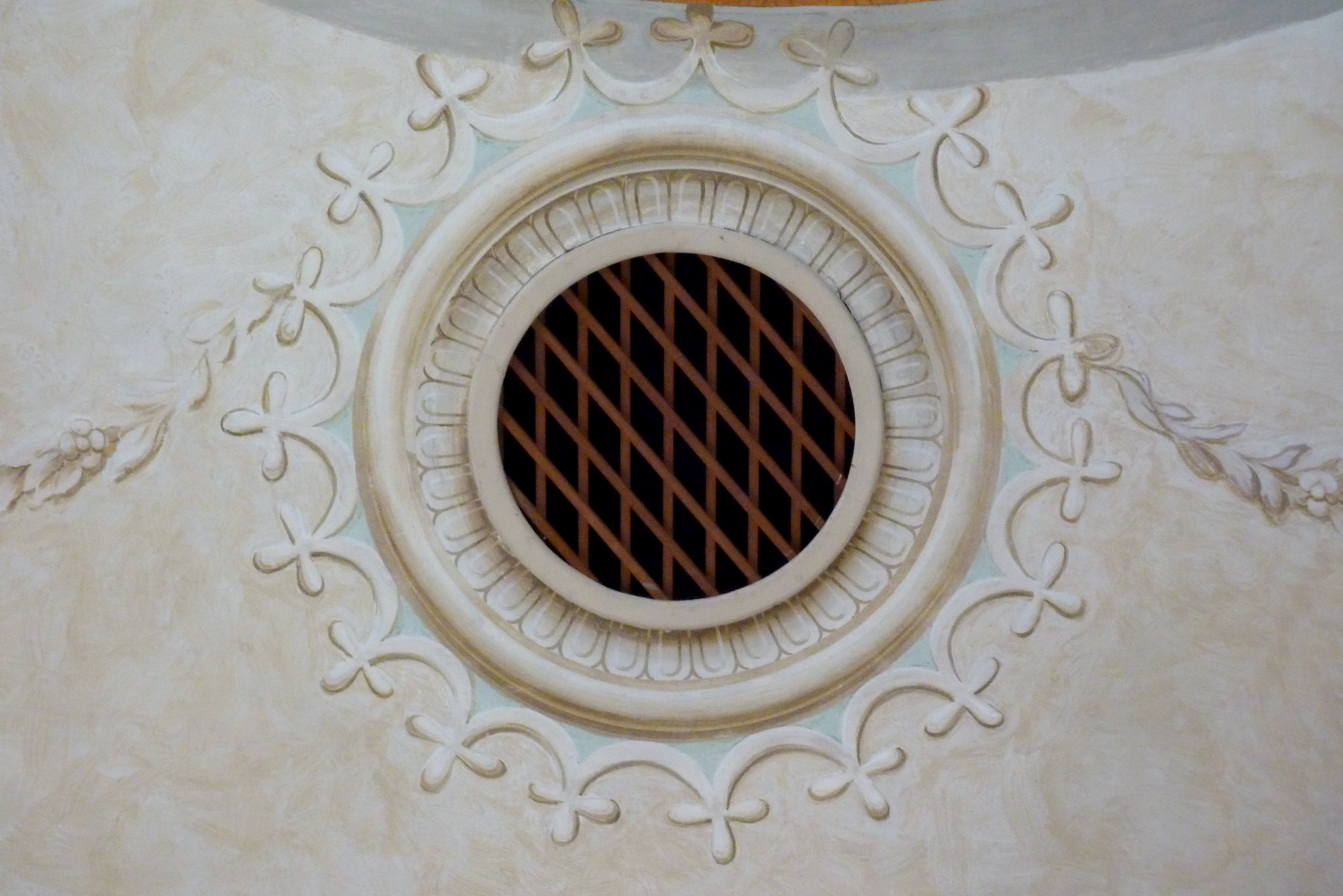
Holy Ghost hole covered by wooden latticework, St. Vitus and Katharina in Rehling.
