= Church of the Holy Spirit, Heidelberg =

Church in Baden-Württemberg, Germany

Church of the Holy Spirit
- Heiliggeistkirche
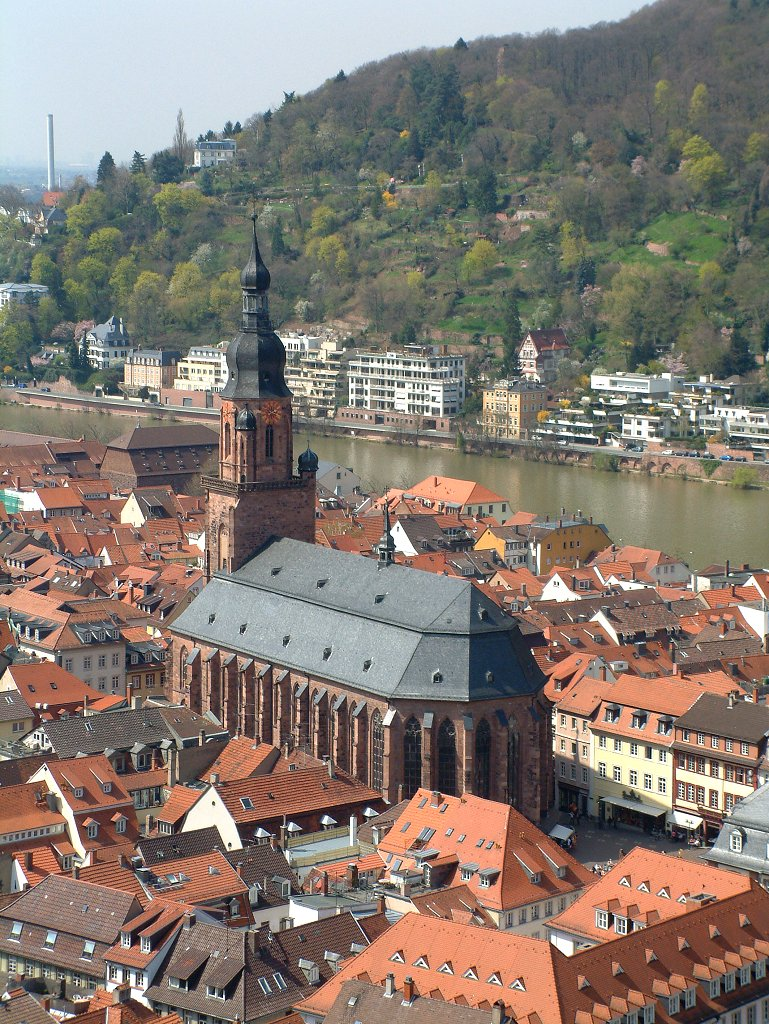
- The Church of the Holy Spirit as seen from Heidelberg Castle
- Church of the Holy Spirit
- 49°24′44″N 8°42′34″E
- Location: Heidelberg, Germany
- Denomination: Protestant Church in Germany
- Previous denomination: Roman Catholic
- Website: heiliggeist-heidelberg.de

Architecture
- Years built: 1398–1515

The Church of the Holy Spirit (German: Heiliggeistkirche) is the largest church in Heidelberg, Germany. The church, located in the marketplace in the old town center, was constructed between 1398 and 1515 in the Romanesque and Gothic styles. It receives 1–3 million guests annually, making it among the most visited churches in Germany.

The church was planned as the burial place of the Electors of the Palatinate and as a representative church of the Palatinate royal seat. In the Palatine War of Succession, the princely graves of the Electors were destroyed; today only the grave of the founder of the church, Elector Ruprecht III, remains. The church was also the location of the founding of the Heidelberg University and was the original repository of the Bibliotheca Palatina.

The congregation was originally Roman Catholic, but the church has changed denominations more than ten times through its history. Intermittently, over a 300-year period, the nave and the choir of the church were separated by a wall, allowing both Catholics and Protestants to practice in the church at the same time. The wall was ultimately removed in 1936, and the congregation is now solely Protestant. Today, it is a parish church within the Evangelical Church of Heidelberg and is part of the Protestant Church in Germany.

== History ==
A manuscript from 1239 references a Romanesque chapel in the center of Heidelberg named “Zum Heilien Geist” (English: to the Holy Ghost). A Gothic, aisleless church was constructed on that site around 1300 and subsequently referred to as the Chapel of the Holy Spirit (Heiliggeistkapelle). King Rupert commissioned a new church building in 1398, which replaced the chapel and became the current Church of the Holy Spirit. The current church is the third sacral building on the site.

=== Congregations ===
Between the 16th and 20th centuries, the church changed confessions over ten times, between Lutheranism, Calvinism, Catholicism, and Old Catholicism. Sermons had been delivered in German at various points before the Reformation at the Church of the Holy Spirit, but Protestantism was not quickly adopted in Heidelberg. The first Protestant service was conducted at the Church of the Holy Spirit in 1546. Elector Otto Henry converted the region in 1557, and the church was officially designated as a Lutheran parish church. Otto Henry's successor, Friedrich III, converted the church to Calvinism and commissioned the Heidelberg Catechism.

In 1706, a succession crisis resulted in the church being divided in half in order to accommodate both Catholics and Protestants simultaneously, so that both congregations could hold their services without any mutual disturbance. The church was divided by a wall which separated the nave and the chancel, creating a second altar in the center of the church. In 1719, Elector Karl III Philipp ordered soldiers to occupy the church and tear down the wall in order to restore it to a purely Catholic place of worship. Political pressure from other states and the Holy Roman Empire forced him to re-erect the wall shortly thereafter. The wall was again removed in 1886, but was rebuilt once more as a result of the Kulturkampf and pressure from the Vatican. It was ultimately removed on 24 June 1936. The church has been solely Protestant since.

=== Bibliotheca Palatina ===
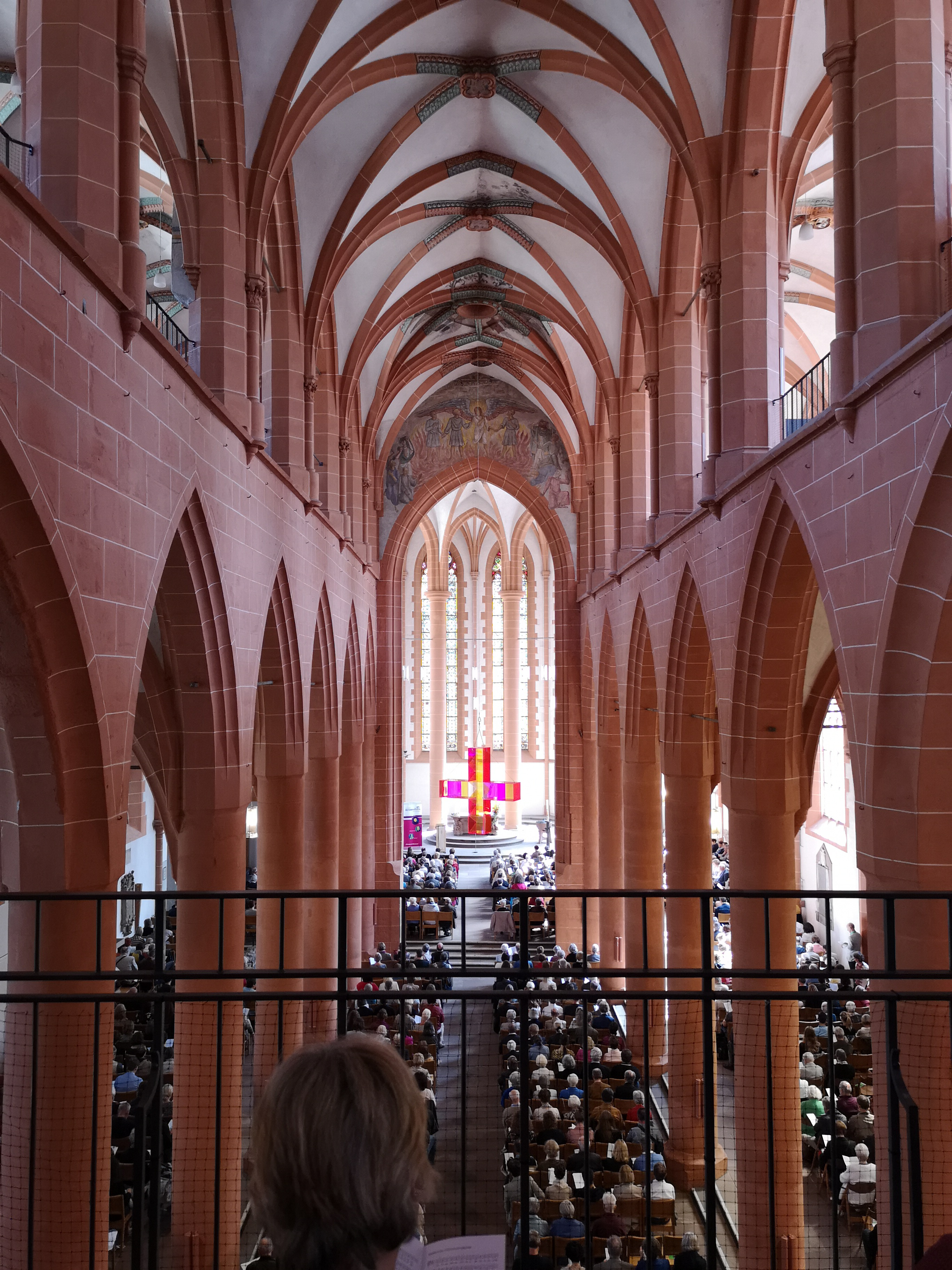
The nave of the church. The galleries are visible on the upper left and right.

The Bibliotheca Palatina was founded and originally kept in the gallery of the Church of the Holy Spirit, where good light for reading was available. It contained several collections, including the libraries of Heidelberg University, Heidelberg Castle, and several monasteries.

During the Thirty Years War, this collection of manuscripts and early printed books were taken as loot and presented to the Pope by the Count of Tilly, who commanded the Catholic League’s forces at Heidelberg in 1622. Reportedly 54 oxcarts filled with crates of books were taken to Rome from the Church of the Holy Spirit. They now form the Vatican Library's Bibliotheca Palatina collection. As a result of the Congress of Vienna, 847 of the german manuscripts from this collection were returned to the University of Heidelberg in 1816. For the University's 600th anniversary, a further collection of 588 of the Bibliotheca's documents were temporarily exhibited at the Church. Much of the exhibition contained documents detailing the workings of the former library itself: from the former library's binding techniques to records on the library's removal in 1623.

== Architecture ==
=== Construction ===
Documents name Arnold Rype, a former mayor of Heidelberg, as the church's "master builder". At the time, the term "master builder" referred not to the architect but the financial initiator. The only known architects are Hans Marx, who worked on the church until 1426, as well as Jorg, who was responsible until 1439. Both men probably supervised work on the nave. Under the reign of Prince-elector Frederick I, a noted specialist in the construction of church towers, Niclaus Eseler, came from Mainz to Heidelberg and was likely responsible for the execution of the primary work on the church's spire, though the steeple was completed by Lorenz Lechler.

Construction began in 1398 when the cornerstone was laid. The choir was completed and consecrated in 1411, and the nave finished in 1441. The construction of the steeple was started in the same year, but works were interrupted until 1508, and the tower was finished in 1544.

=== Restoration ===
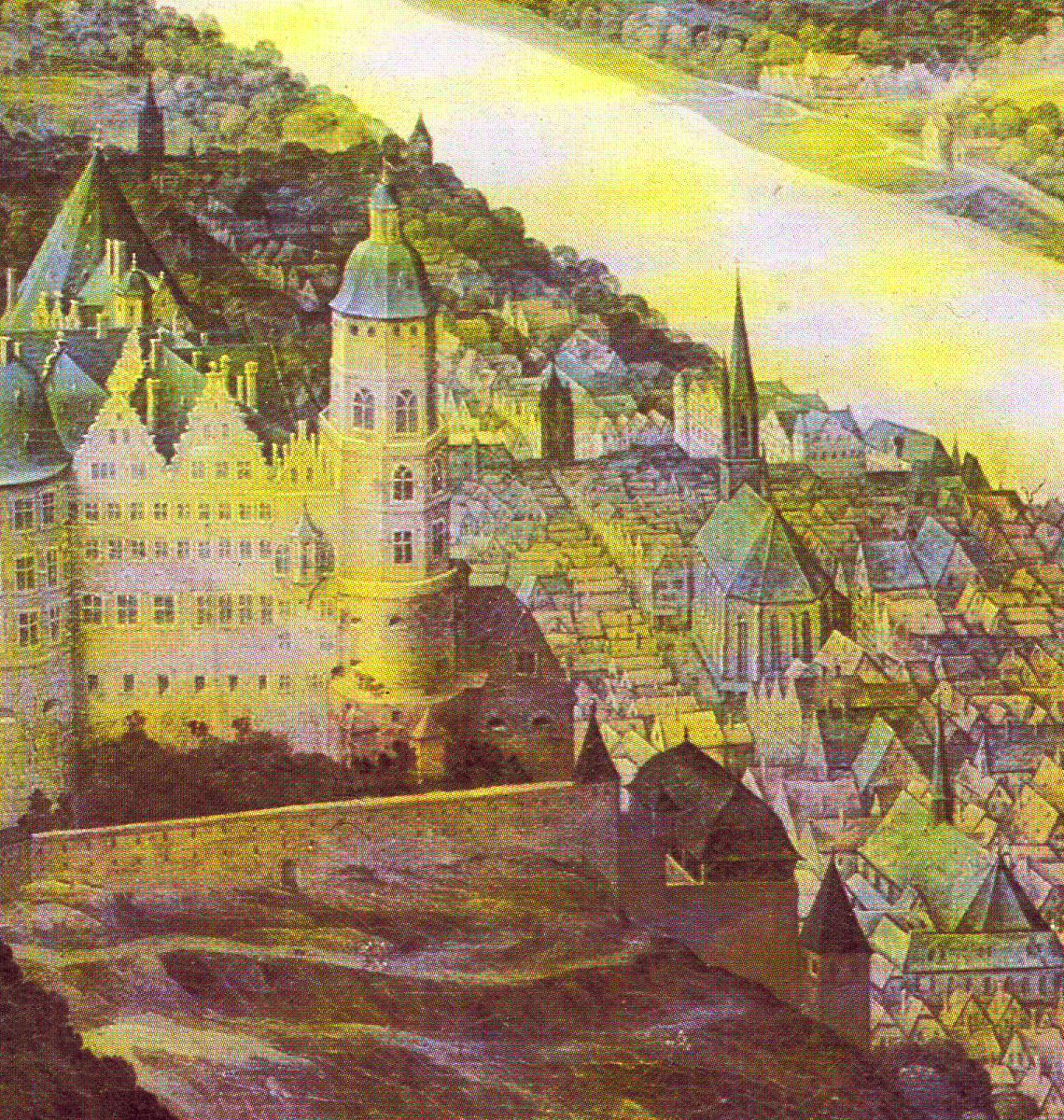
Painting of Heidelberg by Jacques Fouquièr from around 1618. The Church of the Holy Spirit is visible on the right with its original Gothic steeple.

During the Palatinate War of Succession, the church was raided by French forces in 1693 and significantly damaged by a fire. The fire destroyed the church tower, which was rebuilt in 1709 in a baroque style. A viewing platform inside the main spire is accessible to the public via a narrow staircase with a total of 208 steps. The platform is located 38 meters above ground level.

The 1693 fire damaged the roof, and resulting in decades of water damage in much of the building. Late 18th century restoration efforts greatly altered the original design of the building. Crumbling, octagonal sandstone pillars were sanded-down to round columns. Medieval frescoes were either plastered over, or reinterpreted in baroque style.

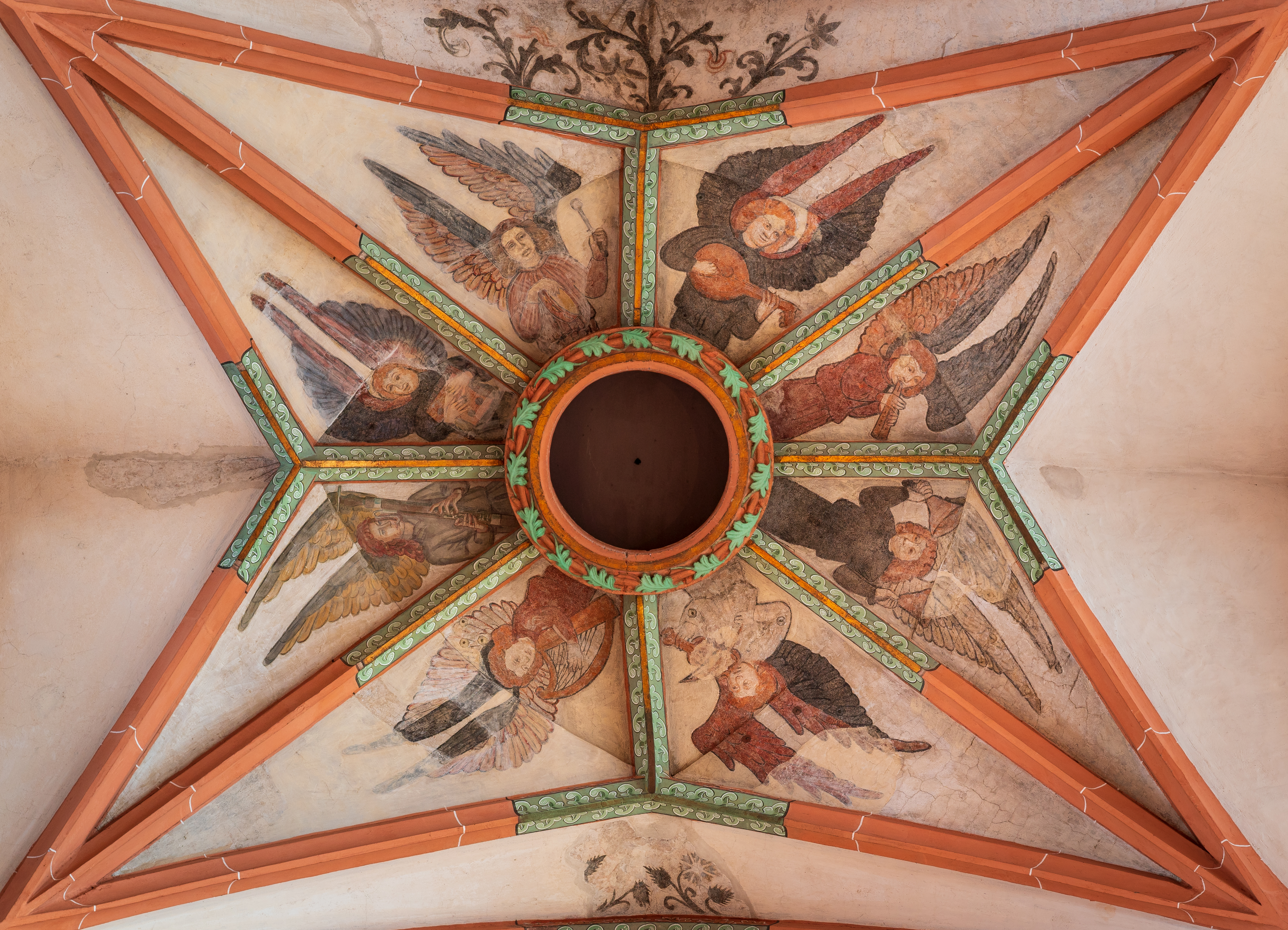
15th century fresco on the ceiling of the nave.

One of the vaults of the nave is decorated with a fresco, created around 1440. Each of the vault's eight panels are decorated with an angel playing a unique instrument. The fresco was restored in 1950 by Harry MacLean, who added a bassoon to one angel, which was not original to the piece. A Holy Ghost hole sits between the eight angels.

=== Stained glass ===
Heiliggeistkirche's original medieval stained glass windows were destroyed by the fire of 1693. None of the original windows were preserved and no record or attestation to what they looked like exists. To replace the damaged windows, emergency glazing was introduced in the 19th century, principally in the choir and along the south aisle of the nave. Matching windows, installed on the north aisle, were subsequently destroyed in 1945 during the Second World War. The poor condition of the 19th century glazing became a pressing issue in the mid 20th century, resulting in a historically significant series of unrealised attempts to commission the design of a unified programme of stained glass windows from contemporary artists.

In the mid-1970s, the regional church board voted to replace the 19th century additions, as part of a broader restoration and repair of the interior. As a result, two significant efforts were made in the 1970s and 1990s to reinstall stained glass into these windows through a programme of artworks by a single artist. Initially, the German artist Johannes Schreiter was commissioned in 1977 to undertake the project and design a total of twenty-two pieces, but negative response to his designs and the resulting Heidelbergerfensterstreit (‘Heidelberg Window Controversy’) meant that only one complete work, the Physikfenster (‘Physics Window’) was made and installed into the church, in 1984. Subsequently, the British artist Brian Clarke was asked to submit a proposal for the remaining windows. His resulting designs drew on the history of the site's location as the repository of the Biblioteca Palatina and its link to the development of Calvinism through the 1563 Heidelberg Catechism. Ultimately, of Clarke's designs were implemented.

During the late 1990s, Hella Santarossa won a subsequent 1997 competition for a series of five windows whose core element is treated, broken coloured glass. Santarossa is a member of the Derix family, one of the major stained glass studios in Germany. Her series of five windows were installed in the north nave.

==== The "Heidelberger Fensterstreit" ====
The most famed and controversial stained glass works commissioned for the church are those of Johannes Schreiter, commissioned in 1977 to design twenty-two stained glass windows. At the time, this was to be the largest stained glass commission to have been granted to a single artist. The resulting avant-garde designs, which incorporated references from science, medicine, philosophy, and the analogue technologies of the day, became the subject of a cultural and theological dispute known as the "Heidelberg Controversy" (German: Heidelbergerfensterstreit Fensterstreit). This dispute is cited as "the most intense controversy on record involving twentieth century stained glass".

Schreiter's designs had previously been debated and tested within a focus group including theologians, art critics, and church attendees. They were then presented to the public in 1984 when the first window was installed on the south isle. This window is known as the "Physikfenster" (English: "Physics Window"). Its critical theme immediately became controversial. Critics called the Physics Window overly conceptual, elitist, and secularly dejected. When sketches of Schreiter's following pieces were released, local parishioners were reportedly disenfranchised by their themes. Protests, parish votes, and petitions ultimately prevented their installation. Nine years after Schreiter was commissioned, the project was officially terminated on June 23, 1986. Schreiter had originally been commissioned to create ten separate pieces for the nave; the ensuing controversy caused the remaining nine to be abandoned. The Physics Window remains the only work of Schreiter's installed in the church, though other windows from the series have since been purchased and displayed by independent organisations, including other churches and hospital clinics.

The Physics Window is 458 cm tall and 125 cm wide. The majority of the piece is red, representing the Holy Spirit; a white arrow at the top represents the Holy Spirit descending to earth. Only two points on the piece are in bright blue: one highlighting Albert Einstein's mass–energy equivalence, E=mc^{2}, and the other states the date the first atomic bomb was dropped on Hiroshima, 6 August 1945. Written above both of these in black, gothic script, is a passage from the Second Epistle of Peter (2 Peter 3:10) combined with a passage from Isaiah (Isaiah 54:10). The first passage references an apocalyptic end to the earth, in which everything created by man is destroyed by fire. This theme is reflected in Schreiter's work by an effect in the glass that resembles burnt paper near the date of the Hiroshima tragedy. By contrast, the second passage offers hope, implying that God will remain merciful despite man's mistakes.

=== Organ ===
The organ was built by the G. F. Steinmeyer & Co. company in 1980. The construction was completed in 1993.

I Hauptwerk C–c^{4}
1.	Großgedeckt	16′
2.	Praestant I-II	8′
3.	Bourdon	8′
4.	Oktave	4′
5.	Rohrflöte	4′	(L)
6.	Quinte	2 2/3′	(L)
7.	Superoktave	2′
8.	Kornett II-V	2 2/3′
9.	Mixtur V-VI	1 1/3′	(L)
10.	Zundel III	1/3′	(L)
11.	Trompete	16′
12.	Trompete	8′
13.	Bärpfeife	8′

II Positiv C–c^{4}
14.	Suavial	8′	(L)
15.	Rohrgedeckt	8′
16.	Viola da Gamba	8′	(L)
17.	Quintade	8′	(L)
18.	Italienisches Prinzipal	4′
19.	Spillflöte	4′
20.	Oktave	2′
21.	Waldflöte	2′
22.	Larigot	1 1/3′
23.	Sifflöte	1′
24.	Scharff IV	2/3′
25.	Hültze Glechter (Note: Xylophon, (F–)f–c^{2})	2/3′
26.	Dulzian	16′
27.	Cromorne	8′
28.	Regal	8′
	Tremulant (Note: freely adjustable)

III Schwellwerk C–c^{4}
29.	Pommer	16′
30.	Schwellprinzipal	8′
31.	Gedackt	8′
32.	Salicional	8′
33.	Vox celestis	8′
34.	Oktave	4′
35.	Traversflöte	4′	(L)
36.	Nasat	2 2/3′
37.	Schweizerpfeife	2′
38.	Terz	1 3/5′
39.	Septnone II	1 1/7′
40.	Scharfmixtur V	1′
41.	Bombarde	16′
42.	Trompette harmonique	8′
43.	Spanische Trompete	8′
44.	Hautbois	8′	(L)
	Tremulant
	Röhrenglocken

Pedal C–g^{1}
46.	Untersatz	32′	(L)
47.	Prinzipal	16′
48.	Subbass	16′
49.	Großquinte	10 2/3′
50.	Oktavbass	8′
51.	Salicetbass	8′
52.	Tenoroktav	4′
53.	Spitzflöte	4′
54.	Nachthorn	2′
55.	Rauschquinte II	6 2/3′	(L)
56.	Hintersatz IV	2 2/3′	(L)
57.	Obertöne III	3 1/5′	(L)
58.	Posaune	16′
59.	Trompete	8′
60.	Zink	4′
61.	Clarine	2′
	Röhrenglocken (Note: Transmission from III)

- Couplers:
  - Normalkoppeln: II/I, III/I, III/II, I/P, II/P, III/P
  - Superoktavkoppeln: III/I, III/II, II/P
  - Suboktavkoppeln: III/I, III/II
- Effect register: Hültze Glechter (Xylophon), Röhrenglockenspiel, two Zimbelsterne
- Registration system: 256 electronic combinations

Notes on organ building

(L) = Tuned by Orgelbau Lenter in 1997

== Notable burials ==
Originally, the Church of the Holy Spirit contained the tombs of the Palatinate electors, which were later destroyed by fire during the War of the Palatine Succession. The only remaining tomb is that of Prince-Elector Rupert III, the founder of the church, which is still preserved.

- Dorothea of Denmark, Electress Palatine (1520–1580)
- Eberhard II, Duke of Württemberg (1447–1504)
- Elisabeth of Nuremberg (1358–1411)
- Louis III, Elector Palatine (1378–1436)
- Louis IV, Elector Palatine (1424–1449)
- Rupert, King of the Romans (1352–1410)
- Wolfgang of the Palatinate (1494–1558)

== Gallery ==
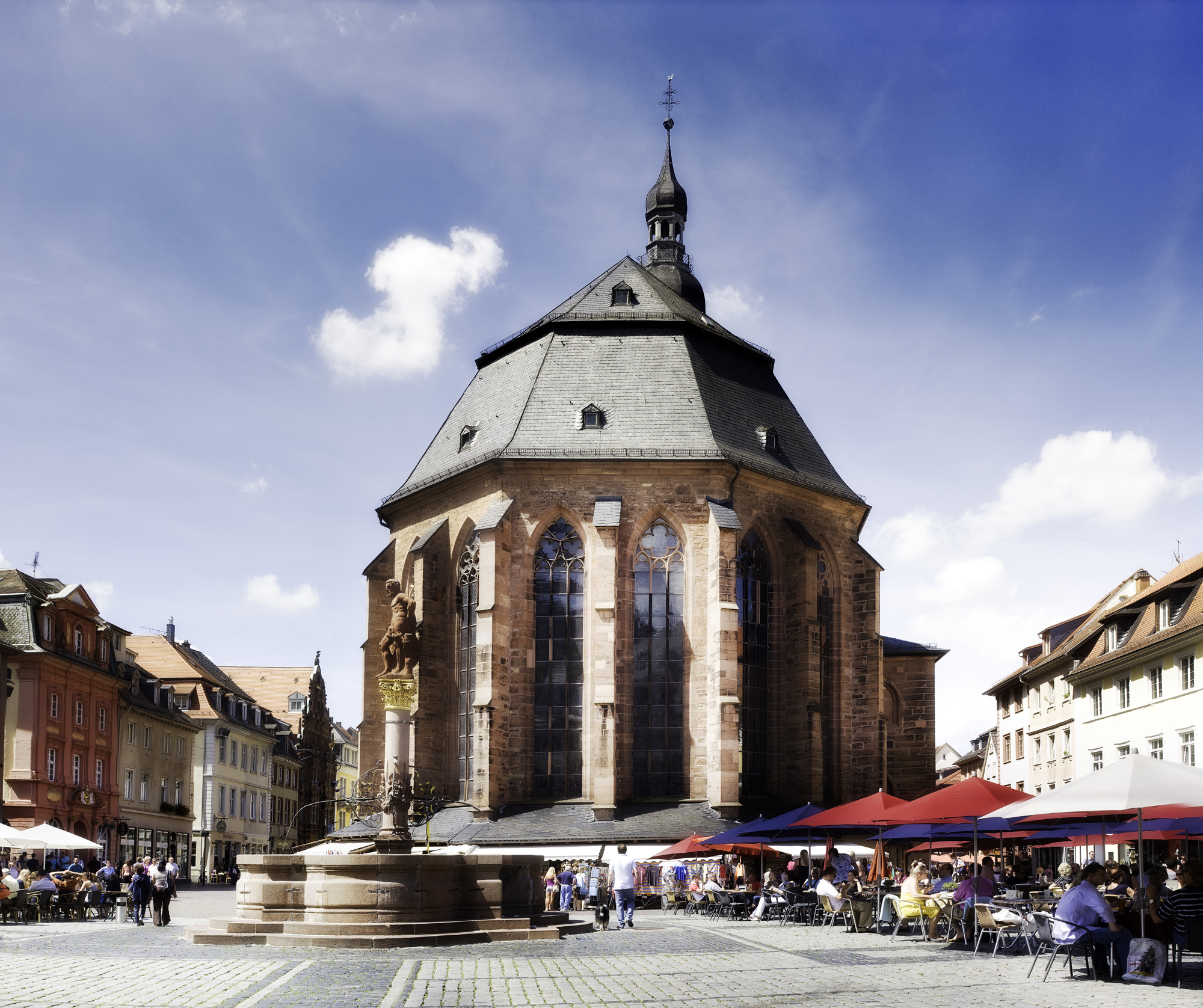
The apsidal end with fountain, surrounded by bookstalls and cafés

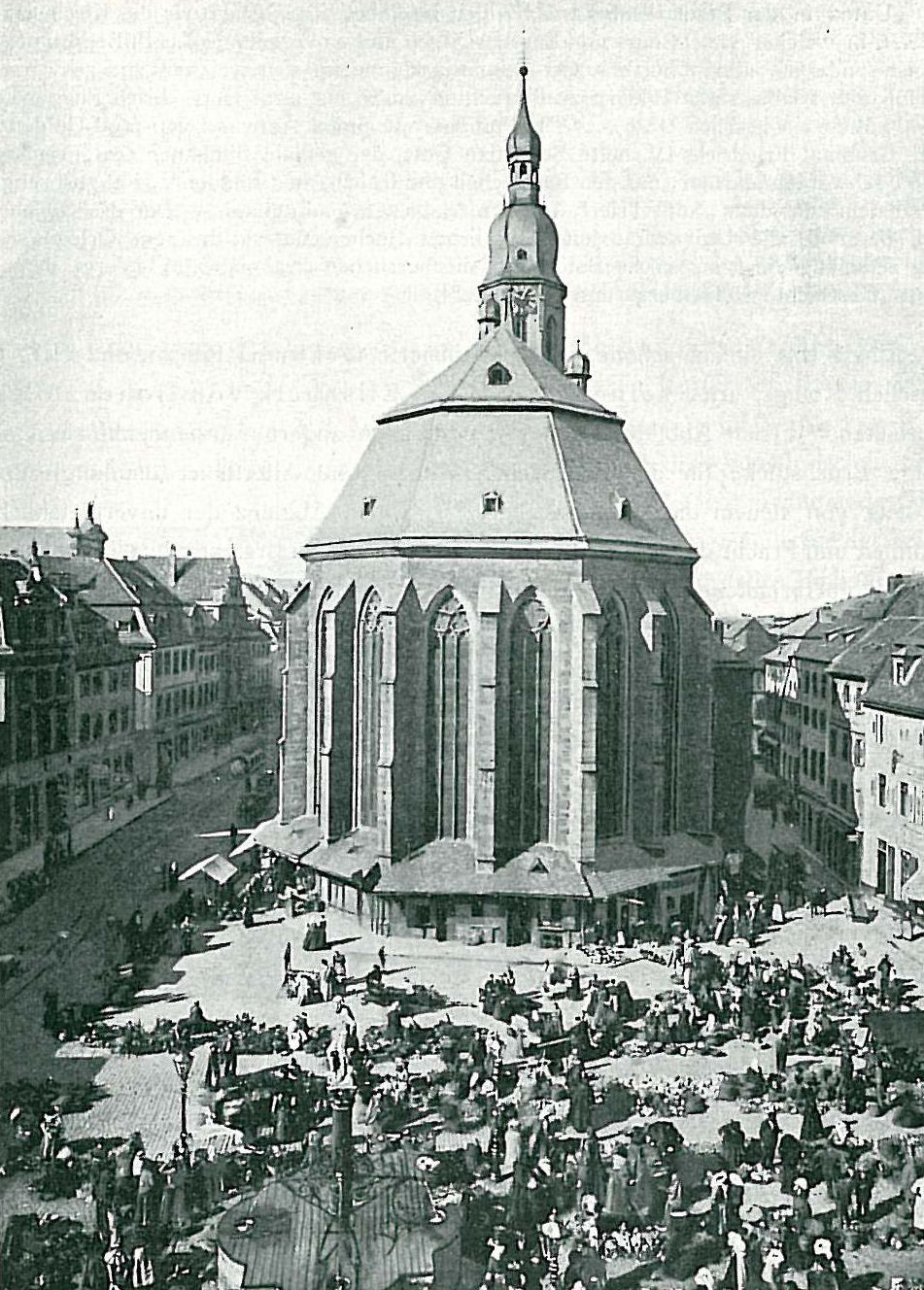
The exterior of the church and the city's central square, c. 1896

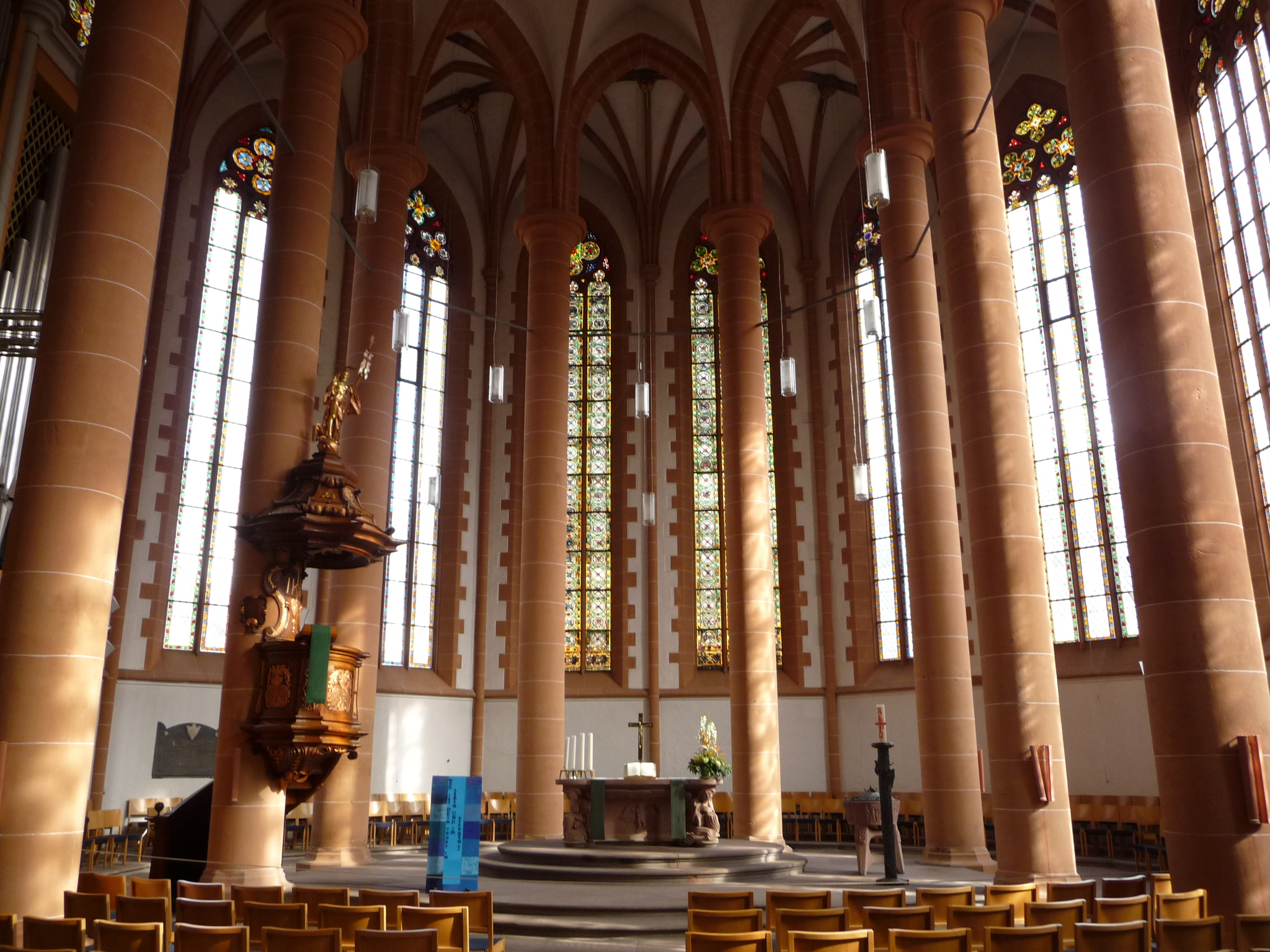
View of the choir

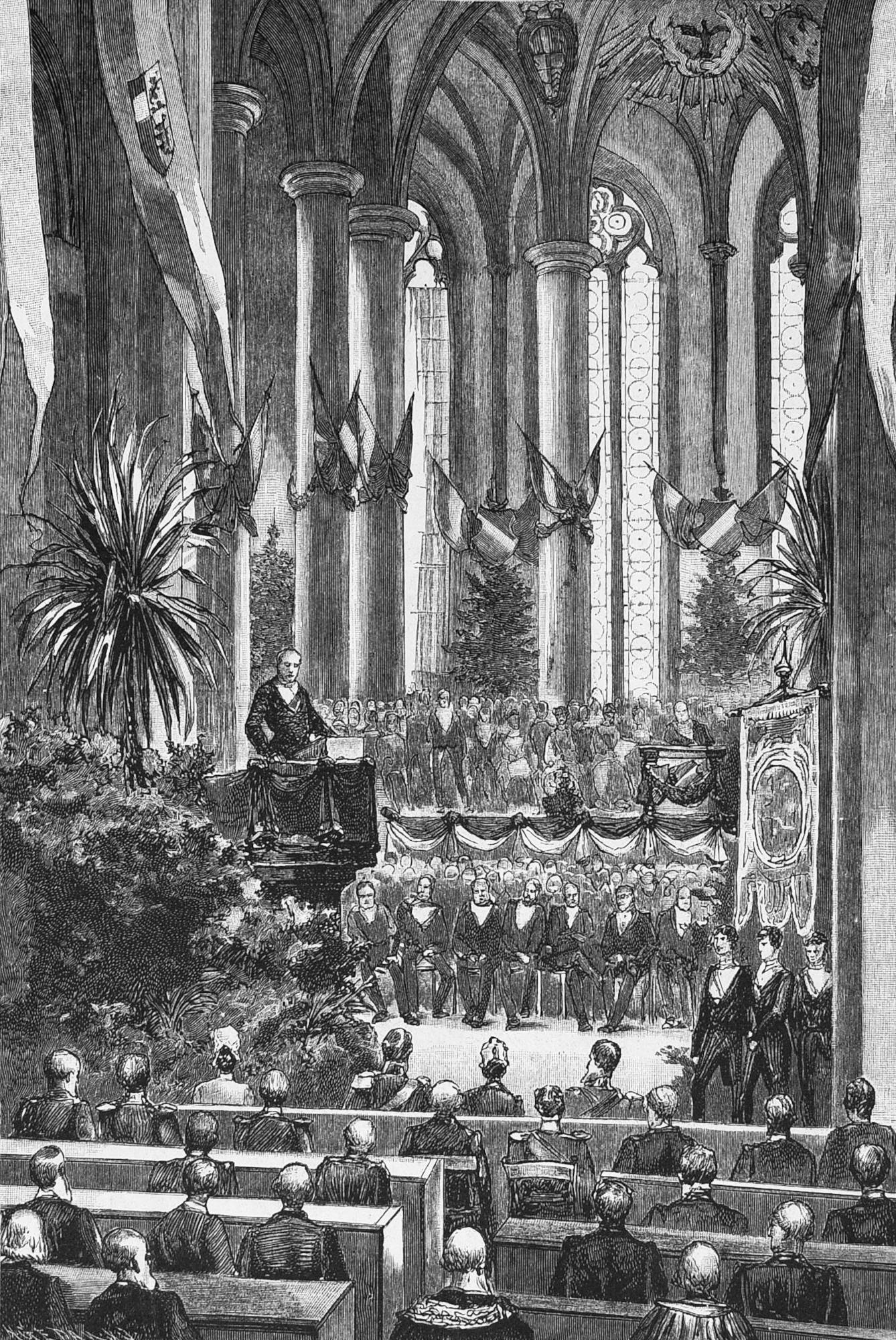
"Ceremonial speech by Professor Kuno Fischer in the Heiliggeistkirche", interior of the nave, 1886

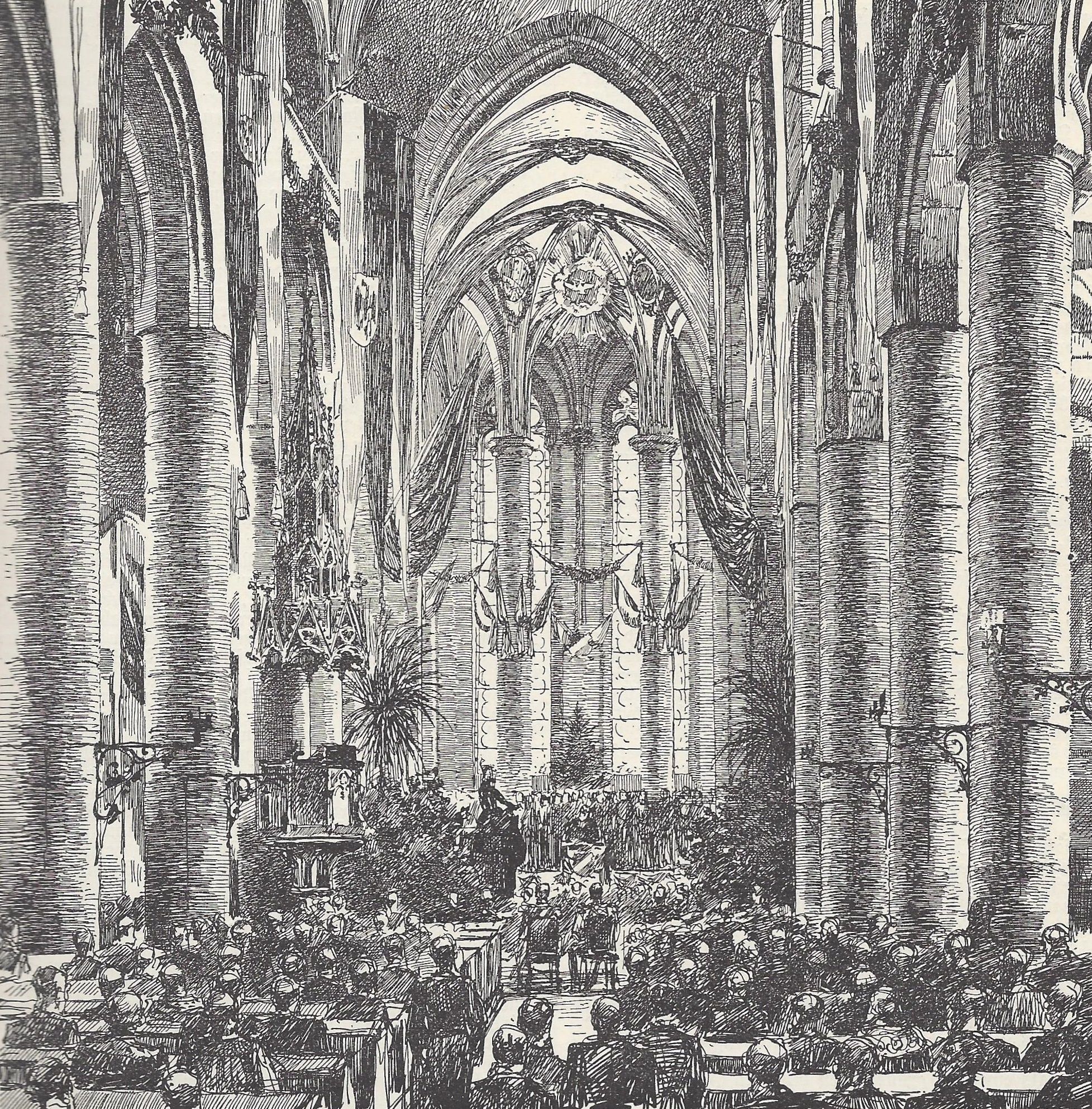
Drawing of a Heidelberg University ceremony, 1886

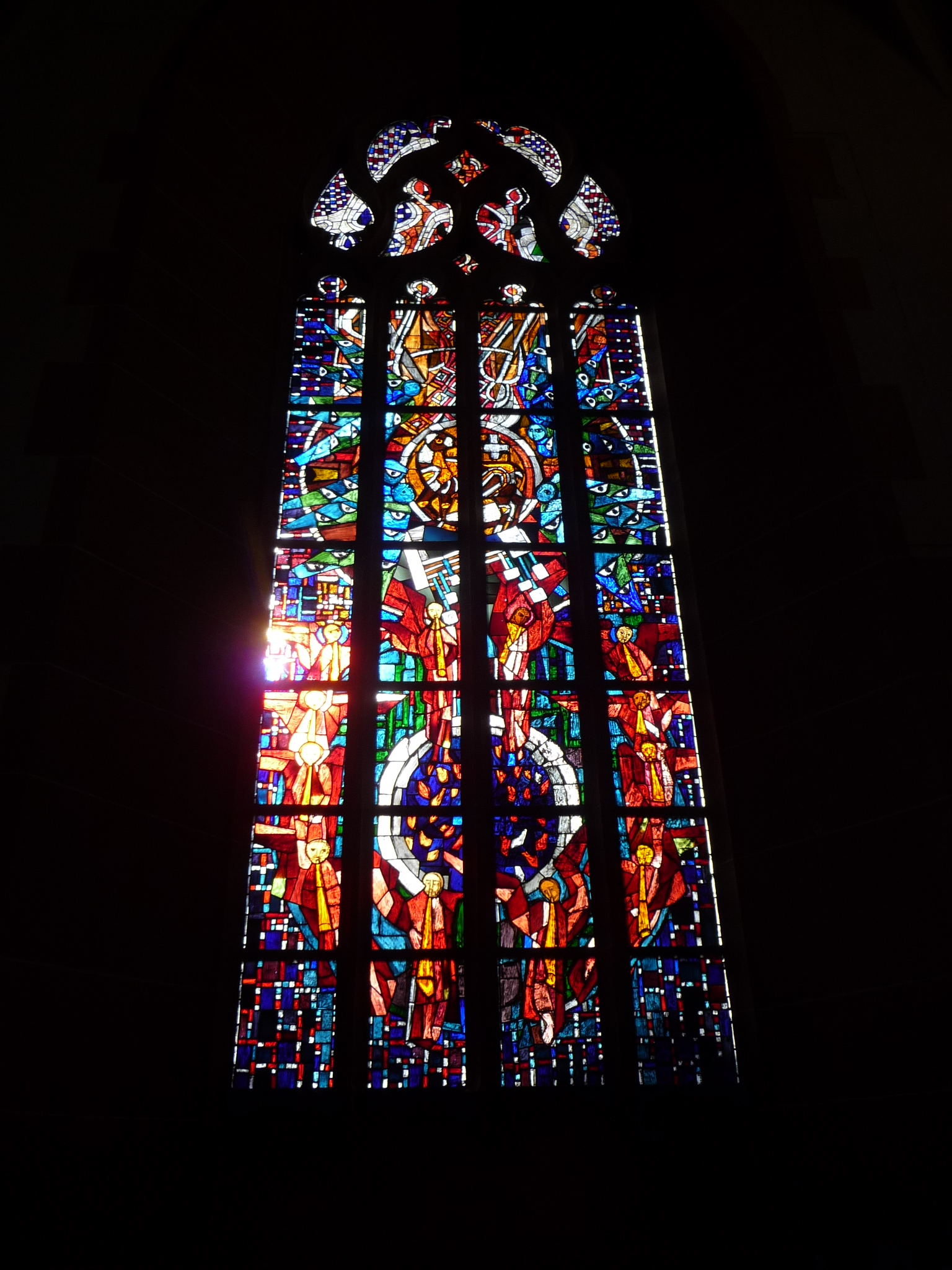
Contemporary stained glass window installation

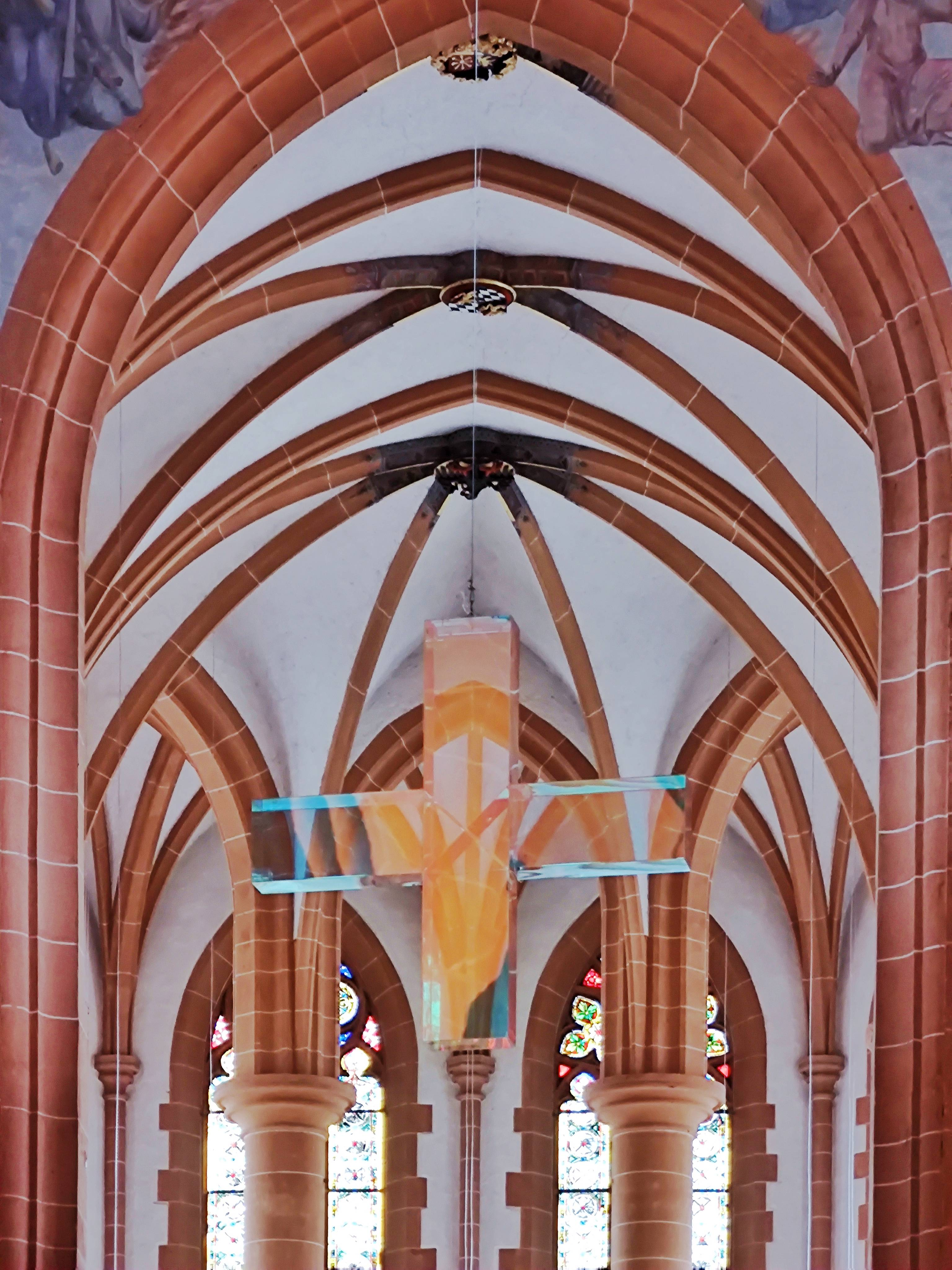
The transparent cross in the nave
