= Johann Christian Felix Baehr =

German classical philologist and librarian (1798–1872)

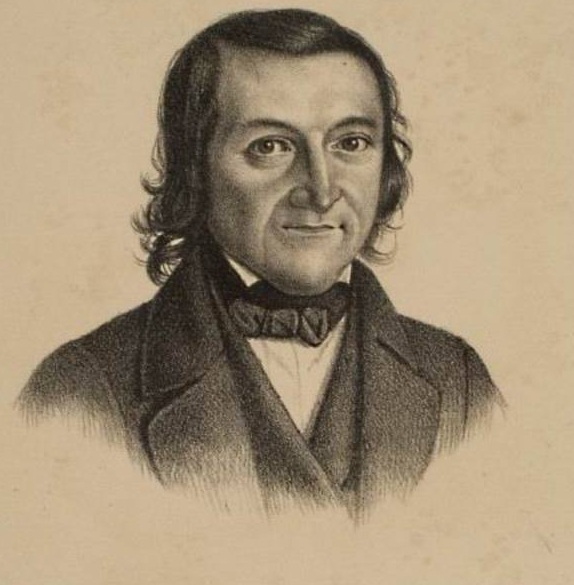
Johann Christian Felix Baehr (lithograph, 1843)

Johann Christian Felix Baehr or Bähr (June 13, 1798 – November 29, 1872) was a German philologist.

== Life ==
Born at Darmstadt, he studied at the Gymnasium and the University of Heidelberg, where he was appointed professor of classical philology in 1823, chief librarian in 1832, and on the retirement of G. F. Creuzer, became director of the philological seminary. He died at Heidelberg.

His earliest works were editions of Plutarch's Alcibiades (1822), Philopoemen, Flamininus, Pyrrhus (1826), the fragments of Ctesias (1824), and Herodotus (1830–1835, 1855–1862). But most important of all were his works on Roman literature and humanistic studies in the Middle Ages: Geschichte der römischen Litteratur ("History of Roman Literature", 1828; 4th edition, 1868–1870), and the supplementary volumes:

- Die christlichen Dichter und Geschichtschreiber Roms ("Christian Poets and Historians of Rome", 2nd edition, 1872)
- Die christlich-römische Theologie ("Christian-Roman Theology", 1837)
- Geschichte der römischen Litteratur im karolingischen Zeitalter ("History of Roman Literature in the Carlovingian Period", 1840).
