= Eberhard III =

Eberhard III may refer to:

- Eberhard III, Count of Württemberg (died 1417)
- Eberhard III, Duke of Württemberg (1614–1674)

== See also ==
- Eberhard I (disambiguation)
- Eberhard II (disambiguation)
- Eberhard IV (disambiguation)
