= Eberhard III of Württemberg =

Count of Württemberg from 1392 to 1417

Eberhard III
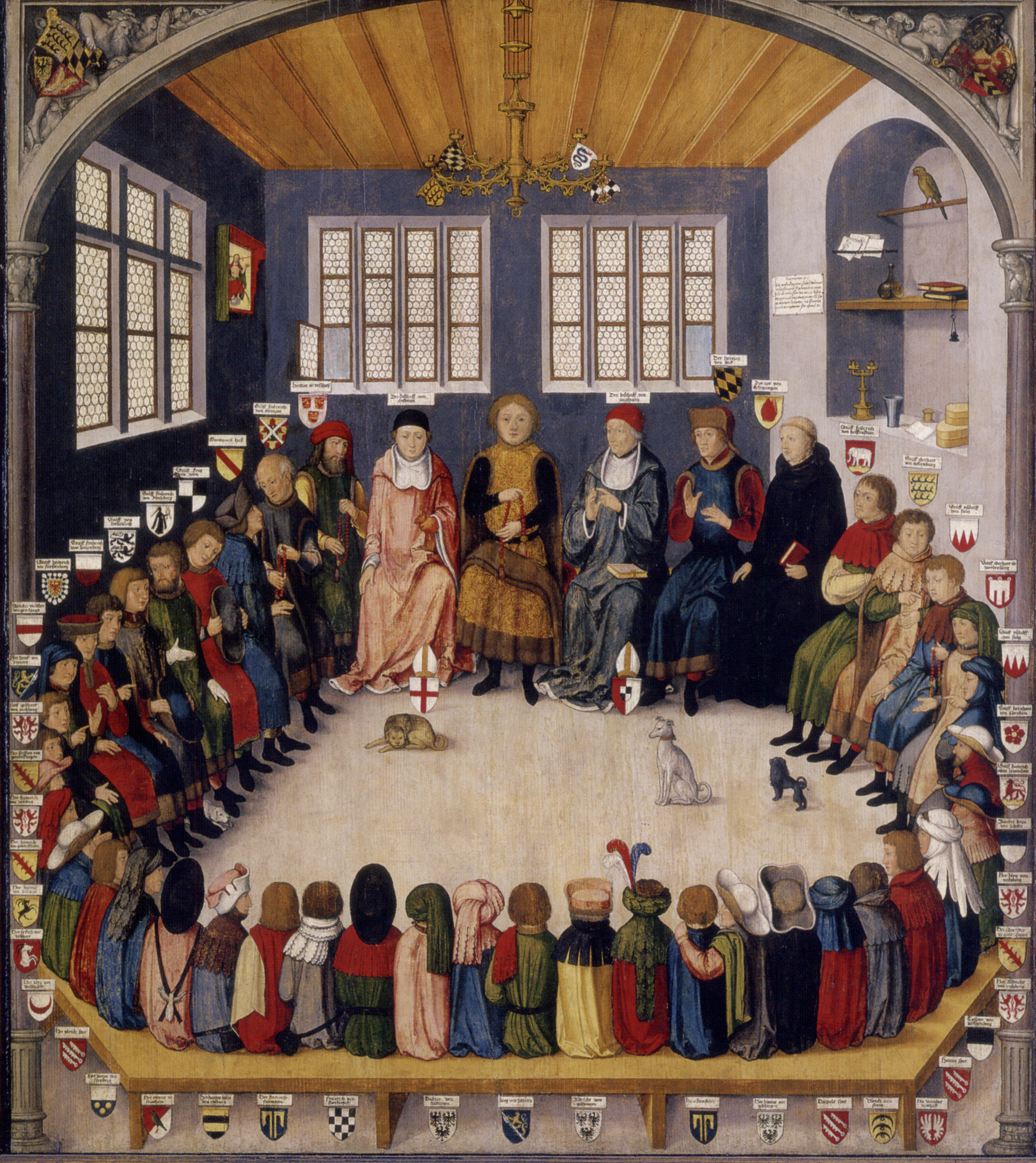
- Council meeting of Eberhard the Mild of Württemberg, 16th century

Count of Württemberg
- Reign: 15 March 1392 – 16 May 1417
- Predecessor: Eberhard II
- Successor: Eberhard IV
- Born: c. 1364
- Died: 16 May 1417 (aged 52–53); Göppingen, Württemberg
- Burial: Stiftskirche, Stuttgart
- Spouse: Antonia Visconti (m. 1380; died 1405) Elisabeth of Nuremberg (m. 1406)
- Issue: 4, including Eberhard IV and Elisabeth
- House: Württemberg
- Father: Ulrich of Württemberg
- Mother: Elisabeth of Bavaria

Eberhard III (c. 1364 – 16 May 1417), nicknamed the Mild (German: der Milde), was Count of Württemberg from 1392 until his death in 1417.

== Life ==
Eberhard was born in 1364, probably in Stuttgart, to Ulrich of Württemberg and Elisabeth of Bavaria, daughter of Emperor Louis IV. Ulrich, who was expected to inherit the County from his father, Eberhard II, was killed at the Battle of Döffingen during Württemberg's struggle with the Swabian League of Cities. Consequently, Eberhard succeeded upon his grandfather's death on 15 March 1392.

Eberhard's reign was noted by a peace-preserving policy of alliances with the neighboring principalities and imperial towns. Examples are an alliances with 14 Upper-Swabian towns, concluded 27 August 1395 and the Marbachs alliance in 1405. An important military success was the victory against the Schlegel-Gesellschaft in 1395 near Heimsheim.

Eberhard's most significant and long-lasting territorial acquisition was the County of Montbéliard in present-day Franche-Comté. On 13 November 1397, he concluded a marriage contract for his son Eberhard IV and Henriette, Countess of Montbéliard, granddaughter of Stephen of Montfaucon. Eberhard ruled Montbéliard until 1409, when he delegated authority to his son.

Eberhard died in Göppingen on 16 May 1417 and was buried in the Stiftskirche of Stuttgart.

== Marriages and children ==
In 1380, Eberhard married his first wife, Antonia Visconti, daughter of Bernabò Visconti, in Urach. Her dowry, agreed upon at Milan on 1 July 1380, was 70,000 guilders, which included expensive garments, musical instruments, and books. They had three children together, including Eberhard IV, who succeeded his father as count.

Antonia died in 1405, and Eberhard subsequently married Elisabeth of Nuremberg (died 1429), daughter of John III, Burgrave of Nuremberg, on 29 March 1406. Their marriage produced one daughter, Elisabeth, who later married Count John IV of Werdenberg.

== See also ==
- History of Baden-Württemberg

Eberhard III of Württemberg House of Württemberg Born: c. 1364 Died: 16 May 1417
German nobility
Preceded by Eberhard II	Count of Württemberg; 1392–1417	Succeeded by Eberhard IV
Preceded by Stephen of Montfaucon	Ruler of Mömpelgard; 1397–1409	Succeeded by Eberhard IV
