= Eberhard IV =

Eberhard IV may refer to:

- Eberhard IV of Berg, also Eberhard I, Count of Berg-Altena (1140–1180)
- Eberhard IV, Count of Württemberg (died 1419)
- Eberhard IV von Starhemberg (died 1429), archbishop of Salzburg

== See also ==
- Eberhard I
- Eberhard II
- Eberhard III
