= Ulrich I of Württemberg =

Ulrich I of Württemberg may refer to:

- Ulrich I, Count of Württemberg, Count of Württemberg in 1241-1265
- Ulrich, Duke of Württemberg, Duke of Württemberg in 1498-1519
