= Eberhard I of Württemberg =

Eberhard I of Württemberg may refer to:

- Eberhard I, Count of Württemberg
- Eberhard I, Duke of Württemberg
