= History of Baden-Württemberg =

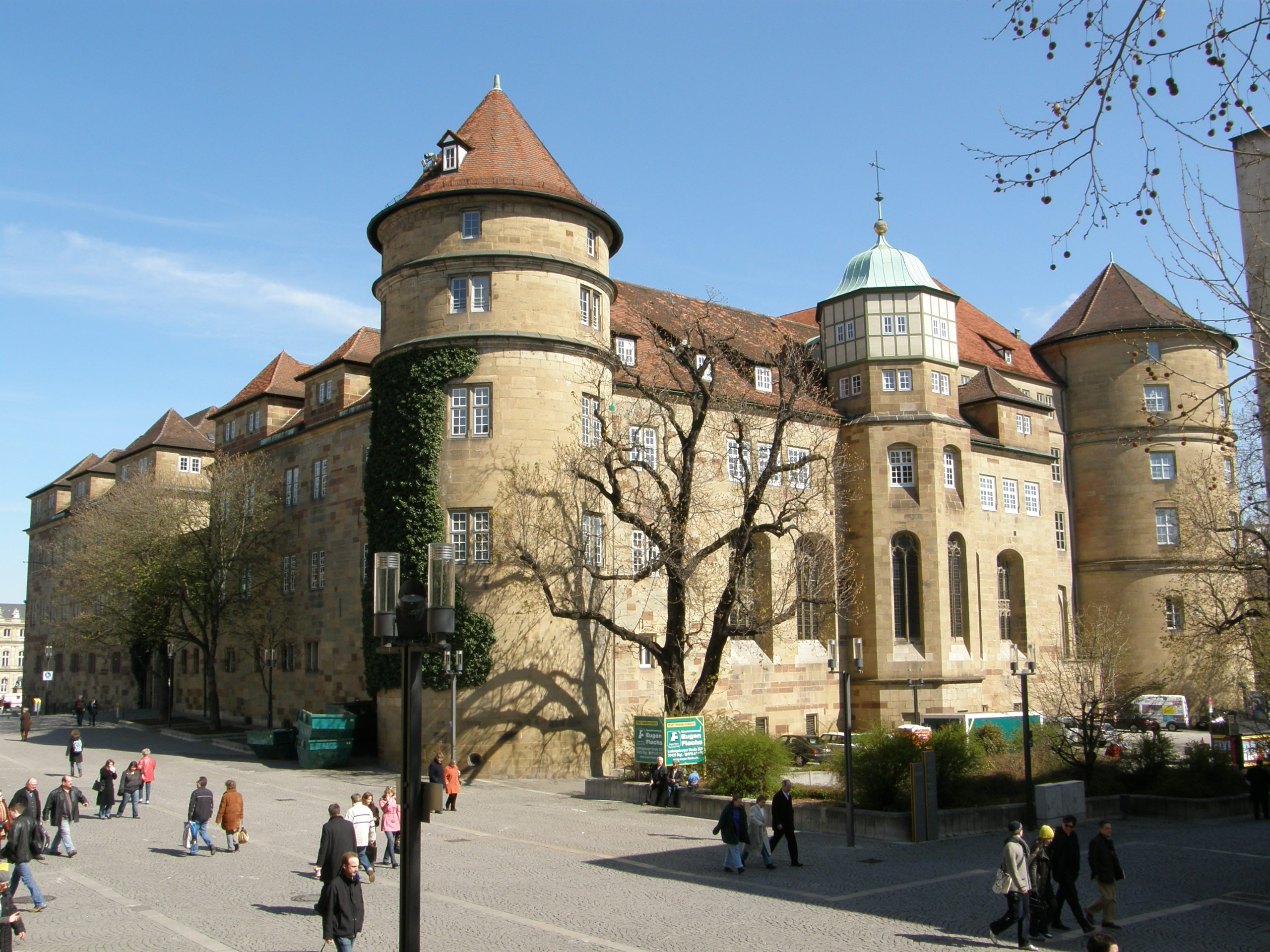
Old Castle (Stuttgart)

The history of Baden-Württemberg covers the area included in the historical state of Baden, the former Prussian Hohenzollern, and Württemberg, part of the region of Swabia since the 9th century.

In the 1st century AD, Württemberg was occupied by the Romans, who defended their control of the territory by constructing a limes (fortified boundary zone). Early in the 3rd century, the Alemanni drove the Romans beyond the Rhine and the Danube, but they in turn succumbed to the Franks under Clovis I, the decisive battle taking place in 496. The area later became part of the Holy Roman Empire.

The history of Baden as a state began in the 12th century, as a fief of the Holy Roman Empire. As a fairly inconsequential margraviate that was divided between various branches of the ruling family for much of its history, it gained both status and territory during the Napoleonic era, when it was also raised to the status of grand duchy. In 1871, it became one of the founder states of the German Empire. The monarchy came to an end with the end of the First World War, but Baden itself continued in existence as a state of Germany until the end of the Second World War.

Württemberg, often spelled "Wirtemberg" or "Wurtemberg" in English, developed as a political entity in southwest Germany, with the core established around Stuttgart by Count Conrad (died 1110). His descendants expanded Württemberg while surviving Germany's religious wars, changes in imperial policy, and invasions from France. The state had a basic parliamentary system that changed to absolutism in the 18th century. Recognised as a kingdom in 1806–1918, its territory now forms part of the modern German state of Baden-Württemberg, one of the 16 states of Germany, a relatively young federal state that has only existed since 1952. The coat of arms represents the state's several historical component parts, of which Baden and Württemberg are the most important.

== Celts, Romans and Alemani ==
The origin of the name "Württemberg" remains obscure. Scholars have universally rejected the once-popular derivation from "Wirth am Berg". Some authorities derive it from a proper name: "Wiruto" or "Wirtino," others from a Celtic place-name, "Virolunum" or "Verdunum". In any event, from serving as the name of a castle near the Stuttgart city district of Rotenberg, the name extended over the surrounding country and, as the lords of this district increased their possessions, so the name covered an ever-widening area, until it reached its present extent. Early forms included Wirtenberg, Wirtembenc and Wirtenberc. Wirtemberg was long accepted, and in the latter part of the 16th century Würtemberg and Wurttemberg appeared. In 1806, Württemberg became the official spelling, though Wurtemberg also appears frequently and occurs sometimes in official documents, and even on coins issued after that date.

Württemberg's first known inhabitants, the Celts, preceded the arrival of the Suebi. In the first century AD, the Romans conquered the land and defended their position there by constructing a rampart (limes). Early in the third century, the Alemanni drove the Romans beyond the Rhine and the Danube, but they in turn succumbed to the Franks under Clovis, the decisive battle taking place in 496. For about 400 years, the district was part of the Frankish empire and was administered by counts until it was subsumed in the ninth century by the German Duchy of Swabia.

== Duchy of Swabia ==
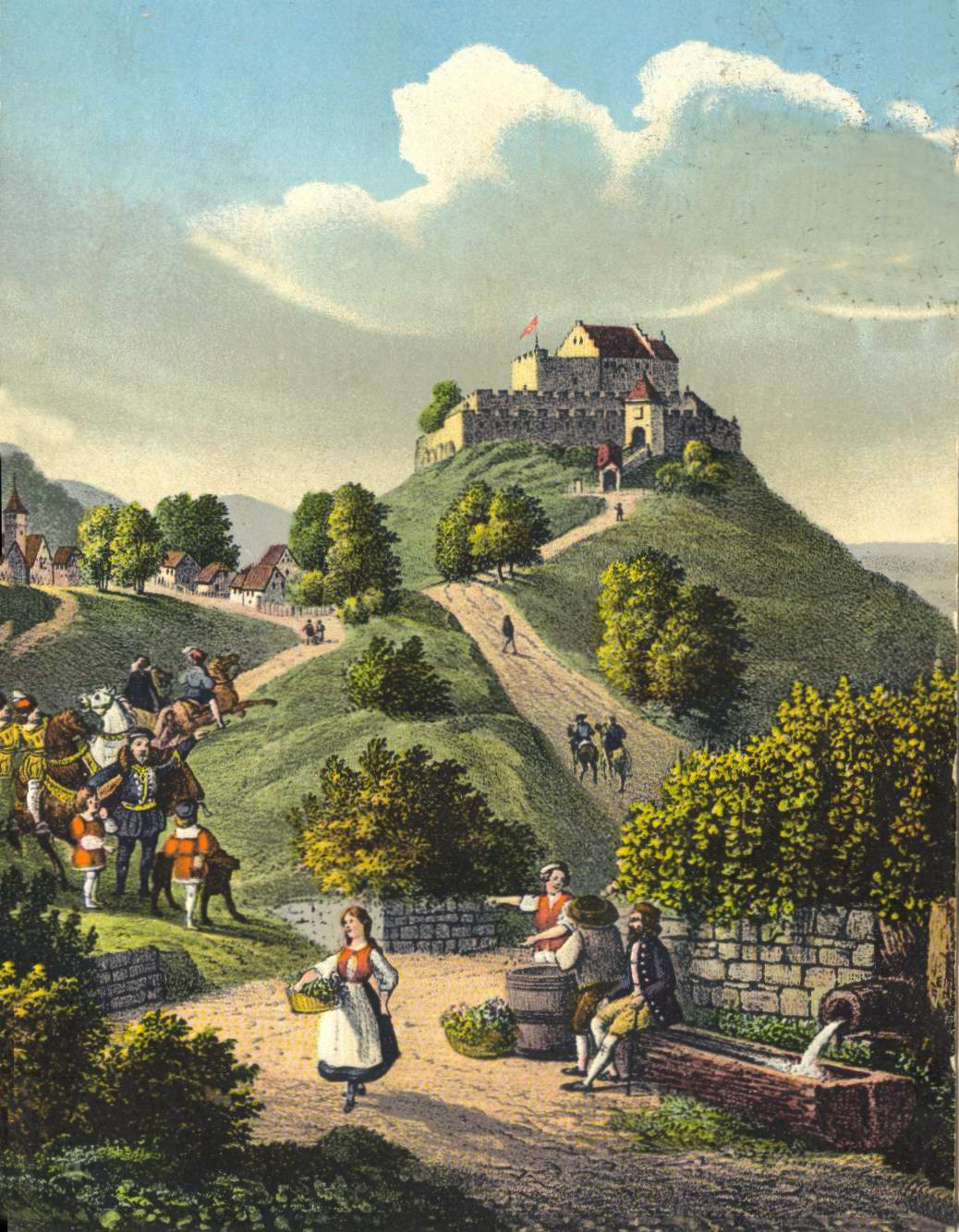
The former Württemberg Castle in an 18th-century print

The Duchy of Swabia is to a large degree comparable to the territory of the Alemanni. The Suevi (Sueben or Swabians) belonged to the tribe of the Alemanni, reshaped in the 3rd century. The name of Swabia is also derived from them. From the 9th century on, in place of the area designation "Alemania," came the name "Schwaben" (Swabia). Swabia was one of the five stem duchies of the medieval Kingdom of the East Franks, and its dukes were thus among the most powerful magnates of Germany. The most notable family to hold Swabia were the Hohenstaufen, who held it, with a brief interruption, from 1079 until 1268. For much of this period, the Hohenstaufen were also Holy Roman Emperors. With the death of Conradin, the last Hohenstaufen duke, the duchy itself disintegrated although King Rudolf I attempted to revive it for his Habsburg family in the late 13th century.

With the decline of East Francia power, the House of Zähringen appeared to be ready as the local successor of the power in southwestern Germany and in the northwest in the Kingdom of Burgundy-Arles. Duke Berthold V of Zähringen founded the city of Bern in 1191, which became one of the House of Zähringen power centers. East of the Jura Mountains and west of the Reuss was described as Upper Burgundy, and Bern was part of the Landgraviate of Burgundy, which was situated on both sides of the Aar, between Thun and Solothurn. However Berthold died without an heir in 1218 and Bern was declared a Free imperial city by Frederick II, Holy Roman Emperor. Berthold's death without heirs meant the complete disintegration of southwest Germany and led to the development of the Old Swiss Confederacy and the Duchy of Burgundy. Bern joined Switzerland in the year 1353.

Swabia takes its name from the tribe of the Suebi, and the name was often used interchangeably with Alemannia during the existence of the stem-duchy in the High Middle Ages. Even Alsace belonged to it. Swabia was otherwise of great importance in securing the pass route to Italy. After the fall of the Staufers there was never again a Duchy of Swabia. The Habsburgs and the Württembergers endeavored in vain to resurrect it.

== Hohenstaufen, Welf and Zähringen ==
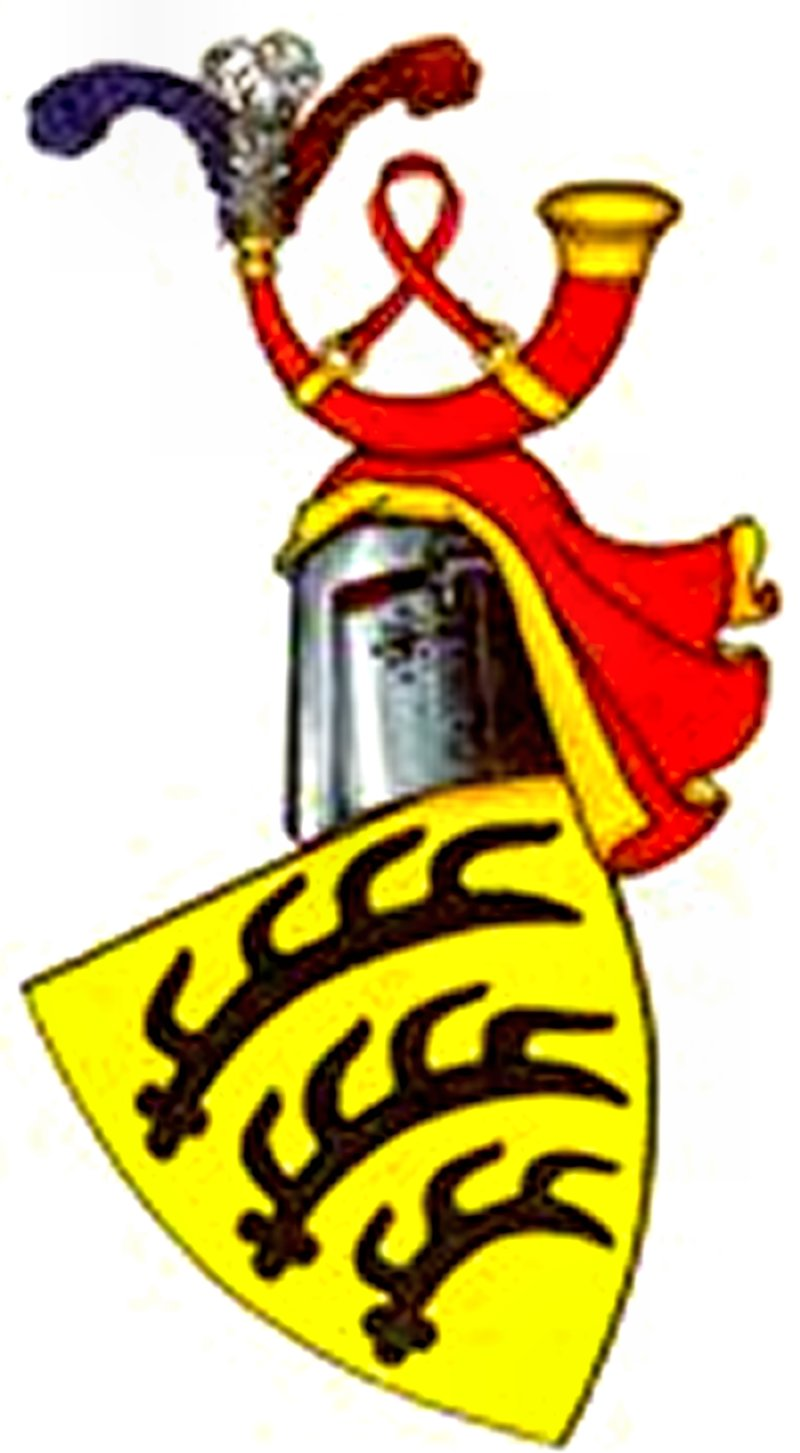
Arms of the counts of Württemberg

Three of the noble families of the southwest attained a special importance: the Hohenstaufen, the Welf and the Zähringen. The most successful appear from the view of that time to be the Hohenstaufen, who, as dukes of Swabia from 1079 and as Frankish kings and emperors from 1138 to 1268, attained the greatest influence in Swabia. To the Zähringer sphere of influence originally belonged Freiburg and Offenburg, Rottweil and Villingen, and, in modern Switzerland, Zürich and Bern. The three prominent noble families were in vigorous competition with one another, even though they were linked by kinship. The mother of the Stauffer King Friedrich Barbarossa (Red beard) was Judith Welfen. The Staufers, as well as the Zähringers, based their claims of rule on ties with the family of the Frankish kings from the House of Salier.

During the Middle Ages, various counts ruled the territory that now forms Baden, among whom the counts and duchy of Zähringen figure prominently. In 1112, Hermann, son of Hermann, Margrave of Verona (died 1074) and grandson of Duke Berthold II of Carinthia and the Count of Zähringen, having inherited some of the German estates of his family, called himself Margrave of Baden. The separate history of Baden dates from this time. Hermann appears to have called himself "margrave" rather than "count," because of the family connection to the margrave of Verona. His son and grandson, both called Hermann, added to their territories, which were then divided, and the lines of Baden-Baden and Baden-Hochberg were founded, the latter of which divided about a century later into Baden-Hochberg and Baden-Sausenberg. The family of Baden-Baden was very successful in increasing the area of its holdings.

The Hohenstaufen family controlled the duchy of Swabia until the death of Conradin in 1268, when a considerable part of its lands fell to the representative of a family first mentioned in about 1080, the count of Württemberg, Conrad von Beutelsbach, who took the name from his ancestral castle of Württemberg.

The earliest historical details of a Count of Württemberg relate to one Ulrich I, Count of Württemberg, who ruled from 1241 to 1265. He served as marshal of Swabia and advocate of the town of Ulm, had large possessions in the valleys of the Neckar and the Rems, and acquired Urach in 1260. Under his sons, Ulrich II and Eberhard I, and their successors, the power of the family grew steadily.

== Further Austria and the Palatinate ==
Other than the Margraviate of Baden and the Duchy of Württemberg, Further Austria and the Palatinate lay on the edge of the southwestern area. Further Austria (in German: Vorderösterreich or die Vorlande) was the collective name for the old possessions of the Habsburgs in south-western Germany (Swabia), the Alsace, and in Vorarlberg after the focus of the Habsburgs had moved to Austria.

Further Austria comprised the Sundgau (southern Alsace) and the Breisgau east of the Rhine (including Freiburg im Breisgau after 1386) and included some scattered territories throughout Swabia, the largest being the margravate Burgau in the area of Augsburg and Ulm. Some territories in Vorarlberg that belonged to the Habsburgs were also considered part of Further Austria. The original homelands of the Habsburgs, the Aargau and much of the other original Habsburg possessions south of the Rhine and Lake Constance were lost in the 14th century to the expanding Old Swiss Confederacy after the battles of Morgarten (1315) and Sempach (1386) and were never considered part of Further Austria, except the Fricktal, which remained a Habsburg property until 1805.

Further Austria was ruled by the Duke of Austria until 1379. After that, the regent of Further Austria was the Count of Tyrol.

The Palatinate arose as the County Palatine of the Rhine, a large feudal state lying on both banks of the Rhine, which seems to have come into existence in the 10th century. The territory fell to the Wittelsbach Dukes of Bavaria in the early 13th century, and during a later division of territory among the heirs of Duke Louis II of Upper Bavaria in 1294, the elder branch of the Wittelsbachs came into possession not only of the Rhenish Palatinate, but also of that part of Upper Bavaria itself which was north of the Danube, and which came to be called the Upper Palatinate (Oberpfalz), in contrast to the Lower Palatinate along the Rhine. In the Golden Bull of 1356, the Palatinate was made one of the secular electorates, and given the hereditary offices of Archsteward of the Empire and Imperial Vicar of the western half of Germany. From this time forth, the Count Palatine of the Rhine was usually known as the Elector Palatine.

Due to the practice of division of territories among different branches of the family, by the early 16th century junior lines of the Palatine Wittelsbachs came to rule in Simmern, Kaiserslautern, and Zweibrücken in the Lower Palatinate, and in Neuburg and Sulzbach in the Upper Palatinate. The Elector Palatine, now based in Heidelberg, converted to Lutheranism in the 1530s.

When the senior branch of the family died out in 1559, the Electorate passed to Frederick III of Simmern, a staunch Calvinist, and the Palatinate became one of the major centers of Calvinism in Europe, supporting Calvinist rebellions in both the Netherlands and France. Frederick III's grandson, Frederick IV, and his adviser, Christian of Anhalt, founded the Evangelical Union of Protestant states in 1608, and in 1619 Elector Frederick V (the son-in-law of King James I of England) accepted the throne of Bohemia from rebellious Protestant noblemen. He was soon defeated by the forces of Emperor Ferdinand II at the Battle of White Mountain in 1620, and Spanish and Bavarian troops soon occupied the Palatinate itself. In 1623, Frederick was put under the ban of the Empire, and his territories and Electoral dignity granted to the Duke (now Elector) of Bavaria, Maximilian I.

At the Treaty of Westphalia in 1648, the Sundgau became part of France, and in the 18th century, the Habsburgs acquired a few minor new territories in southern Germany such as Tettnang. In the Peace of Pressburg of 1805, Further Austria was dissolved and the formerly Habsburg territories were assigned to Bavaria, Baden, and Württemberg, and the Fricktal to Switzerland.

By the Peace of Westphalia in 1648, Frederick V's son, Charles Louis, was restored to the Lower Palatinate, and given a new electoral title, but the Upper Palatinate and the senior electoral title remained with the Bavarian line. In 1685, the Simmern line died out, and the Palatinate was inherited by the Count Palatine of Neuburg (who was also Duke of Jülich and Berg), a Catholic. The Neuburg line, which moved the capital to Mannheim, lasted until 1742, when it, too, became extinct, and the Palatinate was inherited by the Duke Karl Theodor of Sulzbach. The childless Karl Theodor also inherited Bavaria when its electoral line became extinct in 1777, and all the Wittelsbach lands save Zweibrücken on the French border (whose Duke was, in fact, Karl Theodor's presumptive heir) were now under a single ruler. The Palatinate was destroyed in the Wars of the French Revolution—first its left bank territories were occupied, and then annexed, by France starting in 1795, and then, in 1803, its right bank territories were taken by the Margrave of Baden. The provincial government in Alsace was alternately administered by the Palatinate (1408–1504, 1530–1558) and by the Habsburgs (13th and 14th centuries, 1504–1530). Only the margraves of Baden and the counts and dukes of Württemberg included both homelands within their territories. With the political reordering of the southwest after 1800, Further Austria and the Electorate Palatine disappeared from history.

== Baden and Württemberg before the Reformation ==
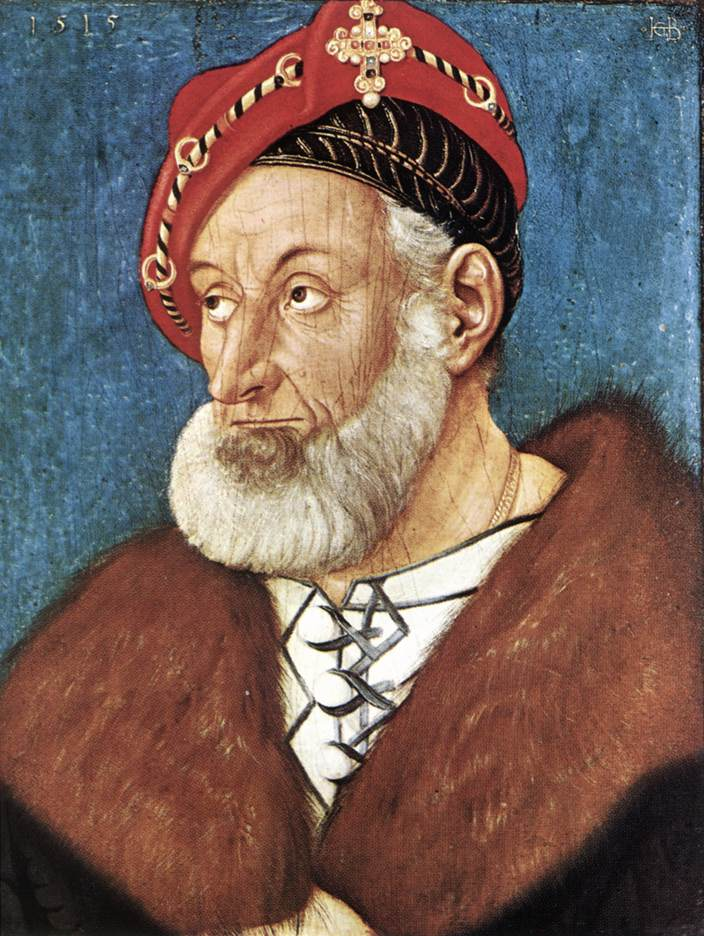
Christoph I of Baden, by Hans Baldung Grien, 1515

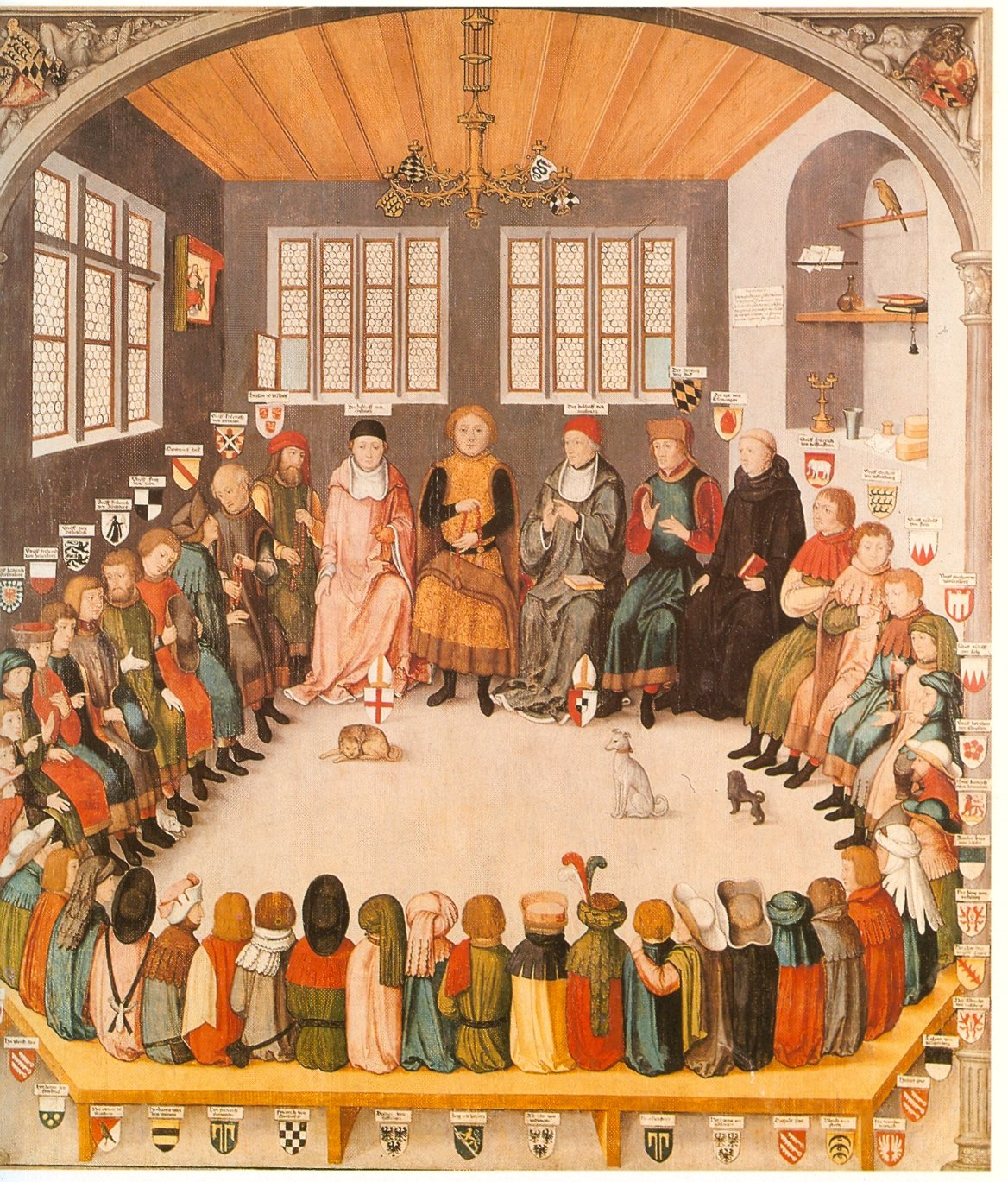
Eberhard III in Council

The family of Baden-Baden was very successful in increasing the area of its holdings, which after several divisions were united by the margrave Bernard I in 1391. Bernard, a soldier of some renown, continued the work of his predecessors and obtained other districts, including Baden-Hochberg, the ruling family of which died out in 1418.

During the 15th century, a war with the Count Palatine of the Rhine deprived the Margrave Charles I (died 1475) of a part of his territories, but these losses were more than recovered by his son and successor, Christoph I of Baden (illustration, right). In 1503, the family Baden-Sausenberg became extinct, and the whole of Baden was united by Christophe. In Baden, however, a partitioning occurred that lasted from 1515 to 1771. Moreover, the various parts of Baden were always physically separated one from the other.

The lords of Württemberg were first named in 1092. Supposedly a Lord of Virdeberg by Luxembourg had married an heiress of the lords of Beutelsbach. The new Wirtemberg Castle (castle chapel dedicated in 1083) was the central point of a rule that extended from the Neckar and Rems valleys in all directions over the centuries.

Eberhard I, Count of Württemberg opposed, sometimes successfully, three Holy Roman emperors. He doubled the area of his county and transferred his residence from Württemberg Castle to the "Old Castle" in today's city centre of Stuttgart.

His successors were not as prominent, but all added something to the land area of Württemberg. In 1381, the Duchy of Teck was bought, and marriage to an heiress added Montbéliard in 1397. The family divided its lands among collateral branches several times but, in 1482, the Treaty of Münsingen reunited the territory, declared it indivisible, and united it under Count Eberhard V, called im Bart (The Bearded). This arrangement received the sanction of the Holy Roman Emperor, Maximilian I, and of the Imperial Diet, in 1495.

Unusually for Germany, from 1457 Württemberg had a bicameral parliament, the Landtag, known otherwise as the "diet" or "Estates" of Württemberg, that had to approve new taxation.

In 1477, Eberhard V founded the University of Tübingen and expelled the Jews. At Eberhard's death in 1496, his cousin, Duke Eberhard II, succeeded for a short reign of two years, terminated by a deposition.

Eberhard V proved one of the most energetic rulers that Württemberg ever had, and, in 1495, his county became a duchy. Eberhard was now Duke Eberhard I of Württemberg. (Note: This type of sovereign royal duke was known in Germany as a Herzog.) Württemberg, after the partition from 1442 to 1482, had no further land partitions to endure and remained a relatively closed country.

== Reformation period ==
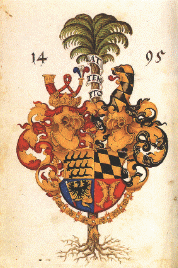
Württemberg coat of arms, 1495

Martin Luther's theses and his writings left no one in Germany untouched after 1517. In 1503, the family Baden-Sausenberg became extinct, and the whole of Baden was united by Christoph, who, before his death in 1527, divided it among his three sons. Religious differences increased the family's rivalry. During the period of the Reformation some of the rulers of Baden remained Catholic and some became Protestants. One of Christoph's sons died childless in 1533. In 1535, his remaining sons Bernard and Ernest, having shared their brother's territories, made a fresh division and founded the lines of Baden-Baden and Baden-Pforzheim, called Baden-Durlach after 1565. Further divisions followed, and the weakness caused by these partitions was accentuated by a rivalry between the two main branches of the family, culminating in open warfare.

The long reign (1498–1550) of Duke Ulrich, who succeeded to the duchy while still a child, proved a most eventful period for the country, and many traditions cluster round the name of this gifted, unscrupulous and ambitious man. Duke Ulrich of Württemberg had been living in his County of Mömpelgard since 1519. He had been exiled from his duchy by his own fault and controversial encroachments into non-Württembergish possessions. In Basel, Duke Ulrich came into contact with the Reformation.

Aided by Philip, landgrave of Hesse, and other Protestant princes, he fought a victorious battle against Ferdinand's troops at Lauffen in May 1534. Then, by the treaty of Cadan, he again became duke, but perforce duke of the duchy as an Austrian fief. He subsequently introduced the reformed religious doctrines, endowed Protestant churches and schools throughout his land, and founded the Tübinger Stift seminary in 1536. Ulrich's connection with the Schmalkaldic League led to another expulsion but, in 1547, Charles V reinstated him, albeit on somewhat onerous terms.

The total population during the 16th century was between 300,000 and 400,000. Ulrich's son and successor, Christoph (1515–1568), completed the work of converting his subjects to the reformed faith. He introduced a system of church government, the Grosse Kirchenordnung, which endured in part into the 20th century. In this reign, a standing commission started to superintend the finances, and the members of this body, all of whom belonged to the upper classes, gained considerable power in the state, mainly at the expense of the towns, by means of the Oberamture and later, in addition, the Landkreis.

Christopher's son Louis, the founder of the Collegium illustre in Tübingen, died childless in 1593. A kinsman, Frederick I (1557–1608) succeeded to the duchy. This energetic prince disregarded the limits placed on his authority by the rudimentary constitution. By paying a large sum of money, he induced the emperor Rudolph II in 1599 to free the duchy from the suzerainty of Austria. Austria still controlled large areas around the duchy, known as "Further Austria". Thus, once again, Württemberg became a direct fief of the empire, securing its independence. Even the Margraviate of Baden-Baden went over to Lutheranism that same year, but indeed only for a short time. Likewise, after the Peace of Augsburg the Reformation was carried out in the County of Hohenlohe. At the same time, however, the Counter-Reformation began. It was persistently supported by the Emperor and the clerical princes.

== Peasants' War ==
The living conditions of the peasants in the German southwest at the beginning of the 16th century were quite modest, but an increase in taxes and several bad harvests, with no improvement in sight, led to crisis. Under the sign of the sandal (Bundschuh), that is, the farmer's shoe that tied up with laces, rebellions broke out on the Upper Rhine, in the Bishopric of Speyer, in the Black Forest and in the upper Neckar valley at the end of the 15th century. The extortions by which he sought to raise money for his extravagant pleasures excited an uprising known as the arme Konrad (Poor Conrad), not unlike the rebellion in England led by Wat Tyler. The authorities soon restored order, and, in 1514, by the Treaty of Tübingen, the people undertook to pay the duke's debts in return for various political privileges, which in effect laid the foundation of the constitutional liberties of the country. A few years later, Ulrich quarrelled with the Swabian League, and its forces (helped by Duke William IV of Bavaria, angered by the treatment meted out by Ulrich to his wife Sabina, a Bavarian princess), invaded Württemberg, expelled the duke and sold his duchy to Charles V, Holy Roman Emperor, for 220,000 gulden.

Charles handed Württemberg over to his brother, the Holy Roman Emperor Ferdinand I, who served as nominal ruler for a few years. Soon, however, the discontent caused by the oppressive Austrian rule, the disturbances in Germany leading to the German Peasants' War and the commotions aroused by the Reformation gave Ulrich an opportunity to recover his duchy. Thus Marx Sittich of Hohenems went against the Hegenau and Klettgau rebels. On 4 November 1525 he struck down a last attempt by the peasants in that same countryside where the peasants' unrest had begun a year before. Emperor Karl V and even Pope Clement VII thanked the Swabian Union for its restraint in the Peasants' War.

== Thirty Years' War ==
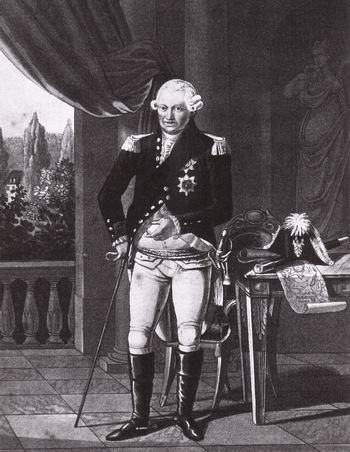
Duke Frederick II Eugene

The longest war in German history became, with the intervention of major powers, a global war. The cause was mainly the conflict of religious denominations as a result of the Reformation. Thus, in the southwest of the empire, Catholic and Protestant princes faced one another as enemies—the Catholics (Emperor, Bavaria) united in the League, and the Protestants (Electorate Palatine, Baden-Durlach, Württemberg) in the Union. Unlike his predecessor, the next duke, Johann Frederick (1582–1628), failed to become an absolute ruler, and perforce recognised the checks on his power. During his reign, which ended in July 1628, Württemberg suffered severely from the Thirty Years' War although the duke himself took no part in it. His son and successor Eberhard III (1628–1674), however, plunged into it as an ally of France and Sweden as soon as he came of age in 1633, but after the battle of Nordlingen in 1634, Imperial troops occupied the duchy and the duke himself went into exile for some years. The Peace of Westphalia restored him, but to a depopulated and impoverished country, and he spent his remaining years in efforts to repair the disasters of the lengthy war. Württemberg was a central battlefield of the war. Its population fell by 57% between 1634 and 1655, primarily because of death and disease, declining birthrates, and the mass migration of terrified peasants.

From 1584 to 1622, Baden-Baden was in the possession of one of the princes of Baden-Durlach. The house was similarly divided during the Thirty Years' War. Baden suffered severely during this struggle, and both branches of the family were exiled in turn. The Peace of Westphalia in 1648 restored the status quo, and the family rivalry gradually died out. For one part of the southwest, a peace of 150 years began. On the Middle Neckar, in the whole Upper Rhine area and especially in the Electorate Palatine, the wars waged by the French King Louis XIV from 1674 to 1714 caused further terrible destruction. The Kingdom of France penetrated through acquired possessions in Alsace to the Rhine border. Switzerland separated from the Holy Roman Empire.

== Swabian Circle until the French Revolution ==
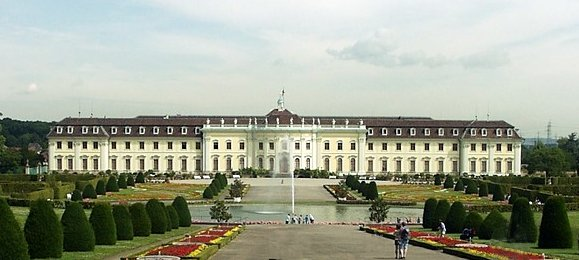
Ludwigsburg Palace and Baroque Gardens, near Stuttgart

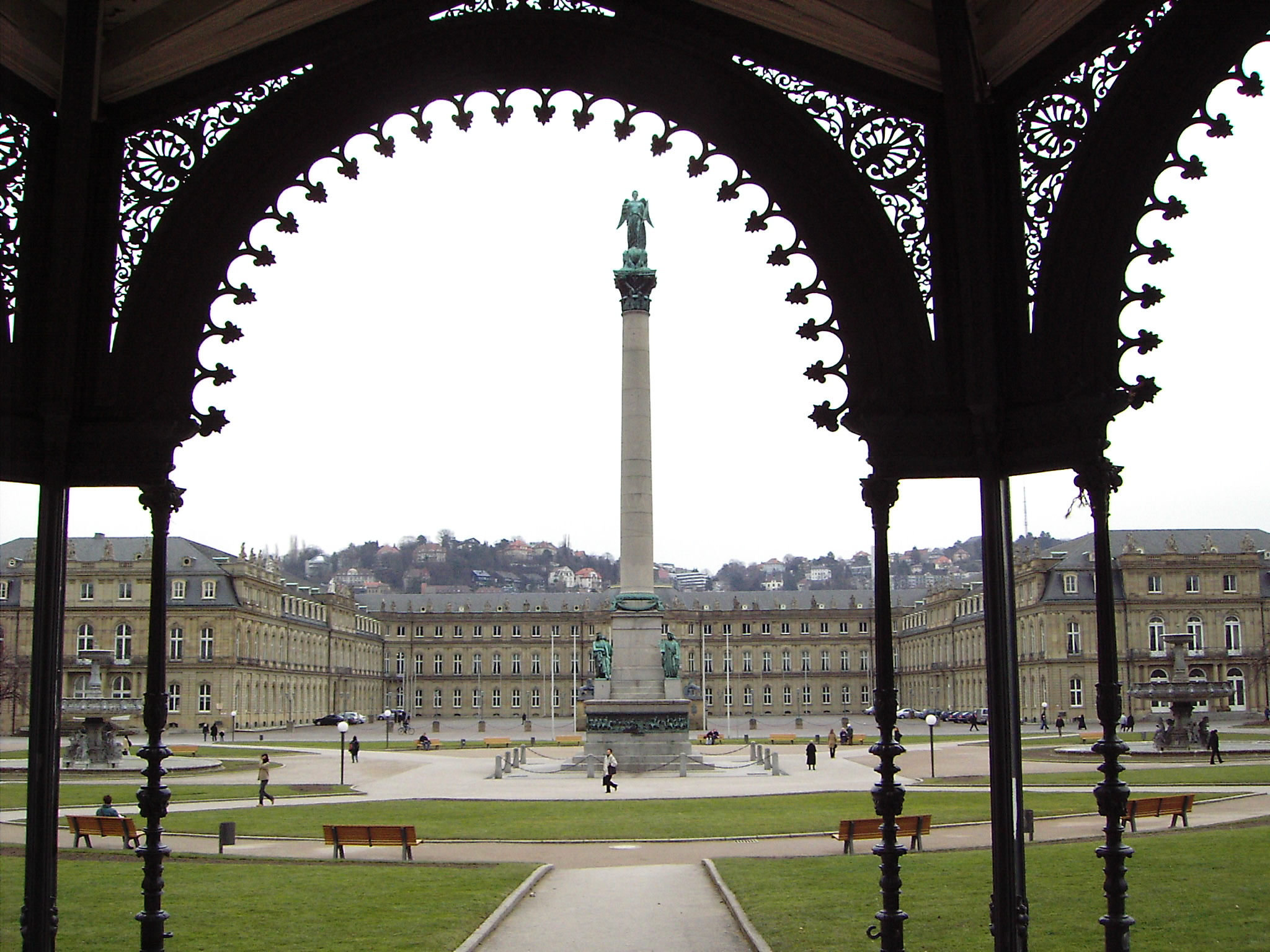
The New Castle, Stuttgart

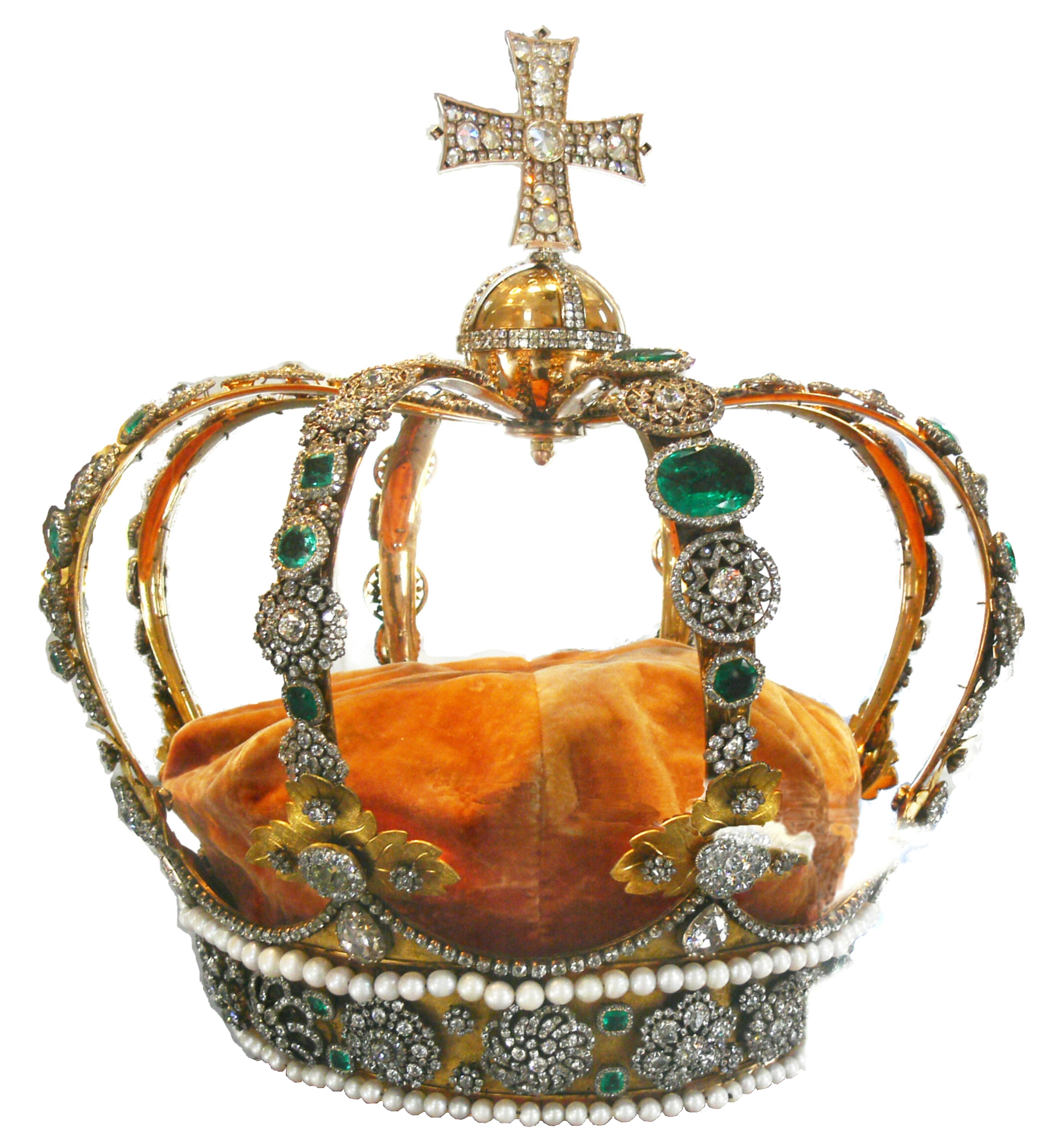
The royal crown of Württemberg

Flag of Württemberg

The duchy survived mainly because it was larger than its immediate neighbours. However, it was often under pressure during the Reformation from the Catholic Holy Roman Empire, and from repeated French invasions in the 17th and 18th centuries. Württemberg happened to be in the path of French and Austrian armies engaged in the long rivalry between the Bourbon and Habsburg dynasties.

During the wars of the reign of Louis XIV of France, the margravate was ravaged by French troops and the towns of Pforzheim, Durlach, and Baden were destroyed. Louis William, Margrave of Baden-Baden (died 1707), figured prominently among the soldiers who resisted the aggressions of France.

It was the life's work of Charles Frederick of Baden-Durlach to give territorial unity to his country. Beginning his reign in 1738, and coming of age in 1746, this prince is the most notable of the rulers of Baden. He was interested in the development of agriculture and commerce, sought to improve education and the administration of justice, and proved in general to be a wise and liberal ruler in the Age of Enlightenment.

In 1771, Augustus George of Baden-Baden died without sons, and his territories passed to Charles Frederick, who thus finally became ruler of the whole of Baden. Although Baden was united under a single ruler, the territory was not united in its customs and tolls, tax structure, laws or government. Baden did not form a compact territory. Rather, a number of separate districts lay on both banks of the upper Rhine. His opportunity for territorial aggrandisement came during the Napoleonic Wars.

During the reign of Eberhard Louis (1676–1733), who succeeded as a one-year-old when his father Duke William Louis died in 1677, Württemberg had to face another destructive enemy, Louis XIV of France. In 1688, 1703 and 1707, the French entered the duchy and inflicted brutalities and suffering upon the inhabitants. The sparsely populated country afforded a welcome to fugitive Waldenses, who did something to restore it to prosperity, but the extravagance of the duke, anxious to provide for the expensive tastes of his mistress, Christiana Wilhelmina von Grävenitz, undermined this benefit.

In 1704, Eberhard Ludwig started to build Ludwigsburg Palace to the north of Stuttgart, in imitation of Versailles.

Charles Alexander, who became duke in 1733, had become a Roman Catholic while an officer in the Austrian service. His favourite adviser was the Jew Joseph Süß Oppenheimer, and suspicions arose that master and servant were aiming at the suppression of the diet (the local parliament) and the introduction of Roman Catholicism. However, the sudden death of Charles Alexander in March 1737 put an abrupt end to any such plans, and the regent, Duke Carl Rudolf of Württemberg-Neuenstadt, had Oppenheimer hanged.

Charles Eugene (1728–1793), who came of age in 1744, appeared gifted, but proved to be vicious and extravagant, and he soon fell into the hands of unworthy favourites. He spent a great deal of money in building the "New Castle" in Stuttgart and elsewhere, and sided against Prussia during the Seven Years' War of 1756–1763, which was unpopular with his Protestant subjects. His whole reign featured dissension between ruler and ruled, the duke's irregular and arbitrary methods of raising money arousing great discontent. The intervention of the emperor and even of foreign powers ensued and, in 1770, a formal arrangement removed some of the grievances of the people. Charles Eugene did not keep his promises, but later, in his old age, he made a few further concessions.

Charles Eugene left no legitimate heirs, and was succeeded by his brother, Louis Eugene (died 1795), who was childless, and then by another brother, Frederick Eugene (died 1797). This latter prince, who had served in the army of Frederick the Great, to whom he was related by marriage, and then managed his family's estates around Montbéliard, educated his children in the Protestant faith as francophones. All of the subsequent Württemberg royal family were descended from him. Thus, when his son Frederick II became duke in 1797, Protestantism returned to the ducal household, and the royal house adhered to this faith thereafter. Nevertheless, the district legislatures as well as the imperial diets offered a possibility of regulating matters in dispute. Much was left over from the trials before the imperial courts, which often lasted decades.

== Southwest Germany up to 1918 ==
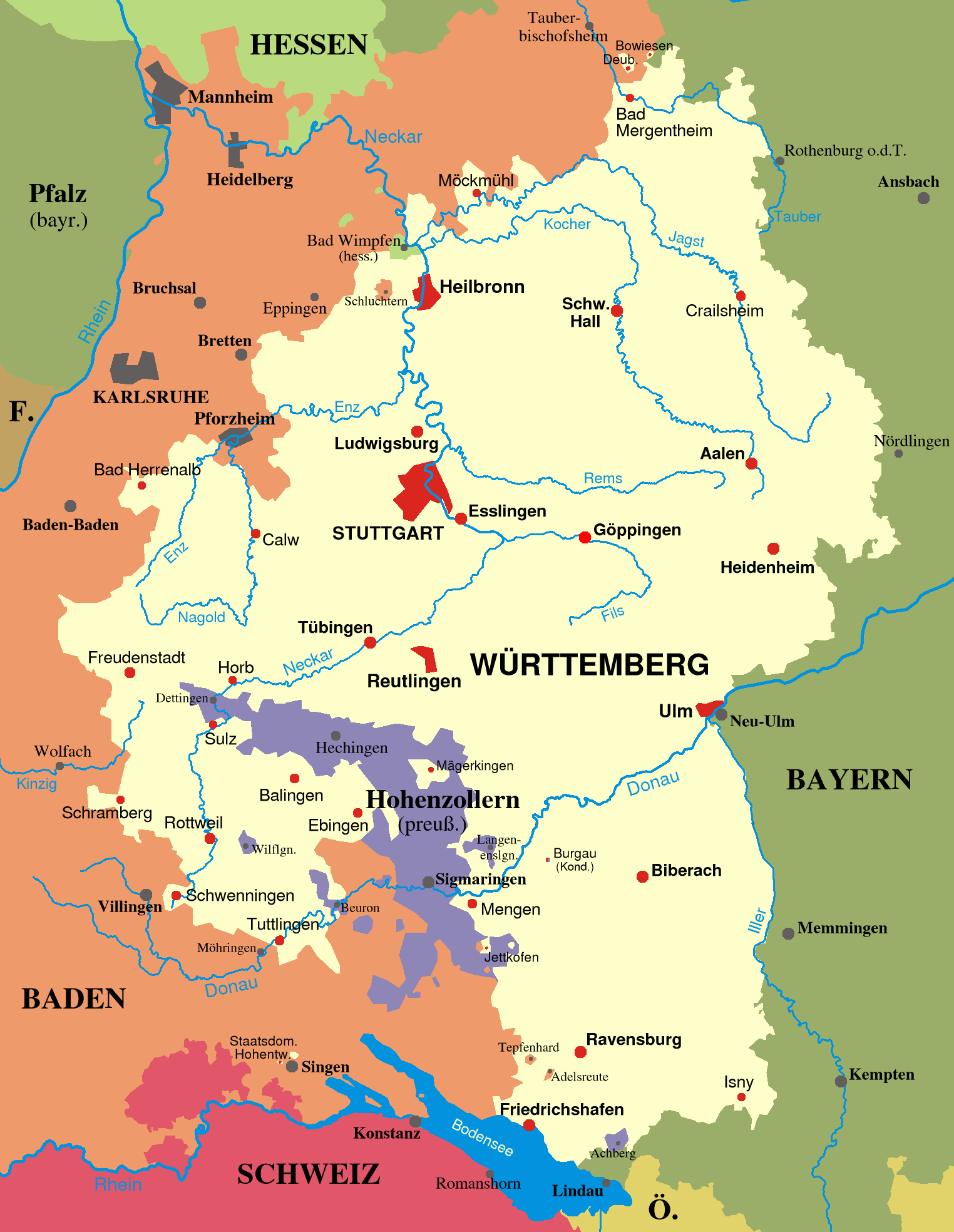
Kingdom of Württemberg as it existed from the end of the Napoleonic Wars to the end of World War I. From 1815 to 1866 it was a member state of the German Confederation and from 1871 to 1918 it was a federal state in the German Empire.

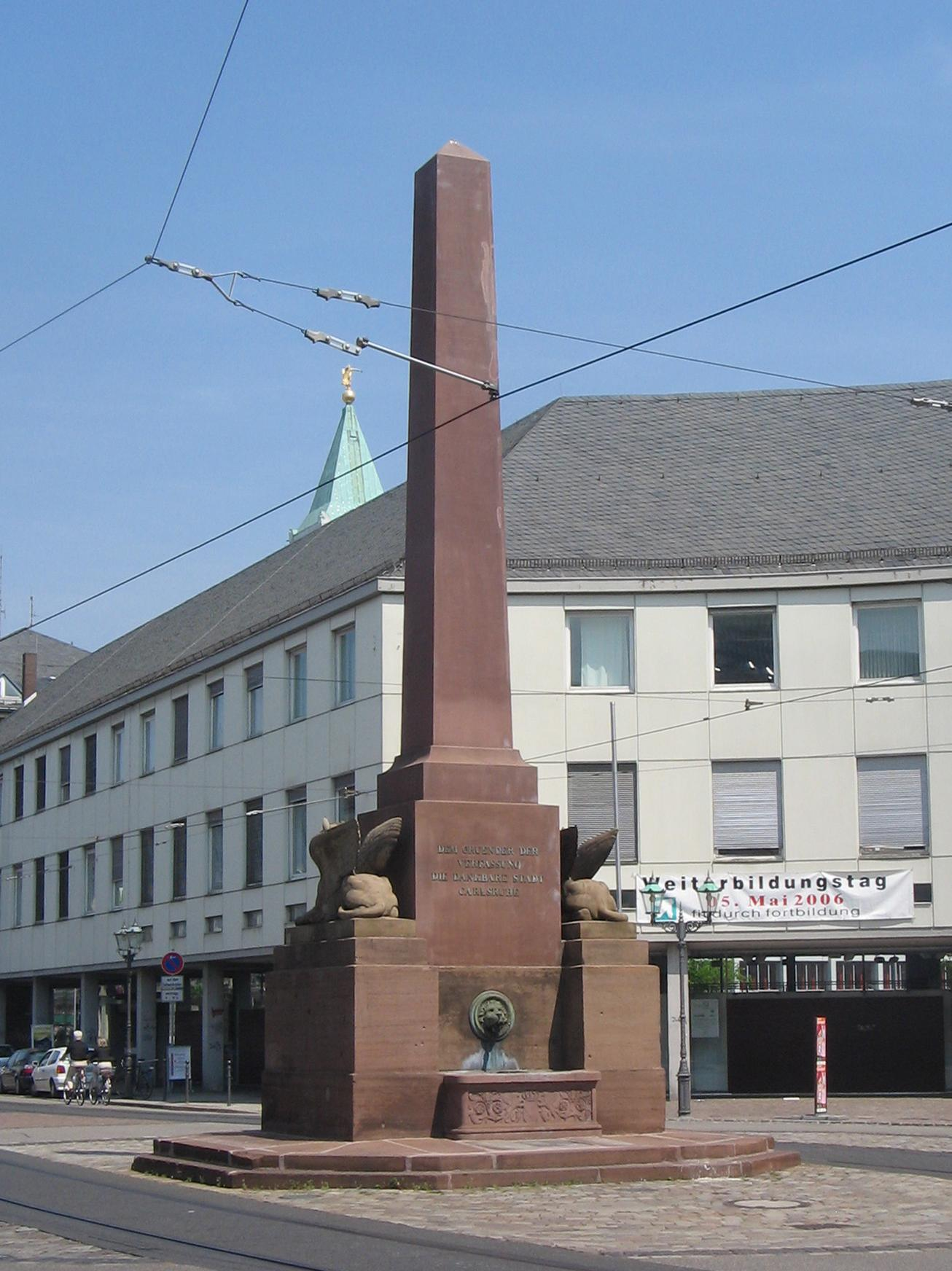
Monument to the Constitution of Baden (and the Grand Duke for granting it), in Rondellplatz, Karlsruhe, Germany

The Grand Duchy of Baden (Großherzogtum Baden) within Germany at the time of the German Empire

In the wars after the French Revolution in 1789, Napoleon, the emperor of the French, rose to be the ruler of the European continent. An enduring result of his policy was a new order of the southwestern German political world. When the French Revolution threatened to be exported throughout Europe in 1792, Baden joined forces against France. Its countryside was devastated in the ensuing battles. In 1796, the margrave was compelled to pay an indemnity and to cede his territories on the left bank of the Rhine to France. Fortune, however, soon returned to his side.

In 1803, largely owing to the good offices of Alexander I, emperor of Russia, the margrave received the Bishopric of Konstanz, part of the Rhenish Palatinate, and other smaller districts, together with the dignity of a prince-elector. Changing sides in 1805, he fought for Napoleon, with the result that, by the peace of Pressburg in that year, he obtained the Breisgau and other territories at the expense of the Habsburgs (see Further Austria). In 1806, the Baden margrave joined the Confederation of the Rhine, declared himself a sovereign prince, became a grand duke, and received additional territory.

On 1 January 1806, Duke Frederick II assumed the title of King Frederick I, abrogated the constitution, and united old and new Württemberg. Subsequently, he placed church lands under the control of the state and received some formerly self-governing areas under the "mediatisation" process. In 1806, he joined the Confederation of the Rhine and received further additions of territory containing 160,000 inhabitants. A little later, by the peace of Vienna in October 1809, about 110,000 more persons came under his rule.

In return for these favors, Frederick joined Napoleon Bonaparte in his campaigns against Prussia, Austria and Russia. Some 16,000 of his subjects marched as soldiers with the French invasion of Russia to take Moscow; only a few hundred survived to return. After the Battle of Leipzig in October 1813, King Frederick deserted the waning fortunes of the French emperor. By a treaty made with Metternich at Fulda in November 1813, he secured the confirmation of his royal title and of his recent acquisitions of territory. He directed his forces to fight with allies in their attack on France.

In 1815, the king joined the German Confederation, but the Congress of Vienna made no change in the extent of his lands. In the same year, he proposed a new constitution to the representatives of his people, but they rejected it. In the midst of this controversy, Frederick died on 30 October 1816.

The new king, William I (reigned 1816–1864), at once took up the constitutional question and, after much discussion, granted a new constitution in September 1819. This constitution, with subsequent modifications, remained in force until 1918 (see Württemberg). A period of quiet was established. The condition of the kingdom, its education, agriculture trade and manufactures, began to receive earnest attention. King William I helped to repair the shattered finances of the country. But the people's desire for greater political freedom did not fade away under the 1819 constitution. After 1830, a certain amount of unrest occurred. This, however, soon died. The inclusion of Württemberg in the German Zollverein and the construction of railways fostered trade.

The revolutionary movement of 1848 did not leave Württemberg untouched, although no associated violence took place within the kingdom. King William had to dismiss Johannes Schlayer (1792–1860) and his other ministers, calling to power men with more liberal ideas and the exponents of the idea of a united Germany. King William did proclaim a democratic constitution but, as soon as the movement had spent its force, he dismissed the liberal ministers. In October 1849, Schlayer and his associates returned to power. In Baden, by contrast, there was a serious uprising that had to be put down by force.

By interfering with popular electoral rights, the king and his ministers succeeded in assembling a servile diet in 1851, which surrendered all the privileges gained since 1848. In this way, the authorities restored the constitution of 1819, and power passed into the hands of a bureaucracy. A concordat with the Papacy proved almost the last act of William's long reign. But the diet repudiated the agreement, preferring to regulate relations between church and state in its own way.

In July 1864, Charles (1823–1891, reigned 1864–91) succeeded his father William I as king. Almost at once, he was faced with considerable difficulties. In the duel between Austria and Prussia for supremacy in Germany, William I had consistently taken the Austrian side. The new king and his advisers continued this policy.

In 1866, Württemberg took up arms on behalf of Austria in the Austro-Prussian War, but three weeks after the Battle of Königgrätz on 3 July 1866, her troops suffered a comprehensive defeat at Tauberbischofsheim, and the country lay at the mercy of Prussia. The Prussians occupied the northern part of Württemberg and negotiated a peace in August 1866. By this, Württemberg paid an indemnity of 8,000,000 gulden, but she at once concluded a secret offensive and defensive treaty with her conqueror. Württemberg was a party to the Saint Petersburg Declaration of 1868.

The end of the struggle against Prussia allowed a renewal of democratic agitation in Württemberg. This had not achieved any changes before the great war between France and Prussia broke out in 1870. Although the policy of Württemberg had continued to be antagonistic to Prussia, the kingdom shared in the national enthusiasm that swept over Germany, and its troops took a creditable part in the Battle of Wörth and in other operations of the war.

In 1871, Württemberg became a member of the new German Empire, but retained control of her own post office, telegraphs and railways. She had also certain special privileges with regard to taxation and the army and, for the next 10 years, Württemberg's policy enthusiastically supported the new order. Many important reforms, especially in the area of finance, ensued, but a proposal for a union of the railway system with that of the rest of Germany failed. After reductions in taxation in 1889, the reform of the constitution became the question of the hour. King Charles and his ministers wished to strengthen the conservative element in the chambers, but the laws of 1874, 1876 and 1879 only effected slight reforms pending a more thorough settlement. On 6 October 1891, King Charles died suddenly. His nephew, William II (1848–1921, reigned 1891–1918), succeeded and continued the policy of his predecessor.

Discussions on the reform of the constitution continued, and the election of 1895 memorably returned a powerful party of democrats. King William had no sons, nor had his only Protestant kinsman, Duke Nicholas (1833–1903). Consequently, the succession would ultimately pass to a Roman Catholic branch of the family, and this prospect raised certain difficulties about the relations between church and state. The heir to the throne in 1910 was the Roman Catholic Duke Albert (born 1865).

Between 1900 and 1910, the political history of Württemberg centred round the settlement of the constitutional and the educational questions. The constitution underwent revision in 1906, and a settlement of the education difficulty occurred in 1909. In 1904, the railway system integrated with that of the rest of Germany.

The population in 1905 was 2,302,179, of whom 69% were Protestant, 30% Catholic and 0.5% Jewish. Protestants largely preponderated in the Neckar district, and Roman Catholics in that of the Danube. In 1910, an estimated 506,061 people worked in the agricultural sector, 432,114 in industrial occupations and 100,109 in trade and commerce. (see Demographics of Württemberg)

In the confusion at the end of World War I, Frederick abdicated on 22 November 1918. A republic had already been declared on 14 November. Württemberg became a state (Land) in the new Weimar Republic. Baden named itself a "democratic republic," Württemberg a "free popular state." Instead of monarchs, state presidents were in charge. They were elected by the state legislatures, in Baden by an annual change, in Württemberg after each legislative election.

== German southwest up to World War II ==
Weimar-era Württemberg coat of arms

Politics between 1918 and 1919 towards a merger of Württemberg and Baden remained largely unsuccessful. After the excitements of the 1918–1919 revolution, its five election results between 1919 and 1932 show a decreasing vote for left-wing parties.

In the Reichstag election of 5 March 1933, about 86% of the people of Württemberg voted in the election with the Nazis winning 42% of their vote, up from the 26% of the vote that they had won in the last election of November 1932. On 8 March 1933, Adolf Hitler used his powers under the Reichstag fire degree' to appoint the local SA leader Dietrich von Jagow as the police commissioner for Württemberg. Jagow started what was called a "reign of terror" as he ruthlessly employed the SA and the police against Jews, Social Democrats and Communists. Jagow founded a concentration camp at Heuberg that held 1,902 people at its opening in March 1933 with the number rising to 15,000 by the time it was shut down in December 1933. The Württemberg Nazis were torn by a feud between the Gauleiter Wilhelm Murr and his archenemy the Minister President Christian Mergenthaler, and throughout the Nazi era, the local NSDAP was highly dysfunctional as Murr and Mergenthaler battled each other for control. After the seizure of power by the National Socialist German Workers Party (NSDAP) in the year 1933, the state borders initially remained unchanged. The state of Baden, the state of Württemberg and the Hohenzollern states (the government district of Sigmaringen) continued to exist, albeit with much less autonomy with regard to the Reich. From 1934, the Gau of Württemberg-Hohenzollern added the Province of Hohenzollern.

Though the Jewish population of Württemberg was small, Jewish traders played a significant role in linking the rural markets to the urban ones, and most farmers in Württemberg disapproved of the efforts of the Nazi regime to put the Jewish traders out of business, albeit only for self-interested reasons. The majority of the Jews living in urban areas tended to secular and assimilated into German culture while the majority of the Jews living in rural areas tended to be Orthodox and to keep a "certain reserve" from their Gentile neighbors. By 1939, the majority of the Jews who had lived in Württemberg had moved abroad with only a quarter of the Jews who had been living in 1933 in Württemberg were still there by 1939. The primary destination of the Jews of Württemberg was the United States through a significant number also went to the United Kingdom, France, the Palestine Mandate (modern Israel) and Argentina. During the 1930s it was difficult for women to obtain employment, and as such, it was more common for Jewish women to stay in Württemberg as they feared that they would be unable to find a job if they went abroad. Besides the sexual divide, older Jews were more likely to choose to stay in Württemberg than younger Jews.

Starting in January 1939, the Nazi regime launched the Action T4 program to kill all Germans with physically disabilities and/or learning disabilities in order to cleanse the Volksgemeinschaft ("people's community") of all "useless eaters" (so-called because they consumed food that according to the regime should have gone to the healthy members of the Volksgemeinschaft). In October 1939, the Action T4 program arrived in Württemberg when the Schloss Grafeneck, a home for "cripples" outside of Stuttgart started to be converted into a killing center with its gas chambers and crematorium. Opening in its new role as a killing center for "life unworthy of life" in January 1940, by December of that year, 10,654 people were killed at the Schloss Grafeneck, of which 3,884 were from Württemberg, 4,451 were from Baden and 1,864 were from Bavaria. The first 13 people killed in January 1940 were all people suffering from epilepsy with the official story that they had been killed by a highly virulent strain of the flu, which required that their bodies be burned immediately. People living near the Schloss Grafeneck complained constantly about the smell of burned human flesh being in the air.

Doctors who were assigned the role of "racial engineers" were overrepresented in the NSDAP. In Württemberg, 36% of all doctors were NSDAP members, and the majority willingly went along with the effort to kill their "worthless" patients, arranging for those with physical and/or intellectual disabilities to be sent to the Schloss Grafeneck. Typical of those classified by their doctors as a "useless eater" was a farmer who had been injured in a work accident in 1929 and had been living on disability ever since; in May 1940, his doctor classified him as a "useless eater", causing him to go Schloss Grafeneck, where he was gassed. Otto Küstner, the president of the Württemberg supreme court had a brother who was living in a mental asylum. Through Küstner was a loyal supporter of the regime, twice he took his brother home to prevent him from going to Schloss Grafeneck while denying to other people with relatives at the same asylum that people were being killed at Schloss Grafeneck. Those selected to die at Schloss Grafeneck were always taken in buses painted in a very distinctive shade of grey. Through the Nazi regime mocked people living in asylums as "life unworthy of life" who were too incompetent to understand what was happening around them, in many cases people had to be dragged kicking and screaming from the asylums into the grey buses that were to take them to Schloss Grafeneck. Other people taken from the asylums broke down in tears as they boarded the buses, knowing that they would die at the Schloss Grafeneck. Farmers living around Schloss Grafeneck noted the correlation between the arrival of the grey buses, which was followed up shortly afterwards by the smell of burned human flesh coming from the crematorium, leading to the conclusion that people could not possibly be dying of the flu that swiftly all the time.

Württemberg's location in southwestern Germany provided a considerable flying distance from Britain while its topography with its steep hills punctured by deep valleys provided additional defenses from bombing. For these reasons, the Bomber Command of the Royal Air Force only infrequently bombed Württemberg at first with the first bombing raid occurred in May 1940. Stuttgart was an important railroad junction and a center of industry, making it into a prime bombing target. Stuttgart was first bombed on 25 August 1940 with raid causing the deaths of 4 people. Besides for Stuttgart, the cities that were most bombed in Württemberg were Friedrichshafen, Heilbronn, and Ulm.

On 8 July 1940, the parents of a young man suffering from schizophrenia who had been gassed wrote to the Reich Justice Minister Franz Gürtner to say their son had been "murdered", saying they had "absolutely reliable information" that all of the patients at Grafeneck were being killed, going on to ask that Gürtner prosecute those responsible. In October 1940, the Stuttgart public prosecutor wrote to Gürtner say the "rumors of mass murder are spreading like wildfire" and that many people were afraid to take elderly relatives to hospitals out of the fear that they might go to Grafeneck. In some areas of Württemberg, the Action T4 program caused much shock, and in a form of passive resistance, many ordinary people banded together to find jobs for the "useless eaters" and thereby prove them to be "useful" to the Volksgemeinschaft. Despite the horror caused by the Action T4 program, most people in Württemberg did not blame Hitler, believing that he was unaware of what was happening and would stop it if he knew. In December 1940, the Schloss Grafeneck was shut down as the majority of the people classified as "useless eaters" in Württemberg were now dead.

In World War Two, the demographics of Württemberg changed as hundreds of thousands of men were called up for service in the Wehrmacht while hundreds of thousands of Poles and French were brought to Württemberg to do both industrial and agricultural work as slaves in everything but name. Before 1943, the Nazi regime was most reluctant to have German women engaged in war production, and instead brought in foreigners to replace the men serving in the Wehrmacht. Hitler believed that having women work in factories would damage their wombs, and thereby prevent them from bearing the next generation of the Herrnvolk, making him very much against having women being work in war production. Adding to the difficulties of the farming households was that the Wehrmacht had taken thousands of horses for its quartermasters. By October 1940, there were 17,500 Poles working on the farms of Württemberg, and the number of Poles was to increase as the war went on and the Nazi regime was forced to conscript more and more farmers to replace the Wehrmacht's losses. The rules governing the Poles in Württemberg stated that they were to observe a curfew between 9 pm-5 am in summertime and between 8:00 pm-6 am in the wintertime; could only use public transportation with a special permit granted by the police; were banned from eating in restaurants and using telephones; were forbidden to own radios, bicycles, and cameras; and those permitted to use public transportation were forbidden to use the seats in buses and trams. Through the rules stated the Poles were to attend separate church services from the Germans, in practice several Catholic priests in the countryside ignored this rule and allowed the Poles to attend Mass alongside the Germans, much to the displeasure of the Nazi regime.

Starting in the summer of 1941 the ranks of the slaves were vastly increased by Soviet POWs, though the tendency of the Nazi regime to allow them to starve to death led to the deaths of almost all of the Red Army POWs by the end of 1941. Only in December 1941, when it became clear that the Soviet Union would not be defeated in 1941 as expected, were proper rations provided to the Red Army POWs as their labor was now needed to maintain German war production. By 1942, the language of the majority of the workers at the Daimler-Benz factory in Stuttgart was Russian. The Daimler-Benz executives argued that providing the Soviet POWs with only "starvation rations" was bad for the productivity of the factory as the POWs tended to quite literally drop dead on the factory floor. On 1 December 1941, the first deportation of Jews from Württemberg took place when about 1,000 Jews were rounded up, loaded onto a train in Stuttgart that took all the way to Riga, where all of the Jews were shot upon arrival. There were to be 11 more deportations via trains that took the local Jews to be exterminated in Latvia. Of the 2,500 Jews who were deported from Württemberg, only 180 survived. By the time the French and the Americans occupied Württemberg in April 1945, there were only 200 Jews living in all of Württemberg.

The Nazis mocked the Poles, most of whom came from the countryside, for their "primitive levels of hygiene" and expected all Germans to do likewise. However, the regime was apparently not aware that the level of hygiene on farms in Württemberg was about the same as on Polish farms. The majority of the Württemberg farms lacked electricity and running water and it was common for families of farmers to share their homes with their farm animals, which were precisely the same conditions that existed on Polish farms. Many of the families of farmers in Württemberg did not have the same level of contempt for the Poles that Germans from an urban background had, and the rules forbidding friendships between Germans and Poles were often ignored. Furthermore, in marked contrast to the attitudes towards Jews, many Catholic farmers saw the Polish workers as merely fellow Catholics who came from a similar background as themselves who just happened to speak another language. However, the historian Jill Stephenson noted that how well a German family treated their Polish workers often depended on the degree that the labor was needed with farmers who needed Polish labor the most tending to treat them the best. In households headed by women, almost invariably the farmwife would take one or more of her Polish laborers as her lover.

As there was a shortage of German men in the countryside due to so many men serving in the Wehrmacht, sexual relationships between Polish men and German women were very common, to the intense fury of the Nazi regime which tried very hard to stamp out such relationships. The Nazi Kreisleiter of Esslingen am Neckar, Eugen Hund, later stated that he was so harsh with German women who had foreign lovers because: "Females, I would not call them women, who in 1940 in a time of war, turned a battling and struggling Fatherland into a whorehouse, had to be treated like whores". The State Prosecutor of Württemberg noted in 1940 that the overwhelming majority of German women found guilty of "racial defilement" were "farm maids, farmer's wives, farmer's daughters, and women from the rural middle class". Unlike the workers in urban areas who were kept segregated from the rest of German society, in the countryside, Polish and other foreign laborers lived alongside the Germans. The close proximity allowed for more closer relationships. One Nazi district leader in a rural area of Württemberg complained in 1944: "Does it not make a mockery of our Weltanschauung if I enter a German peasant home and there in a German pram lies the child of a Russian woman, sired by a Frenchman and cared for by German women?"

The first public pillorying of German women in Württemberg for "racial defilement" took place in September 1940 with 12 women being put on display to be mocked and humiliated. Three of the women had French lovers, and claimed that they believed it was only illegal to have sex with Poles, an explanation that was not accepted by the Württemberg State prosecutor. In July 1941, six Polish men who had slept with German women were publicly hanged in various villages in Württemberg as a warning against "racial defilement". The State Prosecutor approvingly reported that such executions were having an effect, through Stephenson wrote the actual effect of the executions was merely to inspire Polish and French men in relationships with German women to be more "discreet". There were many complaints in the Württemberg countryside about the sexual double standard of the Nazi regime as German men who had relationships with foreign women were generally given a warning while foreign men who had relationships with German women, especially if they were from Eastern Europe, were executed. German women found guilty of "racial defilement" were publicly humiliated with their heads being shaven by members of the local SA and NSDAP members and being forced to wear signs reading "I went with a Pole and polluted German blood". Afterwards, the women were sent to the concentration camp at Ravensbruck. Such rituals of public humiliation was deeply unpopular with the local people who found such rituals "repellent". By contrast, in 1943 when three members of the Hitler Youth, all under the age of 18, together with another young German man who was about 20 were found to be having sex with a group of Frenchwomen working in Stuttgart; the Stuttgart public prosecutor had the three Hitler Youth charged under the Youth Protection Order, but the young man escaped charges as the prosecutor stated "because there is no penalty for having sex with foreign women workers, even if they belong to enemy states and it constitutes a major national disgrace". Even with the Hitler Youth charged under the Youth Protection Order, the public prosecutor saw them more as victims, charging that most of the Frenchwomen working in Germany for the Service du travail obligatoire were "big city prostitutes" who were corrupting innocent Hitler Youth into lives of debauchery, leading him to seek lenient sentences.

On the night 5 May 1942, Stuttgart was bombed for the fourth time, a raid that killed 13 people, which marked the first time since 1940 that any air raid had killed anyone in Stuttgart. Later on in May–June 1942, Bomber Command tried hard to destroy the Bosch factory in Stuttgart where generators were manufactured, but the raids were unsuccessful. An attempt to destroy the SKF factory that made ball-bearings in Stuttgart in September 1943 by Bomber Command was equally unsuccessful at a high cost. Daimler-Benz chose to spread out its production around the Stuttgart area, which proved successful, through the dispersal slowed down its production of aircraft engines and cylinders, valve and camshafts for military vehicles. From April 1943 onward, Bomber Command started to regularly bomb the cities and towns of Württemberg on a nightly basis, causing much damage. On the night of 27 April 1943, Bomber Command launched an especially heavy raid on the town of Friedrichshafen in an attempt to destroy the three factories that made tank engines in that town. On 6 September 1943, Stuttgart was bombed in the daylight for the first time when the United States Army Air Force bombed the city in a raid that left 107 people dead in Stuttgart. On April 27–28, 1944, Friedrichshafen was again heavily bombed in a series of Anglo-American air raids with the raids destroying 40% of all the buildings in Friedrichshafen.

The heaviest bombing raids yet occurred between 25 and 30 July 1944 when Bomber Command struck at Stuttgart in a series of nightly raids that destroyed all of downtown Stuttgart while killing about 1,000 people and leaving another 100,000 people homeless. On 27 July 1944, Friedrichshafen was again heavily bombed by the RAF in an attempt to destroy the factory that made jet engines. Stuttgart was again struck hard in a series of Anglo-American bombing raids in September–October 1944 aimed at destroying the railroad system, but which also seriously damaged the water and sewage systems. The heaviest bombing raids occurred on 19–20 October 1944, which left 338 people dead while wounding 872. By this point, the Lord Mayor, Dr. Karl Strölin had asked all non-essential people leave Stuttgart. By the fall of 1944 Daimler-Benz had been forced to move its Stuttgart factories underground to keep them functioning. In September 1944, Heilbronn was being bombed on such a regular basis that the local Nazi kreislater, Richard Drauz, the mayor and the police chief all asked Murr for permission to move the non-essential people out of Heilbronn, permission that was denied by Murr who insisted that it would depress morale. On 4 December 1944, Heilbronn was badly damaged in an air raid that saw about 6,000 people killed while the entire downtown of the city turned into a ruin. Ulm was badly damaged in an air raid on 17 December 1944. The only city in Württemberg that escaped major damage was the university city of Tübingen, which had no industry to bomb.

In October 1944, American and French forces entered Baden, to be followed shortly by Württemberg. Many of the "French" soldiers fighting in Württemberg were actually Algerians and Moroccans, both of whom were greatly feared by Germans. The soldiers from the Maghreb were believed to be especially prone to rape. In the village of Mössingen, Moroccan soldiers were said to have raped 220 women after taking the village while the Moroccans were said to raped 200 women in the village of Ditzigen. The Americans took Stuttgart on Easter Sunday 1945. By 30 April 1945, all of Baden, Württemberg and Hohenzollern were completely occupied by American and French forces.

== Southwest Germany after the war ==
After World War II was over, the states of Baden and Württemberg were split between the American occupation zone in the north and the French occupation zone in the south, which also got Hohenzollern. The border between the occupation zones followed the district borders, but they were drawn purposely in such a way that the autobahn from Karlsruhe to Munich (today the Bundesautobahn 8) ended up inside the American occupation zone. In the American occupation zone, the state of Württemberg-Baden was founded; in the French occupation zone, the southern part of former Baden became the new state of Baden while the southern part of Württemberg and Hohenzollern were fused into Württemberg-Hohenzollern.

Article 29 of the Basic Law of Germany provided for a way to change the German states via a community vote; however, it could not enter into force due to a veto by the Allied forces. Instead, a separate article 118 mandated the fusion of the three states in the southwest via a trilateral agreement. If the three affected states failed to agree, federal law would have to regulate the future of the three states. This article was based on the results of a conference of the German states held in 1948, where the creation of a Southwest State was agreed upon. The alternative, generally favored in South Baden, was to recreate Baden and Württemberg (including Hohenzollern) in its old, pre-war borders.

The trilateral agreement failed because the states couldn't agree on the voting system. As such, federal law decided on 4 May 1951 that the area be split into four electoral districts: North Württemberg, South Württemberg, North Baden and South Baden. Because it was clear that both districts in Württemberg as well as North Baden would support the merger, the voting system favored the supporters of the new Southwest State. The state of Baden brought the law to the German Constitutional Court to have it declared as unconstitutional, but failed.

The plebiscite took place on 9 December 1951. In both parts of Württemberg, 93% were in favor of the merger, in North Baden 57% were in favor, but in South Baden only 38% were. Because three of four electoral districts voted in favor of the new Southwest State, the merger was decided upon. Had Baden as a whole formed a single electoral district, the vote would have failed.

== State of Baden-Württemberg from 1952 to the present ==
The members of the constitutional convention were elected on 9 March 1952, and on 25 April the Prime Minister was elected. With this, the new state of Baden-Württemberg was founded. After the constitution of the new state entered force, the members of the constitutional convention formed the state parliament until the first election in 1956. The name Baden-Württemberg was only intended as a temporary name, but ended up the official name of the state because no other name could be agreed upon.

In May 1954, the Baden-Württemberg Landtag (legislature) decided on adoption of the following coat of arms: three black lions on a golden shield, framed by a deer and a griffin. This coat of arms once belonged to the Staufen family, emperors of the Holy Roman Empire and Dukes of Swabia. The golden deer stands for Württemberg, the griffin for Baden. Conversely the former Württemberg counties of Calw, Freudenstadt, Horb, Rottweil and Tuttlingen were incorporated into the Baden governmental districts of Karlsruhe and Freiburg. The last traces of Hohenzollern disappeared. Between county and district, regional associations were formed that are responsible for overlapping planning.

The opponents of the merger did not give up. After the General Treaty gave Germany full sovereignty, the opponents applied for a community vote to restore Baden to its old borders by virtue of paragraph 2 of Article 29 of the Basic Law, which allowed a community vote in states which had been changed after the war without a community vote. The Federal Ministry of the Interior refused the application on the grounds that a community vote had already taken place. The opponents sued in front of the German Constitutional Court and won in 1956, with the court deciding that the plebiscite of 1951 had not been a community vote as defined by the law because the more populous state of Württemberg had had an unfair advantage over the less populous state of Baden. Because the court did not set a date for the community vote, the government simply did nothing. The opponents eventually sued again in 1969, which led to the decision that the vote had to take place before 30 June 1970. On 7 June, the majority voted against the proposal to restore the state of Baden.

== See also ==
- Timeline of Stuttgart
- History of Südwestrundfunk; the Südwestrundfunk (SWR) is the public-broadcasting institution of Baden-Württemberg (and Rhineland-Palatinate)
- History of Franconia

== Books and articles ==
- Stephenson, Jill (2006). Hitler's Home Front Wurttemberg Under the Nazis. London: Bloomsbury Academic. ISBN 978-1852854423.
