= Eberhard VI =

Eberhard VI may refer to:

- Eberhard VI of Nellenburg (died 1080), archbishop of Salzburg
- Eberhard VI, Count of Württemberg (died 1504)
