= Ulrich III of Württemberg =

Count of Württemberg from 1325 to 1344

Ulrich III
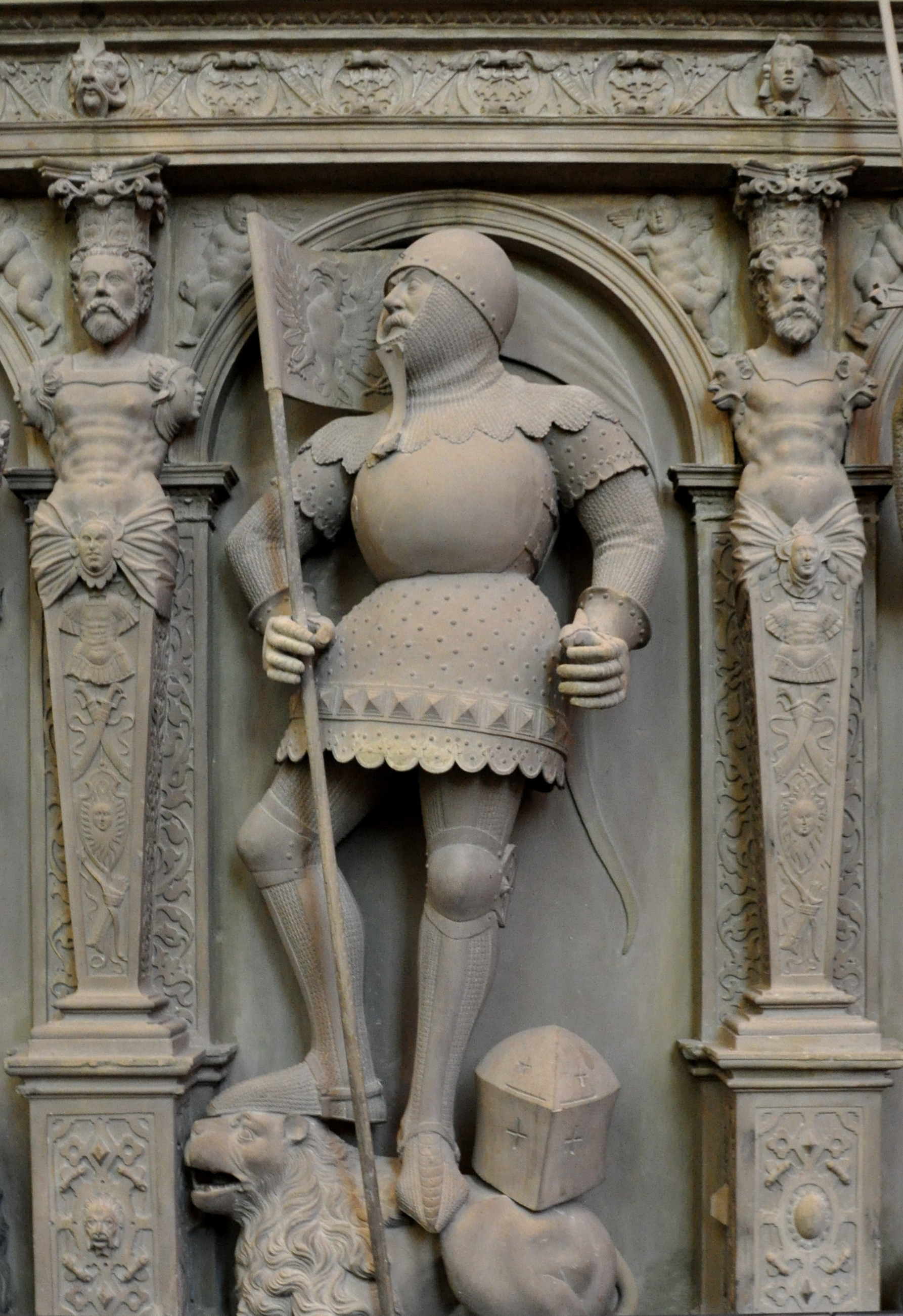
- Statue by Sem Schlör in the Stuttgart Stiftskirche, 1574–1586

Count of Württemberg
- Reign: 1325 – 11 July 1344
- Predecessor: Eberhard I
- Successors: Eberhard II and Ulrich IV
- Born: 1286–1291
- Died: 11 July 1344 (aged 52–57); Alsace
- Burial: Stiftskirche, Stuttgart
- Spouse: Sophie of Pfirt
- Issue: Eberhard II; Ulrich IV
- House: Württemberg
- Father: Eberhard I

Ulrich III (1286/1291 – 11 July 1344) was Count of Württemberg from 1325 until his death in 1344.

== Life ==
Ulrich was born between 1286 and 1291 to Count Eberhard I and an uncertain mother, either Margarethe of Lorraine (died before 1296) or Irmengard of Baden (died after 1320). He was already strongly involved in the administration of Württemberg during the reign of his father. For example, in 1319 he negotiated a treaty with King Frederick the Fair. He renewed this treaty after becoming count in 1325, when Württemberg had temporarily joined sides with Louis IV. Both Louis and Frederick claimed power in the Holy Roman Empire at this time. After their reconciliation it was possible for Ulrich to be bound closely to the Holy Roman Empire, even after the death of Frederick I. This and his regional policy of pacts and acquisitions helped strongly to enlarge Württemberg's territory substantially. Besides several gains in Alsace, the purchase of Markgröningen in 1336 and Tübingen in 1342 are notable.

Ulrich died in Alsace on 11 July 1344 and was later buried in the Stiftskirche of Stuttgart.

== Marriage and children ==
Ulrich was married to Sophie of Pfirt. Sons from this marriage were Eberhard II and Ulrich IV, who ruled together with his brother until 1361.

Ulrich III of Württemberg House of Württemberg Died: 11 July 1344
German nobility
Preceded by Eberhard I	Count of Württemberg; 1325–1344	Succeeded by Eberhard II and Ulrich IV
