= Albrecht II, Count of Hohenberg-Rotenburg =

Albrecht II (or Albert II) of Hohenberg-Rotenburg (c. 1235 – 17 April 1298) was Count of Hohenberg and Haigerloch and imperial governor of Lower Swabia. He was a member of the house of Zollern-Hohenberg, a branch of the Swabian House of Hohenzollern which split off in the 12th century. Two stanzas in the Codex Manesse are attributed to him under the name of Albrecht von Haigerloch.

== Life ==
=== Count and Vogt ===
Albrecht was the son of Count Burchard V of Hohenberg and his wife Mechthild hereditary countess (Erbgräfin) from the family of Counts Palatine of Tübingen. On his father's death in 1253 he inherited the territory around Hohenberg Castle, Haigerloch and Rotenburg. His younger brother Burkhard VI. (d. 1318) inherited the lands of his mother around the castles of Nagold and Wildberg, and founded a separate Hohenberg line.

At around 1280, Albrecht founded the town of Rotenburg (today Rottenburg am Neckar) near the existing castle as new administrative center of his county. A more central authority was necessary because of the constant territorial extensions of Hohenberg towards the Neckar.

He was a supporter of his brother-in-law, the king Rudolf I of Habsburg, who was married to his older sister Gertrud Anna. He benefited from the rise of the Habsburgs; he was a close adviser to the king and accompanied him on several campaigns. In 1290 a visit of Albrecht to the court of Wenceslaus II of Bohemia is documented.

Rudolf commissioned Albrecht as a bailiff (Landvogt) of the newly-formed territory of Niederschwaben to win back lost imperial territory. However Rudolph's plans to revive the Duchy of Swabia and win it over for the Habsburgs failed. After Rudolf's death Albrecht supported his son Albrecht of Austria against the elected king Adolf of Nassau-Weilburg. In 1298, while trying to prevent Otto III, Duke of Bavaria from uniting his army with Adolf's against Albrecht of Austria, Albrecht fell in the battle on the Kreuzwiesen near his castle of Leinstetten.

=== Minstrel ===
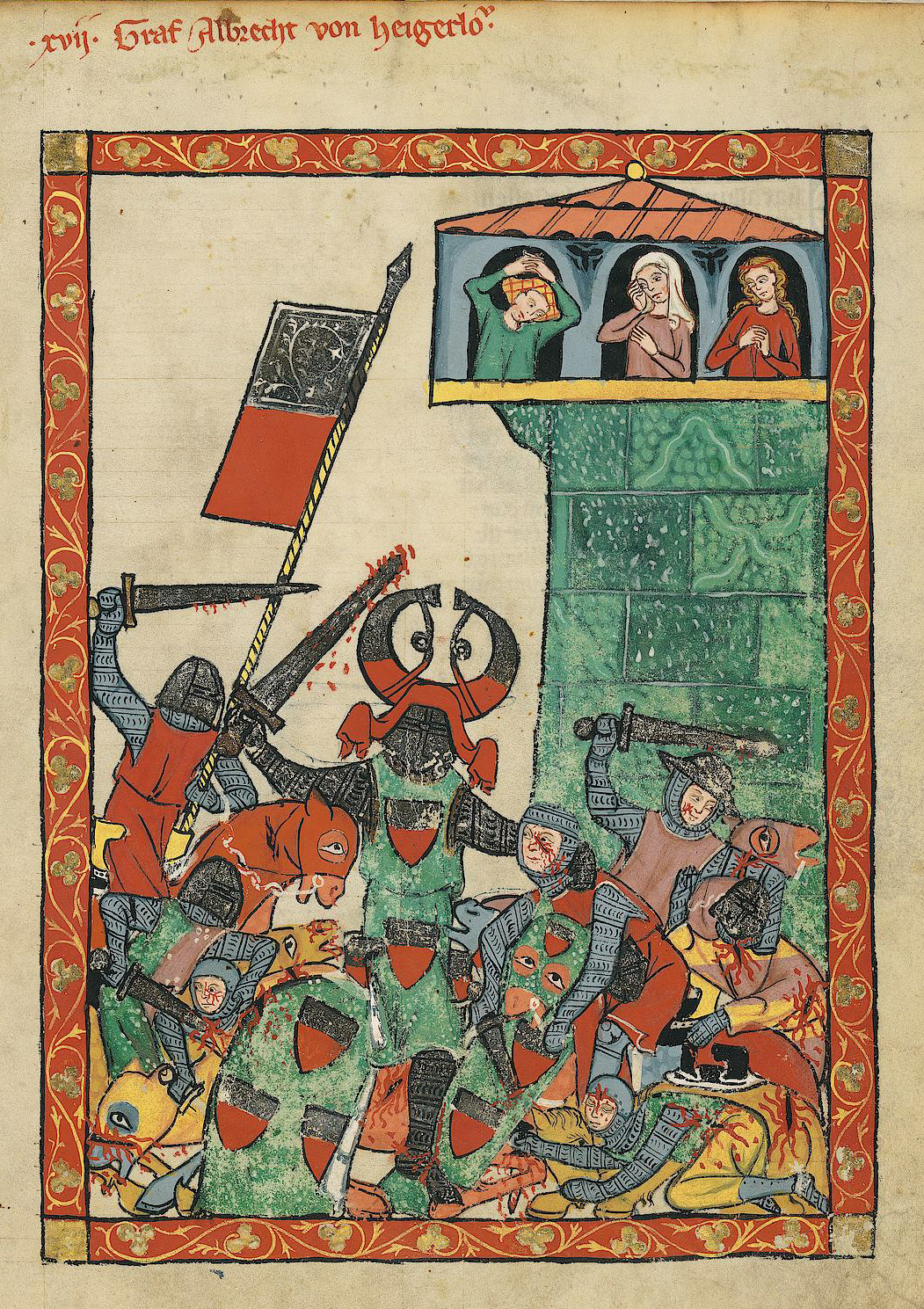
Codex Manesse: Count Albrecht II. in battle

Albrecht is also noted as a minstrel. In the Codex Manesse on page 42r is a miniature showing him under the name of Count Albrecht of Haigerloch as a knight in battle (presumably the battle in which he fell). The back of the page contains the only two song verses ascribed to Albrecht.

== Descendants ==
Albrecht was married three times. The name of his first wife is unknown. He had two children from this marriage:

- Agnes m. 1281 Albrecht (d. 1292), Count of Gorizia and Tyrol
- Albrecht III, called Rösselmann (d. 1304), Count of Hohenberg m.c. 1284, spouse unknown

In 1282 he married Countess Margareta von Fürstenberg (d. 1296). From this marriage he had three children:

- Margaretha (d. 1295) m.(engagement 1288) Henry IV (d. 1301), Margrave of Burgau
- Mechthild m. 1291 Ulrich (d. 1315), son of Eberhard I, Count of Württemberg
- Rudolf I. (d. 1336), Count of Hohenberg, Lord of Triberg

His third wife was Countess Ursula von Oettingen (d. 1308). From this marriage two children were born:

- Albrecht, a monk in Bonndorf 1317
- Adelheid (d. February 23, 1333) m. 1317 Konrad I (d. 1353), Count of Schaunberg
