= Henriette of Montbéliard =

Henriette
- Countess of Montbéliard, suo jure
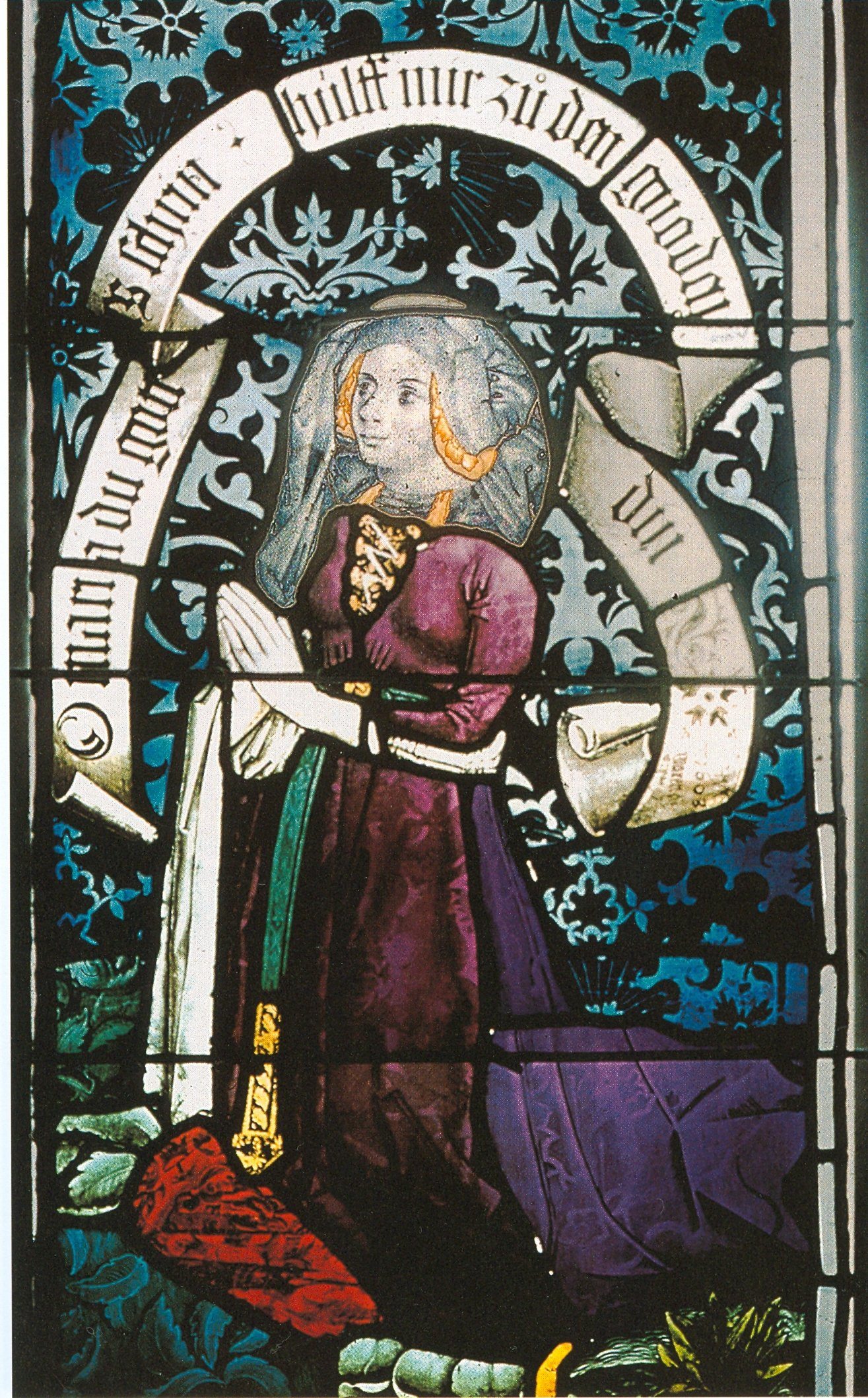
- Born: 1387
- Died: 14 February 1444; Montbéliard
- Noble family: House of Montfaucon (by birth); House of Württemberg (by marriage)
- Spouse: Eberhard IV, Count of Württemberg
- Father: Henry of Orbe
- Mother: Marie de Chatillon-Blaigny

Henriette (1387 – 14 February 1444) was Sovereign Countess of Montbéliard from 1397 until 1444.

She was the daughter of Henry of Orbe (died 1396), and the heiress of her grandfather, Stephen, Count of Montbéliard. Her great-grandfather was Henry I of Montbéliard. She married Eberhard IV, Count of Württemberg and governed the city of Montbéliard together with her husband.

It was because of this marriage that Montbéliard became a part of Württemberg. At his death in 1419, she took over the regency for her son Ulrich. In 1422 her daughter Anna (1408–1471, Countess of Katzenelnbogen), married Philipp I, Count of Katzenelnbogen in Darmstadt, one of the most magnificent medieval weddings, with a dowry of 32,000florins.

== Family and children ==
She was married to Eberhard IV, Count of Württemberg and had two sons and a daughter:

1. Anna of Württemberg (1408–1471), married Philip I, Count of Katzenelnbogen
2. Louis I of Württemberg (1412 – 24 September 1450, Urach).
3. Ulrich V of Württemberg (1413 – 1 September 1480, Leonberg).

== See also ==
- History of Württemberg
- Franche-Comté

== Notes and references ==
Henriette of Montbéliard House of Montfaucon Born: 1387 Died: 14 February 1444
Preceded by Stephen	Count of Montbéliard; 1397–1444	Succeeded by Louis I
