= Ulrich IV of Württemberg =

Count of Württemberg from 1344 to 1362

Ulrich IV
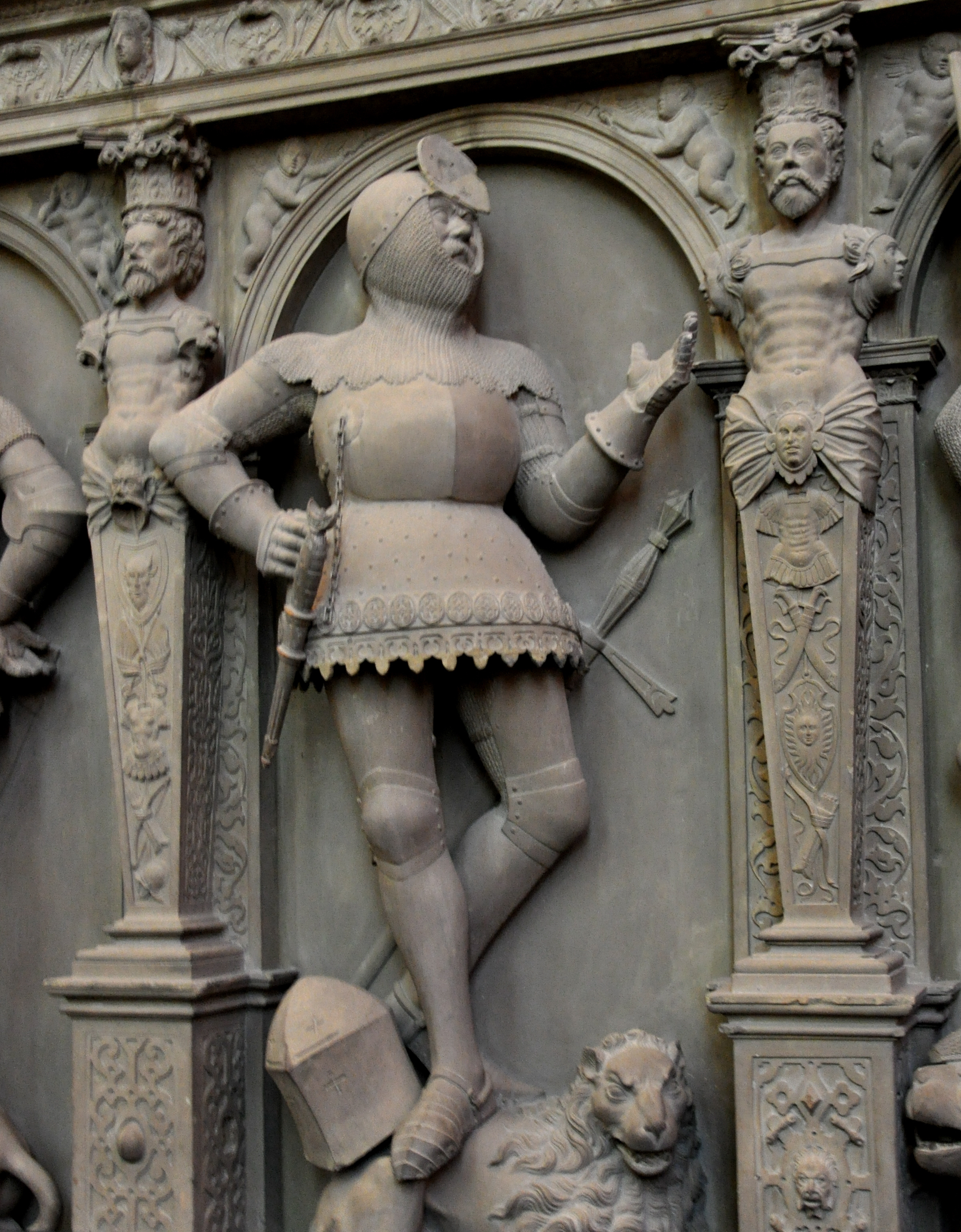
- Statue by Sem Schlör in the Stuttgart Stiftskirche, 1574–1586

Count of Württemberg
- Reign: 1344 – 1 May 1362
- Predecessor: Ulrich III
- Successor: Eberhard IV
- Co-ruler: Eberhard IV
- Born: after 1315
- Died: July 1366 (aged 50–51); Hohenneuffen Castle, Württemberg
- Burial: Stiftskirche, Stuttgart
- Spouse: Katharina of Helfenstein
- House: Württemberg
- Father: Ulrich III
- Mother: Sophie of Pfirt

Ulrich IV (after 1315 – 24 or 26 July 1366) was Count of Württemberg, co-ruling with his brother, Eberhard II, from 1344 until his forced resignation on 1 May 1362.

During his reign he stood in the shadow of his brother Eberhard II. Because of that he temporarily strove towards the division of the realm. This is the reason why Eberhard II forced him to sign a treaty that stipulated the indivisibility of the county on 3 December 1361. Soon after that Ulrich relinquished his participation in the government of Württemberg on 1 May 1362.

Ulrich IV married countess Katharina of Helfenstein before 1350, producing no children.

Ulrich died in Hohenneuffen Castle on 24 or 26 July 1366 and was buried in the Stuttgart Stiftskirche.

Ulrich IV House of Württemberg Born: 1315 Died: July 1366
German nobility
Preceded by Ulrich III	Count of Württemberg; 1344–1362 with Eberhard IV	Succeeded by Eberhard IV as sole ruler
