= Stephen of Montfaucon =

Stephen of Montfaucon (1325 – 1 November 1397) was Lord of Montfaucon and Count of Montbéliard from 1367 until his death. He was the son of Henry of Montfaucon and Agnes of Chalon.

== Family ==
He married Marguerite of Chalon-Arlay, daughter of John II of Chalon-Arlay, and they had three children:

- Louis; died young
- Henry of Orbe (died 1396); his daughter and heir was Henriette, Countess of Montbéliard, through whom Stephen was a great-grandfather of Ulrich V, Count of Württemberg and thus his descendants
- Johanna; married Louis of Neuchâtel.

Preceded by Henry of Montfaucon	Count of Montbéliard; 1367–1397	Succeeded by Henry of Orbe / Henriette
