= Eberhard I =

Eberhard I may refer to:

- Eberhard I of Friuli (c. 815–867)
- Eberhard I, Count of Bonngau (fl. 904–937)
- Eberhard I, Count of Berg-Altena (1140–1180)
- Eberhard I (archbishop of Salzburg) (fl. 1147–1164)
- Eberhard I, Count of the Mark (c. 1255–1308)
- Eberhard I, Count of Württemberg (1265–1325)
- Eberhard I, Duke of Württemberg (1445–1496)

== See also ==
- Eberhard
