= Ulrich II of Württemberg =

Ulrich II (c. 1254 – 18 September 1279) was Count of Württemberg from 1265 until 1279.

Ulrich was the son of Ulrich I and Mechthild of Baden. He acceded power in 1265, at the age of 11 and, thus, was most likely under the tutelage of Count Hartmann II of Grüningen. He is first mentioned in documents around 1270. It's unknown if Ulrich was married.

His half-brother Eberhard I succeeded him. His body rested in the church of Beutelsbach. In 1316 or 1320 his remains were moved to the Stiftskirche in Stuttgart.

Preceded by Ulrich I	Count of Württemberg; 1265–1279	Succeeded by Eberhard I
