= Eberhard II =

Eberhard II may refer to:

- Eberhard II, Count of the Mark, (c. 1255 – 1308)
- Eberhard II, Count of Württemberg (after 1315 – 1392)
- Eberhard II von der Mark (1365–1440)
- Eberhard II, Duke of Württemberg (1447–1504)
