= Eberhard II, Count of Württemberg =

Count of Württemberg from 1344 to 1392

Eberhard II
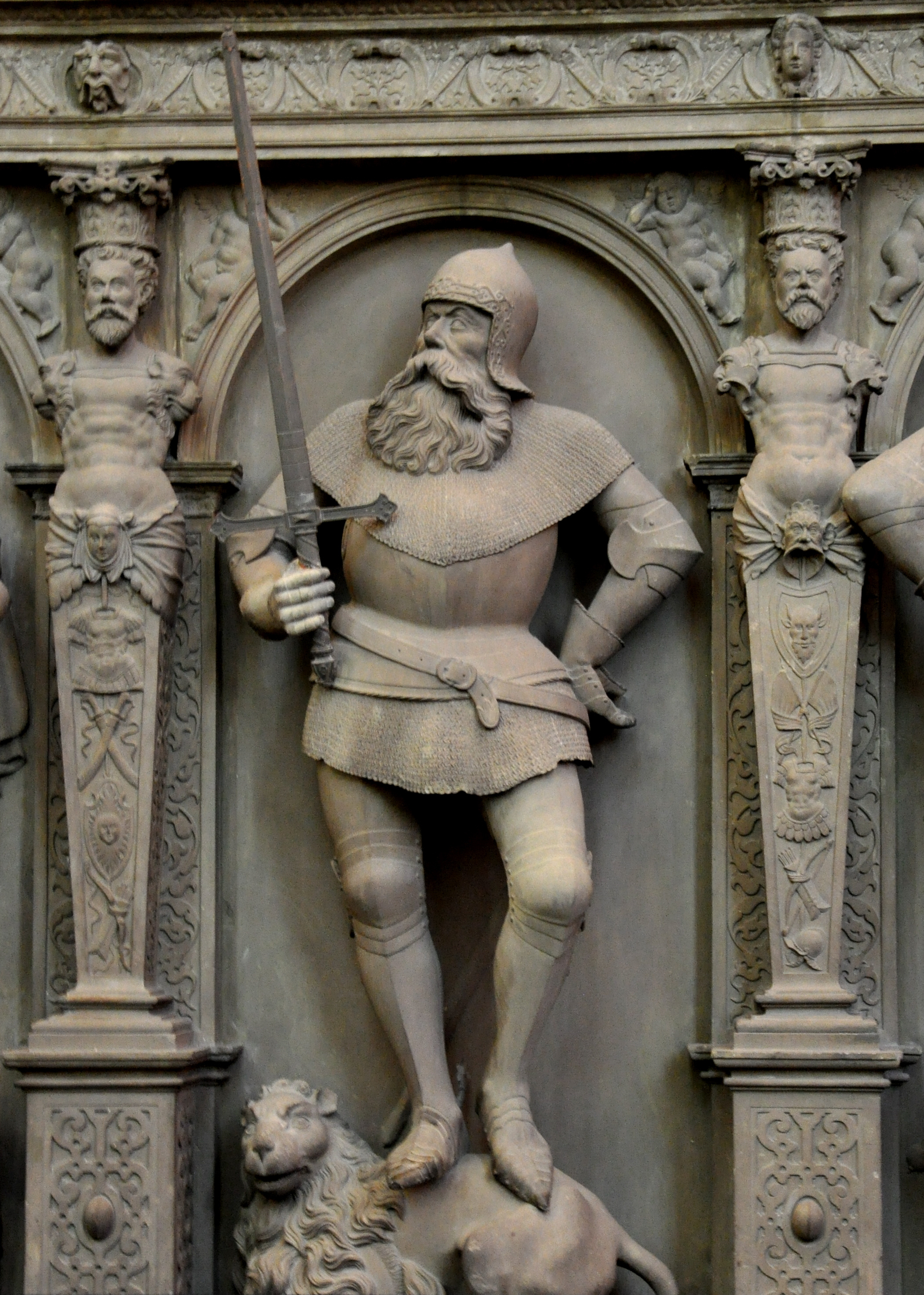
- Statue by Sem Schlör in the Stuttgart Stiftkirche, 1574–1586

Count of Württemberg
- Reign: 1344 – 15 March 1392
- Predecessor: Ulrich III
- Successor: Eberhard III
- Co-ruler: Ulrich IV (1344–1362)
- Born: 1315
- Died: 15 March 1392 (aged 76–77); Stuttgart, Württemberg
- Burial: Stiftskirche, Stuttgart
- Spouse: Elisabeth of Henneberg-Schleusingen (m. 1342; died 1384)
- Issue: Ulrich of Württemberg; Sophie
- House: Württemberg
- Father: Ulrich III
- Mother: Sophie of Pfirt

Eberhard II (1315 – 15 March 1392), nicknamed the Quarrelsome (German: der Greiner), was Count of Württemberg from 1344 until his death in 1392. He ruled Württemberg alongside his brother, Ulrich IV, before forcing him out of power in 1362.

== Life ==
Eberhard was born in 1315, the eldest son of Count Ulrich III and his wife Sophie (died 1344), daughter of Theobald of Ferrette. Eberhard married Elisabeth of Henneberg-Schleusingen, daughter of Count Henry VIII of Henneberg-Schleusingen, before 17 September 1342. The marriage produced two children: Ulrich of Württemberg and Sophie (died 1369), who married John I, Duke of Lorraine in 1361. Ulrich married Elisabeth of Bavaria, daughter of Emperor Louis IV, but was killed at the Battle of Döffingen in 1388.

Following the death of Ulrich III in 1344, Eberhard and brother Ulrich IV governed together. However, Eberhard proved the more assertive and energetic of the two, giving his brother little influence in the administration of Württemberg. Ulrich began pressing for a division of the county in 1352, possibly at the insistence of his wife Katharina of Helfenstein, in order to escape his brother's dominance. In 1361, Ulrich demanded a partition again, leading Eberhard to imprison his brother's councilors and the beginning of open hostility between the two. Ulrich then petitioned Emperor Charles IV for a compromise, but he sided with Eberhard and confirmed the indivisibility of Württemberg. On 1 May 1362, Ulrich renounced his position in the government in exchange for various castles, notably Hohenneuffen, and other towns.

A sensation was created 1367 by the assault of Count Wolf von Eberstein on Eberhard II and his son Ulrich during their stay "in Wildbad" (presumably Wildbad or Teinach). Both fled and seized Neueberstein Castle immediately with a large number of men. However this siege turned out to be unsuccessful.

During his regency he strongly aligned his policy against the Free Imperial Cities, which stood in the way of the extension of Württemberg's territory. He fought battles against the towns united in the Schwäbischer Städtebund (Swabian City League) in 1376, 1372 in Altheim, 1377 in Reutlingen and 1388 near Döffingen. The result of this was a stalemate which secured the independency of the towns. Nevertheless, the territorial gains during his rule were substantial, for example Böblingen and Calw.

Eberhard died in Stuttgart on 15 March 1392 and was buried in the Stiftskirche there.

== Legacy ==
Eberhard was memorialized in literature through ballads by Friedrich Schiller and Ludwig Uhland.

Eberhard II, Count of Württemberg House of Württemberg Born: 1315 Died: 15 March 1392
German nobility
Preceded by Ulrich III	Count of Württemberg; 1344–1392 with Ulrich IV (1344–1362)	Succeeded by Eberhard III
