= Ulrich I, Count of Württemberg =

Count of Württemberg

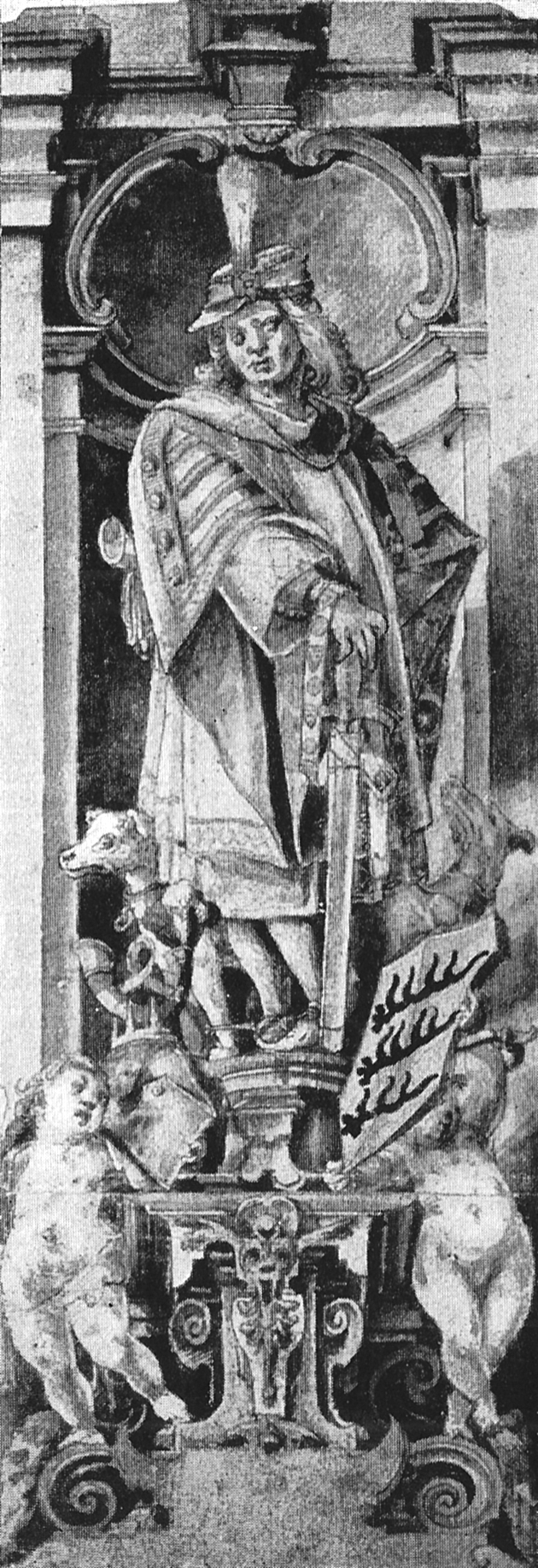

Ulrich I (c. 1222 – 25 February 1265), nicknamed the Founder (German: der Stifter), was Count of Württemberg from 1241 until his death in 1265.

== Life ==
Ulrich's relation to his predecessors is uncertain. The historian Hansmartin Decker Hauff labelled Ulrich as a son of Hermann of Württemberg and Irmengard of Ulten. Hermann, of which very little is known, is probably a son of Hartmann, Count of Württemberg.

Ulrich is believed to have been a cousin to Hartmann II, Count of Grüningen, and to have a paternal relation with Albert IV, Count of Dillingen.

He was twice married. From his marriage to Mechthild of Baden, daughter of Hermann V, he had two daughters, and a son, who succeeded him as Ulrich II. From his second marriage to Agnes of Schlesien-Liegnitz, he had another son, Eberhard I, and possibly another daughter.

== Count of Württemberg ==
The argument between Emperor Frederick II and the Popes Gregory IX and Innocent IV had effects on conditions in the duchy of Swabia, of which Württemberg was a part. After Frederick's excommunication and deposition by the Council of Lyon, Ulrich joined Anti-king Henry Raspe and William of Holland, against Frederick's son Conrad IV. With Ulrich's support, Conrad IV was defeated. Ulrich used the situation, to develop his power within Swabia. After the death of Conrad IV in 1254, however, his two-year-old son Conradin was recognized as Duke of Swabia. Conradin's guardian, Louis II, Duke of Bavaria, annexed the territories that Ulrich had gained from defeating Conrad IV, to Swabia. Ulrich was forced to concentrate on the middle Neckar valley as the basis of the county of Württemberg. His marriage to Mechthild of Baden allowed him to gain control of the region from the Margravate of Baden. Stuttgart, future capital of Württemberg was given to Württemberg by Baden as a wedding gift.

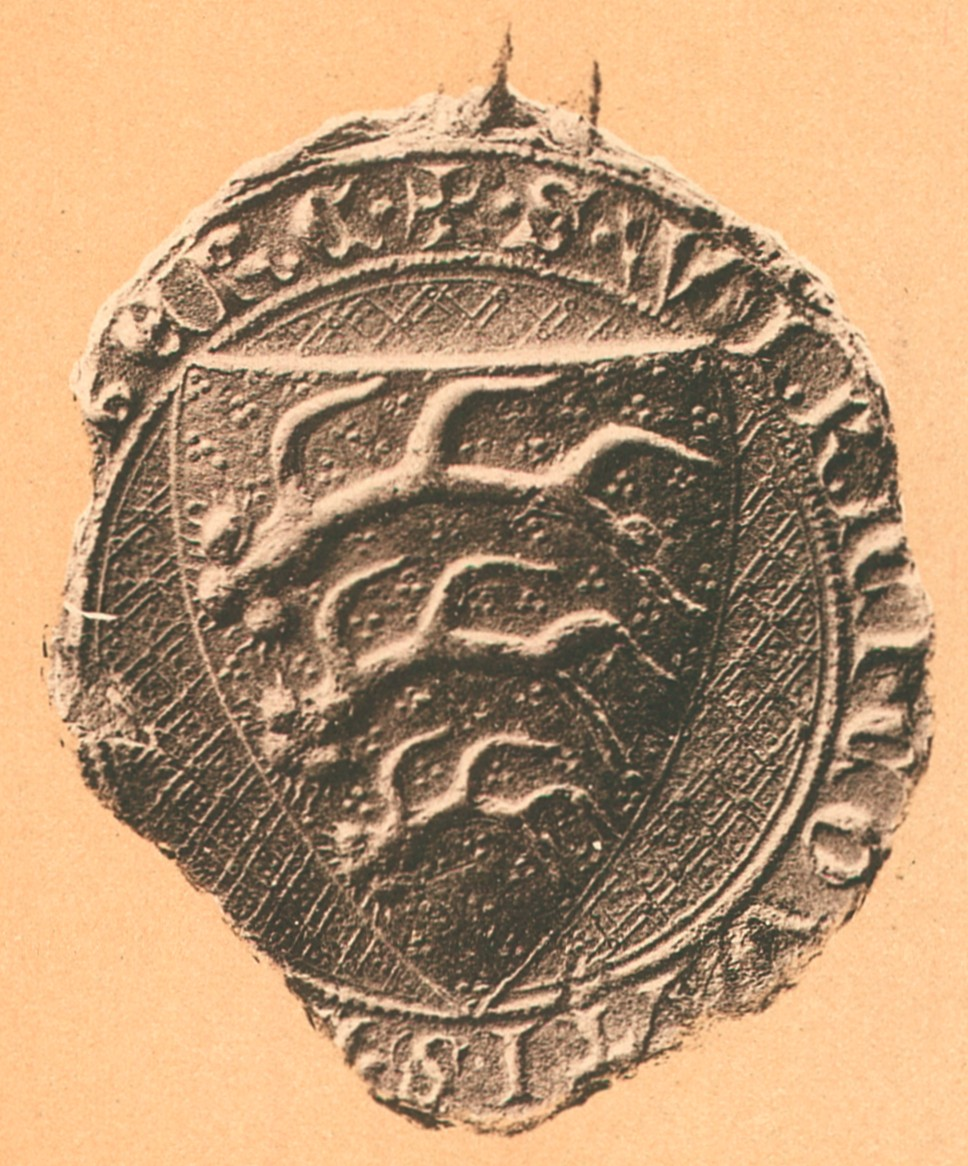
Seal of Ulrich I (1259)

== Issue ==
with Mechthild of Baden, daughter of Hermann V of Baden

- Agnes of Württemberg
- Mechthild of Württemberg
- Ulrich II

with Agnes of Schlesien-Liegnitz, daughter of Bolesław II the Horned

- Eberhard I
- Irmengard of Württemberg

Preceded by Hartmann	Count of Württemberg; 1241–1265	Succeeded by Ulrich II
