= Eberhard I, Count of Württemberg =

Count of Württemberg

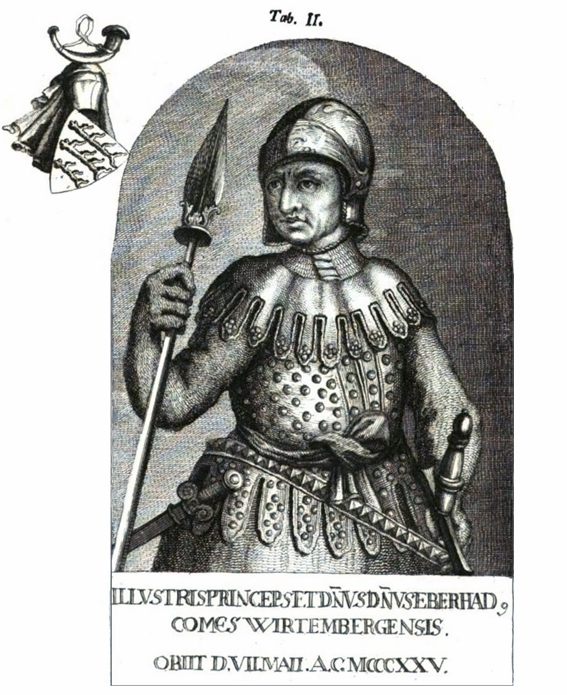
- Born: 13 March 1265; Stuttgart
- Died: 5 June 1325 (aged 60); Stuttgart
- Buried: Stiftskirche, Stuttgart
- Noble family: House of Württemberg
- Spouses: N.N. Margaret of Lorraine; Irmengard of Baden
- Father: Ulrich I, Count of Württemberg
- Mother: Agnes of Silesia-Legnica

Eberhard I (13 March 1265, in Stuttgart – 5 June 1325, in Stuttgart) was Count of Württemberg from 1279 until his death. He was nicknamed 'der Erlauchte' or the Illustrious Highness.

== Life ==
Eberhard's half-brother and predecessor Ulrich II took office at the age of about eleven years. It is generally assumed that he stood under the guardianship and regency of Count Hartmann I of Grüningen. Ulrich II died in 1279 and his guardian Hartmann in 1280, allowing Eberhard to exercise unrestricted reign of the County of Württemberg from 1280.

His father, Ulrich I, had extended the Württemberg territory and the anti-king Henry Raspe had legitimized his conquests. However, when Rudolph I was elected king, these territories had to be returned to the Empire. Rudolph created bailiwicks to administer the reclaimed imperial territories. He appointed his brother-in-law Albert II of Hohenberg-Rotenburg as vogt of the new bailiwick of Lower Swabia. Rudolph's aim was to re-establish the Duchy of Swabia, which had been leaderless after the execution in 1268 of Conradin, the last member of the Hohenstaufen dynasty. To this end, he appointed his young son Rudolph II as duke of Swabia. Eberhard resisted these measures. Despite being weaker, he managed exploit the situation after Rudolph's death in 1291 and achieve military successes against Albert II of Hohenberg-Rotenburg.

Rudolph's successor Adolph of Nassau, did not try to extend his power base into Swabia. After Adolph was overthrown in 1298, Eberhard promised to support his successor Albert I. In return, Albert appointed him vogt of Lower Swabia. Eberhard used this position to safeguard his territorial claims. It was not until 1305 that he again came into military conflict with Albert I.

Eberhard supported the Bohemian nobility in their struggle against Albert I and his successor Henry VII. Vogt Konrad IV von Weinberg, who acted on the orders of Henry VII, declared war on Eberhard, causing much distress in Württemberg. Württemberg was saved from defeat by the death of Henry VII on 24 August 1313 and the 1314 elections Louis IV and Frederick the Fair as rival kings. By maneuvering tactically between the two, Eberhard managed to offset his territorial losses and even gain some more territories. His participation in the war in Bohemia brought in additional funding, which he used to purchase land and towns in Swabia from impoverished noble families, for example, the count palatine of Tübingen.

Eberhard I made Stuttgart the capital of Württemberg. He died in 1325 and was buried in the Stiftskirche in Stuttgart.

== Family ==
Arms of the Counts of Württemberg

Eberhard was the son of Count Ulrich I of Württemberg, who died a few weeks before his birth. His mother was Agnes of Silesia-Legnica, a daughter of Bolesław II Rogatka. She probably died at his birth; some sources speak of a caesarean section.

Eberhard was married three times.

=== First marriage ===
The identity of the first wife is uncertain. Martin Crucius thought she may have been Adelaide of Werdenberg-Heiligenberg from Sigmaringen. Other authors think that she was a member of the noble Hohenberg family, but they may be confused with Matilda of Hohenberg, who married his son and successor Ulrich III. A third theory holds that she was a daughter of the Dukes of Teck. The fact that his son Ulrich III acquired Sigmaringen in 1325 and that his daughter Agnes married Count Henry of Werdenberg-Sargans-Trochtelfingen both point to a close relationship between Eberhard and the Werdenberg dynasty.

This marriage produced a son and a daughter:

- Ulrich (born: after 1285; died: 1315)
- Agnes (born: before 1300; died: before 1349), married Henry of Werdenberg-Sargans-Trochtelfingen

=== Second marriage ===
Eberhard's second wife was Margaret, a daughter of Duke Frederick III of Lorraine. From this marriage, Eberhard had a son:

- Ulrich III (born: between 1286 and 1291; died: 11 July 1344), Count of Württemberg from 1325 to 1344

=== Third marriage ===
Eberhard's third wife was Irmengard, a daughter of Margrave Rudolph I of Baden-Baden. From this marriage, Eberhard had three daughters:

- Agnes (born: around 1295; died: 1317), countess by marriage of Oettingen
- Adelaide Matilda (born: between 1295 and 1300; died: 3 September 1342), married Kraft II of Hohenlohe (d. 3 May 1344)
- Irmengard (born: after 1300; died: 1329), countess by marriage of Hohenberg

=== Illegitimate ===
The clergyman Ulrich von Höfingen is believed to have been an illegitimate son of Eberhard's.

Eberhard I, Count of Württemberg House of Württemberg Born: 13 March 1265 Died: 5 June 1325
Preceded by Ulrich II	Count of Württemberg; 1279–1325	Succeeded by Ulrich III
