= Pfleiderer (surname) =

Pfleiderer is a surname of German origin.

== People with the surname ==
- Carl Paul Pfleiderer (1881–1960), German mechanical engineer
- Deborah Hoch-Pfleiderer (1860–1945), missionary wife in India
- Edmund Pfleiderer (1842–1902), German philosopher
- Matthias Pfleiderer (born 1995), German gymnast
- Otto Pfleiderer (1839–1908), German Protestant theologian

== See also ==
- Pfleiderer, company
