= Lenore Volz =

- Born: 16 March 1913; Waiblingen, Württemberg, Germany
- Died: 26 September 2009 (aged 96); Stuttgart, Baden-Württemberg, Germany
- Occupation(s): Lutheran theologian Lutheran minister
- Parent(s): Hugo Volz; Amalie Sixt

Lenore Volz (16 March 1913 – 26 September 2009) was a German Protestant theologian and one of the first women in Württemberg to work as a church minister. She was chair of the Women Theologians' Convent of the Evangelical-Lutheran Church in Württemberg.

== Early life ==
Lenore Volz was born in Waiblingen, a short distance from Stuttgart, and grew up in nearby Esslingen. She was the youngest of her parents' three recorded children. Hugo Volz, her father, had a well paid job in Esslingen as a tax official which enabled him to secure a good education for his children. Her mother, born Amalie Sixt, was an education pioneer who founded the first Lutheran "Mothers' School" ("Mütterschule") in Württemberg in 1928/29 and again, in the context of post-Nazi reconstruction, in 1945 "because there was literally nothing" ("weil es buchstäblich nichts gab").

Lenore Volz attended the girls' school in Esslingen and then moved on to the elite Königin-Katharina-Stift-Gymnasium (girls' secondary school) in Stuttgart. In preparation for her university studies she learned Latin, Greek and Hebrew. In 1933 she enrolled as a Theology student at Tübingen University. Tübingen was a major centre for her subject, with approximately 900 Theology students: around twelve of these were women. The next year she took over leadership of the "German Christian Women Students' Movement" ("Deutschen Christlichen Studentinnenbewegung"/ DCSB ). In 1935 she transferred for a year to Greifswald on Germany's northern coast. Back in Tübingen she successfully completed her studies in 1939. In September 1939, as war broke out, Lenore Volz began her theological internship at Münsingen. After six months she was unexpectedly transferred to nearby Cannstatt where in April 1940 she was appointed "parson's female assistant" ("Pfarrgehilfin"). Because all except the oldest the ministers had been conscripted for war service she found herself conducting services. Her formal status remained unclear, but congregations evidently accepted that she was able to conduct services and preach sermons as well as male colleagues. She was not permitted to conduct weddings or funerals, which remained male preserves. Children's services and work with women's and girls' groups were more typical of the "women's work" assigned to her, along with visiting of the elderly and sick. After the minister at the hospital was called up to serve the military she also took on hospital pastoral care.

Early in 1943 she passed her level 2 Theological Practicing Exam ("Theologische Dienstprüfung ") which came with the title "Pfarrvikarin" (loosely: "parson-vicar"). However, after war ended and surviving male ministers returned from the prisoner of war camps she, and other women ministers who had been filling the men's shoes, were no longer able to conduct services before full congregations, but restricted to traditional core areas such as religious instruction in those smaller groups, restricted to children, girls and women.

== Post-War ==
One change that could not be overlooked was the continuing shortage of male clergy due primarily, at this stage, to the slaughter of war. In 1948 the regional church passed a "Law on the service of women theologians" ("Gesetz über den Dienst der Theologinnen"). As a result, female theologians were formally admitted to full time ministry by the Evangelical-Lutheran Church in Württemberg. Their appointments remained subordinate ones, "dependent on the ordained parish officers" ("in Abhängigkeit vom ordinierten Pfarramt"), and the changes certainly did not deliver gender parity, but they did at the very least bring legal and financial improvements. It would need more thorough bible based theological groundwork to overcome significant residual doubts about women's ordination. By the end of the 1950s Lenore Volz would be one of the people engaged in that groundwork.

During the early 1950s Volz turned her focus to the inter-relationship between psychotherapy and pastoral care. She recognised the need for church ministers to incorporate the ground rules of psychology in their pastoral care, in order to be able to respond adequately to people's spiritual needs. The leading proponent of these ideas was the theologian Otto Haendler, a qualified psychotherapist and the professor for Practical Theology at the Humboldt University in (East) Berlin till his retirement in 1959. Volz began to attend Haendler's lectures on psychology and got to know him in the course of her follow-up studies with the "Doctor and Pastor" ("Arzt und Seelsorger") community. Haendler became her mentor as she pursued her psychological studies in greater depth, providing her with a study plan and reading recommendations. For her personal education on the topic she contacted Jutta von Graevenitz with whom she underwent analysis training.

The connection between psychology and theology, especially in the context of gender relations, was at the heart of Lenore Volz's life. From 1959 she turned her attention more directly to the issue of women's ordination, working closely on the theology and politics of the issue with Friedrich Lang, another Tübingen theologian. Presentations and discussions took place which raised the matter up the church agenda.

In December 1961 Volz held a church-theological working session in the deanery at Bad Cannstatt during the course of which she gave a presentation under the title, "Has the time not come to update the 1948 Law on women theologians?" (""Ist die Theologinnen-Ordnung von 1948 revisionsbedürftig?"). The question set a stone rolling. Over the next few years she devoted herself to the issue of equal rights for women theologians. Working with the "Women Theologians' Convent" ("Konvent evangelischer Theologinnen"), of which she became president in 1965, she published in 1967 "Women in the pulpits? A burning question for our church" (""Frauen auf der Kanzel? Eine brennende Frage unserer Kirchen""). This study became the template for a new "Law on the service of women theologians" ("Gesetz über den Dienst der Theologinnen"). After a deeply felt and moving debate it was adopted by the synod on 15 November 1968. The ordination of women was a reality. As Volz noted in her biography, women pastors were now permitted almost the same rights as male pastors.

By this time Lenore Volz was already 55, and instead of remaining in the mainstream church ministry she became a hospital pastor, and worked on ideas for another great reform, this time to put pastoral care in hospitals on a new footing. She retired ten years later, in 1978. That was also the year in which further adjustments were made as a result of which men and women working in parish ministry finally received completely equal status and treatment from the Evangelical-Lutheran Church in Württemberg. Even after her retirement she remained an active presence in evangelical church politics.
