= Hohenacker =

Coordinates: 48°52′02″N 9°18′55″E

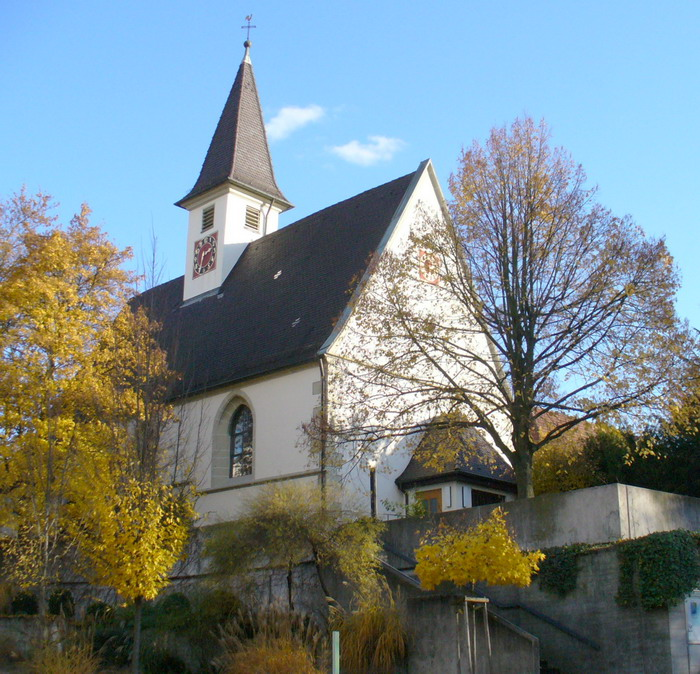
St. Erhart's church in Waiblingen-Hohenacker, built 1489

Hohenacker, once a town, is now part of Waiblingen, Baden-Württemberg, Germany.
