= Achim Pfuderer =

German footballer

Personal information
- Date of birth: 29 November 1975 (age 50)
- Place of birth: Waiblingen, West Germany
- Height: 1.88 m (6 ft 2 in)
- Position: Defender

Team information
- Current team: VfB Friedrichshafen

Youth career
- SV Poppenweiler
- VfB Stuttgart
- Stuttgarter Kickers

Senior career*
Years	Team	Apps	(Gls)
1994–2000	Stuttgarter Kickers	119	(6)
2000–2003	1860 Munich	29	(0)
2003–2004	Union Berlin	16	(0)
2004–2006	SV Elversberg	54	(6)
2006–2007	Darmstadt 98	17	(1)
2007–2008	SC Pfullendorf	10	(0)
2008–2009	VfB Friedrichshafen		
- * Club domestic league appearances and goals

Achim Pfuderer (born 29 November 1975 in Waiblingen) is a German former professional footballer who played as a defender. He made his debut on the professional league level in the 2. Bundesliga for Stuttgarter Kickers on 18 August 1996 when he came on as a half-time substitute in a game against VfB Oldenburg. He played three seasons in the Bundesliga for TSV 1860 Munich.
