= Waiblingen =

- Town
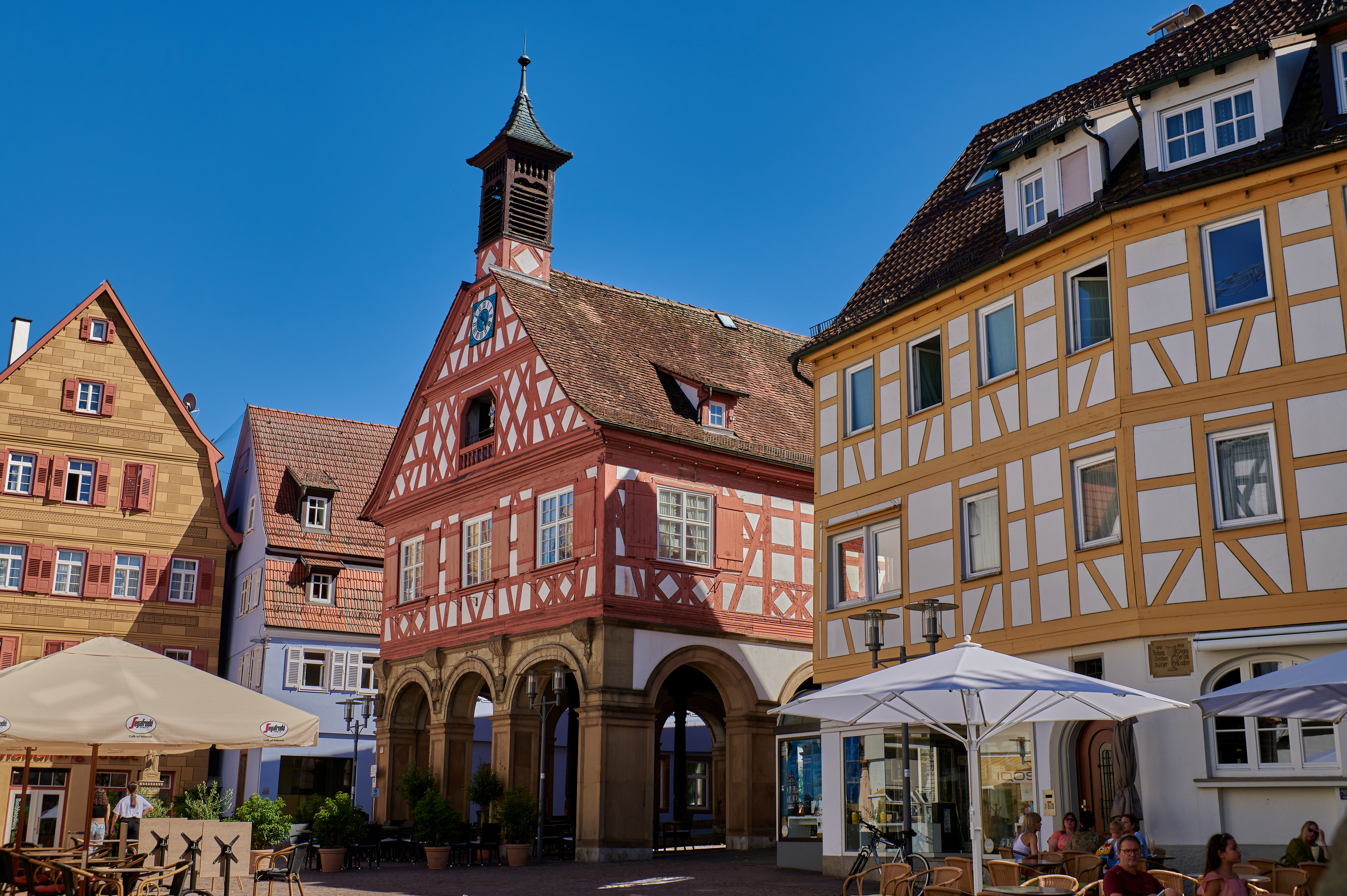
- Waiblingen

- Coat of arms

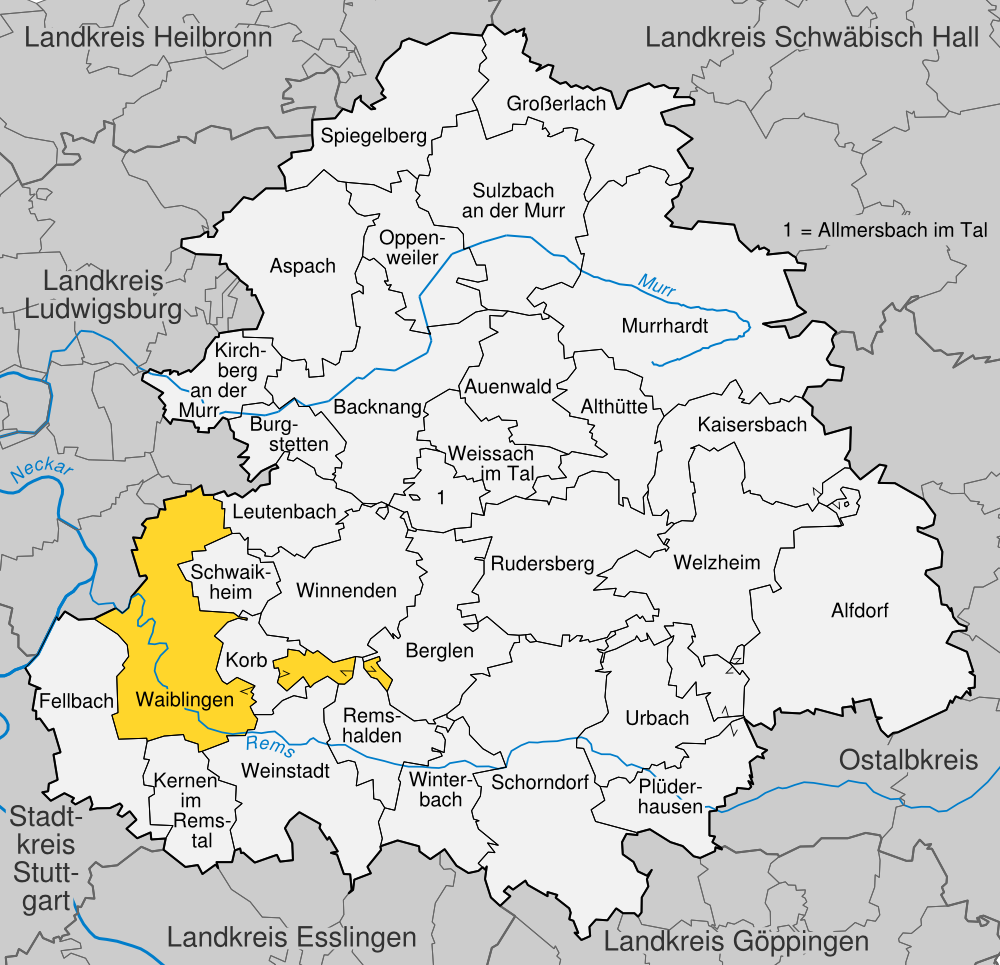
- Location of Waiblingen within Rems-Murr-Kreis district
- Interactive map of Waiblingen
- Location within Germany Location within Baden-Württemberg
- Coordinates: 48°49′49″N 09°19′01″E
- Country: Germany
- State: Baden-Württemberg
- Admin. region: Stuttgart
- District: Rems-Murr-Kreis

Government
  - Mayor (2022–30): Sebastian Wolf (CDU)

Area
  - Total: 42.75 km^{2} (16.51 sq mi)
- Elevation: 230 m (750 ft)

Population (2025-12-31)
  - Total: 57,186
  - Density: 1,338/km^{2} (3,465/sq mi)
- Time zone: UTC+01:00 (CET)
  - Summer (DST): UTC+02:00 (CEST)
- Postal codes: 71331–71336
- Dialling codes: 07151, 07146
- Vehicle registration: WN, BK
- Website: www.waiblingen.de

Waiblingen (German pronunciation: [ˈvaɪblɪŋən]; Swabian: Woiblinge) is a city in southwestern Germany, in the state of Baden-Württemberg. It lies in the eastern part of the Stuttgart metropolitan region on the river Rems, and is the seat and largest city of the Rems-Murr district. As of 16 October 2026, Waiblingen had 57,186 inhabitants in its central town and five outlying districts.

The settlement is of Alemannic origin and was a Carolingian royal estate, first documented in 885 during a stay by Emperor Charles the Fat. It later belonged to the Salian and then the Hohenstaufen dynasties; by tradition, the Hohenstaufen battle cry "Hie Waibling!" gave rise to the Italian term Ghibelline (Ghibellini), one of the two factions in the conflict between Guelphs and Ghibellines that divided medieval Europe. From the 13th century Waiblingen grew into a town under the Counts of Württemberg, to whose territory it would belong for the following centuries. It was almost entirely destroyed by imperial troops in 1634 during the Thirty Years' War, and its present old town with its colourful timber-framed houses largely dates from the following Baroque reconstruction.

The arrival of the railway in the late 19th century turned Waiblingen into an industrial centre, and its population grew steadily through the 20th century. It was raised to a major district town (Große Kreisstadt) in 1962 and became the administrative seat of the newly created Rems-Murr district in 1973. Waiblingen is the seat of Stihl, the world's largest manufacturer of chainsaws and the town's biggest employer.

== Etymology ==
Waiblingen is of Alemannic origin, designating a place (as indicated by the suffix -ingen) ruled by, or settled by the descendents of, someone probably named Wabilo or Wahilo. The name may also be related to Weibel, an archaic term for a ceremonial official (known as a huissier in other parts of Europe). In Old High German, the name was rendered as Uueibelingen, Uveibelingen, and Waipilinga.

== Geography ==
Waiblingen is bisected by the river Rems, which enters the district from the southeast near Beinstein, and then flows through the city center, including the eastern part of the old town. It subsequently cuts deep into the area's Muschelkalk limestone, and runs northwest in several meandering bends between the outlying districts of Neustadt, Hohenacker, and Hegnach, on its way to its confluence with the Neckar in Remseck.

The city of Waiblingen consists of the inner city of Waiblingen proper, and the outlying districts of Beinstein, Bittenfeld, Hegnach, Hohenacker, and Neustadt, which were incorporated during municipal reforms in 1971 and 1975. Each of these five districts has its own local council as defined by the Baden-Württemberg municipal code.

Due to urban expansion, modern Waiblingen is almost contiguous with its neighbouring towns of Fellbach in the west, Kernen in the south, and Korb in the east.

== History ==
=== Pre-history to early Middle Ages ===
The earliest archaeological finds in the area date from the Neolithic, as early as 5,000 BCE. In Hegnach, excavations found a Celtic burial site from the Hallstatt culture, dated between 650–450 BCE (Hallstatt C). Between 155 and 260, Waiblingen lay just inside the borders of the Roman Empire in the province of Germania Superior; the nearest border defenses of the Limes in Welzheim were only about 25 kilometers away. Near Beinstein, the remains of a Roman artisan's village were found, producing earthenware and ceramics which were traded in a range of up to 100 kilometers.

Little evidence exists for Waiblingen's history during and after the fall of the Western Roman Empire, a time known as the Migration Period. Writing in 1666, local chronicler Wolfgang Zacher relates that older sources spoke of the town being destroyed in around 450 by Huns which were part of Attila's forces. The town was part of the tribal confederation of the Alemanni between the 5th and 8th century, who were gradually christianized and subjugated by the Franks, until Carloman summarily executed all Alemannic nobility at the blood court at Cannstatt in 746. Waiblingen's mother church dates from this period; the fact that it was dedicated to the archangel Michael – one of the main holy figures venerated by the Franks – is taken by some scholars to be an indication of the town's importance at the time. Remains of the original church were found underneath the 15th-century Michael's Church (Michaelskirche), which occupies its place today.

=== High and late Middle Ages ===
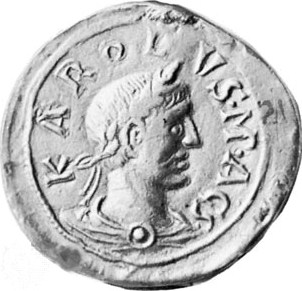
Seal of Charles the Fat

By the 9th century, Waiblingen had become an important religious, economic, and administrative center in the region. This is evidenced by the erection of a Kaiserpfalz ("imperial palace") in the town by Carolingian rulers. While no archaeological evidence for this palace has been found, it is theorized to have been located in the area of the Rathausplatz (city hall square). Chronicler Wolfgang Zacher asserts that emperor Charlemagne visited Waiblingen in 801, although there is no contemporary evidence for such a visit. The first documentary evidence both for Waiblingen's existence, and its Kaiserpfalz, comes from the reign of Charlemagne's great-grandson Charles the Fat. In 885, Charles and his itinerant court stayed in Waiblingen for several days: on 23 August 885, the emperor signed a royal charter as "Actum ad Uueibelingan curta imperiali" – "Done at Waiblingen, imperial estate". (Note: While the 885 dating is generally accepted, local historian Joachim Peterke argues that Charles' documents do not constitute incontrovertible evidence, since they could conceivably have referred to other towns also named Waiblingen (such as Waiblingen near Aalen, and Waibling near Straubing). Peterke notes that the charters involve parties and issues several hundred miles distant from Waiblingen, and that no archaeological evidence has been found for a supposed Kaiserpfalz.) The last East Frankish ruler of the Carolingian dynasty, Louis the Child, also signed an act in Waiblingen in December 908, after which there is no further documentary evidence for roughly 140 years.

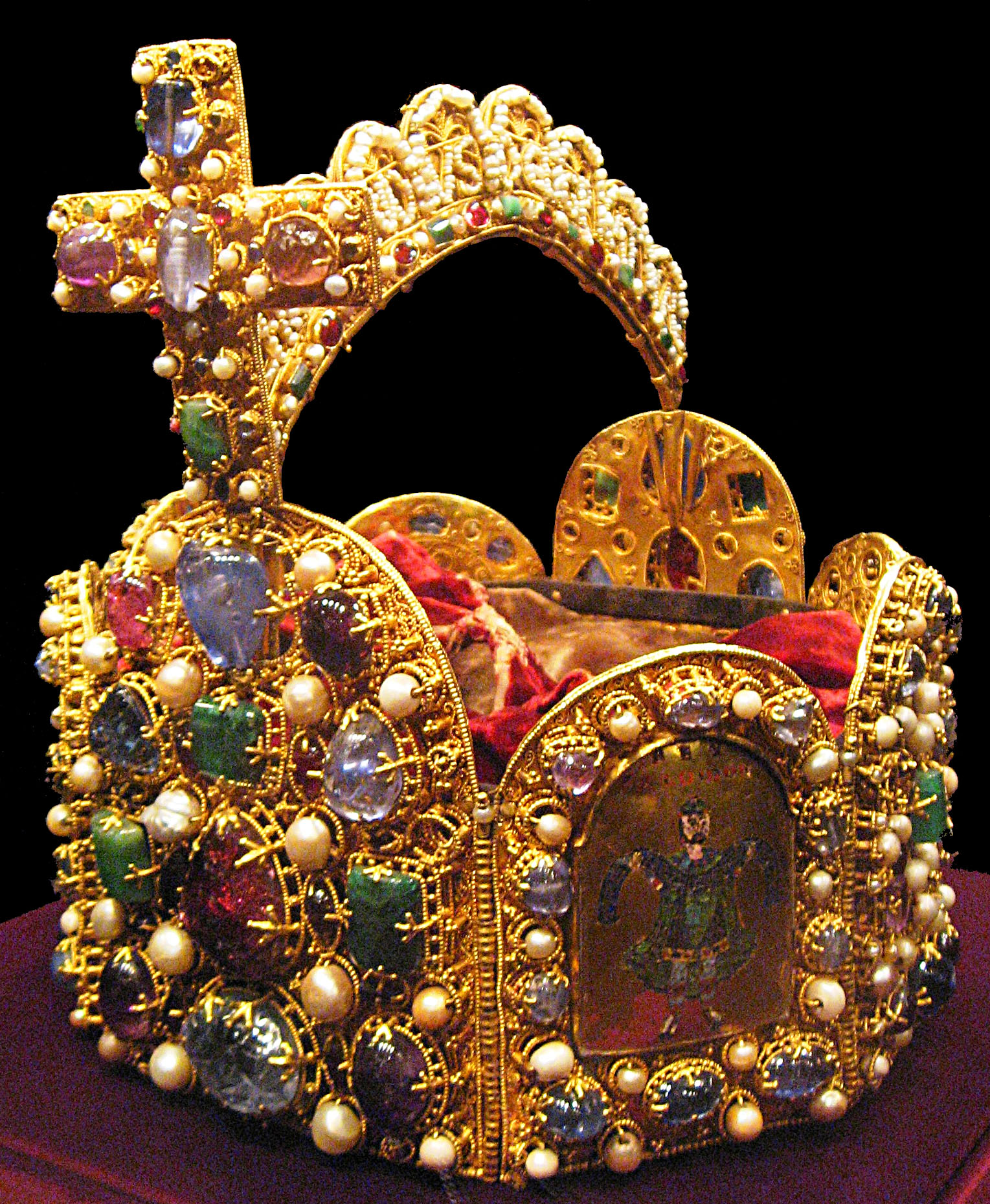
Crown of Conrad II, Holy Roman Emperor

After the Carolingian period, Waiblingen passed by inheritance through the dukes of Swabia to Gisela of Swabia, whose marriage to Conrad II brought the estate into the Salian dynasty when Conrad was elected King of Germany in 1024; he would be crowned Holy Roman Emperor in 1027. The Salian emperors of the following century – Conrad's son Henry III, grandson Henry IV, and great-grandson Henry V – were recorded by 12th-century chronicler Otto of Freising as having been called the "Henrys of Waiblingen". The town reached the height of its importance under Henry IV during the Investiture Controversy, when it served as an imperial fortress. In 1080 he donated Waiblingen, together with neighbouring Winterbach, to Speyer Cathedral, burial church of the Salian dynasty. The Hohenstaufen acquired the town through Agnes of Waiblingen, daughter of Henry IV, who married Duke Frederick I of Swabia, and they inherited the Salian lands after the male line died out with Henry V in 1125.

The rivalry between the Hohenstaufens of Waiblingen and the rival house of Welf gave its name to the conflict between the Guelphs and Ghibellines, one of the defining political divisions of medieval Europe. According to later chroniclers, both houses' names were first used as opposing battle cries at the siege of Weinsberg in 1140, in which the Welf shouts of "Hie Welf!" were answered by Hohenstaufen troops with "Hie Waibling!", the name of their nearby fortress. While this origin is considered plausible, it rests on relatively late sources. As the conflict between the Hohenstaufen and the Welfs spread into imperial Italy, the battle cries became shorthand for both factions – reshaped in Italian as Ghibellini and Guelfi, with Ghibellino deriving from "Waiblingen". The factions reached their height during the struggle between Emperor Frederick II and the papacy in the 13th century and persisted long after the original dynastic quarrel – and its connection to the small Swabian town – had been forgotten.

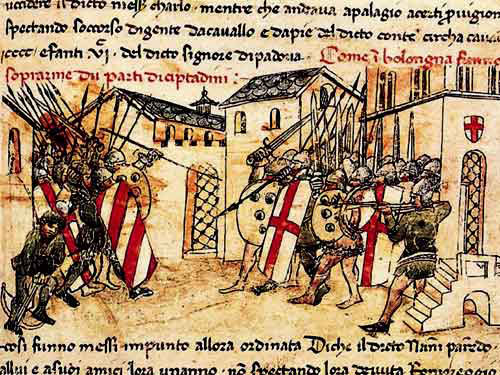
Depiction of a fight between the militias of the Guelf and Ghibelline factions

Through the 13th century Waiblingen gradually developed from a village into a town under the Counts of Württemberg. The first secure evidence of a Württemberg presence dates from 1253, and grants of land in and around Waiblingen multiply through the 1260s and 1270s. By 1265 at the latest, Waiblingen had been elevated to a city, and indicators of an emerging regional center appear in the same period, including "urban" trades such as butchers and, by 1273, a community of citizens (universitas civium) headed by a Schultheiß (bailiff). Waiblingen's earliest town seal survives on a charter of 1291 and bears the three stag's antlers of the Counts of Württemberg, which survive in the city's coat of arms today.

By 1297, the Counts of Württemberg had built a castle at the eastern edge of the city, in the area of today's Rathausplatz. The castle was likely a simple fortified building with a rectangular layout and 5-meter-high walls, topped with a timber frame structure. It survived with multiple alterations until 1634. Around 1300, Waiblingen was drawn into the wars between Count Eberhard I and the Habsburg and Roman kings, who valued its position at the Rems crossing on a long-distance route between Franconia and Lake Constance. The crown established a rival settlement, Neu-Waiblingen (the modern district of Neustadt), on a nearby hilltop as a deliberate check on Württemberg ambitions, first documented in 1298.

=== Early modern era ===
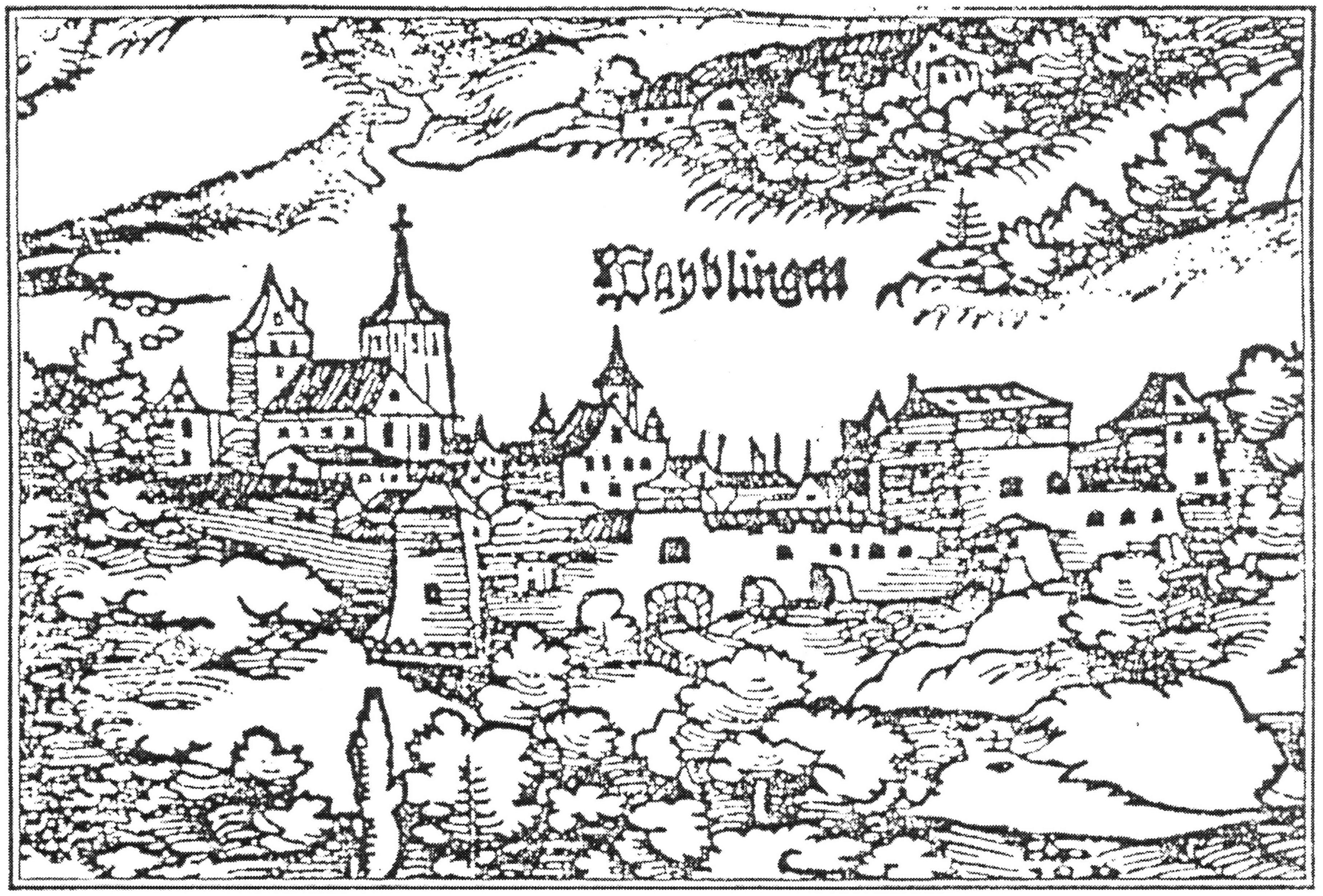
Waiblingen around 1535, the only surviving depiction of the town's castle

Waiblingen was a favoured residence of the Counts of Württemberg through the first half of the 15th century. The family lived periodically at Waiblingen's castle: several counts were born here, among them Ludwig II (born 1439), and the future Duke Eberhard II (born 1447); Waiblingen twice served as the dower (Wittum) of a count's wife. After Count Ulrich V was captured and held for a large ransom in his war against the Electoral Palatinate, the town was pledged to the Palatinate from 1463 until 1491. The recently founded University of Tübingen took refuge in Waiblingen during an outbreak of plague in 1482/83. The town's oldest surviving buildings date from the 15th century, such as the Michaelskirche (Michael's Church, ~1445), Nikolauskirche (Saint Nicholas' Church, after 1480), and the Beinsteiner Torturm (Beinstein Gate Tower, 1491); the latter was adorned with the arms of Count Eberhard V, who was elevated to Duke of Württemberg in 1495. In 1514, Waiblingen saw unrest during a regional revolt against Duke Ulrich, known collectively as Poor Conrad. A confrontation between Imperial Knights and rebelling Waiblingen citizens is relayed by participant Götz von Berlichingen in his autobiography.

Following Duke Ulrich's return from exile in 1534, the Reformation swept into Waiblingen, carried out in the town by its Vogt (bailiff), Lienhart Schlaher. During the Schmalkaldic War, Imperial and Spanish troops under Charles V occupied much of Württemberg in 1546–47, but Waiblingen was at first left untouched. When Spanish troops at last advanced on the town from three sides on 23 March 1548, Schlaher chose not to resist and opened the gates; the resulting nine-week occupation cost the town some provisions but no lives or buildings. His decision drew accusations of treachery and ultimately cost him his office and family.

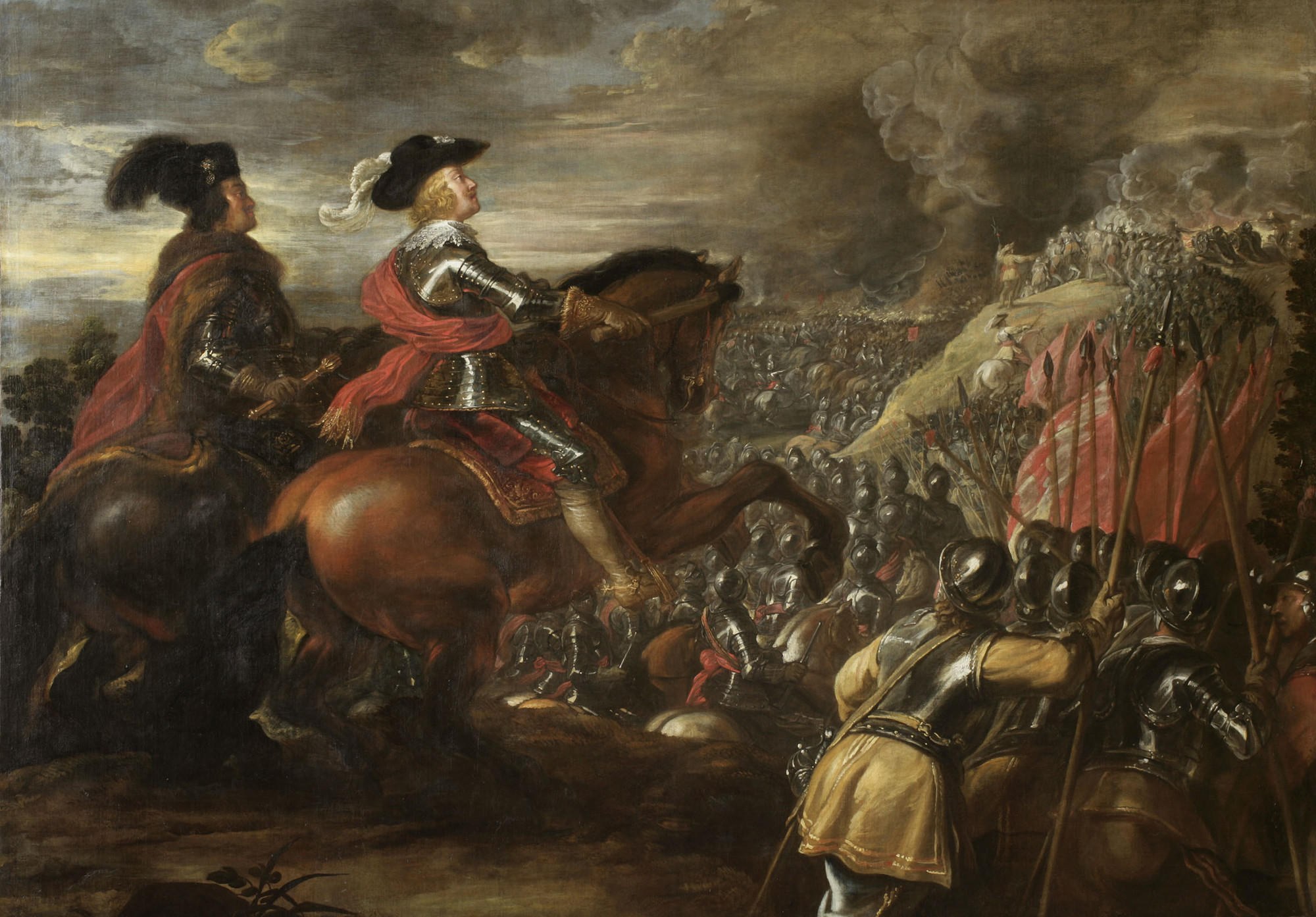
Jan van der Hoecke The Battle of Nördlingen, 1634

In stark contrast to 1548, Waiblingen was almost completely destroyed in 1634 during the Thirty Years' War. After their victory over the Swedes at the Battle of Nördlingen, Imperial and Spanish troops of Ferdinand II stormed and burned Waiblingen on 19 September 1634; the town, its two suburbs, and the parish church were reduced almost entirely to ashes. Local chronicler Wolfgang Zacher relates that the town's population fell from about 1,300 in 1634 to roughly 100 by 1639. The devastation was so complete that when Matthäus Merian published the Swabian volume of his atlas Topographia Germaniae in 1643, he was unable to provide a view of Waiblingen, noting that all but five houses had been destroyed. Rebuilding began in 1640, but advanced slowly due to lack of funds; even 75 years after its sacking, the town had only regained about 60 percent of its former buildings and half its population. The core of the present-day old town dates from this reconstruction between roughly 1640 and 1700. Among the resettling citizens was baker Caspar Schiller (1623–1695), great-great-grandfather of poet and playwright Friedrich Schiller, whose father Johann Kaspar Schiller was also born just north of Waiblingen, in Bittenfeld.

Depictions of Waiblingen in the 17th century
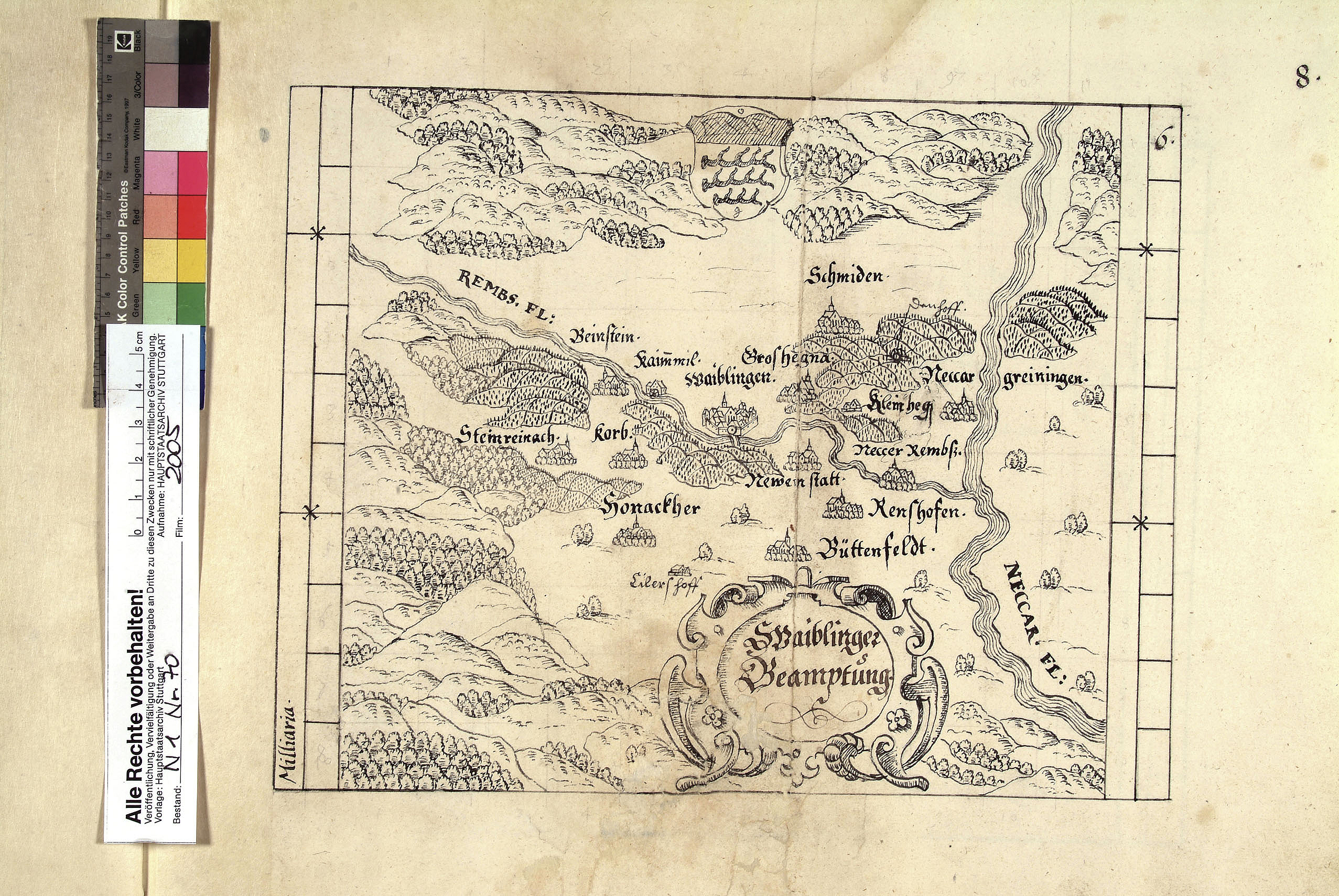
Waiblingen around 1605 (facing southwest)

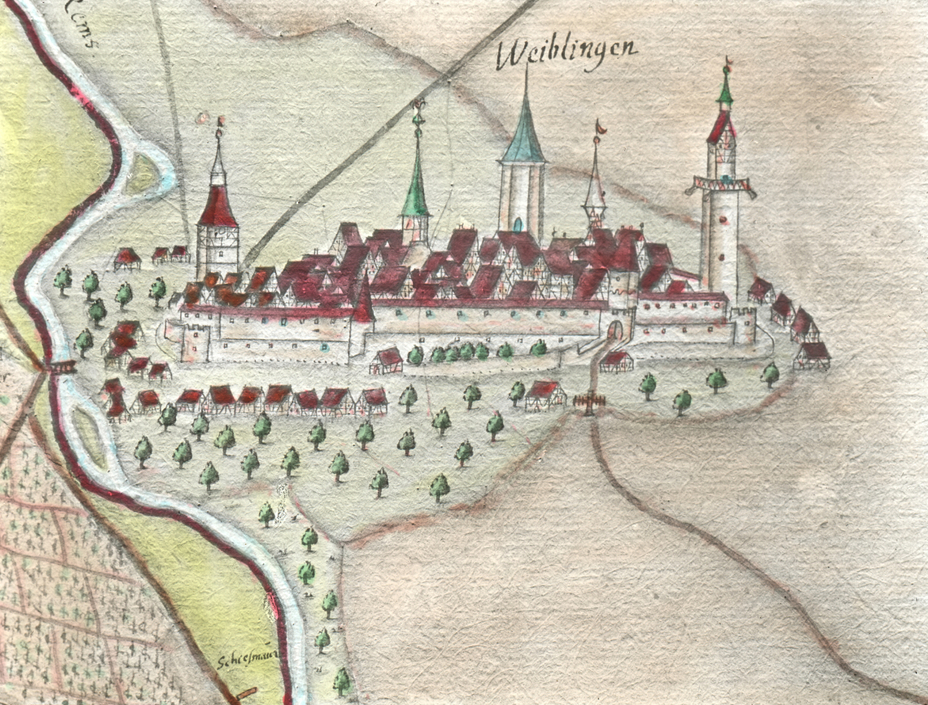
Waiblingen in 1680 (facing south)

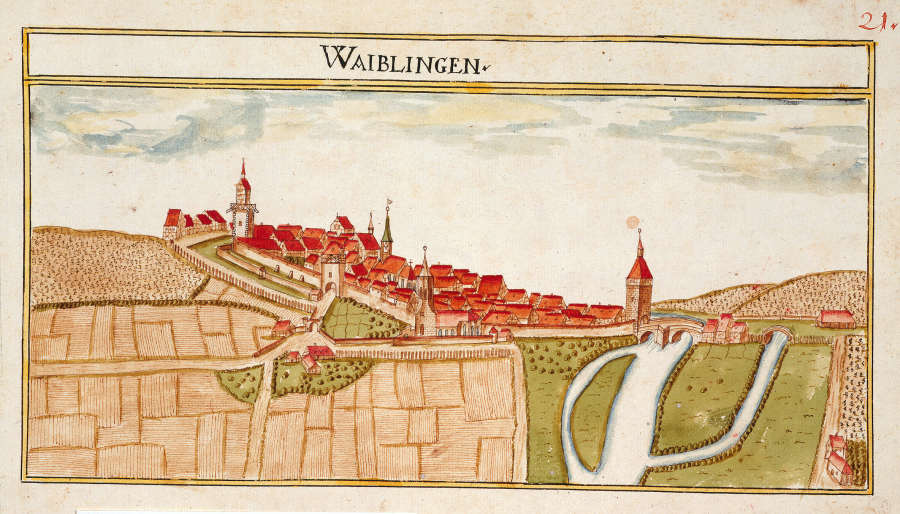
Waiblingen in 1685 (facing north)

=== Modern era ===
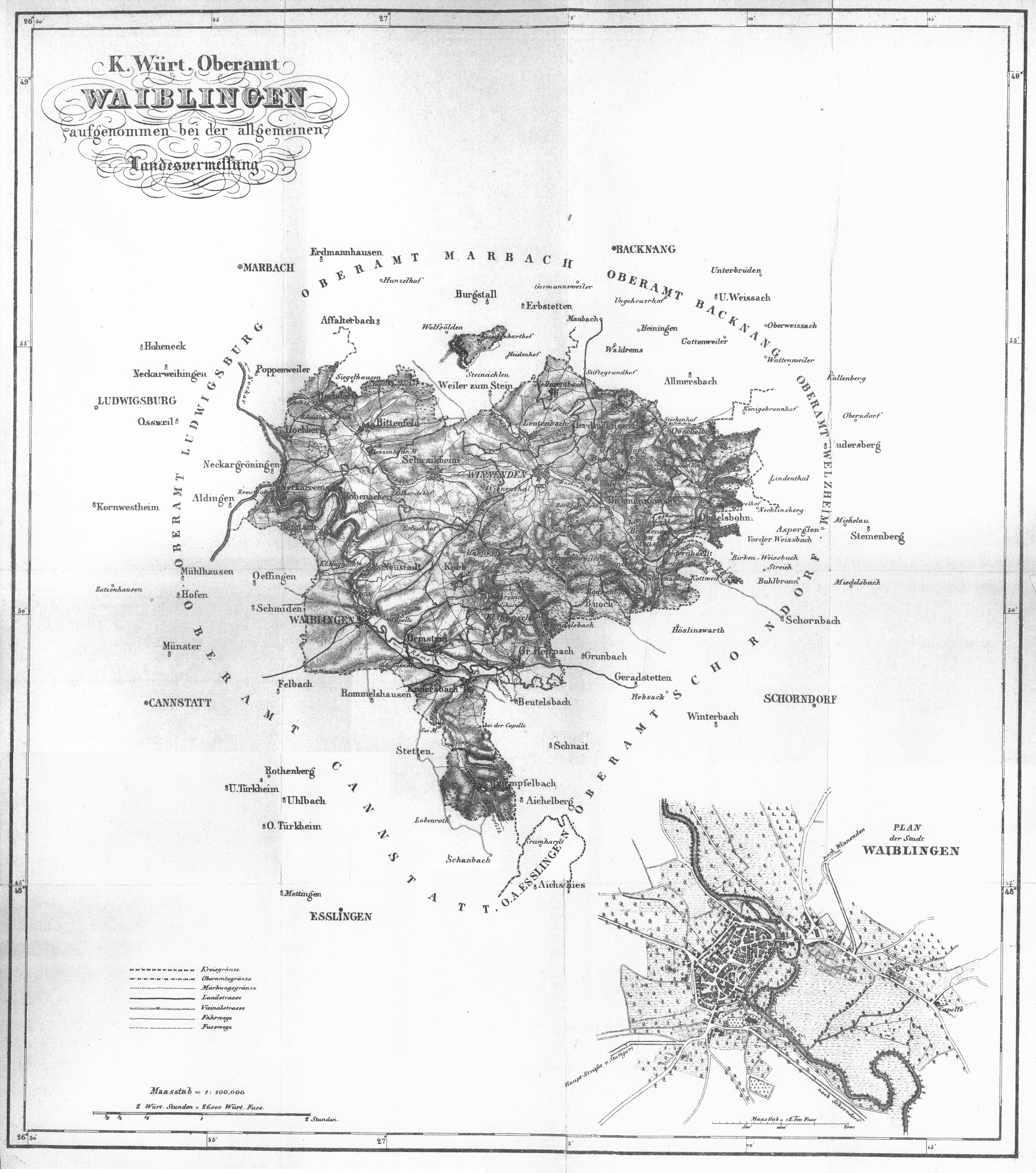
Map of Waiblingen town and district, 1850

Waiblingen did not regain its pre-Thirty Years' War size until the end of the 18th century, with about 2,269 inhabitants in 1800. In 1820, visiting poet Achim von Arnim – who had set his novel Die Kronenwächter (The Crown Keepers) in Waiblingen – found the town disappointing, as it had lost the medieval charm he had expected. During the 19th century, Waiblingen remained part of the Duchy of Württemberg, whose status changed dramatically during the Napoleonic era. Allied with France, its ruler Frederick I was elevated to King in 1806; in the administrative reorganization of the new kingdom, Waiblingen became the seat of an Oberamt (district), formed in 1808 from the older Württemberg districts of Waiblingen and Winnenden and assigned to the Neckarkreis (Neckar district). In 1861, the Remsbahn (Rems railway) from Cannstatt towards Aalen was opened, giving Waiblingen a station, and the branch line towards Backnang and Schwäbisch Hall followed in 1876, making the town a railway junction and emerging industrial center. Factories producing such varied goods as bricks, silk fabrics, fly-catchers, throat lozenges, and noodles settled in the town.

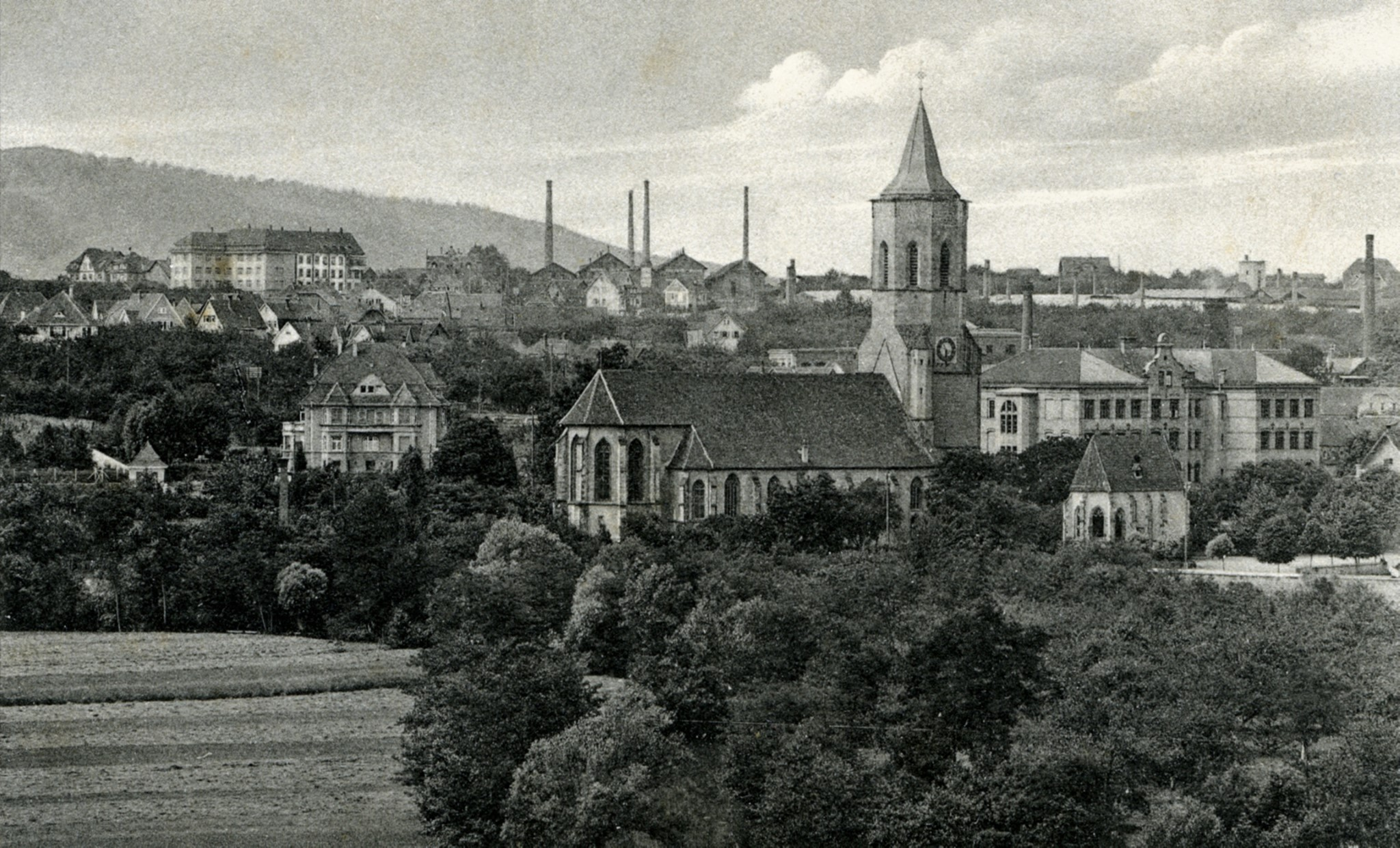
View of the town around 1920, Michael's Church in the center

During World War I, 238 soldiers from Waiblingen died, out of a total population of about 7,000. As early as 1915, the town had to implement a system of food rationing, and in 1917, two bells of Michael's Church were melted down to support the war effort. While the town was not a stronghold of Nazism in the 1920s – the Nazi Party logged relatively modest vote tallies in federal and local elections – by 1933, Waiblingen had been brought in line, and Jews, political opponents, and minority groups were subsequently marginalized, imprisoned, and deported. The Postplatz, a main square south of the old town, was renamed Adolf-Hitler-Platz in March 1933, and two schools were renamed after Hitler and Horst Wessel in 1936. Out of a population of about 11,000, 552 soldiers died during World War II, but the city itself remained largely undamaged. Waiblingen was given up without a fight to advancing American troops on 21 April 1945.

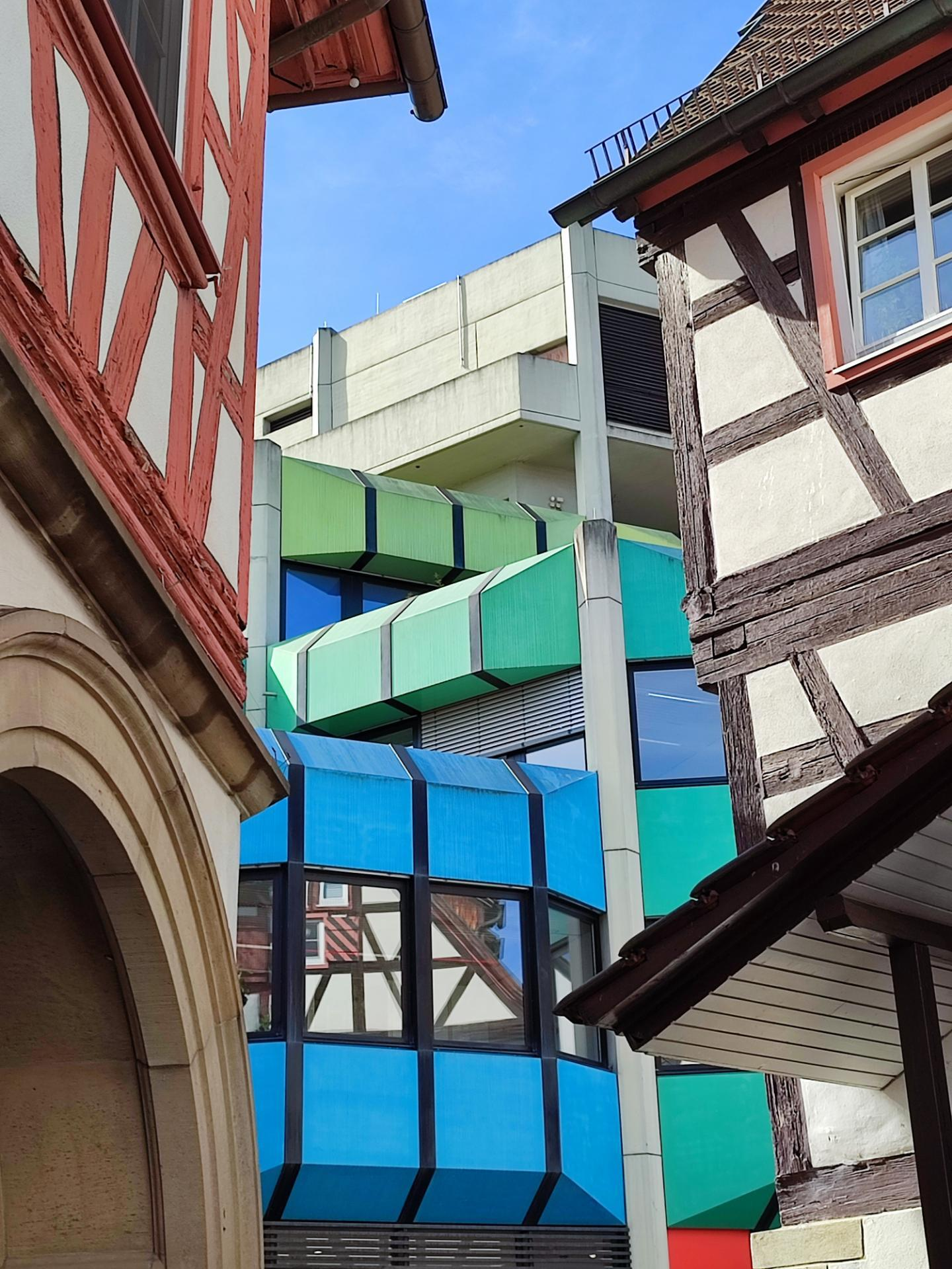
The Marktdreieck behind timber-framed buildings

By 1960, Waiblingen had reached a population of 20,000, leading to its elevation to a Große Kreisstadt (major district town) by 1962. Further municipal reforms incorporated neighbouring towns such as Beinstein and Neustadt. Waiblingen became the administrative center of the newly-created Rems-Murr-Kreis district in 1973.

In 1976, the inner city saw the erection of its most controversial new building, the Marktdreieck (market triangle). Designed on a triangular base, the multi-storey building features a tapering concrete skeleton structure with a facade of multicoloured aluminum sheets, the style of which was described as "pop brutalism". While derided as an ill-fitting "UFO" after its construction, the Marktdreieck received cultural heritage status in 2014. The building houses a public library and multiple businesses.

In 2019, Waiblingen was one of 16 cities participating in the Grünprojekt Remstal (green project Rems valley) as part of the Landesgartenschau (Regional Garden Show). The city revamped several of its green spaces, chiefly on the Remsinsel (Rems island) immediately to the east of the inner city.

== Landmarks ==
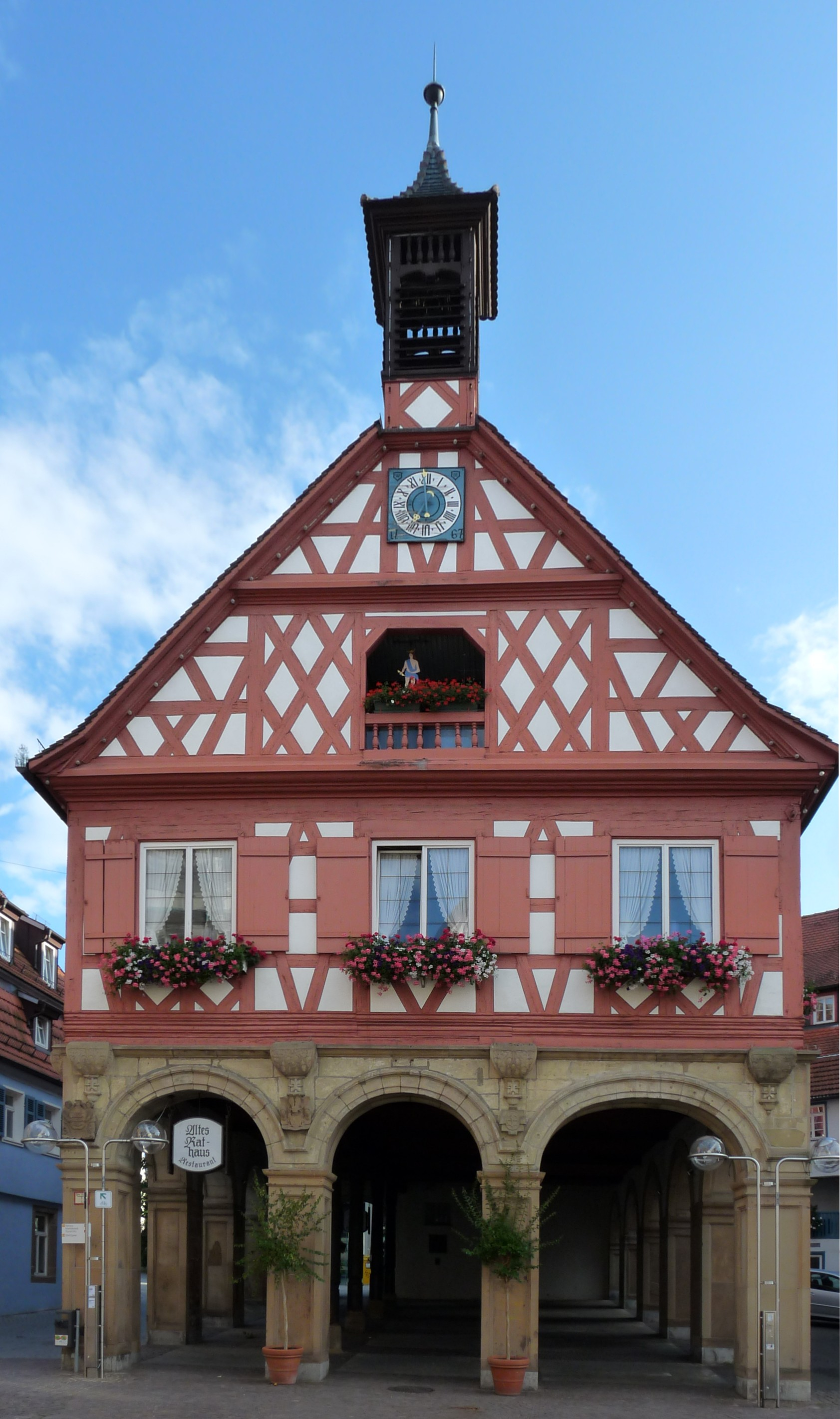
Altes Rathaus

Waiblingen's historic center lies on the west bank of the Rems river, encompassed by the remains of the 13th-century city wall. Due to the city's destruction during the Thirty Years' War, most historic residential buildings date from the Baroque (1650–1750). The old town contains many colourful timber-framed houses, especially around the Marktplatz (market square) which marks the center of old town. Buildings of note include:

- Altes Rathaus (Old City Hall) on the Marktplatz. Foundations of the current structure date from 1597, but it was destroyed in 1634 and not rebuilt until 1730. It was used as the city hall until 1875, after which it became a boy's school. The building has an elaborate clock with moving figures set into its front.
- Hochwachtturm (High Watch Tower). Erected at the highest point of old town, a first tower may have been built as early as the 11th century, and it was heightened several times in subsequent centuries. The structure was used as a watchtower until the 17th century, with the watchmen and their families living at the top of the tower. The building can be visited today and provides a panoramic view of the town.
- Beinsteiner Torturm (Beinstein Gate Tower). The only remaining gate of the medieval battlements, the other gate towers having been demolished in the 1830s. The 22-meter tower is topped with a timber-frame structure, and housed a small prison until the mid-19th century. It features the arms of Count Eberhard I from 1491, and a Nazi-era sgraffito from 1938 of idealized Hohenstaufen knights and a heroic standard-bearer. It is also near the Talaue, a recreational area in the wetlands along the Rems.
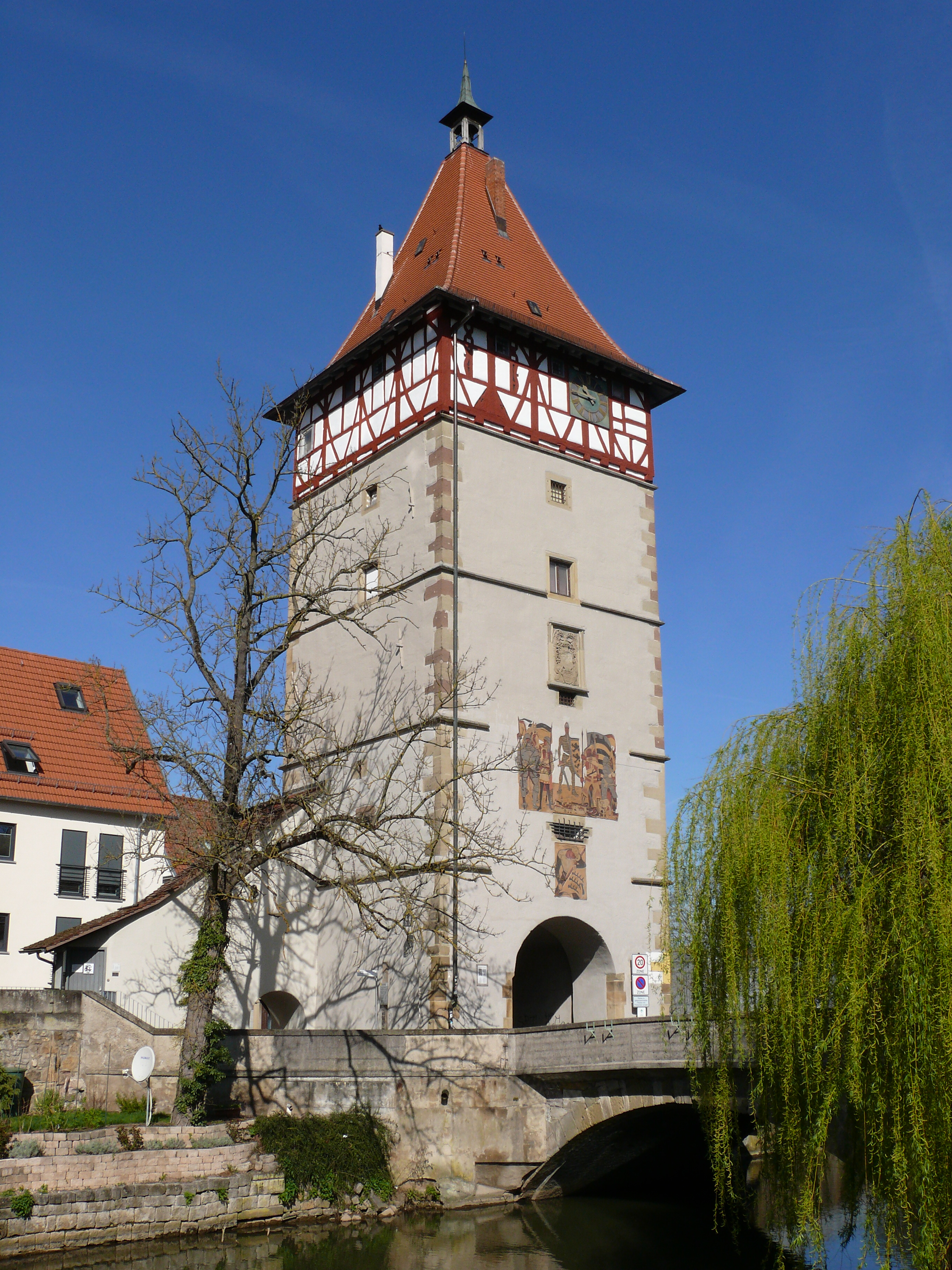
  Beinsteiner Torturm
- Stadtmauer (City Wall). Waiblingen's inner city was fully encircled by a city wall, whose first iteration was likely built over several decades in the mid-13th century; it was expanded and heightened several times until the 17th century. The wall varied in height between 6 and 12 meters, and featured a raised and covered walkway (chemin de ronde) behind the battlements. About 750 meters of the 1000-meter wall still exist, partially overbuilt by houses. Parts of the battlements on the eastern side of the town can be walked. One of the wall's guard towers was briefly used as a Karzer (student's prison) in the late 15th century.
- Michaelskirche (Michael's Church). Built in the second half of the 15th century, the church is in the late Gothic style with a massive, Bergfried-like 52-meter bell tower. Unusually, it had its own fortifications as it was located outside the city walls, resulting in it being commonly called Äußere Kirche (Outer Church). It was erected on the remains of at least three previous churches.
- Haus der Stadtgeschichte (House of the City's History). The city's oldest surviving residential building was built in 1550 outside of the city walls and housed a tanner's workshop; it escaped the destruction of 1634. Today it is Waiblingen's main historical museum, presenting objects as old as 2,000 years.
- Fachwerkhäuser (timber-framed houses) in the inner city. The old town features dozens of imposing burgher houses from the 17th and 18th century in the Baroque style. One of the finest examples is the six-storey Am Marktplatz 1 from around 1690, which housed the Oberamtsgericht (district court) from 1819 to 1909, and during the tenure of judge and literary patron Karl Mayer was regularly visited by poets such as Eduard Mörike, Nikolaus Lenau, and Justinus Kerner.
- Galerie Stihl (Stihl Gallery). Built 2006–2008 at the banks of the Rems river, it houses an exhibition space specializing in printed works of art. Its rotating exhibitions have featured artists such as J. M. W. Turner, Rembrandt, Albrecht Dürer, Pablo Picasso, Francisco Goya, and Henri de Toulouse-Lautrec. The gallery was designed in a hypermodern minimalist style in deliberate contrast to the town's historic buildings by architect Hartwig Schneider; it was nominated for the European Union Prize for Contemporary Architecture in 2008. The entrance to the gallery features a large sculpture by Danish artist Olafur Eliasson. The building was funded by, and is named for, the Stihl family.
Waiblingen landmarks
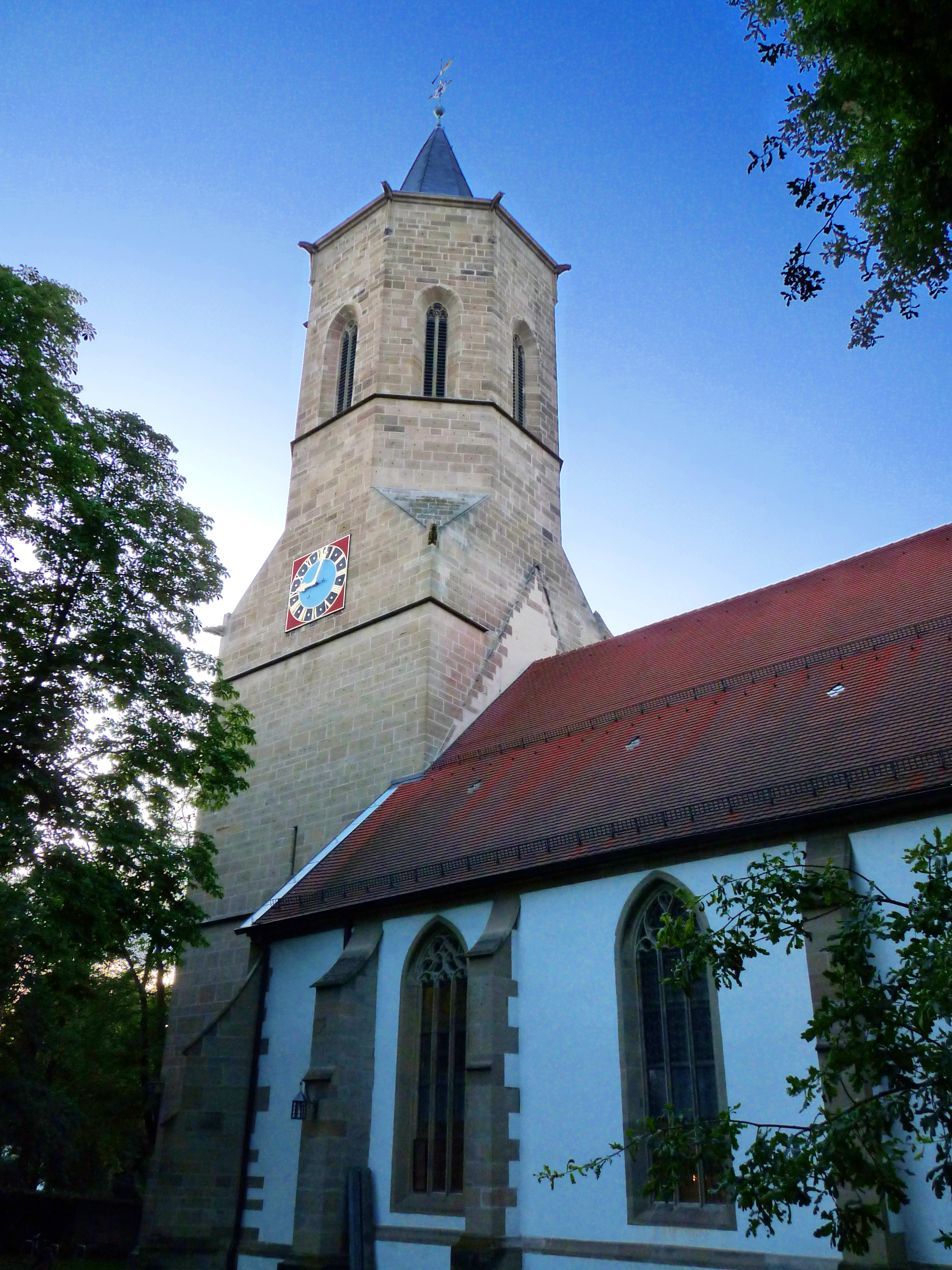
Michael's Church

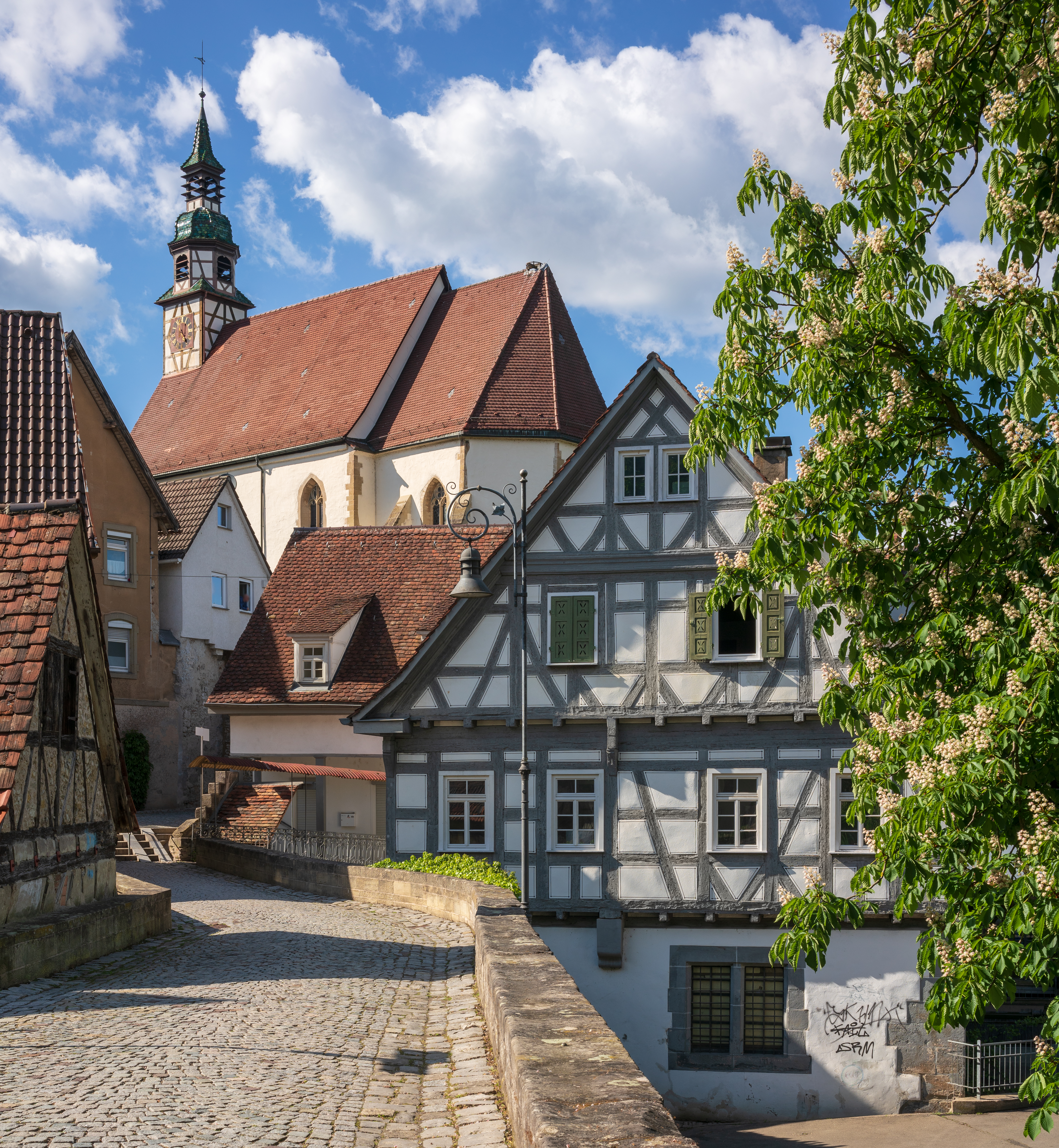
St Nicholas' Church

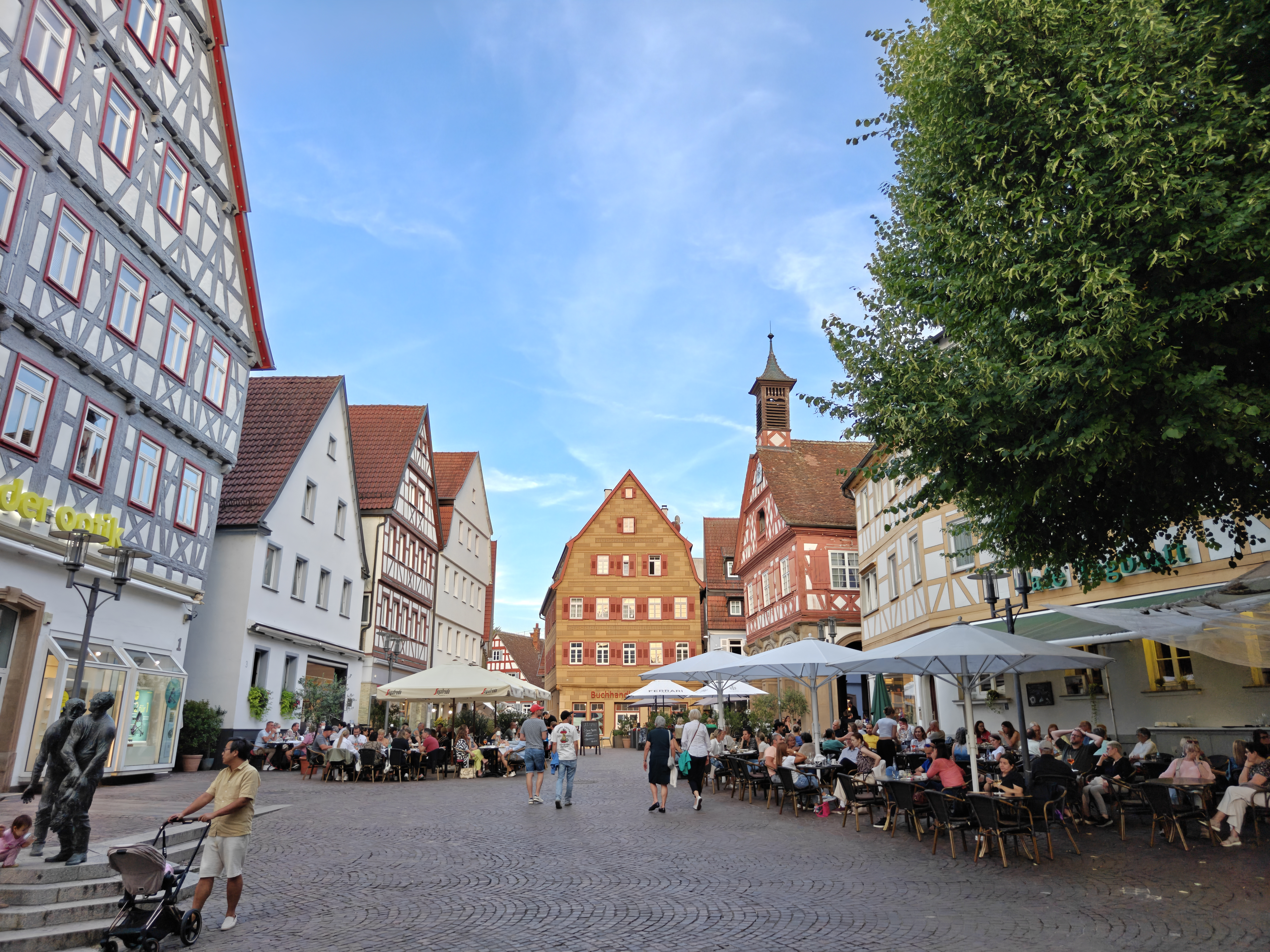
Market square

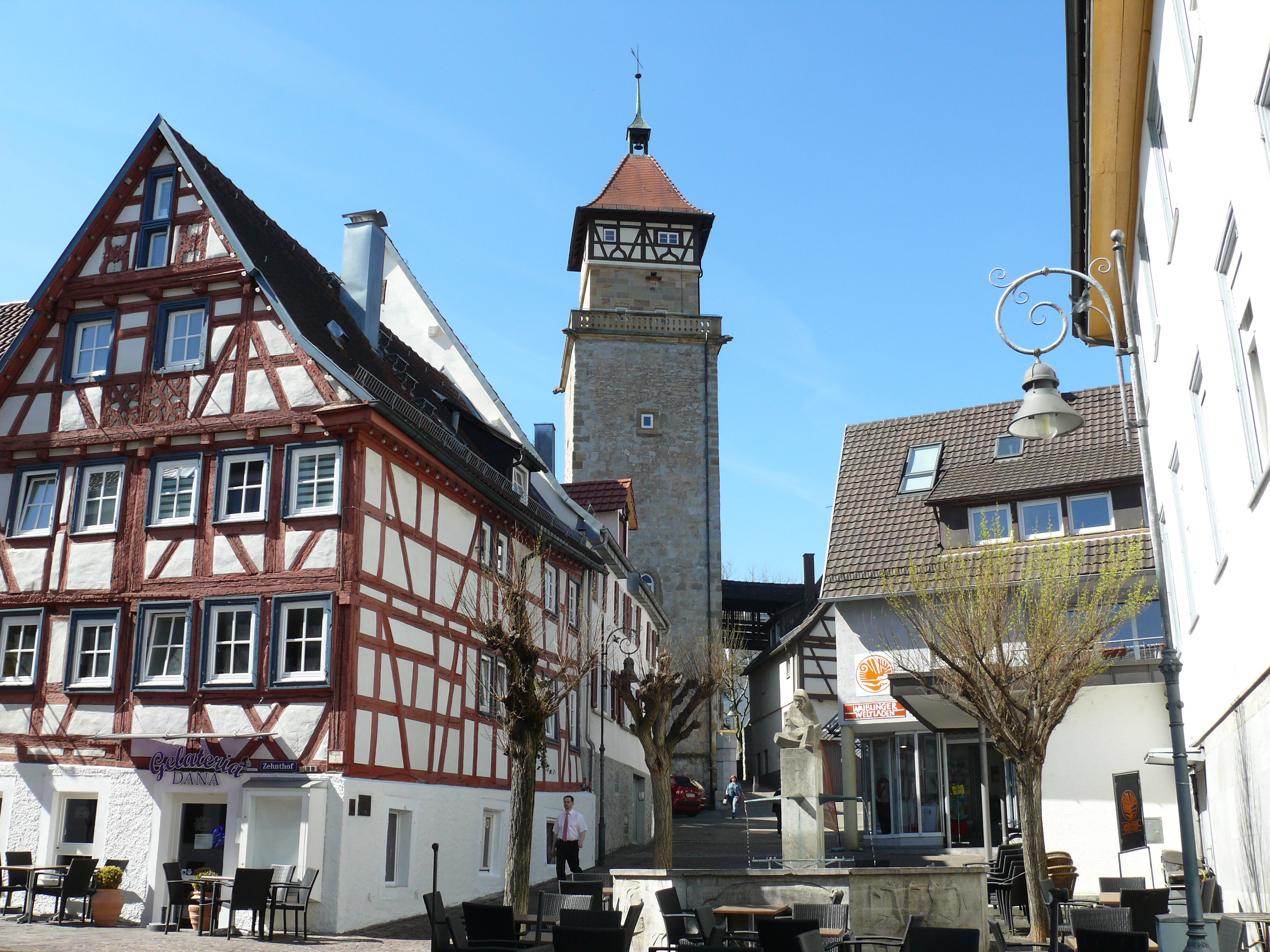
Hochwachtturm

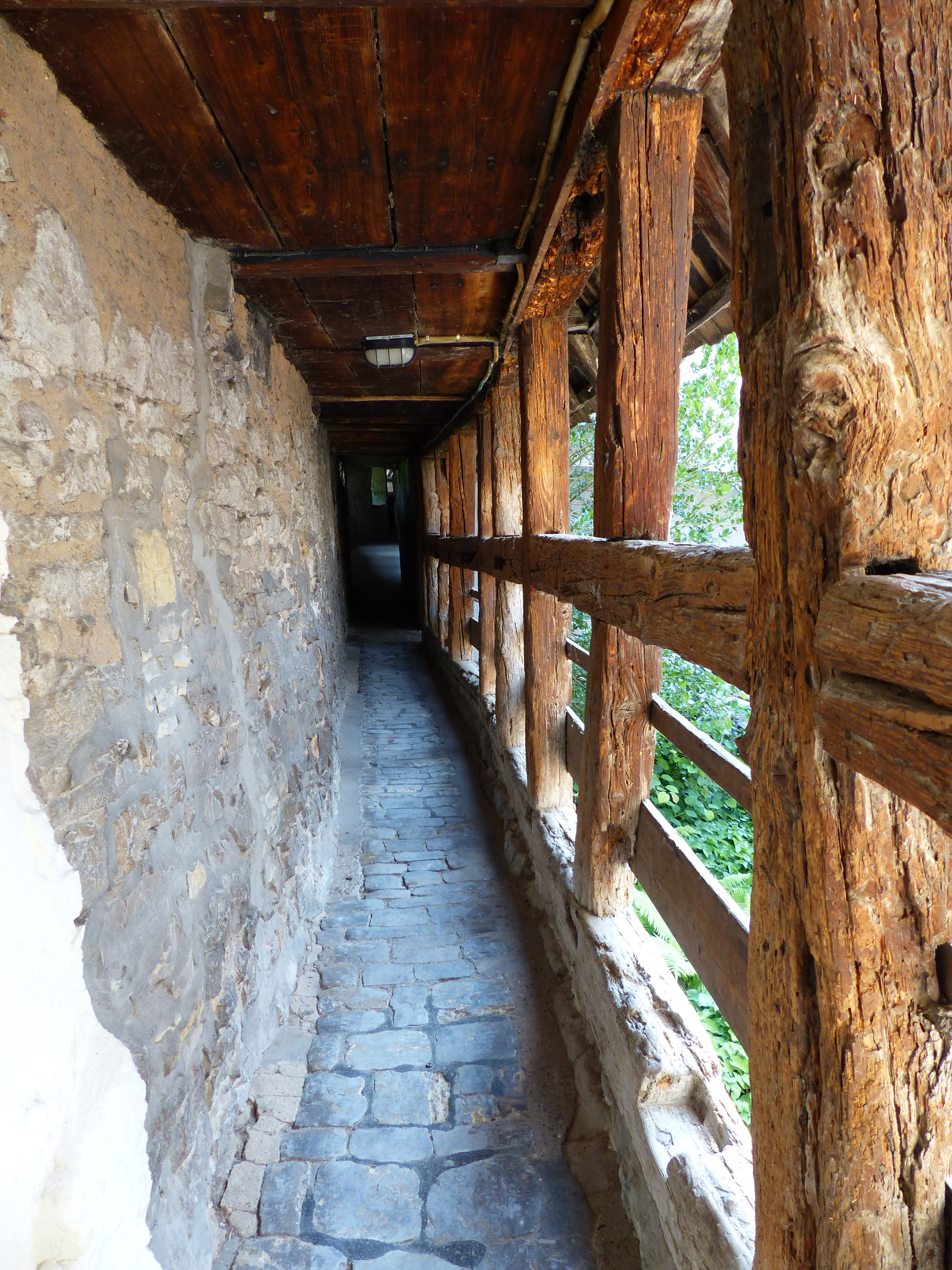
City wall

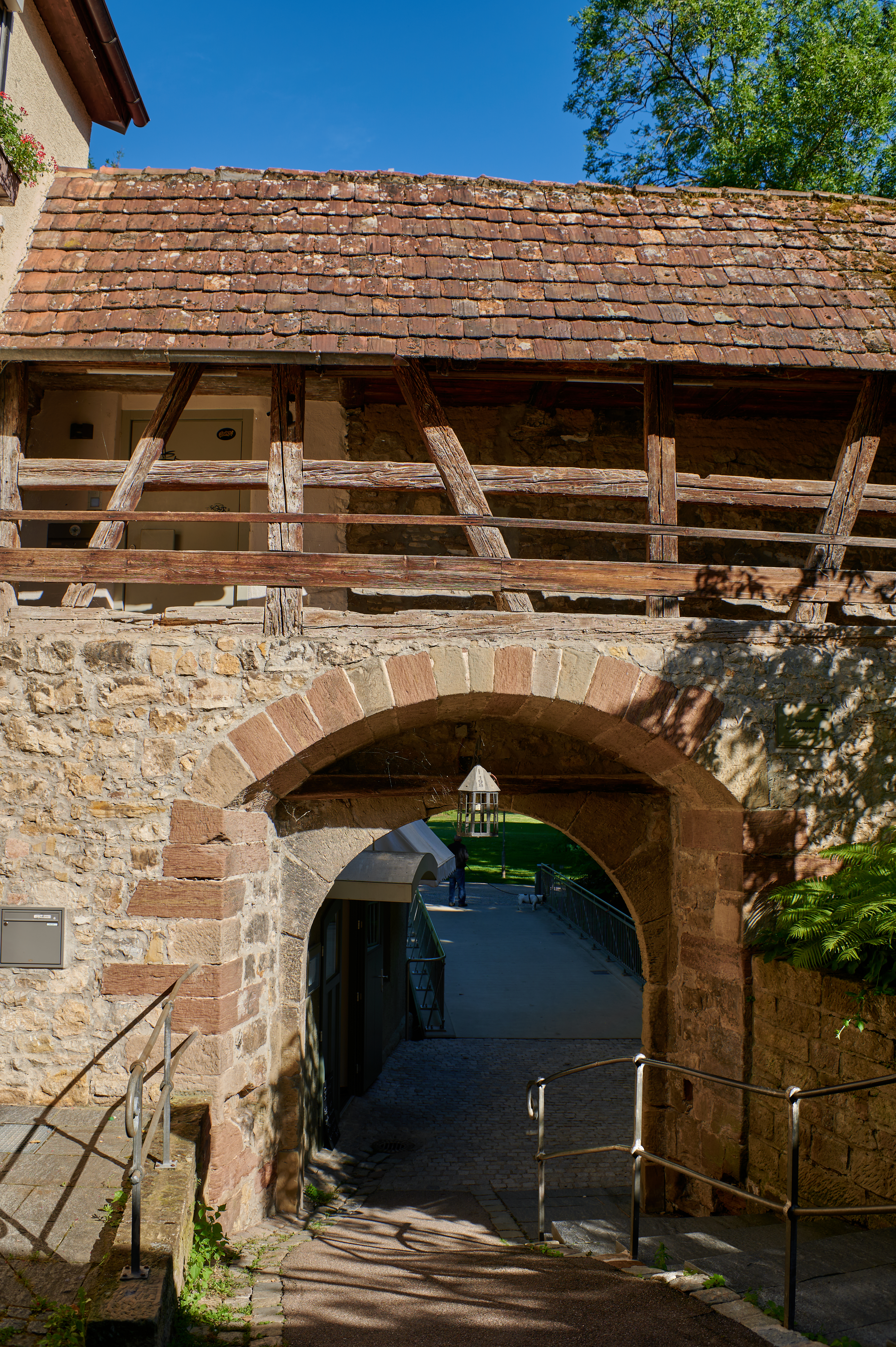
City wall gate

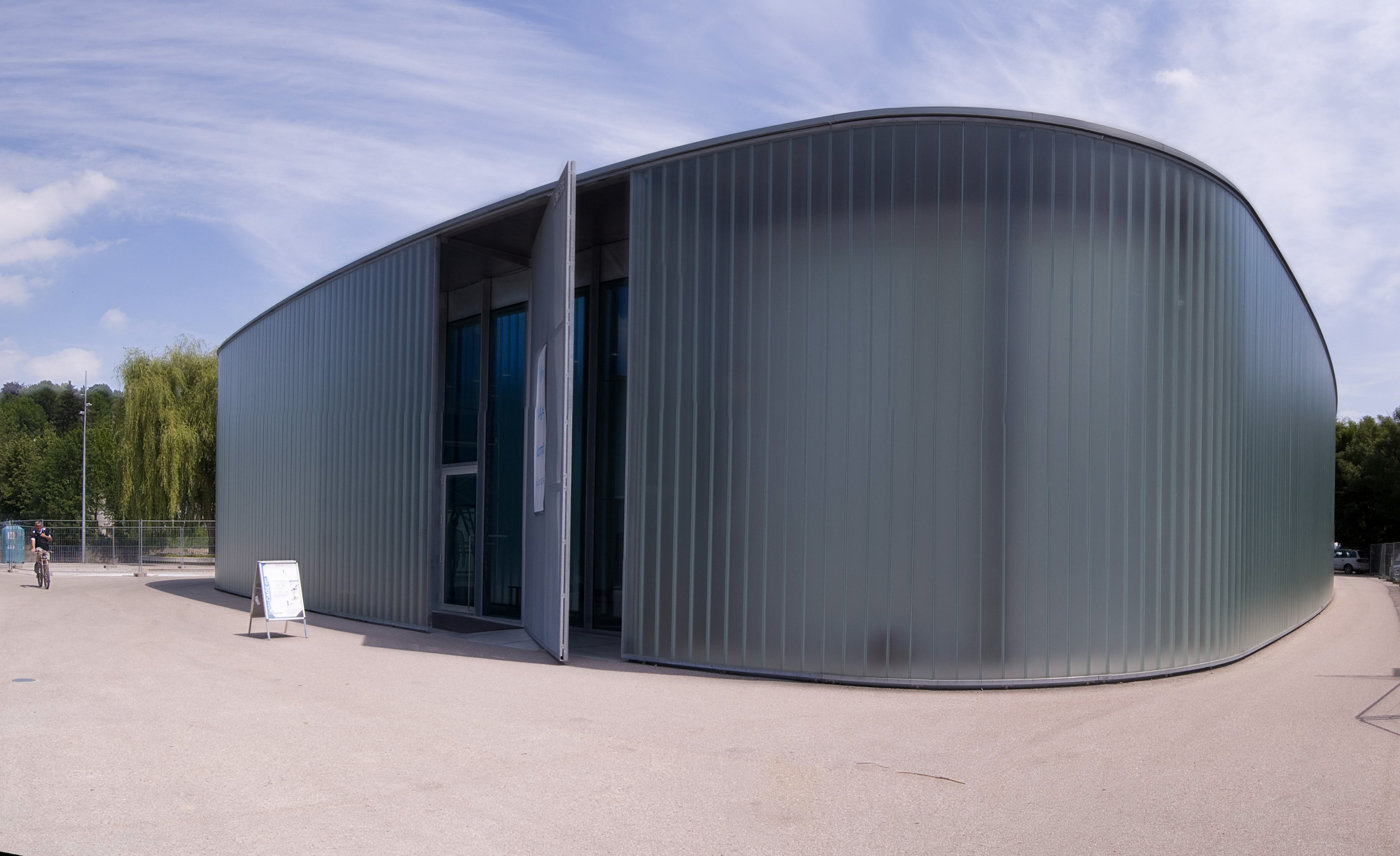
Stihl Gallary

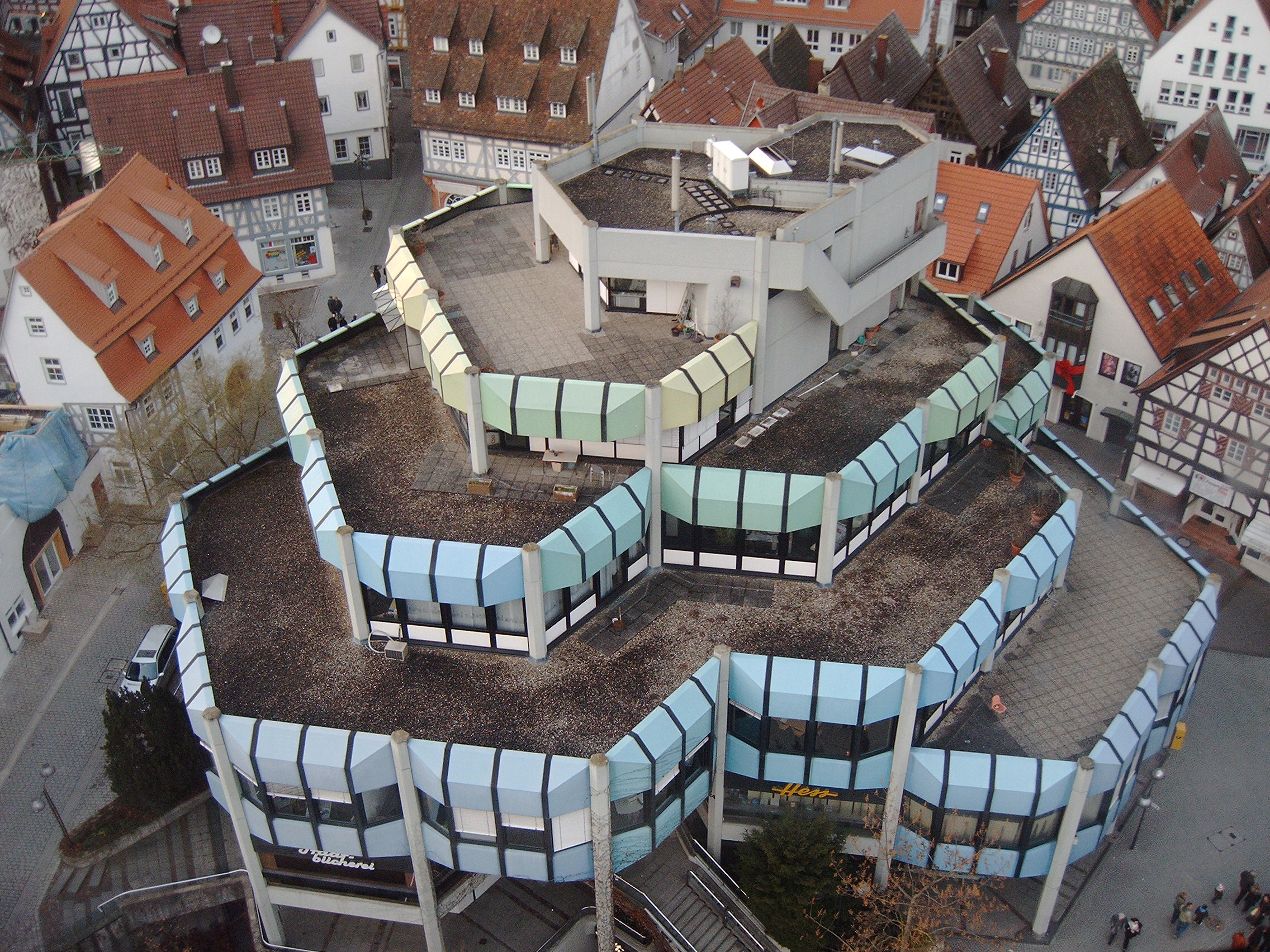
Marktdreieck, 1976 commercial building

== Politics ==
=== Federal and state level ===
In German's national parliament, the Bundestag, the district of Waiblingen is represented by two Members of the Bundestag: Christina Stumpp (CDU) and Lars Haise (AfD), both elected in 2025.

In the Baden-Württemberg state parliament, the Rems-Muss-Kreis district is represented by two members: Siegfried Lorek (CDU) and Swantje Sperling (Greens), both elected in 2026.

=== Local level ===
Waiblingen is administered by an elected mayor and municipal council of 32 members. The council is not a law-making body, but decides on the administrative organization of the municipality insofar as matters of the local community are concerned, and if no other institutions have jurisdiction; examples include the maintenance of roads, or Kindergarten fees.

==== Municipal Council ====
The results of the most recent 2024 municipal election were as follows:

Party	Votes	%	+/–	Seats
Christian Democratic Union	173,530	29.91	+1	9
Social Democratic Party	84,994	14.65	-1	5
Alliance 90/The Greens	66,829	11.52	+4	4
Free Democratic Party	49,443	8.52	–	3
Animal Protection Party	17,075	2.94	–	1
Free Voters	103,587	17.85	/	5
Alternative Liste Waiblingen	33,803	5.83	-2	2
Greens, Friends of Nature and Animals Waiblingen	32,401	5.58	–	2
Citizen's List Bittenfeld	18,525	3.19	–	1
Alternative for Germany	0	0.00	-2	0
Total	580,187	100.00	–	32
Valid votes	24,473	99.37		
Invalid/blank votes	154	0.63		
Total votes	24,627	100.00		
Registered voters/turnout	41,332	59.58		
Source: Stadt Waiblingen

Note that votes can be cast for multiple candidates; vote totals are cumulative for all of a party's candidates.

==== Mayor ====
Waiblingen's administration is led by a mayor directly elected for a renewable eight-year term. The town's highest official was called Schultheiß until 1930, then Bürgermeister (mayor) until 1962, and since Waiblingen's elevation to a major district town, Oberbürgermeister. Waiblingen's current mayor is Sebastian Wolf (CDU), elected in 2022 with over 95% of votes. Since the beginning of the 20th century, Waiblingen's mayors were:

- 1892–1918: Martin Röcker
- 1919–1928: Ernst Vogel
- 1929–1933: Hugo Wendel
- 1933–1945: Alfred Diebold
- 1945–1946: Friedrich Späth
- 1946–1954: Adolf Bauer
- 1954–1962: Alfred Diebold
- 1962–1963: Helmut Weber (FDP)
- 1963–1970: Kurt Gebhardt (FDP)
- 1970–1994: Ulrich Gauß (FDP)
- 1994–2006: Werner Schmidt-Hieber (FDP)
- 2006–2022: Andreas Hesky (Free Voters)
- since 2022: Sebastian Wolf (CDU)

== Economy ==
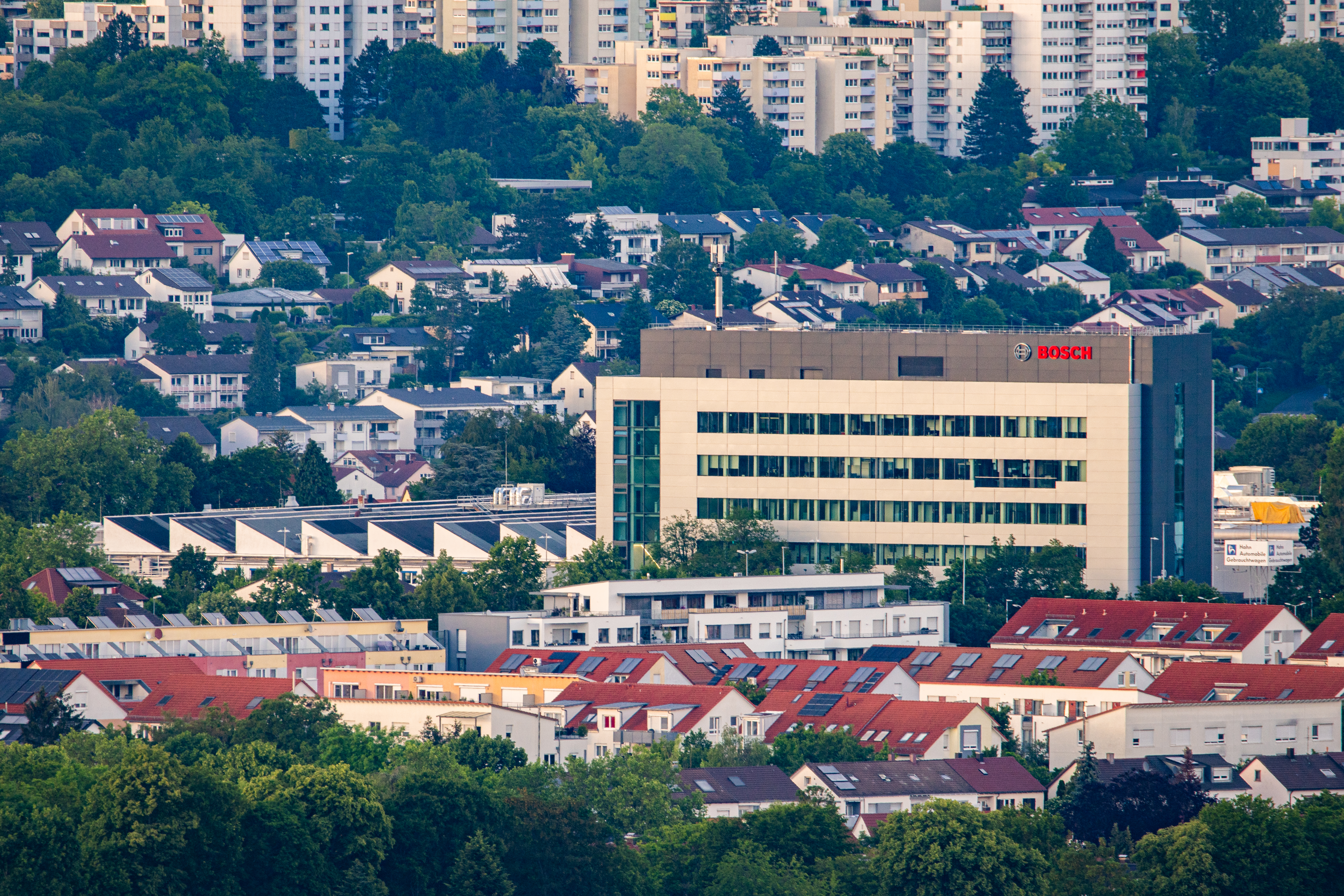
Bosch factory

Waiblingen-Neustadt houses the principal office of the world's biggest chainsaw manufacturer, Stihl; the company is the largest local employer with more than 3,700 workers. Multinational engineering and technology company Bosch has two factories in the city producing polymer and packaging technology, together with research and development facilities in healthcare. In 2025, the company announced it will reduce local capacity with a potential loss of 340 of 1,100 employees. Other major employers include manufacturing systems engineering company REMS, and Deutsche Post's letter processing center for the Stuttgart region sorting more than 850 million letters per year.

== Transport ==
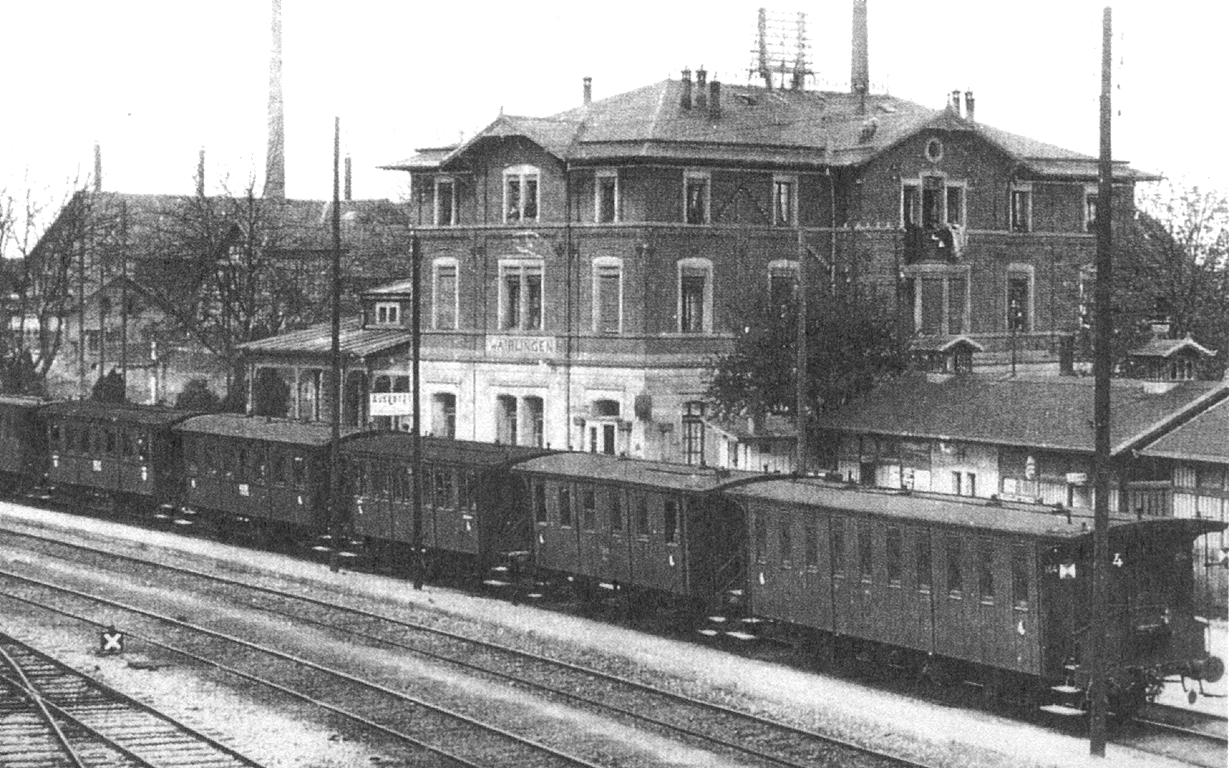
Waiblingen railway station around 1900

Waiblingen lies on federal road Bundesstraße 14, which runs from neighbouring Fellbach past the southern and eastern parts of the town before continuing towards Winnenden. Federal road Bundesstraße 29 begins in Waiblingen and continues east towards nearby Schorndorf, before terminating 100 kilometers further east in Nördlingen, passing by the city of Aalen.

Waiblingen also lies on the Stuttgart-Bad Cannstatt–Nördlingen railway and the Waiblingen–Schwäbisch Hall railway, which are served by both long-distance Regional-Express trains, and the suburban railway of the Stuttgart S-Bahn.

A number of long-distance cycle paths run through Waiblingen, including the 106-kilometer Remstal-Radweg following the river Rems from Aalen to Remseck, and the 396-kilometer Württemberger Weinradweg themed around the region's wine production.

== Education ==
Waiblingen has two primary schools in the city proper (Rinnenäckerschule and Wolfgang-Zacher-Schule), in addition to one primary school each in the townships of Beinstein (Grundschule), Bittenfeld (Schillerschule), Hegnach (Burgschule), Hohenacker (Lindenschule), and Neustadt (Friedensschule). Its two main secondary school centers – Salier-Schule and Staufer-Schule – offer three levels of German secondary education: Gesamtschule, Realschule, and Gymnasium. Three vocational schools (Gewerbliche Schule, Kaufmännische Schule, and Maria-Merian-Schule) are run by the Rems-Murr-Kreis district. Waiblingen's nearest institutions of tertiary education are the University of Stuttgart, University of Hohenheim, Ludwigsburg University of Education, and Esslingen University of Applied Sciences.

== Climate ==
Climate data for Waiblingen (1991-2020)
Month	Jan	Feb	Mar	Apr	May	Jun	Jul	Aug	Sep	Oct	Nov	Dec	Year
Daily mean °C (°F)	2.0 (35.6)	2.9 (37.2)	6.5 (43.7)	10.7 (51.3)	14.8 (58.6)	18.2 (64.8)	20.1 (68.2)	19.7 (67.5)	15.2 (59.4)	10.6 (51.1)	5.8 (42.4)	2.7 (36.9)	10.8 (51.4)
Average precipitation mm (inches)	50.7 (2.00)	45.7 (1.80)	52.3 (2.06)	45.8 (1.80)	86.5 (3.41)	85.1 (3.35)	90.4 (3.56)	83.5 (3.29)	56.5 (2.22)	65.6 (2.58)	59.5 (2.34)	63.4 (2.50)	785 (30.91)
Mean monthly sunshine hours	63.2	86.8	139	184	209.1	227.1	242	226.7	167.9	112	66.5	54	1,778.3
Source: Deutscher Wetterdienst

== Twin towns / sister cities ==
Waiblingen is twinned with:

- Mayenne, France, since 1962
- Devizes, United Kingdom, since 1966
- Baja, Hungary, since 1988
- Jesi, Italy, since 1996
- Virginia Beach, United States, since 2018
- Schmalkalden, Germany, since 1990 ("city friendship")

== Notable people ==
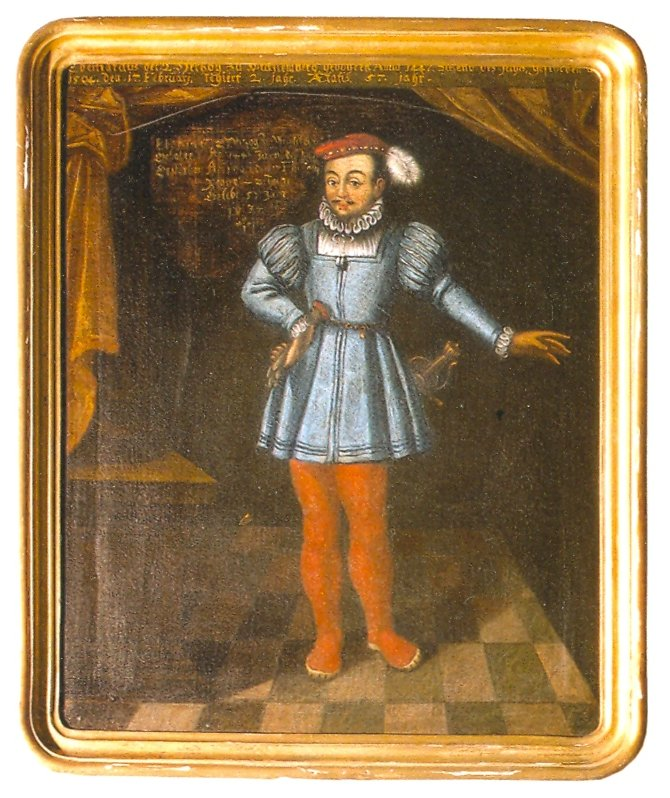
Eberhard II, Duke of Württemberg, c. 1640

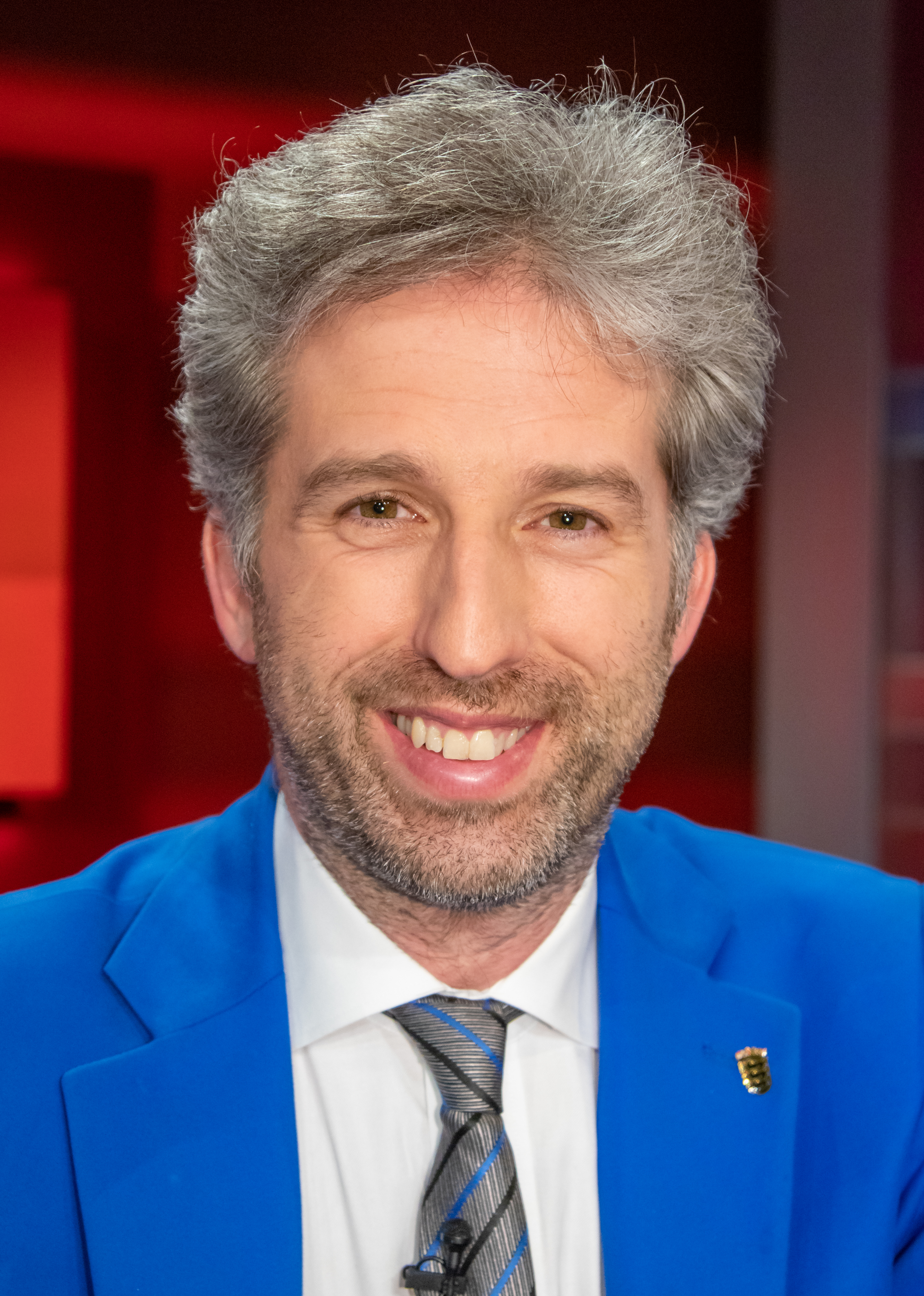
Boris Palmer, 2020

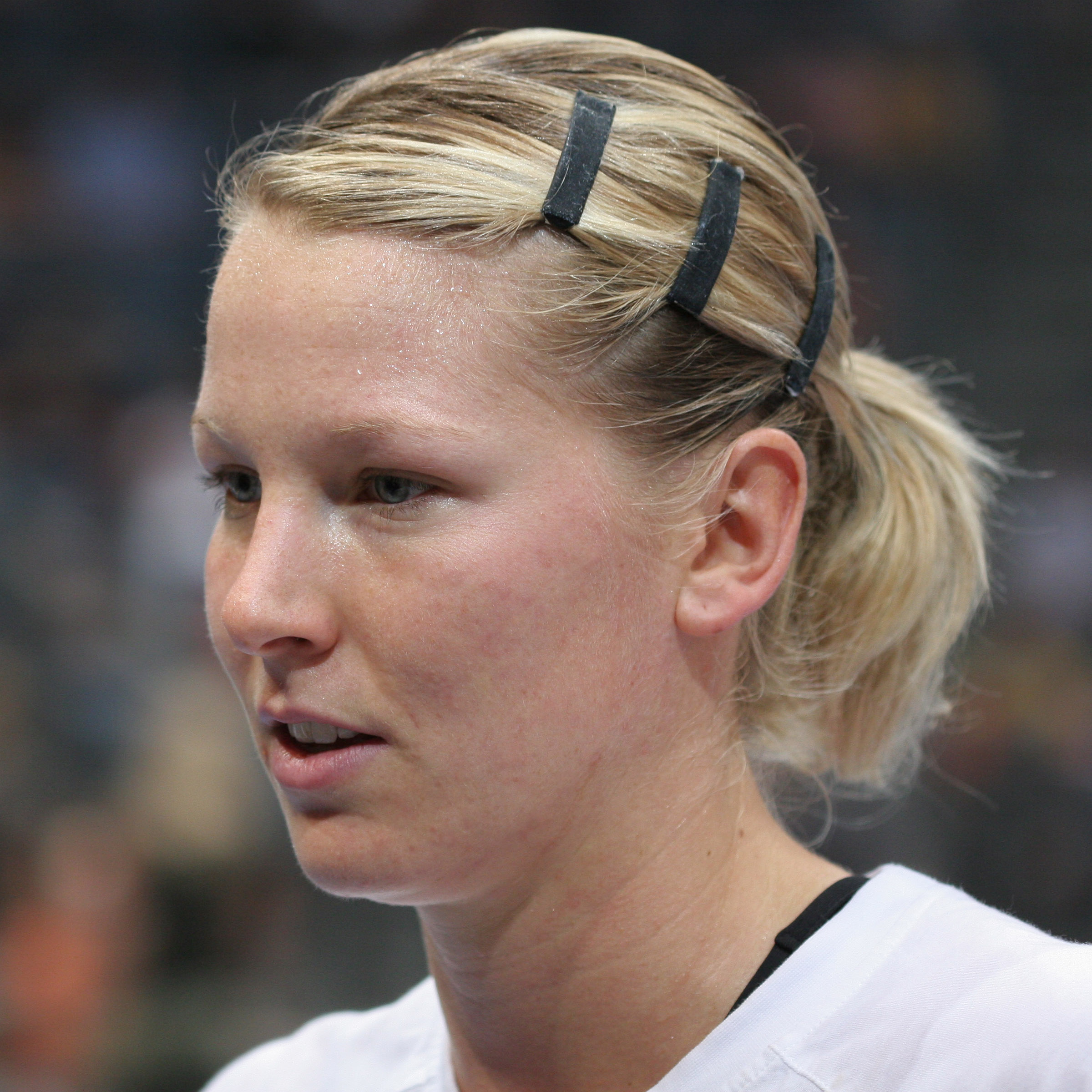
Nadine Krause, 2008

- Ludwig II, Count of Württemberg-Urach (1439–1457)
- Eberhard II, Duke of Württemberg (1447–1504)
- Jakob Andreae (1528–1590), Lutheran theologian and Protestant reformer
- Adam Gottlieb Weigen (1677–1727), pietist, theologian and early animal rights advocate
- Luise Duttenhofer (1776–1829), papercutting artist
- Karl Daiber (1878-1956) architect and politician in Ulm
- Carl Paul Pfleiderer (1881–1960), mechanical engineer and university lecturer, developed the centrifugal pump
- Christian Mergenthaler (1884–1980), Nazi politician, Minister-president of Württemberg, 1933–1945
- Gottlob Kopp (1895-1970), painter, president of the Stuttgart Chamber of Crafts
- Lenore Volz (1913–2009), Protestant theologian, one of the first local women to be a church minister
- Manfred Wundram (1925–2015), art historian
- Ulrich Gauß (born 1932), politician and mayor of Waiblingen, 1970-1994.
- Alfred Biolek (1934–2021), entertainer and TV producer
- Norbert F. Pötzl (born 1948), journalist, author and editor of Der Spiegel
- Mathias Richling (born 1953), actor, author, comedian and Kabarett artist
- Claus E. Heinrich (born 1955), manager and entrepreneur
- Christoph Niemann (born 1970), illustrator and children's book author
- Boris Palmer (born 1972), politician and former member of the Green Party; mayor of Tübingen since 2007

=== Sport ===
- Manfred Winkelhock (1951–1985), racing driver
- Joachim Winkelhock (born 1960), racing driver
- Günther Schäfer (born 1962), football coach and player
- Thomas Winkelhock (born 1968), racing driver
- Anouschka Bernhard (1970–2026), footballer who played 47 games for the German national team
- Bernd Mayländer (born 1971) F1 safety car driver
- Achim Pfuderer (born 1975), footballer
- Michael Fink (born 1982), football manager and player
- Nadine Krause (born 1982), handball player who played 188 games for the German national team
- Matthias Morys (born 1987), footballer
- Alessandro Abruscia (born 1990), footballer
- Simon Skarlatidis (born 1991), footballer
- Nico Schlotterbeck (born 1999), footballer who plays for the German national football team
