= Carl Paul Pfleiderer =

German mechanical engineer

Carl Paul Pfleiderer, also listed as Karl Pfleiderer (3 July 1881 in Waiblingen – 7 August 1960 in Braunschweig), was a German mechanical engineer and university lecturer at the Technical University of Braunschweig . He developed the theoretical foundations of modern centrifugal pump construction.

== Life and work ==
The son of the clothier Carl Pfleiderer (1845–1927) and his wife Marie (née Wirth; 1847–1895), Pfleiderer graduated in 1899 from the secondary school. He studied from 1901 to 1905 mechanical engineering at the Technical University of Stuttgart and completed his studies with the state examination and the degree of Diplôme d'ingénieur. In 1906 following the promotion of Doktoringenieur, with a thesis on dynamic processes during start-up of equipment. This was followed in 1907 by several years in the industry as a design engineer for pumps and steam engines. From 1909 he worked for the Thyssen company in Mülheim an der Ruhr as a senior engineer and head of the department.

== Lecturing in Braunschweig ==
On 1 January 1912, Pfleiderer was appointed a professor of steam engineering at the Technical University of Braunschweig. During the World War I, he served his military service from 1914, until 1917 as the chief man and leader of an artillery battery. Returning to the university, he has been running the high-school power plant since 1920, which has also been used for research and training purposes. From 1945 to 1947, Pfleiderer was the rector of the university. Pfleiderer was emeritus in 1949 and lived in Duchess-Elisabeth-Strasse in Braunschweig in 1951. In September 1952, Hartwig Petermann (1919-1997) became his successor as an institute leader.

== Honours ==
Pfleiderer was appointed an honorary doctorate on the occasion of his 70th birthday, from the University of Stuttgart in 1951. In 1951 he was made an honorary senator of the Braunschweig University of Technology and an honorary member of the Verein Deutscher Ingenieure. In 1956 he was awarded the Federal Cross of Merit medal and in the same year, the Pfleiderer Institute for Fluid Machinery (abbr. VDI) was named after him. In Brunswick, the location Pfleidererstraße in the district de:Kanzlerfeld was named after him. On the occasion of his 100th birthday, at the VDI conference in Hydraulic Machinery, the Carl Pfleiderer Memorial meeting was held at the TU Braunschweig between 14 and 16 October 1981. On his 125th birthday Prof. Dr. Ing. Carl Pfleiderer, a meeting took place from 3 July to 15 September 2006 with an exhibition in the Braunschweig University Library to celebrate his life and achievements.

== Scientific achievement ==
Pfleiderer's most important research area was centrifugal pump construction. Pumps for pumping liquids have been used for a long time, but they lacked a well-founded calculation basis for their design. These procedures were developed and patented by Pfleiderer, whereby Pfleiderer 's low-performance approach has attracted worldwide attention and is still being applied today. His work, published in 1932, on Die Kreiselpumpen soon became the standard work for the calculation and construction of centrifugal pumps.

== Publications ==
- The centrifugal pumps. German:Die Kreiselpumpen. J. Springer, Berlin 1924, DNB 57565709X
- Prediction of the characteristics of fast-running centrifugal pumps. German:Vorausbestimmung der Kennlinien schnelläufiger Kreiselpumpen. VDI-Verlag, Berlin 1938, DNB 575657111
- Hütte. Bd. 3, 1931, Abschnitt Pumpen u. Verdichter.
- The water turbine. German:e Wasserturbinen. Wolfenbütteler Verlagsanstalt, Wolfenbüttel, Hannover 1947, DNB 453763286.
- Steam turbines German:Dampfturbinen. Wolfenbütteler Verlagsanstalt, Wolfenbüttel, Hannover 1949, DNB 453763200.
- Mechanical energy storage of constant volume. German:Mechanische Energiespeicher konstanten Volumens. In: Eduard Justi (Hrsg.): Abhandlungen der Braunschweigischen Wissenschaftlichen Gesellschaft. Band III. 1951. Verlag Friedr. Vieweg & Sohn, Braunschweig, 1951, S.200 - S.215.
- Turbomachinery. German:Strömungsmaschinen, Berlin 1952. Dieses Standardwerk ist ein Klassiker der Technik und erschien 2005 in 7. Auflage, gemeinsam mit Hartwig etermann (ISBN 3-540-22173-5) und wurde in mehrere Sprachen übersetzt.
- Centrifugal pumps for liquids and gases: water pumps, fans, turbo blowers, turbocompressors. German:Die Kreiselpumpen für Flüssigkeiten und Gase : Wasserpumpen, Ventilatoren, Turbogebläse, Turbokompressoren. Springer, Berlin 1955, DNB 453763227
