= List of monarchs of Württemberg =

Monarchy of Württemberg
- State
- Royal coat of arms

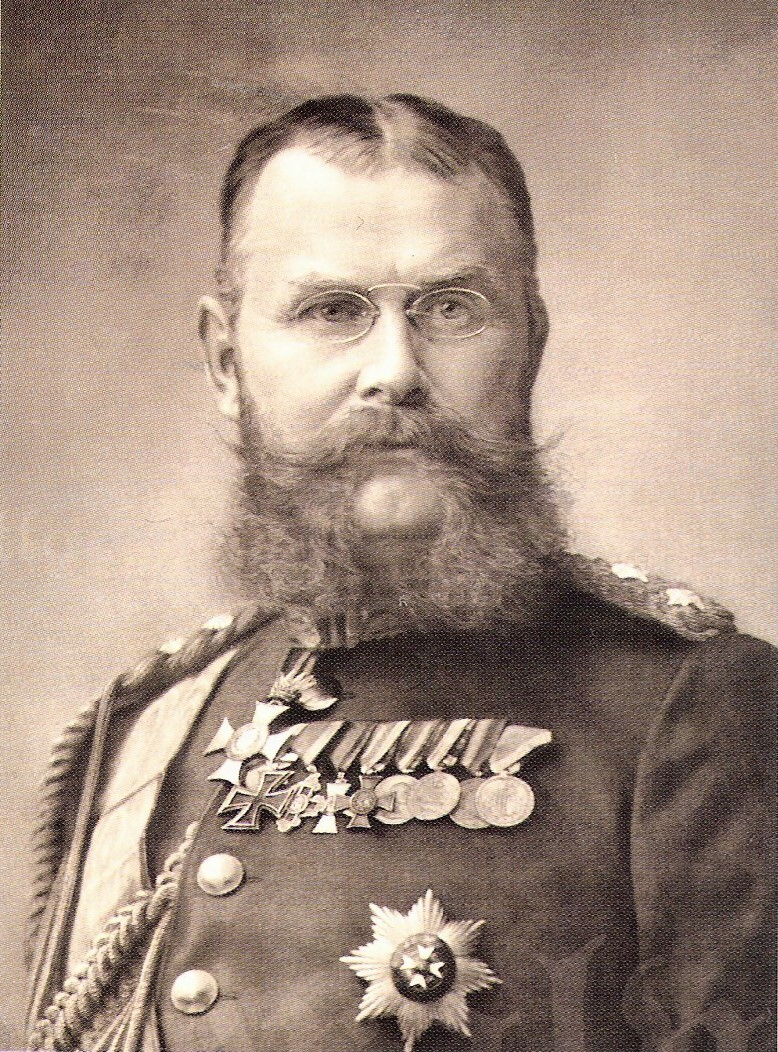
- Last to reign: William II; 6 October 1891 – 30 November 1918

Details
- Style: His Majesty
- First monarch: Conrad I (as Count)
- Last monarch: William II (as King)
- Formed: 1081
- Abolished: 30 November 1918
- Appointer: Hereditary
- Pretender: Wilhelm, Duke of Württemberg

Coat of arms of the Kingdom of Württemberg, 1806-1817

The following is a list of monarchs during the history of Württemberg. From the beginning of the County of Württemberg in the 11th century to the end of the Kingdom of Württemberg in 1918, Württemberg was ruled by counts, dukes, electors, and kings.

== Rulers of Württemberg ==
=== House of Württemberg ===
==== Partitions of Württemberg under Württemberg rule ====
County of Württemberg (1089–1442)
County of Stuttgart (1442–1482)
County of Montbéliard (Stuttgart line, 1st creation) (1473–1482)	County of Urach (1442–1482)
County of Montbéliard (1526–1593)	County of Württemberg (1482–1495); Raised to: Duchy of Württemberg (1495–1803) (Urach line until 1495; Stuttgart line until 1498) (Montbéliard line until 1733)
Duchy of Weitlingen (1588–1705)
County of Montbéliard (1617–1723)	Duchy of Neuenstadt (1st creation) (1617–1631)	(Winnental line from 1733)	Duchy of Oels (1635–1792) (Wilhelminort line from 1761)
Duchy of Neuenstadt (2nd creation) (1649–1742)
Duchy of Winnental (1677–1733)
Duchy of Wilhelminort (1704–1761)
Annexed to the Duchy of Brunswick-Lüneburg
Raised to: Electorate of Württemberg (1803–1806) Raised to: Kingdom of Württemberg (1806–1918)

==== Table of monarchs ====
Monarch	Born	Reign	Ruling part	Consort	Death	Notes
Conrad I	c.1060? Son of ? of Beutelsbach	1099 – 1122	County of Württemberg	Werntrud no children	1122 aged 61–62?	Considered to be founder of the Württemberg dynasty.
Conrad II	c.1080 Son of Liutgard of Beutelsbach	1122 – 1143	County of Württemberg	Hadelwig c.1095? at least two children	1143 aged 62-63	His mother was a sister of Conrad I. He served as marshal of Swabia and advocate of the town of Ulm, and had large possessions in the valleys of the Neckar and the Rems. Based on the similarity between their coats of arms, it is believed that Conrad II belonged to the family of the Counts of Veringen (Veringenstadt).
Louis I	c.1098 Son of Conrad II and Hadelwig	1143 – 1158	County of Württemberg	Unknown at least one child	1158 aged 59–60	He presumably was Vogt of the Denkendorf monastery.
Louis II	c.1137 Son of Louis I	1158 – 1181	County of Württemberg	Willibirg of Kirchberg (1142-1179); 11633; Stuttgart two children	1181 aged 43–44	
Hartmann	c.1160 First son of Louis II and Willibirg of Kirchberg	1181 – 1240	County of Württemberg	? of Veringen no children	1240 aged 79–80	Sons of Louis II, ruled jointly since 1194. Hartmann inherited Veringen estates through his marriage. Hartmann's children founded a branch of counts of Grüningen-Landau.
Louis III	1166; Second son of Louis II and Willibirg of Kirchberg	1181 – 1241	County of Württemberg	? of Dillenburg/Kyburg; 1184 four children	1241 aged 74–75	Sons of Louis II, ruled jointly since 1194. Hartmann inherited Veringen estates through his marriage. Hartmann's children founded a branch of counts of Grüningen-Landau.
Ulrich I the Founder	1226; Son of Hermann of Württemberg and Irmgard of Ulten	1241 – 25 February 1265	County of Württemberg	Matilda of Baden; 1251 three children Agnes of Legnica; 1259 one child	25 February 1265	Grandson of Hartmann I.
Ulrich II	1254; Son of Ulrich I and Matilda of Baden	25 February 1265 – 18 September 1279	County of Württemberg	Unknown	18 September 1279 aged 24–25	
Eberhard I the Illustrious	13 March 1265; Son of Ulrich I and Agnes of Legnica	18 September 1279 – 5 June 1325	County of Württemberg	Unknown two children Margaret of Lorraine c.1280? one child Irmengard of Baden; 21 June 1296 three children	5 June 1325 aged 60	
Ulrich III	c.1290 Son of Eberhard I and Margaret of Lorraine	5 June 1325 – 11 July 1344	County of Württemberg	Sophia of Pfirt; 1312 two children	11 July 1344; Alsace aged 53–54	
Eberhard II the Jarrer	c.1315 First son of Ulrich III and Sophia of Pfirt	11 July 1344 – 15 March 1392	County of Württemberg	Elisabeth of Henneberg-Schleusingen; 17 September 1342 two children	15 March 1392; Stuttgart aged 76–77?	Sons of Ulrich III, ruled jointly. Ulrich IV usually stood in the shadow of his elder brother Eberhard II. Because of that, he temporarily strove towards the division of the realm, which motivated Eberhard to force his brother to sign a treaty that stipulated the indivisibility of the county on December 3, 1361. On May 1, 1362, Ulrich IV relinquished his participation in the government.
Ulrich IV	c.1315 Second son of Ulrich III and Sophia of Pfirt	11 July 1344 – 1 May 1362	County of Württemberg	Katharina of Helfenstein c.1345 no children	1366; Neuffen aged 50–51?	Sons of Ulrich III, ruled jointly. Ulrich IV usually stood in the shadow of his elder brother Eberhard II. Because of that, he temporarily strove towards the division of the realm, which motivated Eberhard to force his brother to sign a treaty that stipulated the indivisibility of the county on December 3, 1361. On May 1, 1362, Ulrich IV relinquished his participation in the government.
Eberhard III the Clement	1364; Stuttgart; Son of Ulrich of Württemberg and Elisabeth of Bavaria	15 March 1392 – 16 May 1417	County of Württemberg	Antonia Visconti; 27 October 1380; Urach three children Elisabeth of Nuremberg; 22 November 1412 one child	16 May 1417; Göppingen aged 52–53	Grandson of Eberhard II. His reign was noted by a peace-preserving policy of alliances with neighboring principalities and imperial towns. Examples are an alliances with 14 Upper-Swabian towns, concluded 27 August 1395 and the Marbachs alliance in 1405. Acquired the County of Montbéliard marrying his son to its heiress.
Eberhard IV the Younger	23 August 1388; Son of Eberhard III and Antonia Visconti	16 May 1417 – 2 July 1419	County of Württemberg	Henriette, Countess of Montbéliard; 1407 three children	2 July 1419; Waiblingen aged 30	Took part in government since 1407, and ruled in Montbéliard with his wife since 1409.
Regency of Henriette, Countess of Montbéliard (1419-1433)						Sons of Eberhard IV, co-ruled with their mother as regent until 1433. However, they agreed in dividing the county in 1442. Louis also inherited Montbéliard from his mother in 1444, and remodeled Urach into his residence and implemented an active policy to strengthen the monasteries in his realm of power. On his part, Ulrich inherited Stuttgart.
Louis I (IV)	c.1412 First son of Eberhard IV and Henriette, Countess of Montbéliard	2 July 1419 – 24 September 1450	County of Urach (co-ruling in Württemberg until 1442; with County of Montbéliard since 1444)	Mechthild of the Palatinate; 21 October 1436; Stuttgart five children	24 September 1450; Bad Urach aged 37–38	Sons of Eberhard IV, co-ruled with their mother as regent until 1433. However, they agreed in dividing the county in 1442. Louis also inherited Montbéliard from his mother in 1444, and remodeled Urach into his residence and implemented an active policy to strengthen the monasteries in his realm of power. On his part, Ulrich inherited Stuttgart.
Ulrich V the Well-Loved	1413; Second son of Eberhard IV and Henriette, Countess of Montbéliard	2 July 1419 – 1 September 1480	County of Stuttgart (co-ruling in Württemberg until 1442)	Margaret of Cleves; 29 January 1441; Stuttgart one child Elisabeth of Bavaria-Landshut, Countess of Württemberg; 8 February 1445; Stuttgart five children Margaret of Savoy; 11 November 1453; Stuttgart three children	1 September 1480; Leonberg aged 66–67	Sons of Eberhard IV, co-ruled with their mother as regent until 1433. However, they agreed in dividing the county in 1442. Louis also inherited Montbéliard from his mother in 1444, and remodeled Urach into his residence and implemented an active policy to strengthen the monasteries in his realm of power. On his part, Ulrich inherited Stuttgart.
The Treaty of Nürtingen divided the County of Württemberg into two separate lines. Württemberg-Stuttgart, containing the northern and eastern parts of the old county, with the capital Stuttgart; and Württemberg-Urach, containing the southern and western parts, with the capital Urach.
Regency of Ulrich V, Count of Urach (1450-1453)						
Louis II (V)	3 April 1439; Waiblingen; First son of Louis I (IV) and Mechthild of the Palatinate	24 September 1450 – 3 November 1457	County of Urach (with County of Montbéliard)	Unmarried	3 November 1457; Bad Urach aged 18	
Mechthild of the Palatinate	c.1412 Daughter of Louis III, Elector Palatine and Matilda of Savoy	24 September 1450 – 22 August 1482	County of Urach (at Rottenburg am Neckar)	Louis I (IV); 21 October 1436; Stuttgart five children Albert VI, Archduke of Austria; 1452; Vienna no children	24 September 1450; Bad Urach aged 37–38	Widow of Louis I/IV, retained her widow's seat.
The Treaty of Münsingen reunited the two separate Lines under Eberhard V in 1482. Eberhard obtained the title of Duke in 1495.
Regency of Mechthild of the Palatinate (1457-1459)						Reunited the counties of Württemberg under his rule in 14 December 1482. His title was elevated to Duke in 1495. Founded the University of Tübingen, but expelled the Jews from his lands. He left no descendants, and the duchy passed to the deposed count of Stuttgart.
Eberhard V & I the Bearded	11 December 1445; Second son of Louis I (IV) and Mechthild of the Palatinate	3 November 1457 – 24 February 1496	County of Württemberg (at Urach until 1482; County until 1495; with County of Montbéliard until 1473; ) Duchy of Württemberg (from 1495)	Barbara Gonzaga; 12 April/4 July 1474; Urach one child	24 February 1496; Tübingen aged 50	Reunited the counties of Württemberg under his rule in 14 December 1482. His title was elevated to Duke in 1495. Founded the University of Tübingen, but expelled the Jews from his lands. He left no descendants, and the duchy passed to the deposed count of Stuttgart.
Eberhard VI & II	1 February 1447; Waiblingen; First son of Ulrich V and Elisabeth of Bavaria-Landshut, Countess of Württemberg	1 September 1480 – 14 December 1482	County of Stuttgart	Elisabeth of Brandenburg; April/May 1467; Stuttgart no children	17 February 1504; Lindenfels aged 57	Children of Ulrich V. Henry received Montbéliard (and other Württemberg possessions on the left bank of the Rhine) from his cousin Eberhard V in 1473, following the Treaty of Urach. In the course of a dispute between Charles the Bold and Frederick III, Holy Roman Emperor, Henry became Charles' prisoner in 1474-1477. By the 1482 Treaty of Reichenweier, Henry gave the county of Montbéliard to his brother. Eberhard VI, as the eldest son, succeeded his father in 1480, also with his brother Henry (recently freed) as claimant. Eberhard VI was deposed by his namesake cousin, who reunited the county and raised it to duchy, but as Eberhard V didn't have children, Eberhard VI became again heir and then Duke of Wurttemberg. But he soon ran into trouble with the nobility, who disempowered him. He fled to Ulm, but as he didn't find support, he was forced to accept the Arbitration of Horb in 1498, which deposed and banished him, in exchange for an annual pension of 6,000 guilders.
Eberhard VI & II	1 February 1447; Waiblingen; First son of Ulrich V and Elisabeth of Bavaria-Landshut, Countess of Württemberg	24 February 1496 – 10 June 1498	Duchy of Württemberg	Elisabeth of Brandenburg; April/May 1467; Stuttgart no children	17 February 1504; Lindenfels aged 57	
Henry	7 September 1448; Stuttgart; Second son of Ulrich V and Elisabeth of Bavaria-Landshut, Countess of Württemberg	1473 – 1482	County of Montbéliard	Elisabeth of Palatinate-Zweibrücken-Bitsch (d. 17 February 1487); 10 January 1485; Reichenweier one child Eva of Salm-Badenweiler (1468-1521); 21 July 1488; Reichenweier two children	15 April 1519; Hohenurach aged 70	
Montbéliard was briefly annexed to Württemberg
Regency of the Estates of the realm (1498-1503)						Infamous for his violent tendencies, which caused marital problems, and which, at a greater extent, had him deposed in January 1519 and the duchy annexed to Austria. In exile, and away from his wife, who fled to Bavaria, he befriended Philip, landgrave of Hesse. Restored in May 1534, he aimed to bring the Reformation to the Duchy and, as Henry VIII of England was doing in his country, he also supported the Dissolution of the Monasteries.
Ulrich	8 February 1487; Riquewihr; Son of Henry and Elisabeth of Palatinate-Zweibrücken-Bitsch	10 June 1498 – 1519 1534 – 6 November 1550	Duchy of Württemberg (with County of Montbéliard 1498-1526 and 1534-1542)	Sabina of Bavaria; 2 March 1511 two children	6 November 1550; Tübingen aged 63	Infamous for his violent tendencies, which caused marital problems, and which, at a greater extent, had him deposed in January 1519 and the duchy annexed to Austria. In exile, and away from his wife, who fled to Bavaria, he befriended Philip, landgrave of Hesse. Restored in May 1534, he aimed to bring the Reformation to the Duchy and, as Henry VIII of England was doing in his country, he also supported the Dissolution of the Monasteries.
Elisabeth of Brandenburg	29 November 1451; Ansbach; Daughter of Albrecht III Achilles, Elector of Brandenburg and Margaret of Baden	10 June 1498 – 28 March 1524	Duchy of Württemberg (at Nürtingen)	Eberhard VI & II; April/May 1467; Stuttgart no children	28 March 1524; Nürtingen aged 57	She remained in the duchy after her husband's exile, at her "widow" seat.
Württemberg annexed to Austria: 1519-1534
George I the Cautious	4 February 1498; Bad Urach; Son of Henry and Eva of Salm-Badenweiler	2 September 1526 – 1534 1553 – 17 July 1558	County of Montbéliard	Barbara of Hesse; 1555 three children	17 July 1558; Kirkel aged 60	He was deposed by his half-brother Ulrich and was only restored to his title under his nephew Christoph.
Montbéliard was annexed to Württemberg in 1534, and revived in 1542
Christopher the Pacific	12 May 1515; Bad Urach; Son of Ulrich and Sabina of Bavaria	6 November 1550 – 28 December 1568	Duchy of Württemberg (in County of Montbéliard 1542-1550)	Anna Maria of Brandenburg-Ansbach; 24 February 1544; Ansbach twelve children	28 December 1568; Stuttgart aged 53	He re-organized the entire administration of the church and state. He also reformed and supported the educational system. He also reconstructed the Altes Schloss in Stuttgart and hosted many celebrations. His mother, who had fled from his father, returned to her widow's seat in Nürtingen.
Sabina of Bavaria	24 April 1492; Munich; Daughter of Albert IV, Duke of Bavaria and Kunigunde of Austria	6 November 1550 – 30 August 1564	Duchy of Württemberg (at Nürtingen)	Ulrich; 2 March 1511 two children	30 August 1564; Nürtingen aged 72	He re-organized the entire administration of the church and state. He also reformed and supported the educational system. He also reconstructed the Altes Schloss in Stuttgart and hosted many celebrations. His mother, who had fled from his father, returned to her widow's seat in Nürtingen.
Regency of Anna Maria of Brandenburg-Ansbach, George Frederick, Margrave of Brandenburg-Ansbach and Charles II, Margrave of Baden-Durlach (1568-77) and Wolfgang, Count Palatine of Zweibrücken (1568-69)						Left no descendants, and the duchy passed to his cousin Frederick I. His mother kept a seat at Nurtingen.
Louis the Pious	1 January 1554; Stuttgart; Son of Christopher and Anna Maria of Brandenburg-Ansbach	28 December 1568 – 28 August 1593	Duchy of Württemberg	Dorothea Ursula of Baden-Durlach; 7 November 1575 no children Ursula of Palatinate-Veldenz; 1585 no children	28 August 1593; Stuttgart aged 38	Left no descendants, and the duchy passed to his cousin Frederick I. His mother kept a seat at Nurtingen.
Anna Maria of Brandenburg-Ansbach	28 December 1526; Jägerndorf; Daughter of George, Margrave of Brandenburg-Ansbach and Hedwig of Münsterberg-Oels	28 December 1568 – 20 May 1589	Duchy of Württemberg (at Nürtingen)	Christopher; 24 February 1544; Ansbach twelve children	20 May 1589; Nürtingen aged 63	Left no descendants, and the duchy passed to his cousin Frederick I. His mother kept a seat at Nurtingen.
Regency of Christopher, Duke of Württemberg (1558-1568), Philipp III, Count of Hanau-Münzenberg (1558-1561), Philip I, Landgrave of Hesse (1558-1567) and Wolfgang, Count Palatine of Zweibrücken (1558-1569)						Left no descendants, and the duchy passed to his brother Frederick I.
Frederick I	19 August 1557; Montbéliard; Son of George I and Barbara of Hesse	17 July 1558 – 28 August 1593	County of Montbéliard	Sibylla of Anhalt; 22 May 1581; Stuttgart fifteen children	29 January 1608; Stuttgart aged 50	Left no descendants, and the duchy passed to his brother Frederick I.
Frederick I	19 August 1557; Montbéliard; Son of George I and Barbara of Hesse	28 August 1593 – 29 January 1608	Duchy of Württemberg	Sibylla of Anhalt; 22 May 1581; Stuttgart fifteen children	29 January 1608; Stuttgart aged 50	Left no descendants, and the duchy passed to his brother Frederick I.
Montbéliard merged into Württemberg in 1593
Ursula of Palatinate-Veldenz	24 February 1572; Lauterecken; Daughter of George John I, Count Palatine of Veldenz and Anna of Sweden	29 January 1608 – 5 March 1635	Duchy of Württemberg (at Nürtingen)	Louis; 1585 no children	5 March 1635; Nürtingen aged 63	Children of Frederick I, divided their inheritance, which was officialized in 1617. John Frederick restored the constitution and councils abolished by his father. The stepmother, Ursula, as widow of Louis the Pious, had her widow's seat at Nürtingen. After Frederick Achilles' death without descendants, his duchy was briefly reannexed to the main Württemberg.
John Frederick	5 May 1582; Montbéliard; First son of Frederick I and Sibylla of Anhalt	29 January 1608 – 18 July 1628	Duchy of Württemberg	Barbara Sophie of Brandenburg; 5 November 1609; Urach nine children	18 July 1628 en route to Heidenheim aged 46	Children of Frederick I, divided their inheritance, which was officialized in 1617. John Frederick restored the constitution and councils abolished by his father. The stepmother, Ursula, as widow of Louis the Pious, had her widow's seat at Nürtingen. After Frederick Achilles' death without descendants, his duchy was briefly reannexed to the main Württemberg.
Louis Frederick	29 January 1586; Montbéliard; Third son of Frederick I and Sibylla of Anhalt	29 January 1608 – 26 January 1631	County of Montbéliard	Elisabeth Magdalena of Hesse-Darmstadt; 14 July 1617; Stuttgart three children Anna Eleonora of Nassau-Saarbrücken; 15 May 1625 three children	26 January 1631; Montbéliard aged 44	Children of Frederick I, divided their inheritance, which was officialized in 1617. John Frederick restored the constitution and councils abolished by his father. The stepmother, Ursula, as widow of Louis the Pious, had her widow's seat at Nürtingen. After Frederick Achilles' death without descendants, his duchy was briefly reannexed to the main Württemberg.
Julius Frederick	3 June 1588; Montbéliard; Fifth son of Frederick I and Sibylla of Anhalt	29 January 1608 – 25 April 1635	Duchy of Weiltingen	Anna Sabina of Schleswig-Holstein-Sonderburg; 11 December 1618; Sønderborg nine children	25 April 1635; Strasbourg aged 46	Children of Frederick I, divided their inheritance, which was officialized in 1617. John Frederick restored the constitution and councils abolished by his father. The stepmother, Ursula, as widow of Louis the Pious, had her widow's seat at Nürtingen. After Frederick Achilles' death without descendants, his duchy was briefly reannexed to the main Württemberg.
Frederick Achilles	5 May 1591; Montbéliard; Seventh son of Frederick I and Sibylla of Anhalt	29 January 1608 – 30 December 1631	Duchy of Neuenstadt	Unmarried	30 December 1631; Neuenstadt am Kocher aged 40	Children of Frederick I, divided their inheritance, which was officialized in 1617. John Frederick restored the constitution and councils abolished by his father. The stepmother, Ursula, as widow of Louis the Pious, had her widow's seat at Nürtingen. After Frederick Achilles' death without descendants, his duchy was briefly reannexed to the main Württemberg.
Neuenstadt merged in Württemberg
Regency of Louis Frederick, Duke of Württemberg-Montbéliard (1628-1631); Regency of Barbara Sophie of Brandenburg and Julius Frederick, Duke of Württemberg-Weiltingen (1631-1633)						His reign was marked by the Thirty Years War. Following a major defeat of Württemberg troops in the battle of Nördlingen (1634), Württemberg was severely looted and plundered; Eberhard fled to Strasbourg, while many territories had already been passed on by the Emperor to other parties to push forward Catholicism in the region. The Duchy of Württemberg was reinstated after the Peace of Westphalia of 1648. Only then, Eberhard returned and could divide the duchy with his brothers, in the following year.
Eberhard III	16 December 1614; Stuttgart; Second son of John Frederick and Barbara Sophie of Brandenburg	18 July 1628 – 6 September 1634 24 October 1648 – 2 July 1674	Duchy of Württemberg	Anna Catharina of Salm-Kyrburg; 26 February 1637 fourteen children Maria Dorothea Sophie of Oettingen-Oettingen; 20 July 1656; Ansbach eleven children	2 July 1674; Stuttgart aged 59	
Frederick	19 December 1615; Stuttgart; Third son of John Frederick and Barbara Sophie of Brandenburg	7 October 1649 – 24 March 1682	Duchy of Neuenstadt	Clara Augusta of Brunswick-Wolfenbüttel; 7 June 1653 twelve children	24 March 1682; Neuenstadt am Kocher aged 66	
Ulrich	15 May 1617; Stuttgart; Fourth son of John Frederick and Barbara Sophie of Brandenburg	7 October 1649 – 5 December 1671	Duchy of Neuenbürg	Sophia Dorothea of Solms-Sonnenwalde; 10 October 1647; Stuttgart one child Isabelle d'Arenberg (1623-17 August 1678); 15 May 1651; Brussels two children	5 December 1671; Stuttgart aged 54	
Neuenbürg rejoined Württemberg
Regency of George II, Landgrave of Hesse-Darmstadt and Julius Frederick, Duke of Württemberg-Weiltingen (1631-38)						Left no descendants. The duchy passed to his brother George.
Leopold Frederick	30 May 1624; Montbéliard; Son of Louis Frederick and Elisabeth Magdalena of Hesse-Darmstadt	26 January 1631 – 15 June 1662	County of Montbéliard	Sibylle of Württemberg (4 December 1620 - 21 May 1707) no children	15 June 1662; Montbéliard aged 38	Left no descendants. The duchy passed to his brother George.
Roderick	19 October 1618; Stuttgart; First son of Julius Frederick and Anna Sabina of Schleswig-Holstein-Sonderburg	25 April 1635 – 19 November 1651	Duchy of Weiltingen	Unmarried	19 November 1651; Weiltingen aged 33	Children of Julius Frederick. Roderick died without descendants and was succeeded by a younger brother, Manfred. Silvius, a middle child, inherited by marriage another duchy for the family, in Silesian land.
Silvius I Nimrod	2 May 1622; Weiltingen; Second son of Julius Frederick and Anna Sabina of Schleswig-Holstein-Sonderburg	1 May 1647 – 24 April 1664	Duchy of Oels	Elisabeth Marie, Duchess of Oels; 1 May 1647; Oleśnica seven children	24 April 1664; Brzezinka aged 41	Children of Julius Frederick. Roderick died without descendants and was succeeded by a younger brother, Manfred. Silvius, a middle child, inherited by marriage another duchy for the family, in Silesian land.
Manfred	5 June 1626; Brenz an der Brenz; Third son of Julius Frederick and Anna Sabina of Schleswig-Holstein-Sonderburg	19 November 1651 – 15 May 1662	Duchy of Weiltingen	Juliana of Oldenburg-Delmenhorst; 31 October 1652; Wolfenbüttel three children	15 May 1662; Weiltingen aged 35	Children of Julius Frederick. Roderick died without descendants and was succeeded by a younger brother, Manfred. Silvius, a middle child, inherited by marriage another duchy for the family, in Silesian land.
George II	5 October 1626; Montbéliard; Son of Louis Frederick and Anna Eleonora of Nassau-Saarbrücken	15 June 1662 – 1676 1684 – 1 June 1699	County of Montbéliard	Anne de Coligny (1624-1680); 9 March 1648; Montbéliard eight children	1 June 1699; Montbéliard aged 72	Under his rule the French occupied his lands. In 1684, refused an opportunity to return to the duchy, and it was then administered by Duke Frederick Charles of Winnental until his own death. Only then George returned, but died a year later.
Regency of Frederick Charles, Duke of Württemberg-Winnental (1684-1697)						Under his rule the French occupied his lands. In 1684, refused an opportunity to return to the duchy, and it was then administered by Duke Frederick Charles of Winnental until his own death. Only then George returned, but died a year later.
Montbéliard occupied by France (1676-1684)
Regency of Juliana of Oldenburg-Delmenhorst (1662-1679)						Left no surviving male descendants, and the duchy was reannexed to the main duchy of Württemberg
Frederick Ferdinand	6 October 1654; Weiltingen; Son of Manfred and Juliana of Oldenburg-Delmenhorst	15 May 1662 – 8 August 1705	Duchy of Weiltingen	Elisabeth of Württemberg-Montbéliard; 9 September 1689; Oleśnica three children	8 August 1705; Weiltingen aged 50	Left no surviving male descendants, and the duchy was reannexed to the main duchy of Württemberg
Weitlingen was annexed to Württemberg
Regency of Elisabeth Marie, Duchess of Oels (1664-1672)						Divided their inheritance. Silvius died without children, and Christian Ulrich of Bernstadt took his place; Bernstadt passed to the Juliusburg ruler, who moved to Bernstadt.
Silvius II Frederick the Protector	21 February 1651; Oleśnica; Second son of Silvius I Nimrod and Elisabeth Marie, Duchess of Oels	26 April 1664 – 3 June 1697	Duchy of Oels (in Oels proper)	Eleonore Charlotte of Württemberg-Montbéliard; 7 April 1672; Oleśnica no children	3 June 1697; Oleśnica aged 46	Divided their inheritance. Silvius died without children, and Christian Ulrich of Bernstadt took his place; Bernstadt passed to the Juliusburg ruler, who moved to Bernstadt.
Christian Ulrich I	9 April 1652; Oleśnica; Third son of Silvius I Nimrod and Elisabeth Marie, Duchess of Oels	26 April 1664 – 5 April 1704	Duchy of Oels (at Bernstadt until 1697; in Oels proper since 1697)	Anna Elisabeth of Anhalt-Bernburg; 13 March 1672; Bernburg seven children Sibylla Maria of Saxe-Merseburg; 27 October 1683; Doberlug-Kirchhain seven children Sophie Wilhelmine of East Frisia; 4 February 1695; Hamburg one child Sophie of Mecklenburg-Güstrow; 6 December 1700; Güstrow no children	5 April 1704; Oleśnica aged 51	Divided their inheritance. Silvius died without children, and Christian Ulrich of Bernstadt took his place; Bernstadt passed to the Juliusburg ruler, who moved to Bernstadt.
Julius Siegmund the Unfading	18 August 1653; Oleśnica; Fourth son of Silvius I Nimrod and Elisabeth Marie, Duchess of Oels	26 April 1664 – 15 October 1684	Duchy of Oels (at Juliusburg)	Anna Sophia of Mecklenburg-Schwerin; 4 April 1677; Grabow three children	15 October 1684; Dobroszyce aged 31	Divided their inheritance. Silvius died without children, and Christian Ulrich of Bernstadt took his place; Bernstadt passed to the Juliusburg ruler, who moved to Bernstadt.
William Louis	7 January 1647; Stuttgart; Fifth son of Eberhard III and Anna Catharina of Salm-Kyrburg	2 July 1674 – 23 June 1677	Duchy of Württemberg	Magdalena Sibylla of Hesse-Darmstadt; 6 November 1673; Darmstadt four children	23 June 1677; Hirsau aged 30	Children of Eberhard III, divided their inheritance.
Frederick Charles	12 September 1652; Stuttgart; Seventh son of Eberhard III and Anna Catharina of Salm-Kyrburg	2 July 1674 – 20 September 1697	Duchy of Winnental	Eleonore Juliane of Brandenburg-Ansbach; 31 October 1682; Ansbach seven children	20 September 1697; Stuttgart aged 45	Children of Eberhard III, divided their inheritance.
Regency of Magdalena Sibylla of Hesse-Darmstadt and Frederick Charles, Duke of Württemberg-Winnental (1677-1693)						For his time, Eberhard Louis was a very tolerant ruler, commonly noted by modern scholars as "enlightened." Left no surviving descendants, and thus the main line went extinct. The duchy passed to Winnental branch.
Eberhard Louis	18 September 1676; Stuttgart; Son of William Louis and Magdalena Sibylla of Hesse-Darmstadt	23 June 1677 – 31 October 1733	Duchy of Württemberg	Johanna Elisabeth of Baden-Durlach; 6 May 1697; Basel one child	31 October 1733; Ludwigsburg aged 57	For his time, Eberhard Louis was a very tolerant ruler, commonly noted by modern scholars as "enlightened." Left no surviving descendants, and thus the main line went extinct. The duchy passed to Winnental branch.
Frederick Augustus	12 March 1654; Neuenstadt am Kocher; Son of Frederick and Clara Augusta of Brunswick-Wolfenbüttel	24 March 1682 – 6 August 1716	Duchy of Neuenstadt	Albertine Sophie Esther of Eberstein; 9 February 1679 fifteen children	6 August 1716; Kraichtal aged 62	Left no male surviving descendants. The duchy passed to his brother.
Regency of Anna Sophia of Mecklenburg-Schwerin (1684-1704)						As he left no descendants, Bernstadt rejoined Oels.
Charles, Duke of Württemberg-Bernstadt	11 March 1682; Dobroszyce; Son of Julius Siegmund and Anna Sophia of Mecklenburg-Schwerin	15 October 1684 – 8 February 1745	Duchy of Oels (at Juliusburg until 1697; at Bernstadt from 1697)	Wilhelmine Louise of Saxe-Meiningen; 20 September 1703; Meiningen no children	8 February 1745; Bierutów aged 62	As he left no descendants, Bernstadt rejoined Oels.
Juliusburg annexed to Bernstadt (1697); Bernstadt annexed to Oels (1745)
Charles Alexander	24 January 1684; Stuttgart; Son of Frederick Charles and Eleonore Juliane of Brandenburg-Ansbach	20 December 1697 – 31 October 1733	Duchy of Winnental	Marie Auguste of Thurn and Taxis; 1 May 1727; Frankfurt am Main six children	12 March 1737; Ludwigsburg aged 53	Previously served as Habsburg regent of the Kingdom of Serbia (1720–33). In 1733, inherited the main Duchy of Württemberg.
Charles Alexander	24 January 1684; Stuttgart; Son of Frederick Charles and Eleonore Juliane of Brandenburg-Ansbach	31 October 1733 – 12 March 1737	Duchy of Württemberg	Marie Auguste of Thurn and Taxis; 1 May 1727; Frankfurt am Main six children	12 March 1737; Ludwigsburg aged 53	Previously served as Habsburg regent of the Kingdom of Serbia (1720–33). In 1733, inherited the main Duchy of Württemberg.
Winnental merged into Württemberg
Leopold Eberhard	21 May 1670; Montbéliard; Son of George II and Anne de Coligny	1 June 1699 – 25 May 1723	County of Montbéliard	Anne-Sabine Hedwiger; June 1695 (morganatic) four children Elisabeth Charlotte Curie; 1718; Montbéliard (morganatic) six children	25 March 1723; Montbéliard aged 52	Had no legitimate descendants, and after his death the county was definitely annexed to Württemberg.
Montbéliard was annexed to Württemberg in 1723
Charles Frederick II	7 February 1690; Merseburg; Second son of Christian Ulrich I and Sibylla Maria of Saxe-Merseburg	5 April 1704 – 1744	Duchy of Oels	Sibylle Charlotte Juliane of Württemberg-Weiltingen; 21 April 1709; Stuttgart no children	14 December 1761; Oleśnica aged 71	Children of Christian Ulrich I, divided their inheritance. Charles Frederick, childless, abdicated to his nephew, Charles Christian Erdmann.
Christian Ulrich II	27 January 1691; Zbytowa; Third son of Christian Ulrich I and Sibylla Maria of Saxe-Merseburg	5 April 1704 – 7 February 1734	Duchy of Wilhelminort	Philippine Charlotte of Roedern-Krappitz (18 February 1691 - 17 June 1758); 13 July 1711 six children	7 February 1734; Stuttgart aged 43	Children of Christian Ulrich I, divided their inheritance. Charles Frederick, childless, abdicated to his nephew, Charles Christian Erdmann.
Charles Rudolph	29 May 1667; Neuenstadt am Kocher; Son of Frederick Augustus and Albertine Sophie Esther of Eberstein	6 August 1716 – 17 November 1742	Duchy of Neuenstadt	Unmarried	17 November 1742; Neuenstadt am Kocher aged 75	Left no male surviving descendants. The duchy was annexed into Württemberg.
Neuenstadt was annexed to Württemberg in 1742
Regency of Charles Rudolph, Duke of Württemberg-Neuenstadt (1737-1738); Regency of Charles Frederick II, Duke of Württemberg-Oels (1738-1746)						Left no children. The duchy passed to his brother.
Charles Eugene	11 February 1728; Brussels; First son of Charles Alexander and Marie Auguste of Thurn and Taxis	12 March 1737 – 24 October 1793	Duchy of Württemberg	Elisabeth Friederike Sophie of Brandenburg-Bayreuth; 26 September 1748; Bayreuth one child Countess Franziska von Hohenheim; 10/11 January 1785 (morganatic until 1790) no children	24 October 1793; Hohenheim aged 65	Left no children. The duchy passed to his brother.
Charles Christian Erdmann	26 October 1716; Brzozowiec; Son of Christian Ulrich II and Philippine Charlotte of Roedern-Krappitz	7 February 1734 – 1744	Duchy of Wilhelminort	Marie Sophie Wilhelmine of Solms-Laubach (1721-1793); 8 April 1741; Laubach three children	14 December 1792; Oleśnica aged 76	Left no male descendants. His duchy was inherited by his already widowed son-in-law, from the House of Welf.
Charles Christian Erdmann	26 October 1716; Brzozowiec; Son of Christian Ulrich II and Philippine Charlotte of Roedern-Krappitz	1744 – 14 December 1792	Duchy of Oels	Marie Sophie Wilhelmine of Solms-Laubach (1721-1793); 8 April 1741; Laubach three children	14 December 1792; Oleśnica aged 76	Left no male descendants. His duchy was inherited by his already widowed son-in-law, from the House of Welf.
Oels was annexed to the Duchy of Brunswick-Lüneburg
Louis Eugene	6 January 1731; Frankfurt am Main; Second son of Charles Alexander and Marie Auguste of Thurn and Taxis	24 October 1793 – 20 May 1795	Duchy of Württemberg	Countess Sophia Albertine of Beichlingen (15 December 1728-10 May 1807); 10/11 January 1785 (morganatic) three children	20 May 1795; Ludwigsburg aged 64	He had only married morganatically, and as so his children couldn't succeed him; the duchy went to his brother.
Frederick II Eugene	21 January 1732; Stuttgart; Third son of Charles Alexander and Marie Auguste of Thurn and Taxis	20 May 1795 – 23 December 1797	Duchy of Württemberg	Friederike of Brandenburg-Schwedt; 29 November 1753 twelve children	23 December 1797; Hohenheim aged 65	
The Holy Roman Empire came to an end in 1806. The Elector of Württemberg, allied to Napoleon, anticipated its dissolution by becoming the ruler of an independent Kingdom of Württemberg in 1806.
Frederick III & I	6 November 1754; Trzebiatów; Son of Frederick II Eugene and Friederike of Brandenburg-Schwedt	23 December 1797 – 30 October 1816	Duchy of Württemberg (until 25 February 1803) Electorate of Württemberg (25 February 1803 – 6 August 1806) Kingdom of Württemberg (from 6 August 1806)	Augusta of Brunswick-Wolfenbüttel; 15 October 1780; Brunswick four children Charlotte of Great Britain; 18 May 1797; London no children	30 October 1816; Stuttgart aged 61	In 1803, Frederick was raised to the rank of Elector of the Holy Roman Empire. In 1806, the Empire was dissolved, and the Elector of Württemberg became an independent monarch with the title of King, with approval of Napoleon Bonaparte.
William I	27 September 1781; Lubin; Son of Frederick III & I and Augusta of Brunswick-Wolfenbüttel	30 October 1816 – 25 June 1864	Kingdom of Württemberg	Caroline Augusta of Bavaria; 8 June 1808; Munich (divorced in 1814) no children Grand Duchess Catherine Pavlovna of Russia; 30 October 1816; Saint Petersburg four children Pauline Therese of Württemberg; 15 April 1820; Stuttgart three children	25 June 1864; Stuttgart aged 82	
Charles	6 March 1823; Stuttgart; Son of William I and Pauline Therese of Württemberg	25 June 1864 – 6 October 1891	Kingdom of Württemberg	Olga Nikolaevna of Russia; 13 July 1846; Saint Petersburg no children	6 October 1891; Stuttgart aged 68	Became a subordinate ruler in the German Empire after the Unification of Germany in 1871.
William II	25 February 1848; Stuttgart; Son of Prince Frederick of Württemberg and Princess Catherine of Württemberg	6 October 1891 – 30 November 1918	Kingdom of Württemberg	Marie of Waldeck and Pyrmont; 15 February 1877; Arolsen three children Charlotte of Schaumburg-Lippe; 8 April 1886; Bückeburg no children	2 October 1921; Bebenhausen aged 73	Paternal nephew and maternal cousin of Charles, William was the last King of Württemberg. Abdicated in the German Revolution of 1918–1919.

Because of a lack of male heirs under Salic law, on the death of Wilhelm II in 1921 the royal house had to reach back to the descendants of Friedrich II Eugen (ruled 1795–97). The line of the Duke of Urach was excluded because of a morganatic marriage back in 1800 by its forebear Duke William, and so the succession devolved to the younger branch of Altshausen.

Another morganatic descendant of Friedrich II Eugen was Mary of Teck (1867–1953), who married the British king George V when he was Duke of York.

== See also ==
- List of Württembergish royal consorts
- List of presidents of Württemberg (1918–1945)
- House of Württemberg
- History of Baden-Württemberg
- Coat of arms of Württemberg
