= Julius Siegmund, Duke of Württemberg-Juliusburg =

- Born: 18 August 1653; Oleśnica
- Died: 15 October 1684 (aged 31); Dobroszyce
- Noble family: House of Württemberg
- Spouse: Anna Sophia of Mecklenburg-Schwerin
- Father: Silvius I Nimrod, Duke of Württemberg-Oels
- Mother: Elisabeth Marie, Duchess of Oels

Duke Julius Siegmund of Württemberg-Juliusburg (18 August 1653 in Oleśnica – 15 October 1684 in Dobroszyce) was Duke of Württemberg-Juliusburg.

== Life ==
Julius Siegmund was the fourth son of the Duke Silvius I Nimrod of Württemberg-Oels (1622–1664) from his marriage to Elisabeth Marie, Duchess of Oels (1625–1686) .

After his father's death in 1664, his mother initially ruled the Duchy of Oels as regent for her four sons. The sons went on their Grand Tour and visited, among other countries, the Netherlands, where the eldest brother Charles Ferdinand died in 1669.

In 1672, the elder brothers took up government and divided the country. Julius Siegmund, who was still under the regency of his mother, received Międzybórz. His older brother Silvius II Frederick received Oels and Christian Ulrich I received Bernstadt.

In 1673, Elisabeth Marie stepped down as regent and Julius Siegmund began to rule himself. He chose the village of Dreske as his residence. He expanded the castle in the village to a baroque residence. He name the castle and the village Juliusburg, after himself.

Julius Siegmund was a member of the Fruitbearing Society, under the nickname der Unverwelkte ("the unwithered one").

== Marriage and issue ==
Julius Siegmund married on 4 April 1677 in Grabow with Anna Sophia (1647–1726), the daughter of the Adolf Frederick I of Mecklenburg-Schwerin. They had the following children:

- Marie Sophie (1678–1681)
- Leopold Frederick (1680–1681)
- Charles (1682–1745), Duke of Württemberg-Bernstadt

married in 1703 with Princess Wilhelmine Louise of Saxe-Meiningen (1686-1753)
