= Charles, Duke of Württemberg-Bernstadt =

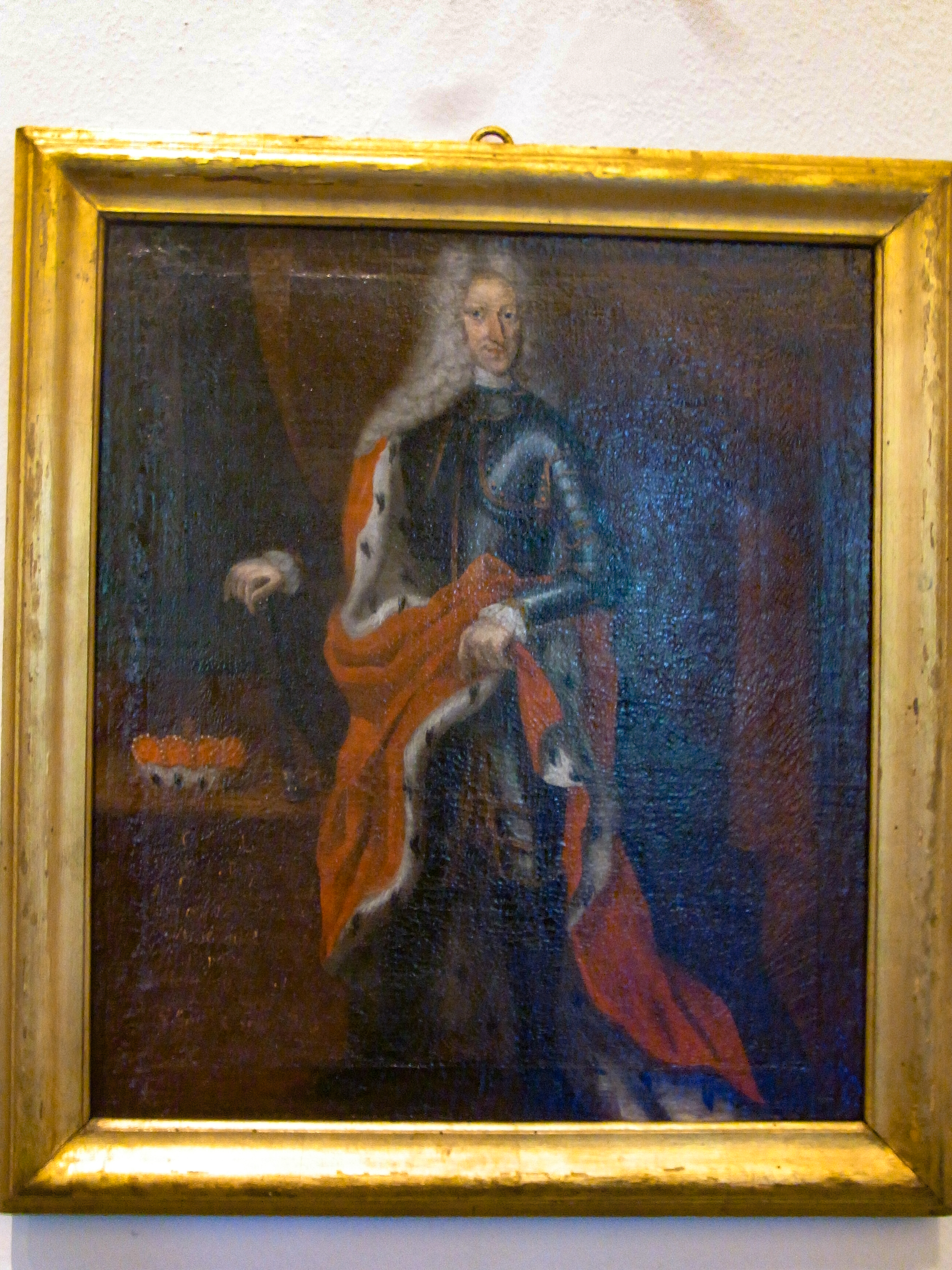
- Born: 11 March 1682; Dobroszyce
- Died: 8 February 1745 (aged 62); Bierutów
- Noble family: House of Württemberg
- Father: Julius Siegmund, Duke of Württemberg-Juliusburg
- Mother: Anna Sophia of Mecklenburg-Schwerin

Duke Charles of Württemberg-Bernstadt (11 March 1682 in Dobroszyce – 8 February 1745 in Bierutów) was Duke of Württemberg-Bernstadt.

== Life ==
Karl was the only surviving child of the Duke Julius Siegmund of Württemberg-Juliusburg (1653–1684) from his marriage to Anna Sophia (1647–1726), the daughter of the Duke Adolf Frederick I of Mecklenburg-Schwerin. He became Duke of Württemberg-Juliusburg when his father died in 1684, although he stood under guardianship until he came of age in 1704. When his uncle Silvius II Frederick died in 1697, his uncle Christian Ulrich I took over the Duchy of Oels and left the Duchy of Bernstadt to Charles. On 20 December 1703 in Meiningen, he married Wilhelmine Louise (1686–1753), the daughter of Duke Bernhard I of Saxe-Meiningen. The marriage remained childless.

Charles ruled arbitrarily and wastefully. In 1740, his councilors therefore turned to emperor Joseph I, who ruled against the Duke. In 1742, Karl asked his country's captain for a new wig, however, it was not granted due to an empty treasury. He then sold off the Lordship of Goschütz and the city of Twardogóra, the latter to Count Henry of Reichenbach-Goschütz (1705–1775).

Charles died in 1745. Since his marriage had been childless, the Duchy of Bernstadt fell to his cousin Charles Christian Erdmann, who was thus able to unite all the Silesian possessions of the House of Württemberg in a single hand.
