= Christian Ulrich I of Württemberg-Oels =

Christian Ulrich I, Duke of Württemberg-Oels
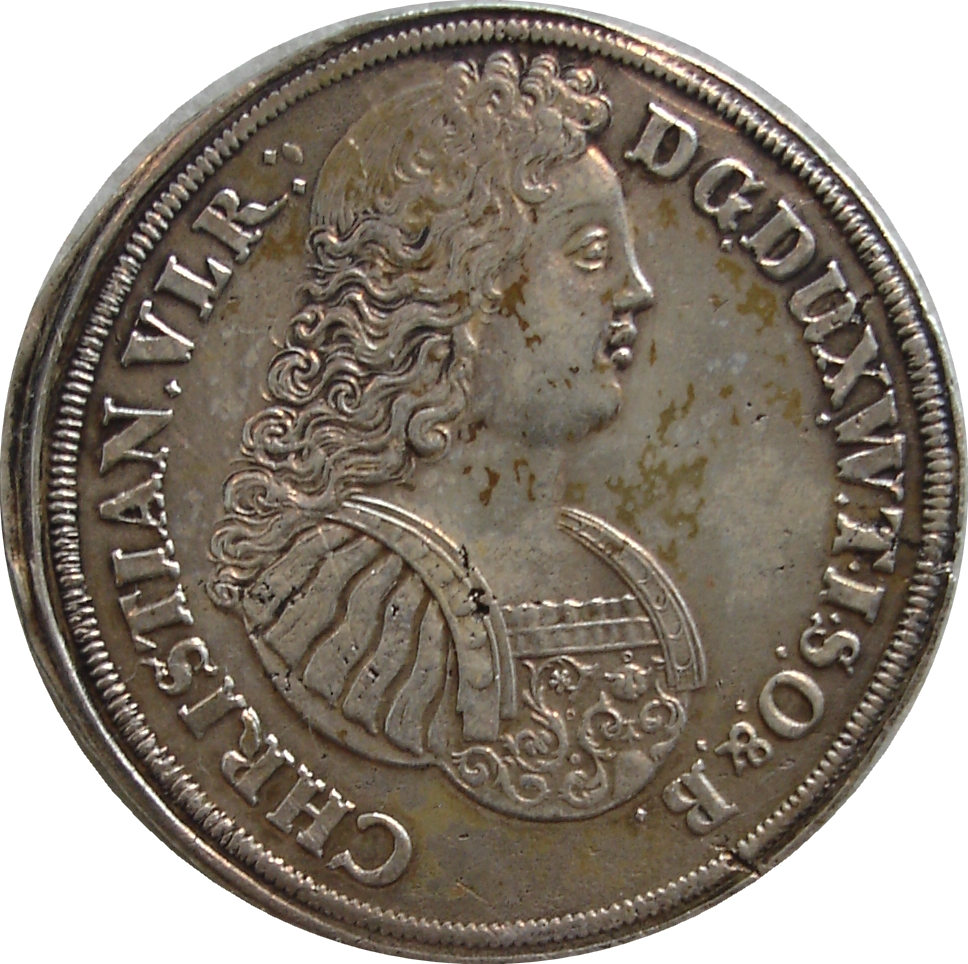
- Christian Ulrich thaler 1681, Oels
- Born: 9 April 1652; Oels Castle in Oels
- Died: 5 April 1704 (aged 51); Oels Castle in Oels
- Noble family: House of Württemberg
- Spouses: Anna Elisabeth of Anhalt-Bernburg; Sibylle Maria of Saxe-Merseburg; Sophie Wilhelmine of East Frisia; Sophia of Mecklenburg-Güstrow
- Father: Silvius I Nimrod, Duke of Württemberg-Oels
- Mother: Elisabeth Marie, Duchess of Oels

Duke Christian Ulrich I of Württemberg-Oels (9 April 1652, at Oels Castle in Oels – 5 April 1704, in Oels Castle) was a German nobleman. He was the ruling Duke of Württemberg-Bernstadt from 1669 to 1697 and then the ruling Duke of Oels-Württemberg from 1697 until his death.

== Descent ==
Christian Ulrich I was the third son of Duke Silvius I Nimrod of Württemberg-Oels from his marriage with Duchess Elisabeth Marie, a daughter of Duke Charles Frederick I Poděbrady, Duke of Oels and Anne Sophie of Saxe-Weimar.

== Reign ==
When his oldest brother Charles Ferdinand died in 1669, Christian Ulrich inherited the Duchy of Bernstadt.

When his older brother Silvius II Frederick died in 1697, Christian Ulrich inherited the Duchy of Oels, Christian Ulrich kept the Duchies of Oels and Dobroszyce with Międzybórz and parts of Trebnitz and transferred Bernstadt to his nephew Charles.

In 1698, Christian Ulrich built a ducal crypt as an extension of Castle Church of St. John. He began a significant collection of books and art at Oels Castle. In 1685, he purchased the town of Neudorf from Balthasar Wilhelm von Prittwitz, Lord of Rastelwitz. Between 1685 and 1692, he constructed a baroque castle at Neudorf, which he named Sibyllenort, after his second wife, Marie Sibylle of Saxe-Merseburg.

He died on 5 April 1704, aged 51, at Oels Castle and was buried in the ducal crypt he had built.

== Marriage and issue ==
He completed his first marriage, on 13 March 1672 in Bernburg with Anna Elisabeth of Anhalt-Bernburg, daughter of Prince Christian II of Anhalt-Bernburg and Eleonora Sophia of Schleswig-Holstein Sonderburg. With her he had seven children:

1. Louise Elisabeth (born: 22 February 1673 in Bernstadt; died: 28 April 1736 in Forst), Princess of Württemberg-Oels, married Duke Philip of Saxe-Merseburg-Lauchstädt.
2. Christian Ulrich (born: 21 February 1674 in Bernstadt; died: 2 July 1674 in Bernstadt), Hereditary Prince of Württemberg-Oels.
3. Leopold Viktor (born: 22 May 1675 in Bernstadt; died: 30 April 1676 in Bernstadt), Hereditary Prince of Württemberg-Oels.
4. Fredericka Christine (born: 13 May 1676 in Bernstadt; died: 3 June 1676 in Bernstadt), Princess of Württemberg-Oels.
5. Sophie Angelika (born: 30 May 1677 in Bernstadt; died: 11 November 1700 in Pegau), Princess of Württemberg-Oels, married Duke Frederick Henry of Saxe-Zeitz-Pegau-Neustadt.
6. Eleonore Amöena (born: 21 October 1678 in Breslau; died: 2 April 1679 in Bernstadt), Princess of Württemberg-Oels.
7. Theodosia (born: 20 July 1680 in Bernstadt; died: 21 September 1680 in Bernstadt), Princess of Württemberg-Oels.

He completed his second marriage, on 27 October 1683 in Doberlug with Sibylle Maria (born: 28 October 1667; died: 9 October 1693), daughter of Duke Christian I of Saxe-Merseburg and Christiana of Schleswig-Holstein-Sonderburg-Glücksburg. With her he had seven more children:

1. Christine Marie (born: 17 August 1685 in Bernstadt; died: 24 March 1696 in Bernstadt), Princess of Württemberg-Oels.
2. Christian Erdmann (born July 24, 1686, in Merseburg; died: 8 July 1689 in Merseburg), Hereditary Prince of Württemberg-Oels.
3. Eleonore Hedwig (born July 11, 1687, in Bernstadt; died: 25 October 1688 in Bernstadt), Princess of Württemberg-Oels
4. Ulrike Erdmuthe (born February 5, 1689, in Breslau; died: 5 September 1690 in Bernstadt), Princess of Württemberg-Oels.
5. Charles Frederick (born: 7 February 1690 at Merseburg; died: 14 December 1761 in Oels), Duke of Württemberg-Oels-Juliusburg, married Sibylle Juliane Charlotte of Württemberg-Weiltingen.
6. Christian Ulrich II (born: 27 January 1691 at Vielguth Castle in Oels; died: 11 February 1734 in Stuttgart), Duke of Württemberg-Wilhelminenort, married Philippine Charlotte of Redern-Krappitz.
7. Elisabeth Sibylle (born: 19 March 1693 in Delitzsch; died: 21 February 1694 in Delitzsch), Princess of Württemberg-Oels.

He concluded his third marriage, on 4 February 1695 in Hamburg with Sophie Wilhelmine of East Frisia (born: 17 October 1659; died: 4 February 1698), daughter of Prince Enno Louis Cirksena of East Frisia and Juliana Sophia Justina of Barby-Mühlingen. With her he had one daughter:

1. Auguste Louise (born: 21 January 1698 in Bernstadt, died: 4 January 1739 at Castle Skarsine Trebnitz), Princess of Württemberg-Oels, married Georg Albrecht of Saxe-Weissenfels, Count of Barby.

He concluded his fourth marriage, on 6 December 1700 in Güstrow with Sophia (born: 21 June 1662; died: 1 June 1738), a daughter of Duke Gustav Adolph of Mecklenburg-Güstrow and Magdalene Sibylle of Schleswig-Holstein-Gottorp. This marriage remained childless.

Christian Ulrich I of Württemberg-Oels House of Württemberg Born: 9 April 1652
Preceded by Charles Ferdinand	Duke of Württemberg-Bernstadt; 1669-1697	Succeeded by Charles
Preceded by Silvius II Frederick	Duke of Württemberg-Oels; 1697-1704	Succeeded by Charles Frederick II
Preceded by Charles	Duke of Württemberg-Juliusburg; 1697-1704	Succeeded by Charles Frederick II
Preceded by New creation	Duke of Württemberg-Wilhelminenort; 1697-1704	Succeeded by Christian Ulrich II
