= Charles Frederick II of Württemberg-Oels =

Charles Frederick II, Duke of Württemberg-Oels
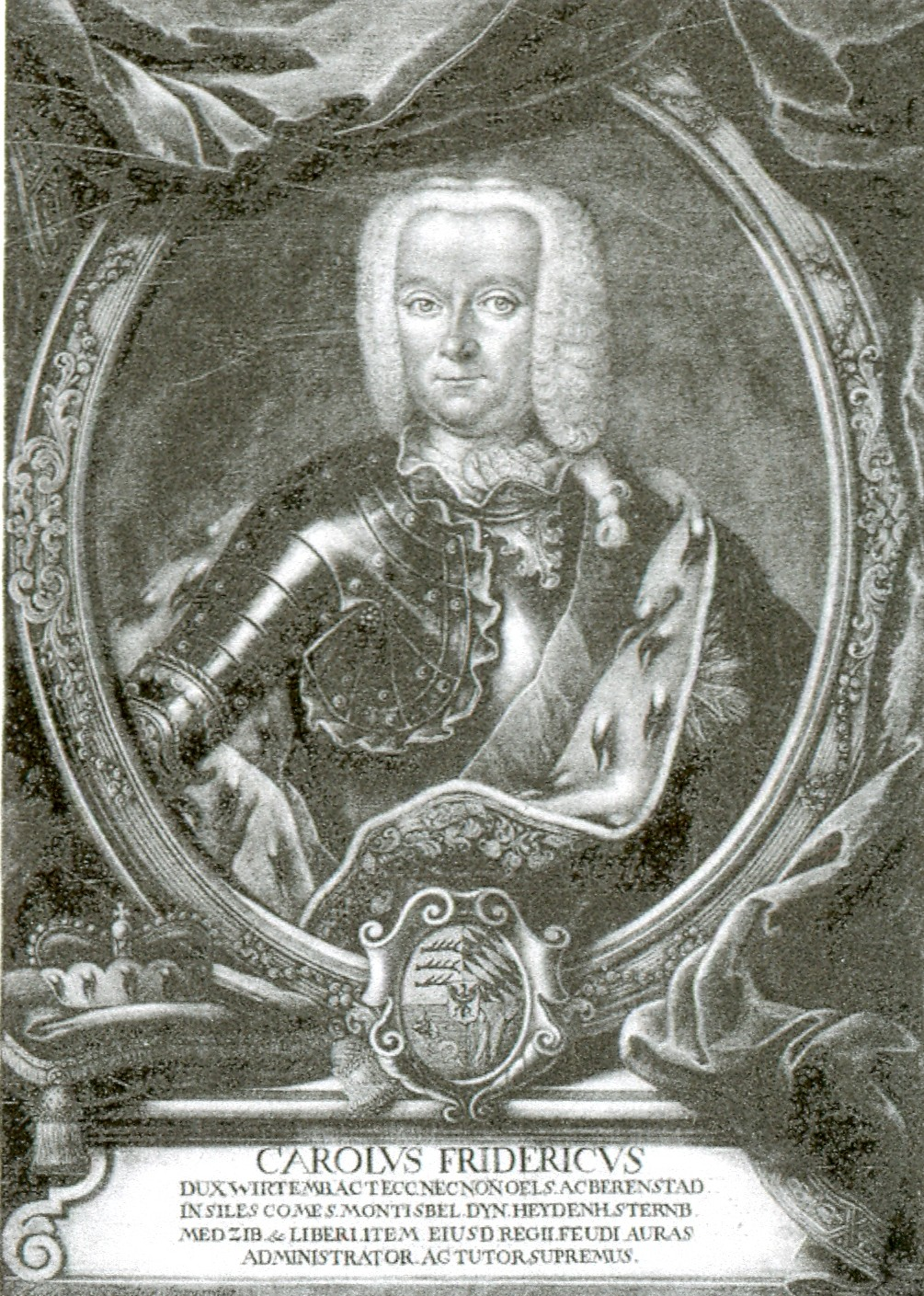
- Charles Frederick II, Duke of Württemberg-Oels
- Born: 7 February 1690; Merseburg
- Died: 14 December 1761 (aged 71); Oleśnica
- Noble family: House of Württemberg
- Spouse: Sibylle Charlotte Juliane of Württemberg-Weiltingen
- Father: Christian Ulrich I, Duke of Württemberg-Oels
- Mother: Sibylle Marie of Saxe-Merseburg

Charles Frederick II of Württemberg-Oels (7 February 1690 in Merseburg – 14 December 1761 in Oleśnica) was a Duke of Oels-Württemberg and Regent of the Duchy of Württemberg.

== Life ==
Charles Frederick was a son of the Duke Christian Ulrich I of Württemberg-Oels (1652–1704) from his second marriage to Duchess Sibylle Marie of Saxe-Merseburg (1667–1693), daughter of the Duke Christian I of Saxe-Merseburg. When his father died in 1704, Charles Frederick was still a minor, so he stood under guardianship until he was declared an adult in 1707.

Charles Frederick married on 21 April 1709 in Stuttgart with Sibylle Charlotte (1690–1735), the daughter of Duke Frederick Ferdinand of Württemberg-Weiltingen, a grandson of Julius Frederick, Duke of Württemberg-Weiltingen.

From 1738, he acted as guardian of Duke Charles Eugene and regent of Württemberg. In this rôle, he succeeded Duke Charles Rudolph of Württemberg-Neuenstadt, who had resigned from the regency for reasons of old age. During his time as regent, the War of the Austrian Succession broke out in 1740. In 1742, the Treaty of Breslau awarded his homeland Silesia to Prussia. Nevertheless, Charles Frederick and his successors did not participate in this war. During his regency, the administration was significantly improved and good relations with the Estates were restored. Georg Bernhard Bilfinger, Johann Eberhard Georgii and Frederick Augustus von Hardenberg served as ministers in his government.

In 1744, Emperor Charles VII declared Charles Eugene an adult, thereby ending Charles Frederick time as regent of Württemberg.

Charles Frederick's marriage remained childless. In 1744, he resigned from the government in Oels, in favour of the son of his younger brother Charles Christian Erdmann. He then resided for some time in Międzybórz, and then moved to Oels, where he died in 1761, at the age of 72.

== Bibliography ==
- Johann Christian Benjamin Regehly: Geschichte und Beschreibung von Carlsruhe in Oberschlesien, p. 30
- Karl Friedrich Pauli: Allgemeine preussische staats-geschichte, samt aller dazu gehörigen ..., p. 562
- Carl Pfaff: Fürstenhaus und Land Württemberg ..., p. 141

Charles Frederick II of Württemberg-Oels House of Württemberg Born: 7 February 1690 Died: 14 December 1761
Preceded by Christian Ulrich I	Duke of Württemberg-Oels; 1704-1744	Succeeded by Charles Christian Erdmann
