= Ludwig II of Württemberg =

12th century count of Württemberg

Ludwig II (c. 1137–1181) was the count of Württemberg from 1158 to 1181.

He was married to Willibirg (1142–1179), daughter of Hartmann III, Count of Kirchberg and had issue:

- Hartmann, Count of Württemberg
- Ludwig III, Count of Württemberg

Preceded by Ludwig I	Count of Württemberg; 1158–1181	Succeeded by Hartmann
