= Christian Ulrich II of Württemberg-Wilhelminenort =

Christian Ulrich II, Duke of Württemberg-Wilhelminenort
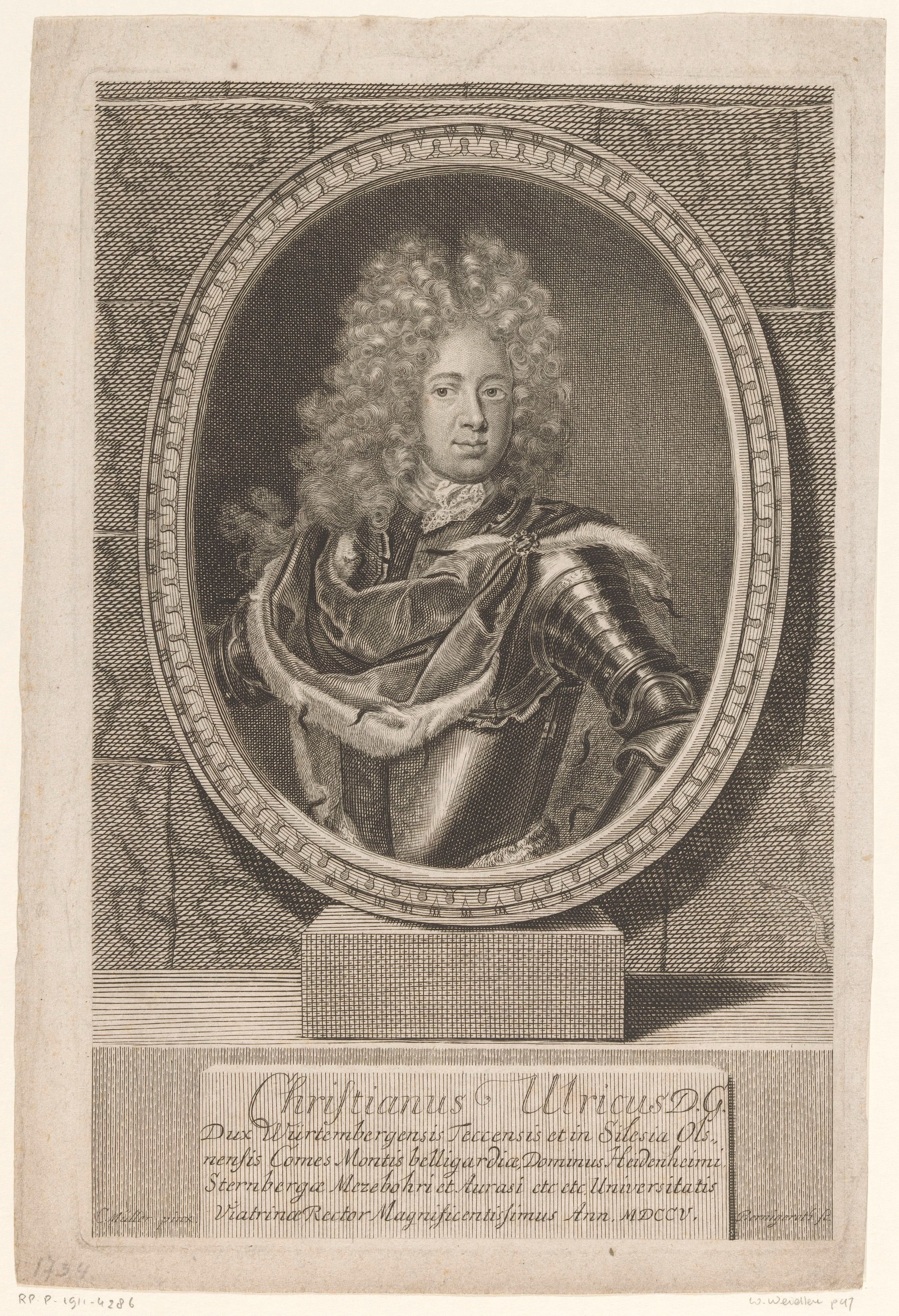
- Born: 27 January 1691; Vielguth Castle in Oleśnica
- Died: 7 February 1734 (aged 43); Stuttgart
- Noble family: House of Württemberg
- Spouse: Philippine Charlotte of Redern-Krappitz
- Father: Christian Ulrich I, Duke of Württemberg-Oels
- Mother: Sibylle Marie of Saxe-Merseburg

Duke Christian Ulrich II of Württemberg-Wilhelminenort (27 January 1691 at Vielguth Castle nearby Oleśnica – 7 February 1734 in Stuttgart) was Duke of Württemberg-Wilhelminenort.

== Life ==
Christian Ulrich II was the youngest son of the Duke Christian Ulrich I of Württemberg-Oels (1652-1704) from his second marriage to Princess Sibylle Marie of Saxe-Merseburg (1667-1693), the daughter of Duke Christian I, Duke of Saxe-Merseburg. Christian Ulrich II studied in Frankfurt (Oder) and at the Military Academy in Berlin.

Christian Ulrich II resided as a Paréage Lord at the country estate of Wilhelminenort, the former village of Bresewitz (near Bierutów), that had been renamed in honor of his stepmother, Princess Sophie Wilhelmine of East Frisia (1659-1698). He converted to Catholicism on 26 January 1723, during a trip to Rome, and he pronounced the formula of abjuration from lutheranism, before Pope Innocent XIII.

He died in 1734 in Stuttgart at the age of 43. His son was chosen by his childless older brother to succeed him as Duke of Oels.

== Marriage and issue ==
Christian Ulrich II married on 13 July 1711 Philippine Charlotte (18 February 1691 - Oels, 17 June 1758), a daughter of Count Erdmann of Redern-Krappitz (1659-1712), with whom he had six children:

1. Elisabeth Sophie Charlotte (Wilhelminenort, 21 June 1714 - Wilhelminenort, 20 April 1716).
2. Ulrike Louise (Wilhelminenort, 21 May 1715 - Oels, 17 May 1748), canoness at Gandersheim Abbey.
3. Charles Christian Erdmann (Wilhelminenort, 26 October 1716 - Oels, 14 December 1792), Duke of Württemberg-Oels.
4. Wilhelmine Philippine (Wilhelminenort, 10 November 1719 - Wilhelminenort, 2 December 1719).
5. Franziska Charlotte Jakobine (Wilhelminenort, 1 June 1724 - Krappitz, 28 April 1728).
6. Fredericka Johanna (Wilhelminenort, 17 October 1725 - Wilhelminenort, 25 October 1726).
