= Elisabeth Marie, Duchess of Oels =

Silesian duchess and last member of the House of Poděbrady

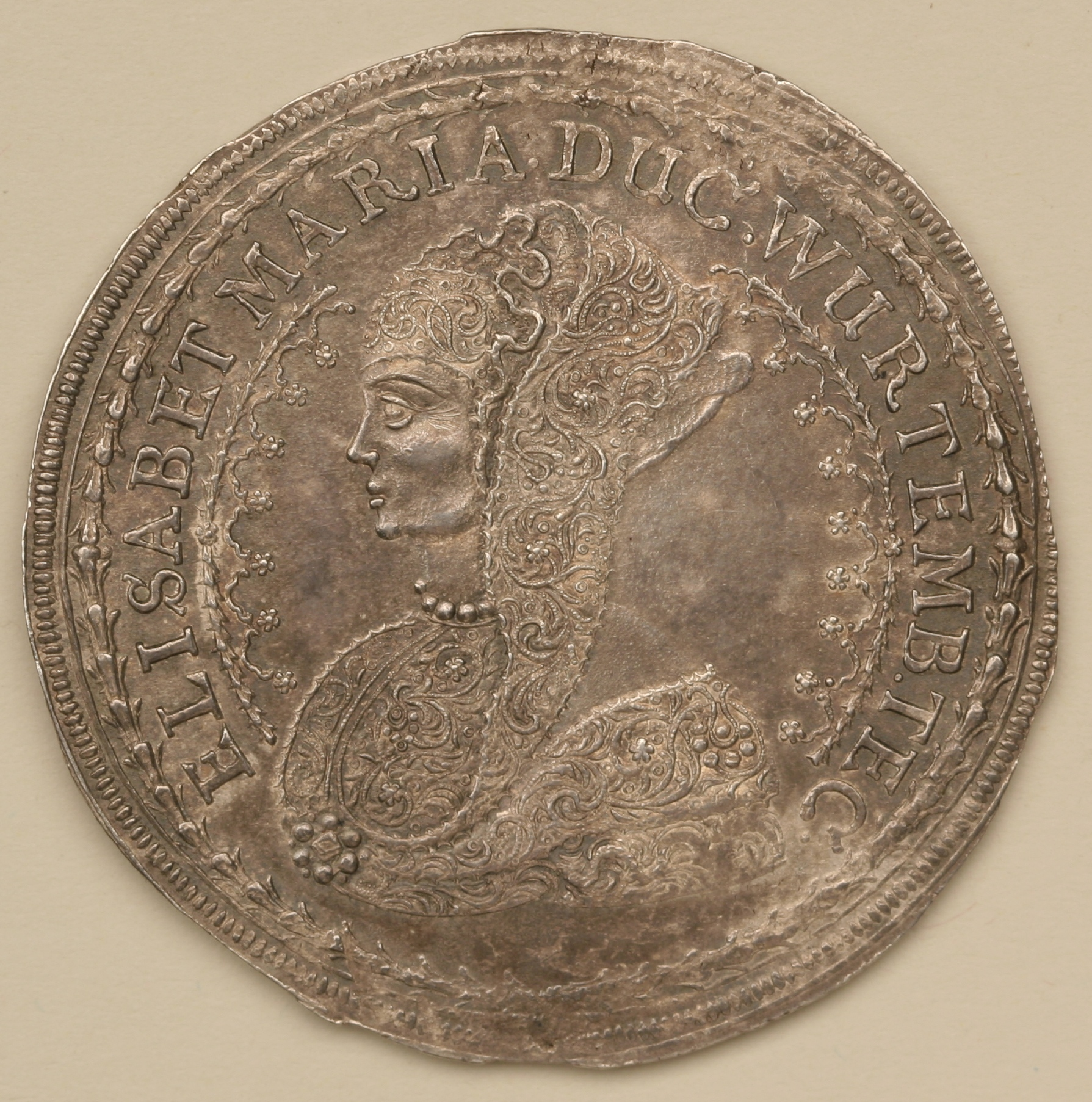
- Coin showing Elisabeth Marie of Oels
- Born: 11 May 1625; Oels, Silesia
- Died: 17 March 1686 (aged 60); Oels
- Noble family: House of Poděbrady
- Spouse: Silvius I Nimrod, Duke of Württemberg-Oels
- Father: Charles Frederick I, Duke of Münsterberg-Oels
- Mother: Anna Sophia of Saxe-Weimar

Elisabeth Marie of Oels (11 May 1625 – 17 March 1686) was the last member of the House of Poděbrady and a regent of the Duchy of Oels.

== Life ==
Elizabeth Marie was the only child of Duke Charles Frederick I of Münsterberg-Oels (1593–1647) from his first marriage with Anna Sophia (1598–1641), daughter of Duke Frederick William I of Saxe-Weimar.

On 1 May 1647 Mary Elizabeth married at Oels Duke Silvius Nimrod of Württemberg-Juliusburg. Her father died later that month, on the 31st. He had been the last male member of the House of Poděbrady and he had hoped he could pass the duchy to his daughter. Already in 1638, he had declared Oels to be a "women fief". Emperor Ferdinand III, however, raised objections. In 1648, a compromise was reached: the Moravian dominion of Jevišovice was ceded to the emperor and the emperor invested Sylvius Nimrod with the Duchies of Oels and Bernstadt. The Poděbrady family retained the Moravian dominion of Šternberk; the Duchy of Münsterberg was declared vacant and fell back to the Emperor. The Emperor combined the coats of arms of Elizabeth Marie and Silvius Nimrod.

In 1652, Elizabeth Marie and Silvius Nimrod founded the Ducal Württemberg-Oelsian Order of the Skull.

After Silvius Nimrod died in 1664, Elizabeth Marie and Dukes Christian of Brieg and August of Legnica acted jointly as regent for her four minor sons. When the older sons reached adulthood, they divided the duchy in 1672 and the following year Elisabeth Marie laid down the guardianship of her youngest son.

== Issue ==
From her marriage, Elizabeth Marie had the following children:

- Charles Ferdinand (1650–1669)
- Anna Sophia (1650–1669)
- Silvius II Frederick (1651–1697), Duke of Württemberg-Oels

married in 1672 Eleonore Charlotte of Württemberg-Montbéliard (1656–1743)

- Christian Ulrich I (1652–1704), Duke of Württemberg-Bernstadt, married

firstly, in 1672, Anna Elisabeth of Anhalt-Bernburg (1647–1680)
secondly, in 1683, Sybille Marie of Saxe-Merseburg (1667–1693)
thirdly 1695 Sophie Wilhelmine of East Frisia (1659–1698)
fourthly 1700 Sophie of Mecklenburg-Güstrow (1662–1738)

- Julius Siegmund (1653–1684), Duke of Württemberg-Juliusburg

married in 1677 Anna Sophia of Mecklenburg-Schwerin (1647–1726)

- Kunigunde Juliana (1655–1655)
- Sylvius (1660–1660)
