= Hartmann, Count of Württemberg =

Hartmann I
- Count of Württemberg
- Reign: 1181–1236 (jointly with Ludwig III until 1226)
- Predecessor: Ludwig II
- Successor: Ulrich I
- Born: c. 1160
- Died: 1240
- Noble family: House of Württemberg
- Father: Ludwig II, Count of Württemberg

Hartmann I (1160–19 August 1240) was the Count of Württemberg.

Hartmann I and his brother Ludwig III both called themselves “Count of Württemberg” at the time, so it is assumed that they administered the county together. They were both sons of Count Ludwig II. Hartmann accompanied Otto IV to Rome for his coronation as Holy Roman Emperor and served repeatedly as a witness in documents set up by the emperor in Italy. After the election of Frederick II of Swabia as king and emperor, Hartmann and his brother switched their support to Frederick and later supported his eventual successor Henry VII.

Around 1200, Hartmann married the heiress to the county of Veringen in Upper Swabia, thus acquiring lands including Altshausen, Burg Alt-Veringen and the county of eastern Apphagaues.

This article is translated (poorly) from that on the German Wikipedia

Preceded by Ludwig II	Count of Württemberg; 1181–1236 With Ludwig III (1194–1226)	Succeeded by Ulrich I
