= Silvius II Frederick of Württemberg-Oels =

Silvius II Frederick, Duke of Württemberg-Oels
- Born: 21 February 1651; Oleśnica
- Died: 3 June 1697 (aged 46); Oleśnica
- Noble family: House of Württemberg
- Spouse: Eleonore Charlotte of Württemberg-Montbéliard
- Father: Silvius I Nimrod, Duke of Württemberg-Oels
- Mother: Elisabeth Marie, Duchess of Oels

Duke Silvius II Frederick of Wurttemberg-Oels (February 21st, 1651 in Oleśnica – June 3rd 1697 in Olesnica) was the Duke of Württemberg-Oels from 1668 until his death in 1697.

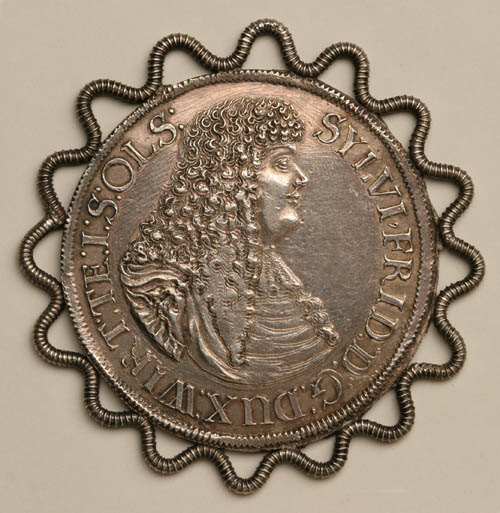

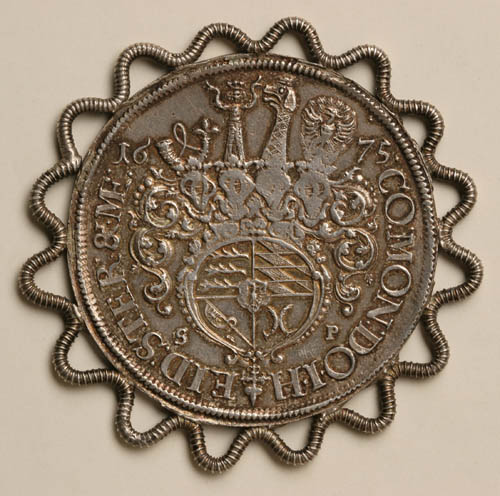

== Life ==
Silvius Frederick was second son of the Duke Silvius I Nimrod of Württemberg-Oels (1622–1664) from his marriage to Elisabeth Marie, Duchess of Oels (1625–1686) .

After his father's death in 1664, his mother took up government as regent for her four sons. Silvius Nimrod and his older brother Charles Ferdinand went on a Grand Tour. Charles Ferdinand died in 1668, when they were visiting the Netherlands.

The remaining three brothers divided the country in 1672: Silvius Frederick received Oels; his brother Christian Ulrich I received Bernstadt and his youngest brother Julius Siegmund received Międzybórz and Třebenice. As Julius was still a minor, Silvius Frederick acted as his regent until he came of age. In the Chamber of Princes, the three brothers had to share their single vote.

Silvius Frederick married on 7 May 1672 in Oels with Eleonore Charlotte (1656–1743), the daughter of the Duke George II of Württemberg-Montbéliard. The marriage remained childless.

He was a member of the Fruitbearing Society under the nickname der Schützende ("the Protector").

Silvius Frederick died in 1697, without leaving an heir. By order of his mother, Oels fell to her next younger son, Christian Ulrich I.
