= Karl Friedrich I of Münsterberg-Oels =

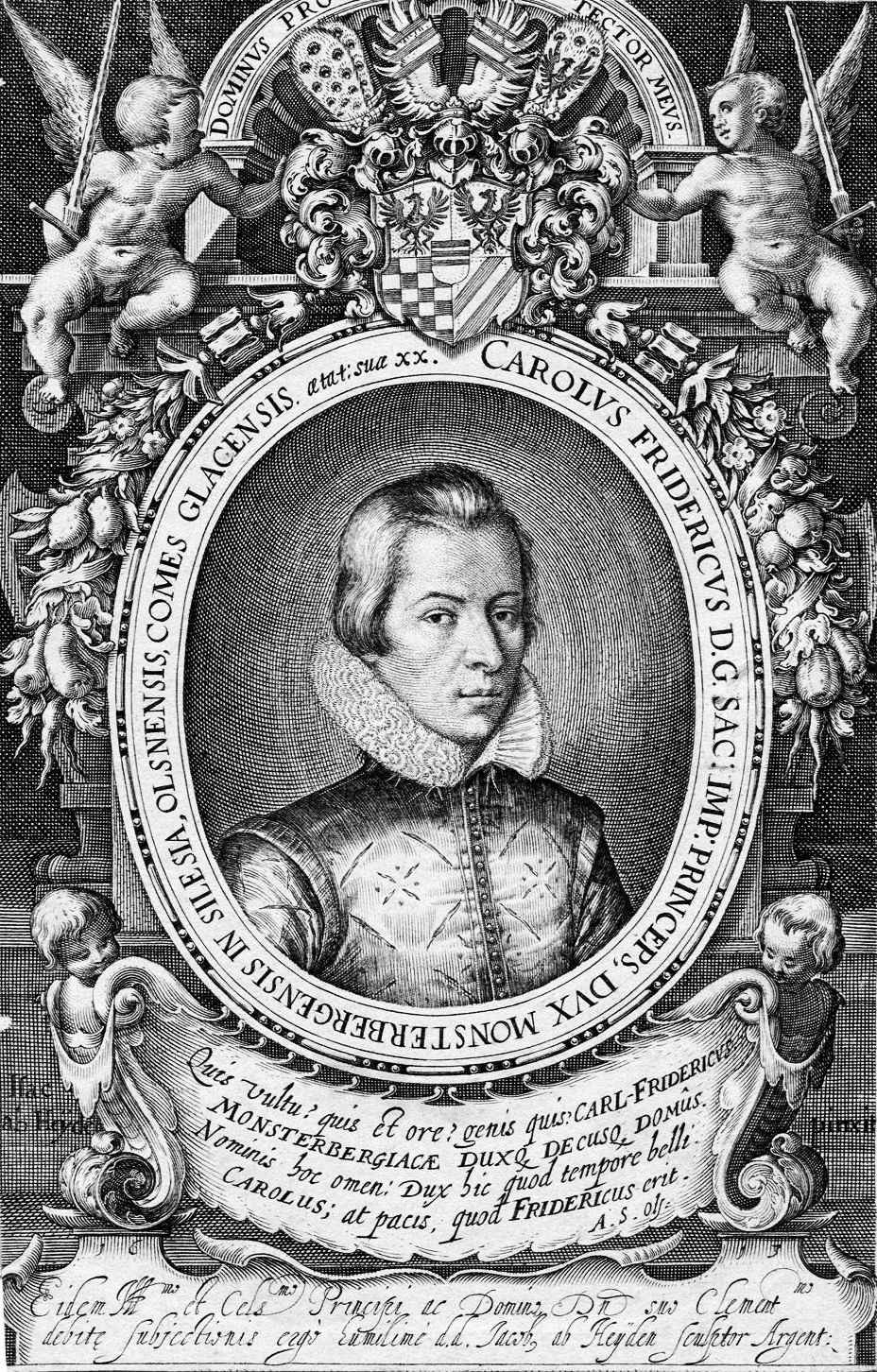
- Karl Friedrich I of Münsterberg-Oels - engraving by Jacob van der Heyden (1613)
- Born: 18 October 1593; Oels, Silesia
- Died: 31 May 1647 (aged 53); Oels
- Noble family: House of Poděbrady
- Spouses: Anna Sophie of Saxe-Altenburg; Sophie Magdalene of Brzeg
- Issue: Elisabeth Marie, Duchess of Oels
- Father: Karl II, Duke of Münsterberg-Oels
- Mother: Elisabeth Magdalena of Brzeg

Karl Friedrich I of Münsterberg-Oels (also: Karl Friedrich I of Poděbrady; German: Karl Friedrich I. von Oels und Münsterberg or Karl Friedrich I. von Podiebrad; Czech: Karel Bedřich z Minstrberka; 18 October 1593, Oleśnica – 31 May 1647, Oleśnica) was Duke of Oels from 1617 to 1647 and Duke of Bernstadt from 1639 to 1647. He also held the titles of Duke of Münsterberg and Count of Glatz.

== Life ==
Karl Friedrich was a member of the Münsterberg branch of the Bohemian noble Poděbrady family. His parents were Karl II, Duke of Münsterberg-Oels and Elisabeth Magdalena (1562–1630), daughter of Duke George II of Brieg.

After his father's death in 1617 Karl Friedrich took over the government of the Duchy of Oels. At the same time, he inherited jointly with his older brother Henry Wenceslaus, the Moravian estates Šternberk and Jevišovice. After Henry Wenceslaus's death in 1639, Karl Friedrich ruled these estates alone.

He married in 1618 to Anna Sophie of Saxe-Altenburg, daughter of Friedrich Wilhelm I, Duke of Saxe-Weimar.

In 1619 Karl Friedrich was at the head of an embassy that had been sent to Prague by the Silesian Princes and Estates to invite the newly elected King of Bohemia Frederick V to an inaugural visit to Wrocław. In February 1620, during Frederick V's journey to Wrocław, Charles Frederick and his brother Henry Wenceslaus welcomed the new king in their North Moravian town of Šternberk.

In defense of the freedom of religion and the desire for political interference, Karl Friedrich and the Dukes John Christian of Brieg and George Rudolf of Liegnitz and the City Council of Wrocław founded on 9 August 1633 a league (German: Konjunktion) which stood under the protection of Saxony, Brandenburg and Sweden. This caused Karl Friedrich and his allies to lose the favor of the Emperor. After the Peace of Prague of 1635, they had to therefore make amends.

After the death of his brother Henry Wenceslaus in 1639, Karl Friedrich succeeded him as duke of Bernstadt. In 1642 he married second wife, Sophie Magdalene (1624–1660), daughter of Duke John Christian of Brieg.

Karl Friedrich was the last male descendant from the Münsterberg line of the Poděbrady family in Oels. Through the marriage of his only daughter, Elisabeth Maria with Silvius Nimrod, Oels and the Bohemian estate of Šternberk came in the possession of the House of Württemberg.

== References and sources ==
- Ludwig Petry, Josef Joachim Menzel (eds.): Geschichte Schlesiens. vol. 2, ISBN 3-7995-6342-3, p. 62 ff
- Hugo Weczerka: Handbuch der historischen Stätten: Schlesien, Stuttgart, 1977, ISBN 3-520-31601-3, p. LXIV, 19 and 369 as well as genealogical tables on p. 602-603
- Colmar Grünhagen: Geschichte Schlesiens, vol. 2, Friedrich Andreas Perthes, Gotha, 1886, p. 67, 180
