= Charles Christian Erdmann, Duke of Württemberg-Oels =

Ruling duke of Württemberg-Oels and Bernstadt

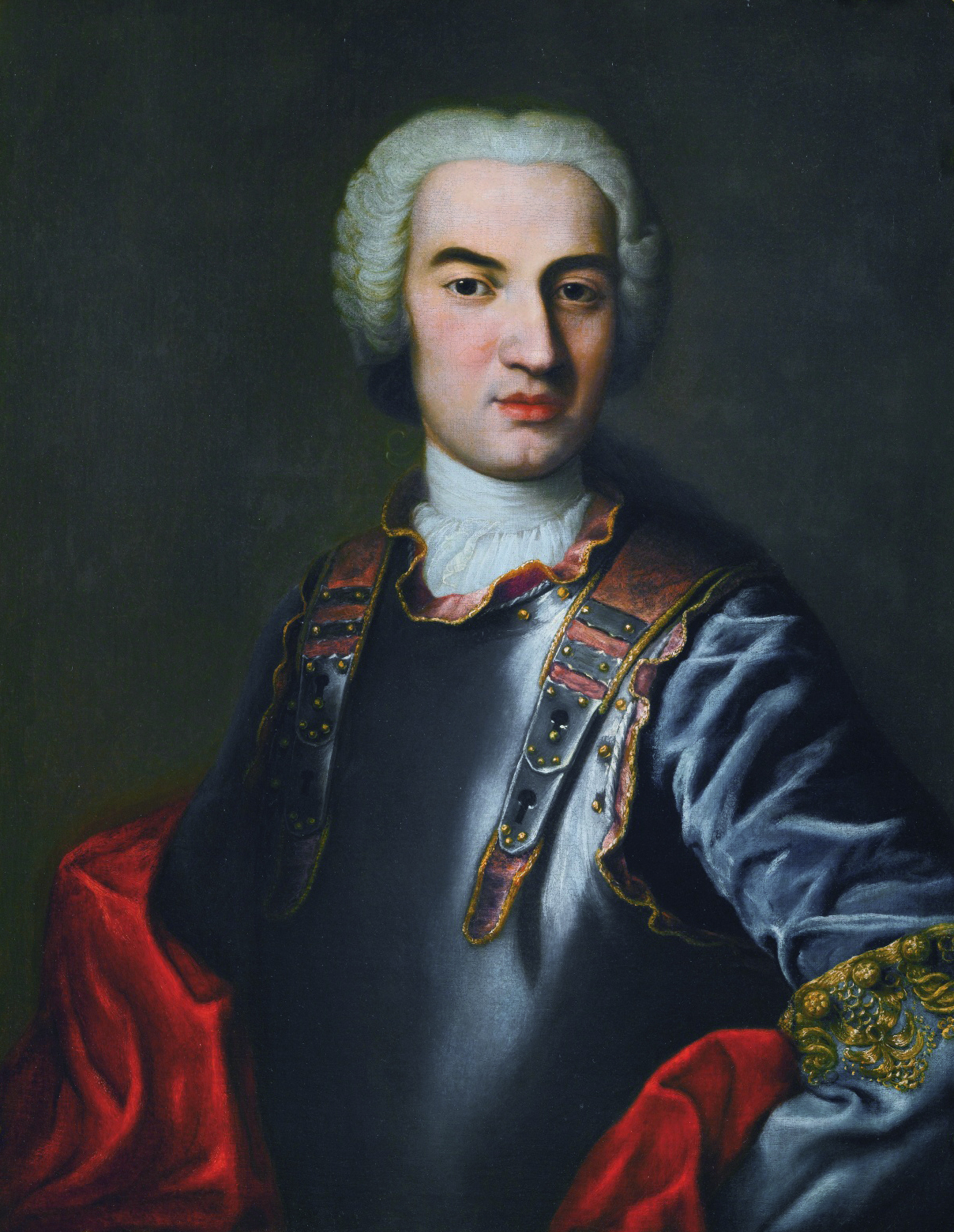
Carl Christian Erdmann, duke of Württemberg-Oels (1716–1792) (circle of Jacopo Amigoni)

Karl Christian Erdmann of Württemberg-Oels (26 October 1716 in Wilhelminenort near Bernstadt – 14 December 1792 in Oels) was ruling duke of Württemberg-Oels and Bernstadt.

== Early life ==
He was the only son of Christian Ulrich II, Duke of Württemberg-Wilhelminenort and his wife, Countess Philippine Charlotte of Redern-Krappitz (1691–1758).

In 1755 he was one of fourteen noblemen that founded the Order of Saint Joachim.

== Marriage and issue ==
He married, in 1741, Countess Marie Sophie Wilhelmine of Solms-Laubach (1721–1793), daughter of Count Friedrich Ernst of Solms-Laubach (1671–1723) and his wife, Fredericka Charlotte of Stolberg-Gedern (1686–1739). They had two children:

- Friederike Sophie Charlotte Auguste (1 August 1751 – 4 November 1789), who married Frederick Augustus, Prince of Brunswick-Wolfenbüttel-Oels.
- Friedrich Christian Karl (1757–1759), died in infancy.

Charles Christian Erdmann, Duke of Württemberg-Oels House of Württemberg Born: 26 October 1716 Died: 14 December 1792
Preceded by Charles Frederick II	Duke of Oels; 1744-1792	Succeeded by Frederick Augustus
Preceded by Charles	Duke of Bernstadt; 1745-1792	Succeeded by Frederick Augustus
