= Ludwig III of Württemberg =

German noble

Ludwig III (1166–1241) was Count of Württemberg. He was probably married to a daughter of Count Adalbert III von Dillenburg, whose name is unknown. Ludwig III and Hartmann were both known as 'Count of Württemberg' in documents of King Otto IV in his Rhineland, Swabian and Franconian palaces at the same time, so it seems they co-managed the county, with one staying at home and the other accompanying the emperor on his travels in Germany and Italy. In 1194 Ludwig took part in the conquest of Sicily by emperor Henry VI and Hartmann accompanied Otto IV to his coronation in Rome on 4 October 1209.
