= Duchy of Bernstadt =

Silesian duchy (1412–1745)

Coordinates: 51°07′40″N 17°32′20″E

Duchy of Bernstadt Herzogtum Bernstadt (de) Księstwo bierutowskie (pl) Bernštatské knížectví (cs)
- 1412–1745
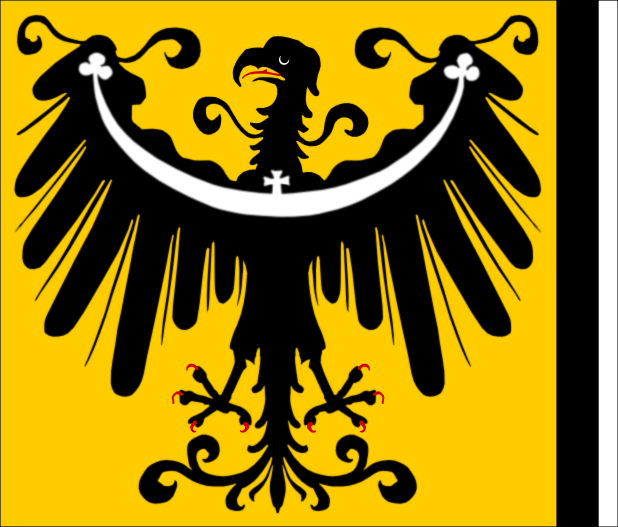
- Flag Coat of arms
- Status: Silesian duchy Fief of the Bohemian Crown (until 1742)
- Capital: Bernstadt (Bierutów)
- Historical era: Late Middle Ages; Early modern period
  - Split off Oels: 1412
  - Again ruled from Oels: 1447
  - Enfeoffed to Henry of Poděbrady: 1495
  - Silvius Nimrod of Württemberg Duke: 1648
  - Incorporated by Prussia: 1742
  - Re-united with Oels: 1745
Preceded by	Succeeded by
Duchy of Oels	Duchy of Oels
- Today part of: Poland

The Duchy of Bernstadt (German: Herzogtum Bernstadt, Polish: Księstwo bierutowskie, Czech: Bernštatské knížectví) was a Silesian duchy centred on the city of Bernstadt (Bierutów) in Lower Silesia (now in Poland) and formed by separation from the Duchy of Oels (Oleśnica). It was first ruled by the Silesian Piasts dynasty, until its extinction in 1492. In 1495 it and the Duchy of Oels passed to the Dukes of Münsterberg, who came from the House of Poděbrady. In 1647 the Duchy of Bernstadt passed by marriage to the Dukes of Württemberg.

== History ==
That the Duchy of Bernstadt at first belonged to the Silesian Duchy of Oels which had since 1329 been a fief of the Bohemian Crown. Upon the death of Duke Konrad III the Old in 1412, it was split off for his first-born son Conrad IV the Elder, who at first also ruled over the other Oels territories as a regent for his minor brothers until they formally divided their heritage in 1416. The next year, Konrad IV succeeded Wenceslaus II of Legnica as Prince-Bishop of Wrocław. When he died in 1447, Bernstadt fell back to his younger brother Duke Konrad VII the White of Oels.

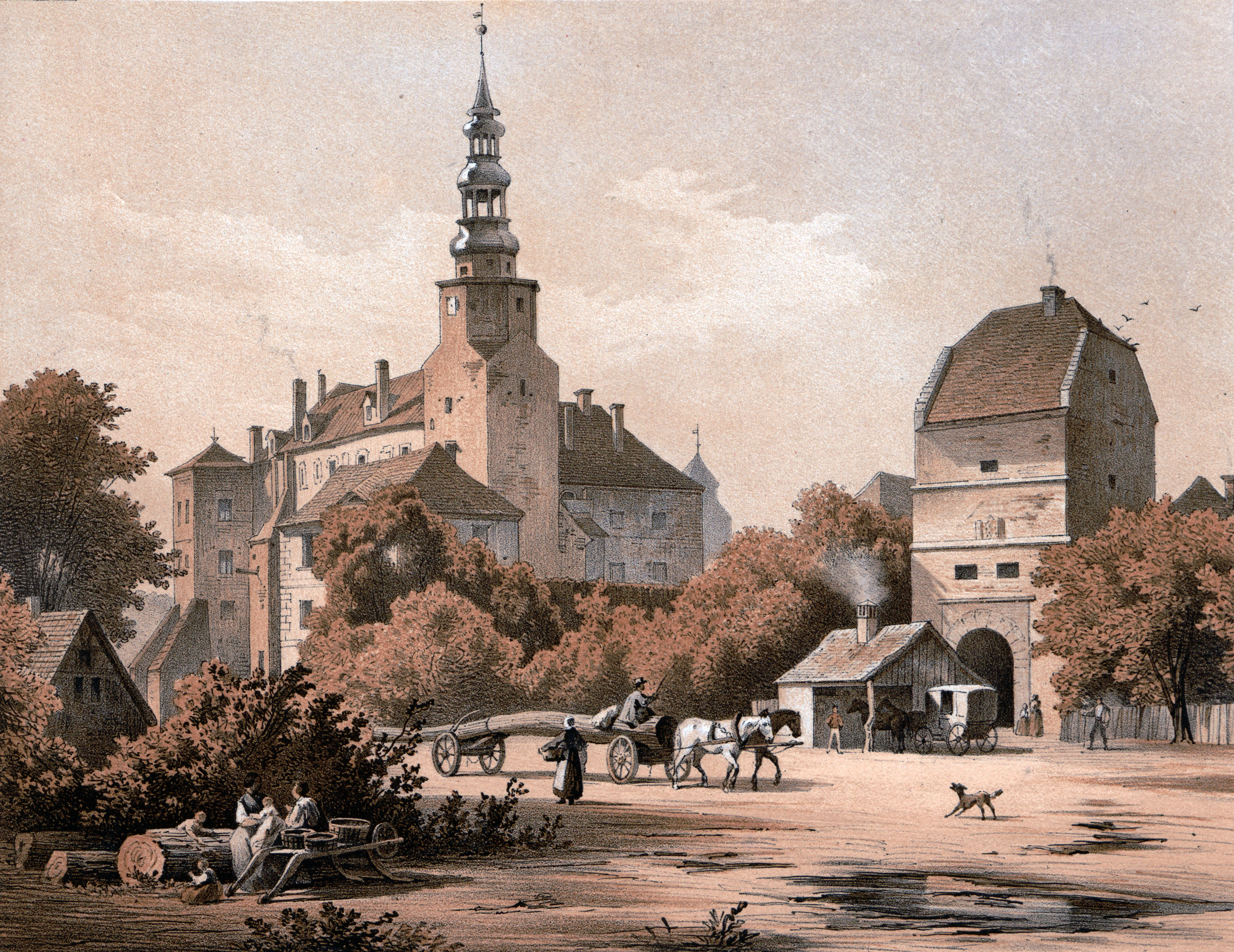
Bernstadt Castle, Alexander Duncker (1813–1879)

After the Oels branch of the Piast dynasty died out in 1492, the duchy was seized as a reverted fief by King Vladislaus II of Bohemia. In 1495, he gave the duchies of Bernstadt and Oels to Duke Henry the Elder of Münsterberg, a son of the late Bohemian king George of Poděbrady (d. 1471). Due to lack of money, his heir Duke Charles of Münsterberg and Oels leased Bernstadt in 1511 for four years to the City Council of Breslau (Wrocław), afterwards he chose it as his residence.

After Charles' death in 1536, his sons at first ruled jointly until in 1542 they divided their heritage: Duke Henry II received the Duchy of Bernstadt, while his younger brother John ruled the Duchy of Oels. Henry II was a supporter of the Protestant Reformation, which he introduced in Bernstadt. He had Bernstadt Castle restored during his reign, and expanded the south wing. His son Henry III, Duke of Bernstadt from 1565 sold Bernstadt along with the castle and some villages in 1574 to the von Schindel family.

Henry III's younger brother Duke Charles II of Münsterberg-Oels, who was Governor of Silesia at the time, bought it back in 1604. He was succeeded as Duke of Bernstadt by his son Henry Wenceslaus. When Henry Wenceslaus died in 1637, the duchy was inherited by his younger brother Duke Charles Frederick I of Münsterberg-Oels. The male line of the House of Poděbrady became extinct when Charles Frederick I died in 1647. The duchies of Bernstadt and Oels again reverted to the Bohemian Crown.

Because Charles Frederick's only daughter, Elizabeth Maria was married with Silvius I Nimrod, cousin of Duke Eberhard III of Württemberg, Emperor Ferdinand III granted Bernstadt and Oels to the Swabian House of Württemberg. Silvius, a devoted Lutheran, made great efforts to redevelop his estates, that had been devastated during the Thirty Years' War. The poet Angelus Silesius worked as his physician until 1652. When Silvius died in 1664, his duchies at first were ruled by his widow as regent for her minor sons, who in 1672 divided the inheritance. The Duchy of Bernstadt fell to Christian Ulrich I, who rebuilt the city after a fire in 1659 and added a third floor to the castle. Upon the death of his elder brother Duke Silvius II Frederick in 1697, he took over the Duchy of Oels. His nephew Charles was the last Duke of Bernstadt. He died childless in 1745 and the Duchy fell back to Duke Charles Christian Erdmann of Württemberg-Oels, who finally re-united the duchies of Bernstadt and Oels under his rule.

In 1742, during the First Silesian War, the Duchy of Bernstadt, like most of Silesia, had been conquered by Prussia.

Silesian Piast eagle

== Dukes ==
=== Silesian Piasts ===
- Conrad IV of Oels (1412–1447), Bishop of Breslau from 1417
  - Konrad VII the White (1447–1450), brother, Duke of Oels since 1412
- Konrad IX the Black (1450–1471), nephew, Duke of Oels
  - Konrad X the White (1471–1492), brother, Duke of Oels

Line extinct, duchy seized by Bohemia.

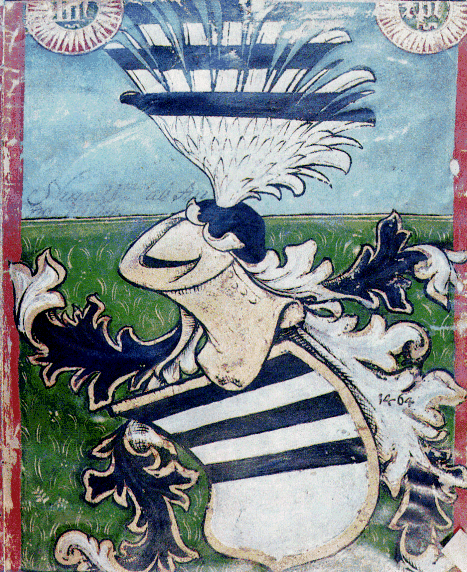
Coat of arms of the House of Kunštát

=== Podiebrad family ===
- Henry the Elder (1495–1498), Duke of Münsterberg since 1462
- Charles (1498–1536), son, Duke of Münsterberg and Oels
- Henry II (1536–1548), son, Duke of Münsterberg and Oels until 1542
- Henry III (1548–1587), son
  - John (1548–1565), his uncle, Duke of Münsterberg and Oels, as regent

Duchy sold in 1574 re-acquired by the Podiebrad family in 1604.

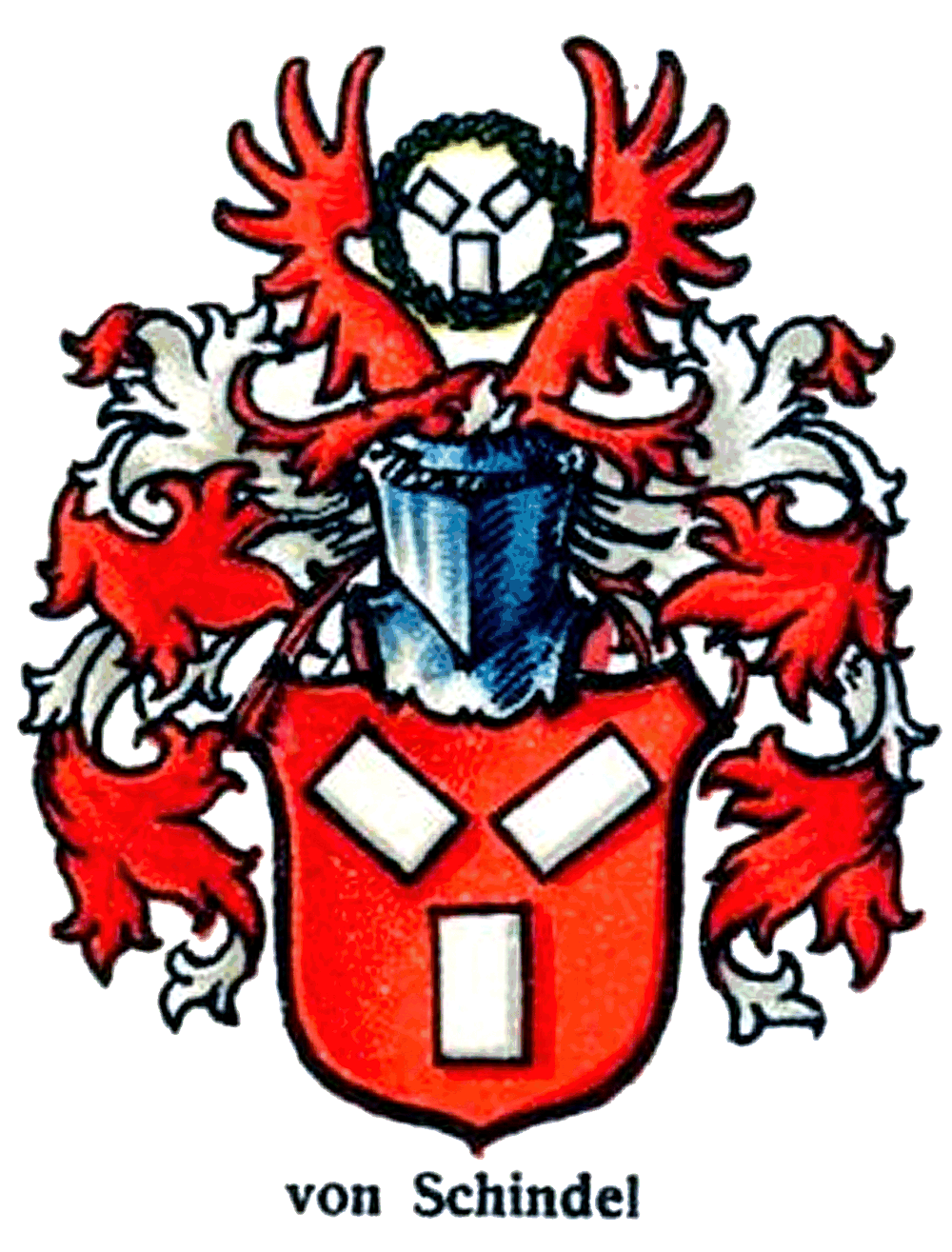
Coat of arms of the House of Schindel

=== The House of Schindel ===
- Heinrich von Schindel, Duke of Bernstadt since 1574
- Catherine von Schindel, Duchess of Bernstadt since 1576
- Jonas von Schindel, last member of the von Schindel family to be styled Duke of Bernstadt (until 1603)
- Leonhard von Schniedel, son of Jonas, who in 1604 sold it back to Podiebrad family

=== Podiebrad family ===
- Charles II (1604–1617), brother of Henry III, Duke of Oels since 1565
- Henry Wenceslaus (1617–1639), son
  - Charles Frederick (1639–1647), brother, Duke of Oels since 1617

Bernstadt and Oels extinct, again seized by Bohemia.

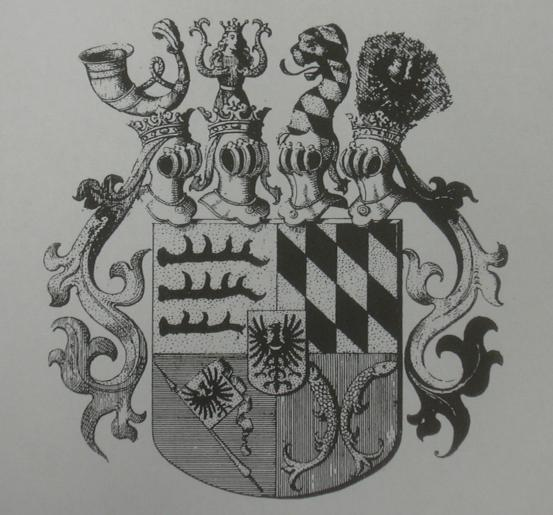
Coat of arms of the House of Württemberg-Oels, Siebmachers Wappenbuch, 1856

=== House of Württemberg ===
- Silvius I Nimrod (1648–1664), son-in-law of Charles Frederick
  - Christian, Duke of Brieg, 1664–1669, regent
- Christian Ulrich I (1669–1697), son of Silvius Nimrod, Duke of Oels from 1697
- Charles (1697–1745), nephew

Bernstadt line extinct, fell back to Oels.

== References and sources ==
- Hugo Weczerka (ed.): Handbuch der historischen Stätten: Schlesien, Kröner, Stuttgart, 1977, ISBN 3-520-31601-3, p. 18–20 and genealogical tables on p. 594–552 and 602–603.
- Rudolf Žáček: Dějiny Slezska v datech, Nakladatelství Libri, Prague, 2004, ISBN 80-7277-172-8, pp. 169, 410, 434–436.
