= Silvius I Nimrod of Württemberg-Oels =

Silvius I Nimrod, Duke of Württemberg-Oels
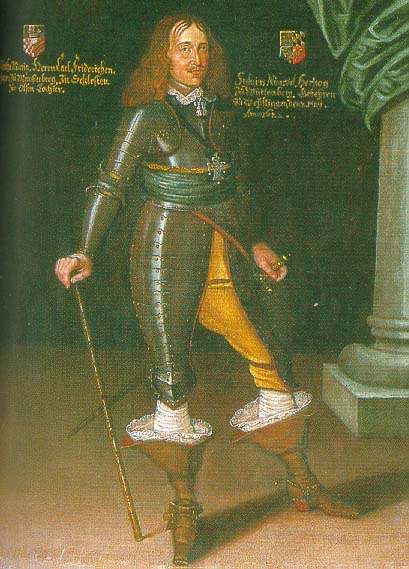
- Anonymous portrait (17th century)
- Born: 2 May 1622; Weiltingen
- Died: 24 April 1664 (aged 41); Brzezinka
- Spouse: Elisabeth Marie, Duchess of Oels
- House: House of Württemberg
- Father: Julius Frederick, Duke of Württemberg-Weiltingen
- Mother: Anna Sabina of Schleswig-Holstein-Sonderburg

Silvius I Nimrod, Duke of Württemberg-Oels (2 May 1622, Weiltingen – 24 April 1664, Brzezinka in Silesia) was the first Duke of Oels-Württemberg.

== Life ==
Silvius was the son of Duke Julius Frederick of Württemberg-Weiltingen and Anna Sabina of Schleswig-Holstein-Sonderburg.

In 1638, he participated in the army of Bernhard of Saxe-Weimar besieging Breisach.

On 1 May 1647, he married in Oels Elisabeth Marie, Duchess of Oels, whose father, Duke Charles Frederick I died a few weeks later. Since Charles Frederick was the last reigning Duke of Oels, the Duchy fell to the Crown of Bohemia as a vacant fief. Emperor Ferdinand III, in his capacity as King of Bohemia, inherited the Duchy. After lengthy negotiations, Silvius Nimrod was invested on 15 December 1648 in Vienna with the Duchy of Oels, in exchange for 20000guilders and the Moravian Lordship of Jevišovice. Silvius Nimrod then began rebuilding the Duchy, which had suffered during the Thirty Years' War. He focused on education and the Church. In 1652, he founded the Order of the Skull, which existed until the 19th century.

Angelus Silesius was his court physician from 1647 to 1652. Matthäus Apelt was until 1639 his ducal councillor and court music director.

Silvius Nimrod died of a stroke on 26 April 1664, during a visit to Brzezinka. In accordance with his last will and testament, Duke Christian of Liegnitz-Brieg took up the guardianship of Silvius Nimrod's underage children. To prevent an imperial guardianship, which would probably imply a Catholic education, Christian sent the young princes to Tübingen, where they studied at the Collegium illustre.

== Marriage and issue ==
Silvius married on 1 May 1647 in Oels Elisabeth Marie, Duchess of Oels (1625–1686). The couple had five sons and two daughters:

- Anna Sophia (1648–1661)
- Karl Ferdinand (1650–1669)
- Silvius II Frederick (1651–1697)
- Christian Ulrich I (1652–1704)
- Julius Siegmund (1653–1684)
- Kunigunde Juliana (1655–1655)
- Sylvius (1660–1660)
