= Weiltingen =

- Municipality
- Coat of arms

- Location of Weiltingen within Ansbach district
- Interactive map of Weiltingen
- Location within Germany Location within Bavaria
- Coordinates: 49°01′N 10°28′E
- Country: Germany
- State: Bavaria
- Admin. region: Mittelfranken
- District: Ansbach
- Municipal assoc.: Wilburgstetten
- Subdivisions: 8 Ortsteile

Government
  - Mayor (2020–26): Christoph Schmidt

Area
  - Total: 24.02 km^{2} (9.27 sq mi)
- Elevation: 440 m (1,440 ft)

Population (2025-12-31)
  - Total: 1,393
  - Density: 57.99/km^{2} (150.2/sq mi)
- Time zone: UTC+01:00 (CET)
  - Summer (DST): UTC+02:00 (CEST)
- Postal codes: 91744
- Dialling codes: 09853
- Vehicle registration: AN
- Website: www.weiltingen.de

Weiltingen (German pronunciation: [ˈvaɪltɪŋən]; East Franconian: Wailting) is a municipality in the district of Ansbach in Bavaria in Germany.

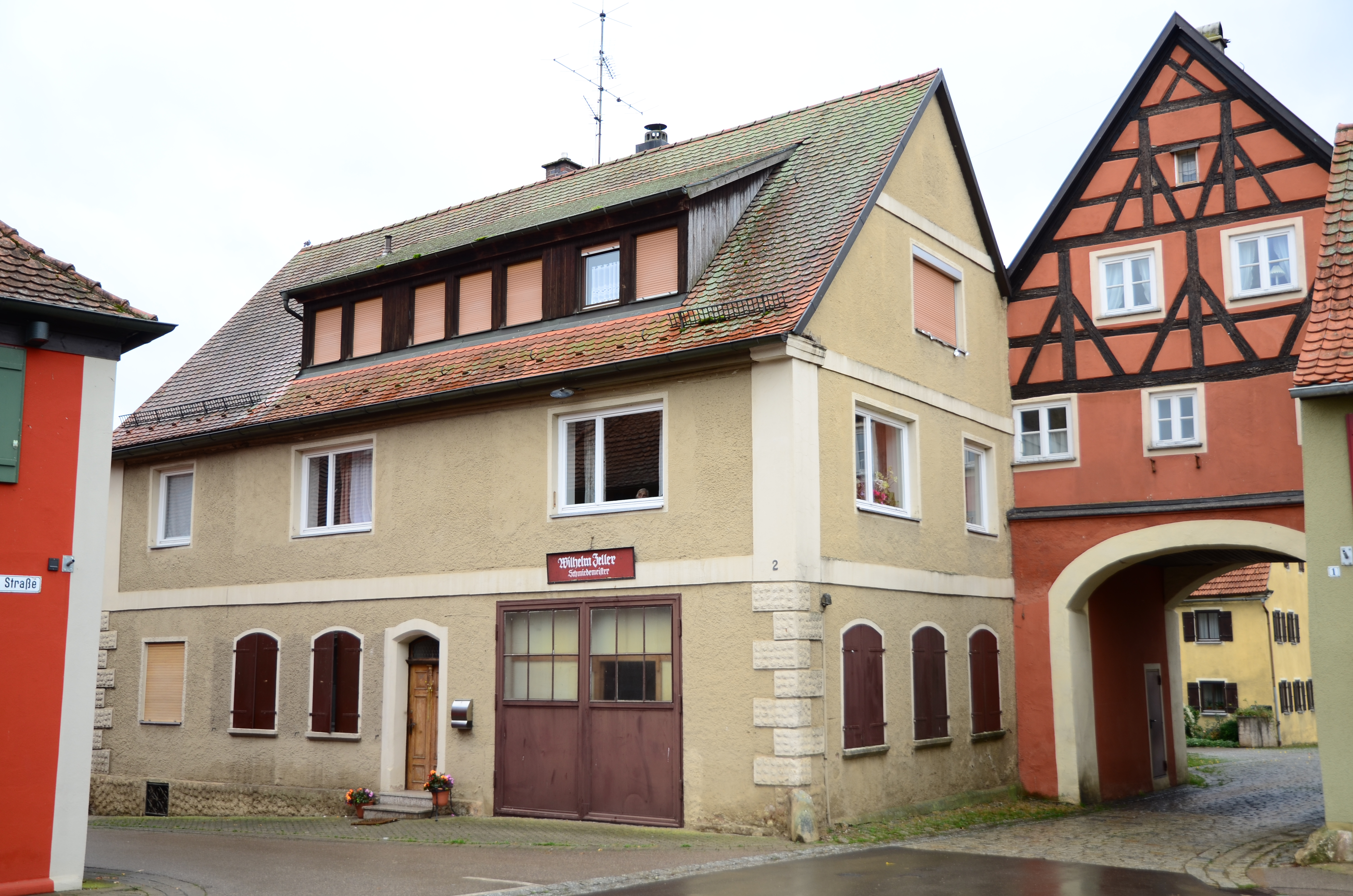
Weiltingen Market place

== Population development ==
- 1991: 1285
- 1995: 1317
- 2000: 1406
- 2005: 1371
- 2010: 1385
- 2015: 1343
- 2016: 1381
- 2018: 1418
