= Brzozowiec, Opole Voivodeship =

Brzozowiec
- Village
- Location within Poland
- Coordinates: 51°0′N 17°34′E
- Country: Poland
- Voivodeship: Opole
- County: Namysłów
- Gmina: Namysłów

Brzozowiec [bʐɔˈzɔvjɛt͡s] (German Wilhelminenort) is a village in the administrative district of Gmina Namysłów, within Namysłów County, Opole Voivodeship, in south-western Poland.
