= Międzybórz =

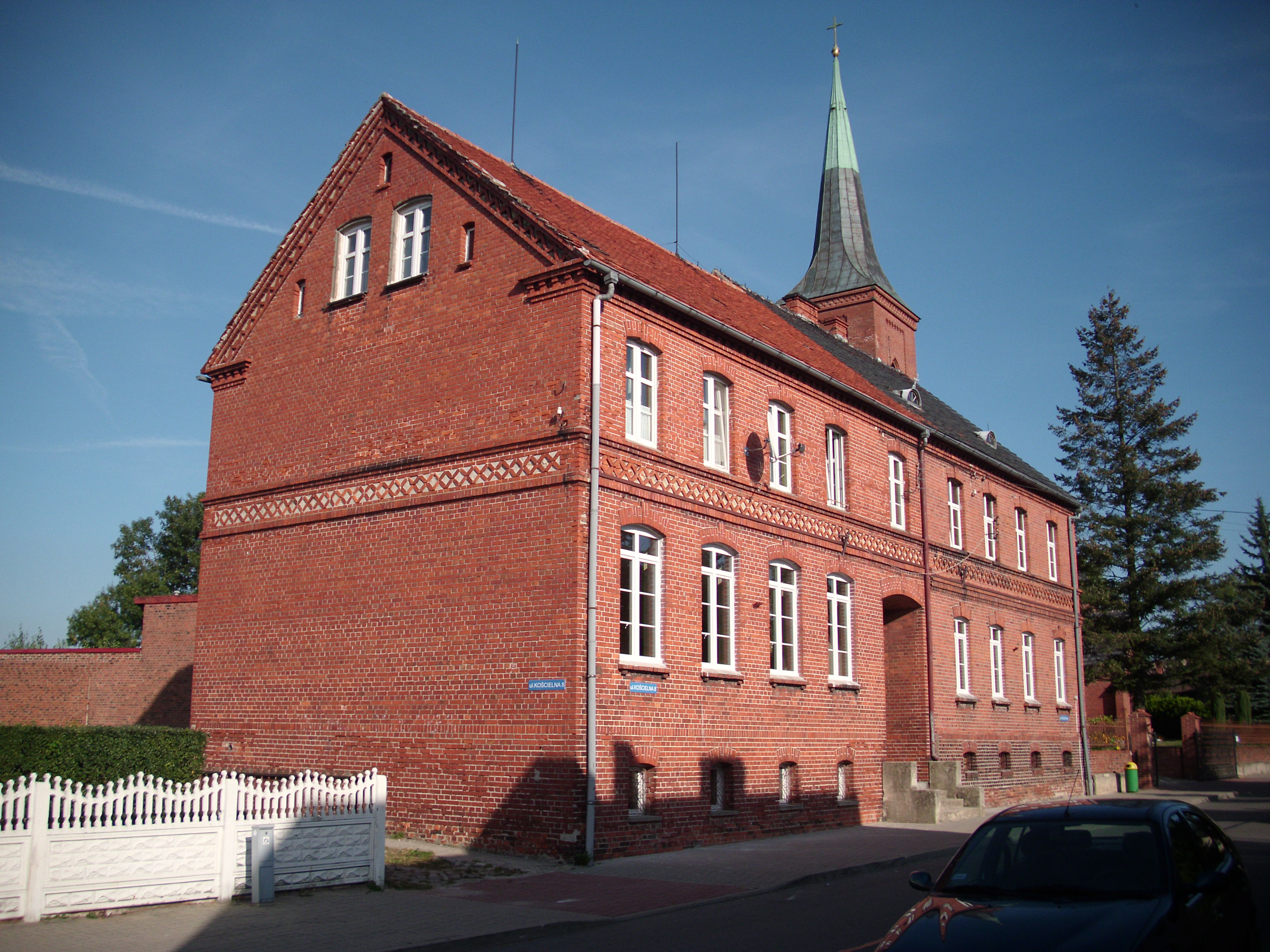
- Holy Cross Church and clergy house

- Coat of arms

- Location within Poland
- Coordinates: 51°23′57″N 17°39′56″E
- Country: Poland
- Voivodeship: Lower Silesian
- County: Oleśnica
- Gmina: Międzybórz

Area
  - Total: 6.41 km^{2} (2.47 sq mi)

Population (2019-06-30)
  - Total: 2,341
  - Density: 365/km^{2} (946/sq mi)
- Time zone: UTC+1 (CET)
  - Summer (DST): UTC+2 (CEST)
- Postal code: 56-513
- Vehicle registration: DOL
- Website: miedzyborz.pl

Międzybórz [mʲɛnˈd͡zɨbuʂ], also known as Międzybórz Sycowski (German: Neumittelwalde, until 1886 Medzibor), is a town in Oleśnica County, Lower Silesian Voivodeship, in southern Poland. It is the seat of the administrative district (gmina) called Gmina Międzybórz.

== Etymology ==
The town's name is of Polish origin, meaning "między borami", that is "between forests".

== History ==
The settlement was first mentioned in 1228, when it was part of fragmented Poland. From 1313 it was part of the Duchy of Oleśnica, remaining ruled by the Piast dynasty until 1492. It received town privileges in 1637. Since the 19th century it has been a centre of the Polish Protestant faith.

== Gallery ==
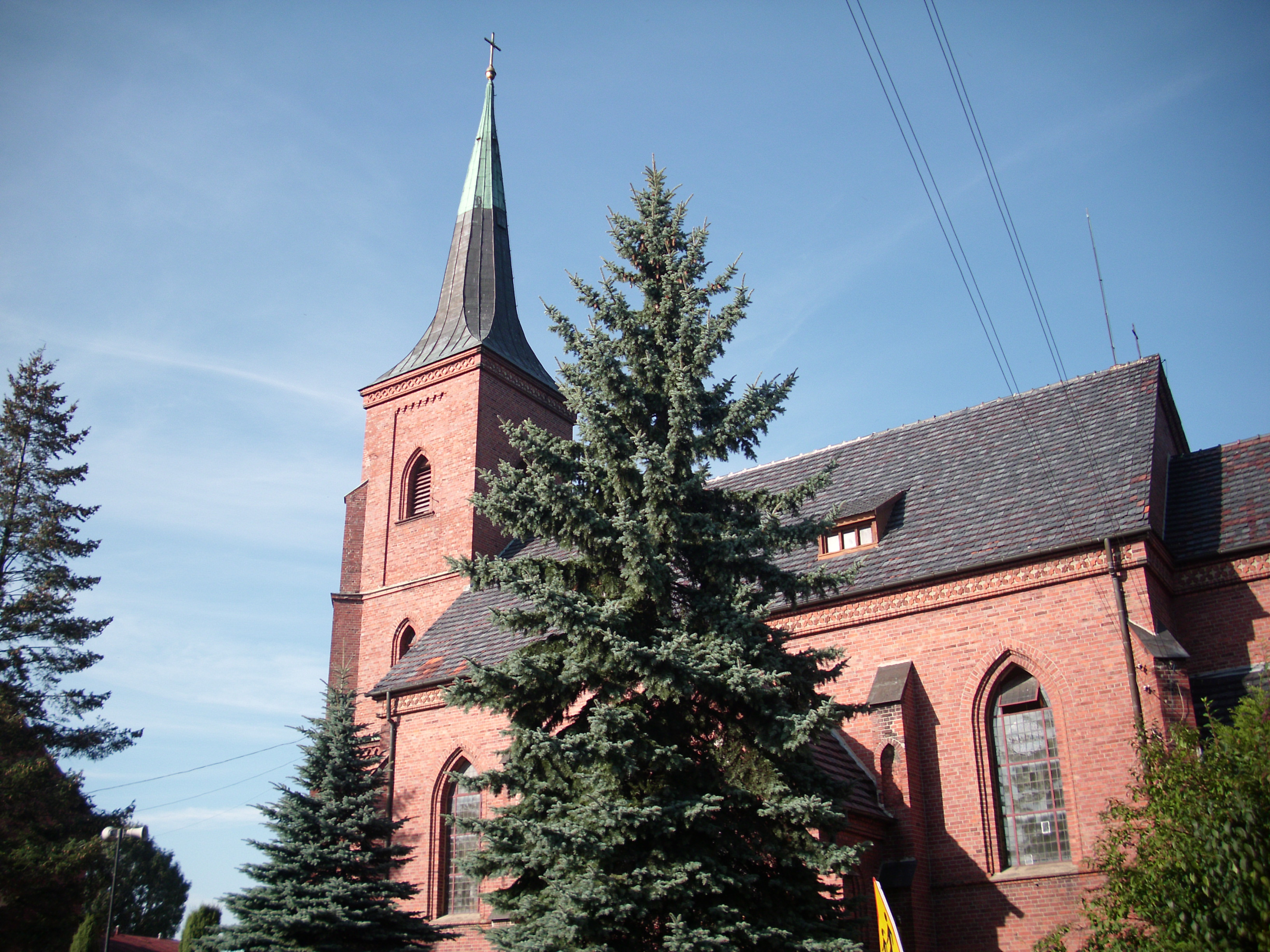
Saint Joseph church

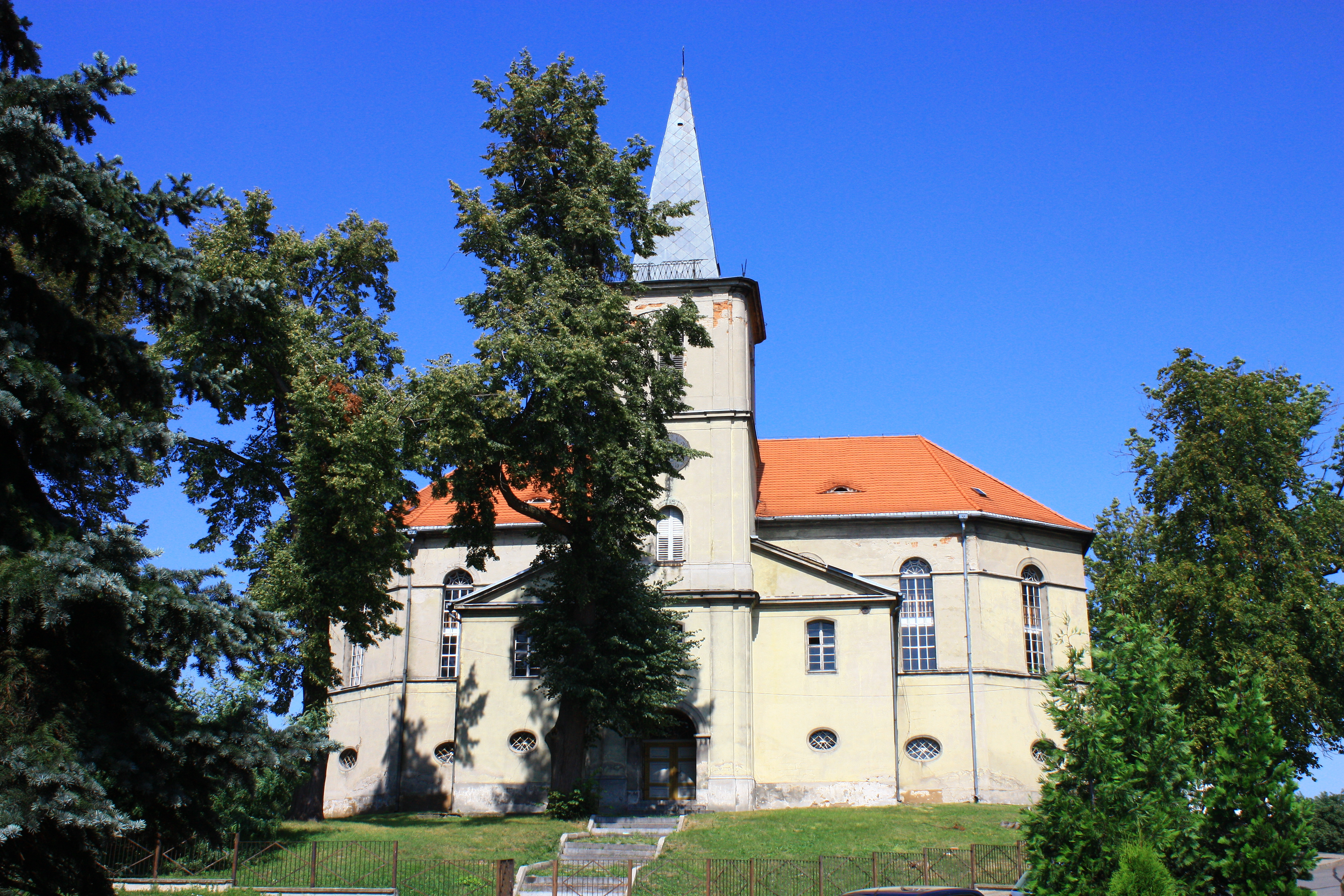
Holy Cross church

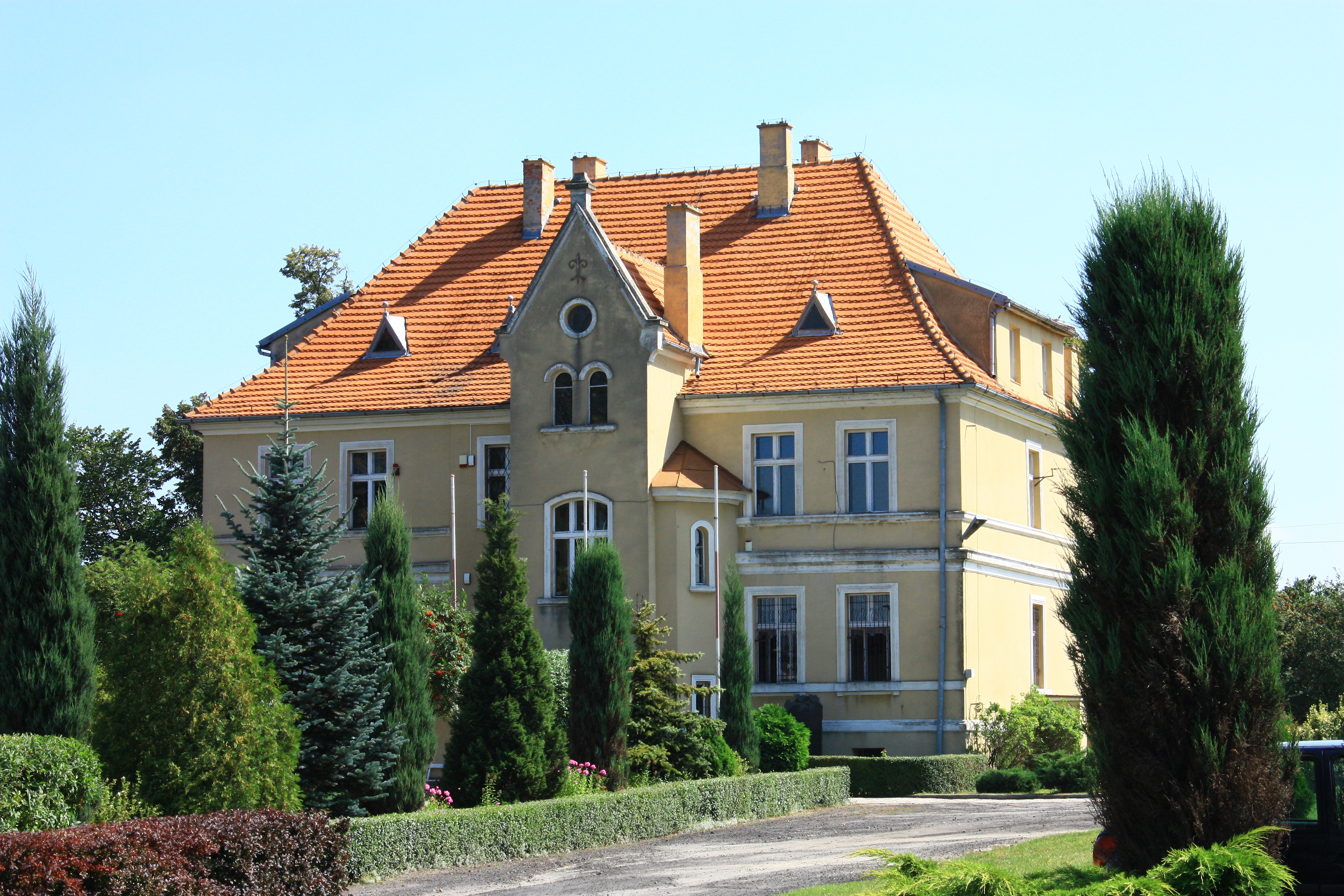
Old manor house
