= Dobroszyce =

- Village
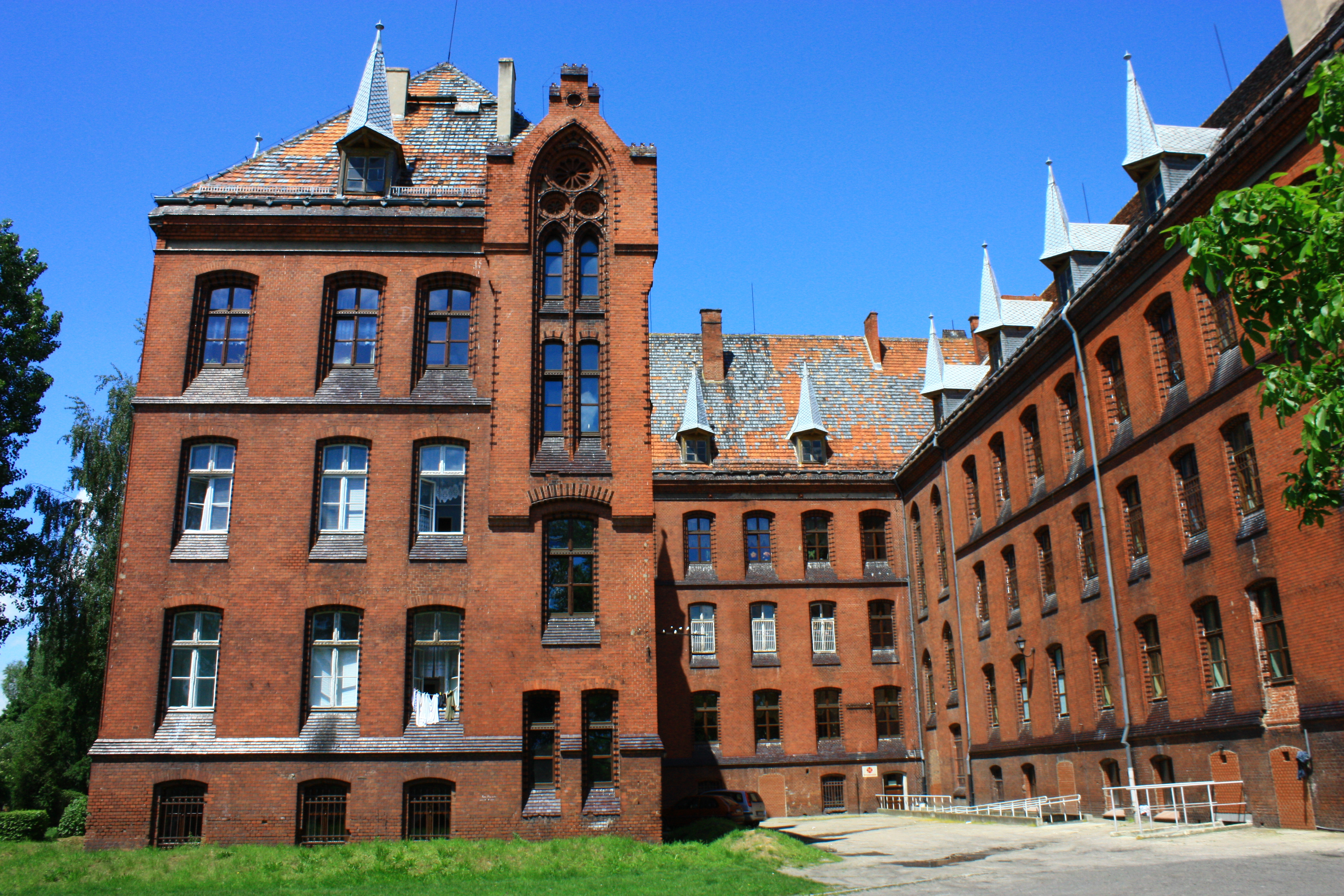
- Orphanage

- Location within Poland
- Coordinates: 51°15′53″N 17°20′21″E
- Country: Poland
- Voivodeship: Lower Silesian
- County: Oleśnica
- Gmina: Dobroszyce

Population
  - Total: 2,376
- Time zone: UTC+1 (CET)
  - Summer (DST): UTC+2 (CEST)
- Vehicle registration: DOL

Dobroszyce ([dɔbrɔˈʂɨt͡sɛ]) (German: Juliusburg) is a village in Oleśnica County, Lower Silesian Voivodeship, in south-western Poland. It is the seat of the administrative district (gmina) called Gmina Dobroszyce.

== History ==
Between 1663 and 1928 the town had town rights.

During World War II, from 1940 to 1942, the German administration operated the Oflag VIII-C prisoner-of-war camp for French, Belgian and Dutch officers and orderlies in the village. Some Dutch POWs managed to escape from the camp.

== Transport ==
There is a railway station in Dobroszyce.

== Sports ==
The local football club is Dąb Dobroszyce. It competes in the lower leagues.
