= Duchy of Oels =

Silesian duchy (1313–1884)

Coordinates: 51°12′42″N 17°23′25″E

Duchy of Oleśnica Księstwo Oleśnickie (Polish) Herzogtum Oels (German) Olešnické knížectví (Czech)
- 1313–1884
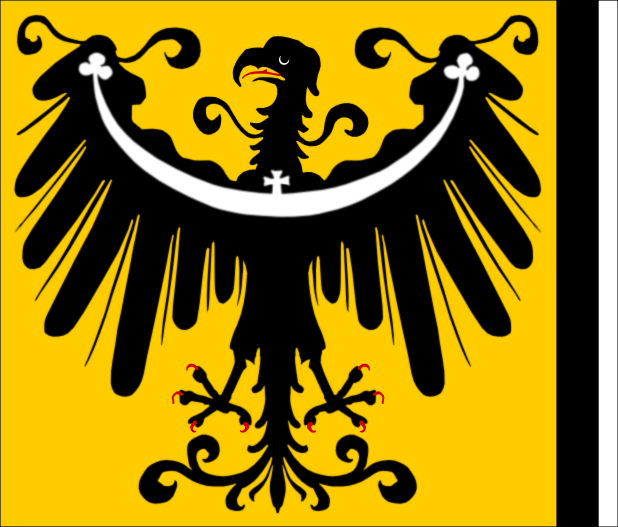
- Flag Coat of arms

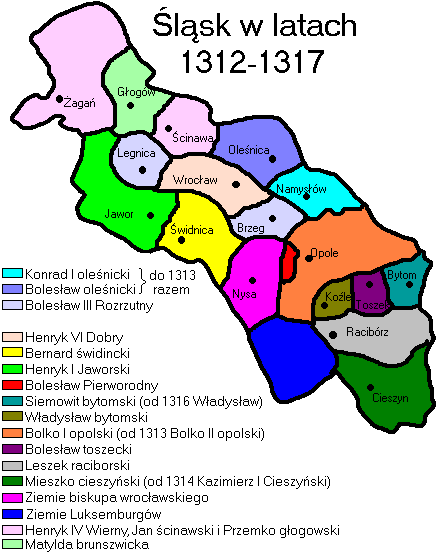
- Silesia 1312-1317: Creation of the Duchy of Olésnica (blue, north) for Bolesław in 1313
- Status: District duchy of Poland; Silesian duchy Fief of the Bohemian Crown (1329–1480, 1490–1742); Fief of Hungary (1480–1490); Part of Prussia (from 1742)
- Capital: Oleśnica
- Historical era: Middle Ages; Early modern period
  - Partitioned from Głogów: 1313
  - Vassalized by Bohemia: 1329
  - Bierutów split off: 1412
  - Vassal of Hungary: 1480
  - Vassal of Bohemia: 1490
  - Henry of Poděbrady duke: 1495
  - Silvius Nimrod of Württemberg duke: 1649
  - Frederick Augustus of Brunswick duke: 1792
  - Disestablishment: 1884
Preceded by	Succeeded by
Duchy of Głogów / Duchy of Głogów	Kingdom of Prussia / Kingdom of Prussia
- Today part of: Poland

The Duchy of Oleśnica (Polish: Księstwo Oleśnickie, Latin: Ducatus Olsnensis) or Duchy of Oels (German: Herzogtum Oels) was one of the duchies of Silesia with its capital in Oleśnica in Lower Silesia, Poland. Initially ruled by the Silesian Piasts, it was acquired by the Münsterberg (Ziębice) dukes of the Podiebrad family from 1495 and was inherited by the House of Württemberg in 1649. Conquered by Prussia in 1742, it was enfeoffed to the Welf dukes of Brunswick-Lüneburg from 1792 until its dissolution in 1884.

== History ==
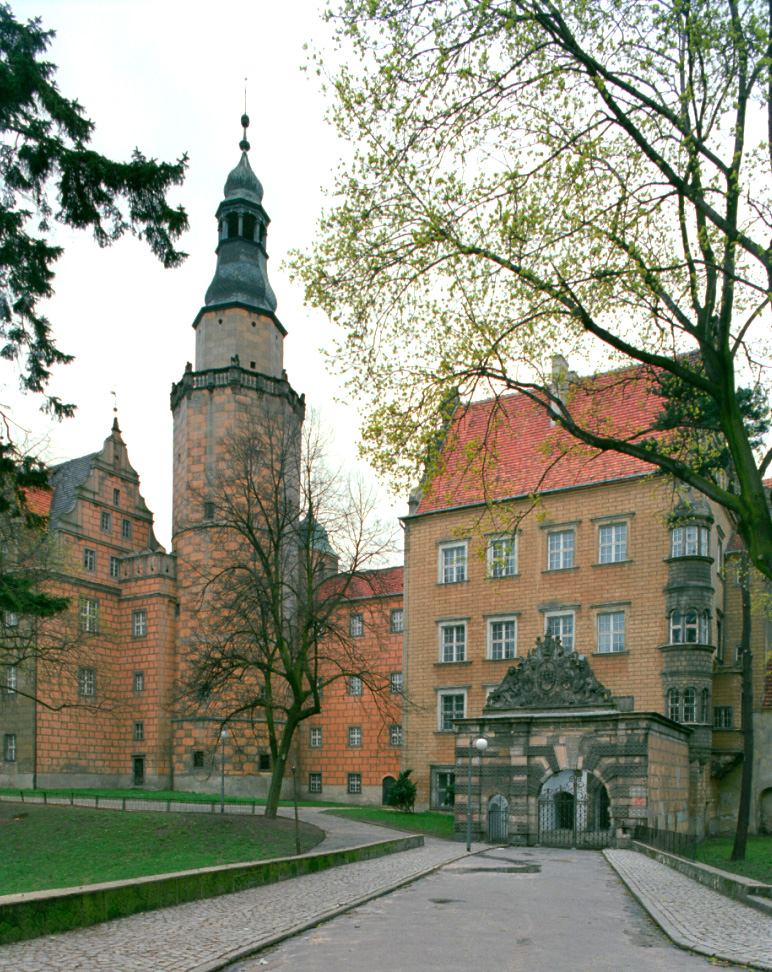
Oleśnica Castle

Initially part of the Piast Duchy of Silesia, the Oleśnica area became part of the Duchy of Głogów in 1294, following an armed conflict between Duke Henry III of Głogów and his cousin Henry V the Fat, Duke of Wrocław. After the death of Duke Henry III in 1309, it gained significant autonomy during the division of the Głogów lands and the creation of the Duchy of Oleśnica for Henry's son Bolesław in 1313, succeeded by his brother Konrad I in 1321. Dukes Bolesław and Konrad I still claimed to be heirs of the entire Kingdom of Poland, even though they ruled only in their duchy, which caused animosity from other Polish dukes in Silesia and monarch of all Poland Władysław I Łokietek.

Konrad sought protection from the inheritance claims raised by his Piast cousins and King Władysław I the Elbow-high of Poland at the Bohemian crown and in 1329 swore allegiance to the Luxembourg king John of Bohemia. Falling under Bohemian suzerainty hindered the growth of Oleśnica, as the important trade route linking Wrocław via Oleśnica with Kalisz and Toruń was severed. On good terms with King John and his son Emperor Charles IV, Duke Konrad I was able to acquire the Koźle area upon the death of Duke Bolesław of Bytom in 1355. His son Duke Konrad II the Gray further purchased the town of Kąty and half of the Duchy of Ścinawa from Duke Henry VIII the Sparrow. He bequested considerable possessions to his successor Konrad III the Old in 1403.

Oleśnica remained a Bohemian fief, which from 1413 was ruled by the sons of Duke Konrad III. While Konrad IV the Elder acquired the title of a Duke of Bernstadt (Bierutów) and became Bishop of Wrocław in 1417, while his younger brothers Konrad V Kantner and Konrad VII the White in 1437 reached their renewed enfeoffment by Emperor Sigismund. During the Hussite Wars, the duchy was invaded by the Hussites in 1432, and later Polish–Hussite negotiations took place in Oleśnica. The sons of Konrad V, Konrad IX the Black and Konrad X the White assumed the rule in 1450 and again paid homage to the Bohemian king George of Poděbrady. During the Bohemian–Hungarian War local dukes switched sides several times. In 1469 they recognized the overlordship of King Matthias Corvinus of Hungary, in the 1470s Duke Konrad X sided with Bohemian King Vladislaus Jagiellon, in 1480 he recognized Hungarian suzerainty again, and then revolted in 1489.

After the local branch of the Silesian Piasts had died out with the death of Duke Konrad X in 1492, the duchy was supposed to pass to future Polish King John I Albert in accordance with an agreement from 1491, but it Duke Henry of Münsterberg, son of the predeceased Bohemian King George of Poděbrady, also claimed the ceased fief for him and his descendants. His claims were finally acknowledged by George's successor King Vladislav II Jagiellon in 1495, after the state countries Syców (Groß Wartenberg), Żmigród (Trachenberg), and Milicz (Militsch) had been split off.

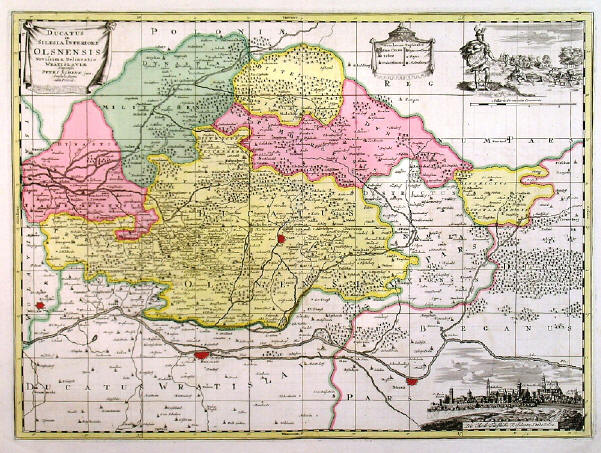
Ducatus in Silesia Inferiore Olsnensis, engraving by Pieter Schenk the Younger, about 1720

When the Poděbrad dynasty became extinct in 1647, the Habsburg emperor Ferdinand III, King of Bohemia, enfeoffed Silvius I Nimrod of Württemberg with Oleśnica, who had married the daughter of the last Podiěbrad duke. In the 17th century, Oleśnica remained an important center of Polish printing, and Polish religious writers Adam Gdacius (nicknamed Rey of Silesia) and Jerzy Bock published their works there. In the 18th century, one of two main routes connecting Warsaw and Dresden ran through the duchy and Kings Augustus II the Strong and Augustus III of Poland often traveled that route. The duchy remained under the Crown of Bohemia until in 1742 it was conquered by the Kingdom of Prussia in the course of the Silesian Wars.

The Württemberg dukes remained landowners until in 1792 the duchy was inherited by Frederick Augustus of Brunswick-Lüneburg, son of Charles I, Duke of Brunswick-Wolfenbüttel. From 1815 Oleśnica was ruled in personal union with the Duchy of Brunswick until its dissolution after Duke William had died without issue in 1884.

== See also ==
- Dukes of Silesia
