= Antonia of Württemberg =

Princess and Hebrew scholar (1613–1679)

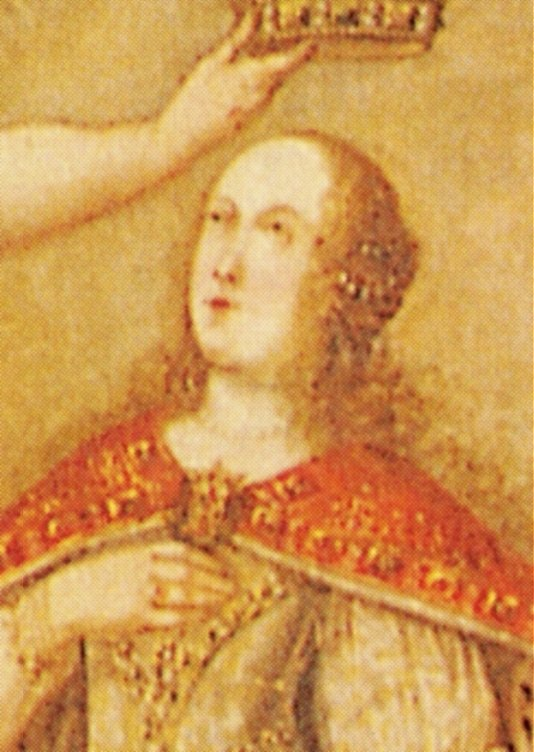
- Antonia of Württemberg
- Born: 24 March 1613; Stuttgart, Germany
- Died: 1 October 1679 (aged 66); Bad Liebenzell, Germany
- Noble family: House of Württemberg
- Father: John Frederick of Württemberg
- Mother: Barbara Sophie of Brandenburg

Antonia of Württemberg (24 March 1613 – 1 October 1679) was a princess of the Duchy of Württemberg, as well as a literary figure, patroness, and Christian Kabbalist.

== Life ==
Born in Stuttgart in 1613, Princess Antonia was the third of nine children from the marriage of Duke Johann Frederick of Württemberg and Barbara Sophie of Brandenburg, the daughter of the Elector Joachim Frederick of Brandenburg. Highly educated and generous, she was the sister of Duke Eberhard III of Württemberg, who more than his father played an important role in the Thirty Years War.

During the course of the war many churches in Württemberg were looted and became stripped of their ornaments, especially following the battle of Nördlingen in 1634. Antonia made it her mission to establish foundations to repair and restore the churches. Her charity, piety, gift for languages and all-encompassing scholarship were widely praised, and she became celebrated as "Princess Antonia the learned", and "the Minerva of Württemberg". Wherever possible she dedicated herself to the arts and sciences, together with her two sisters the princesses Anna Johanna and Sibylle.

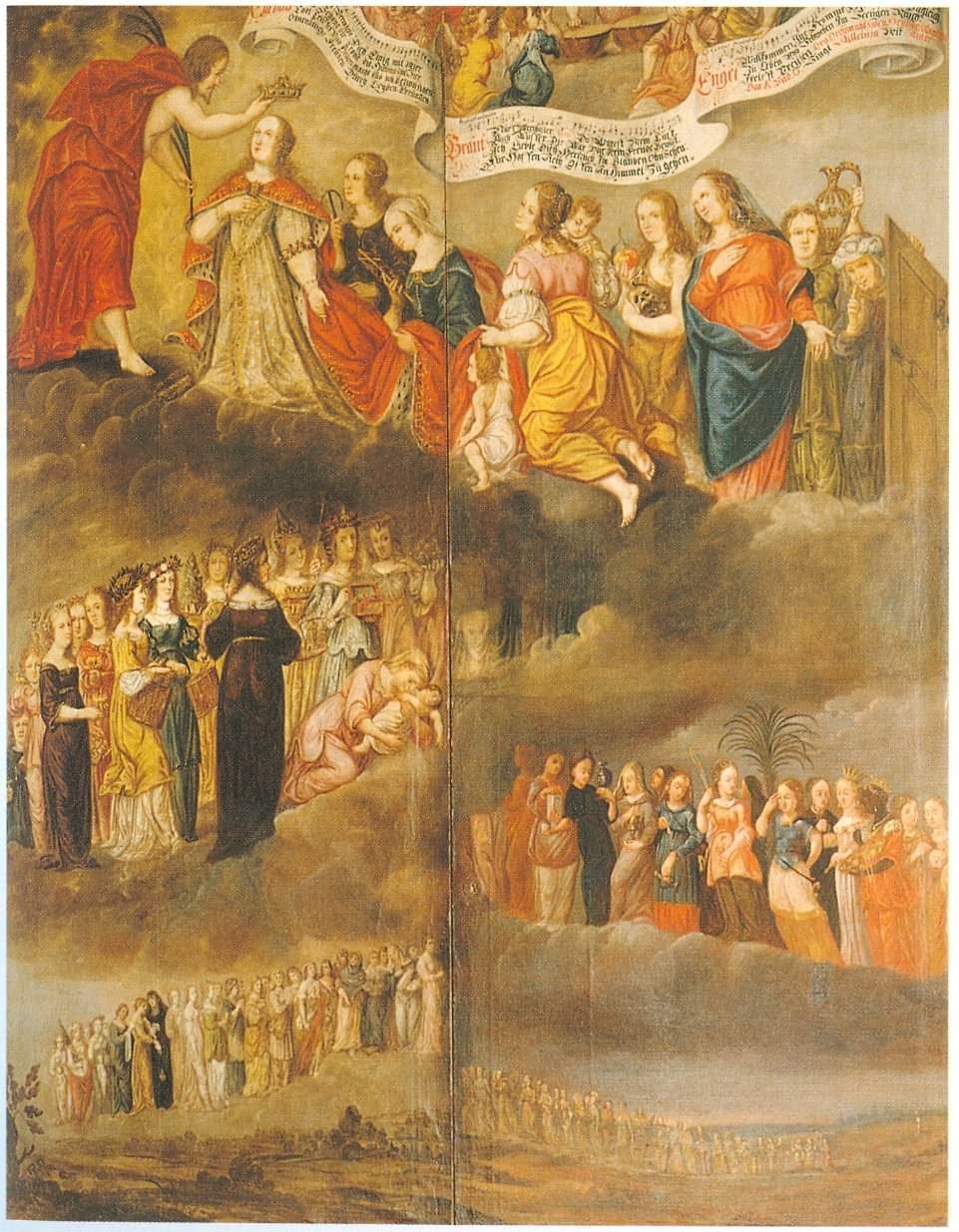
The triptych in its closed state. (Bridal procession of the Shulamite). The soul, identified with the Bride in the Song of Songs, climbs to Enlightenment and union with Christ, accompanied by allegorical figures led by Faith, Hope and Charity. The first three figures are portraits of Antonia (being crowned), and her two sisters Anna Johanna and Sybilla.

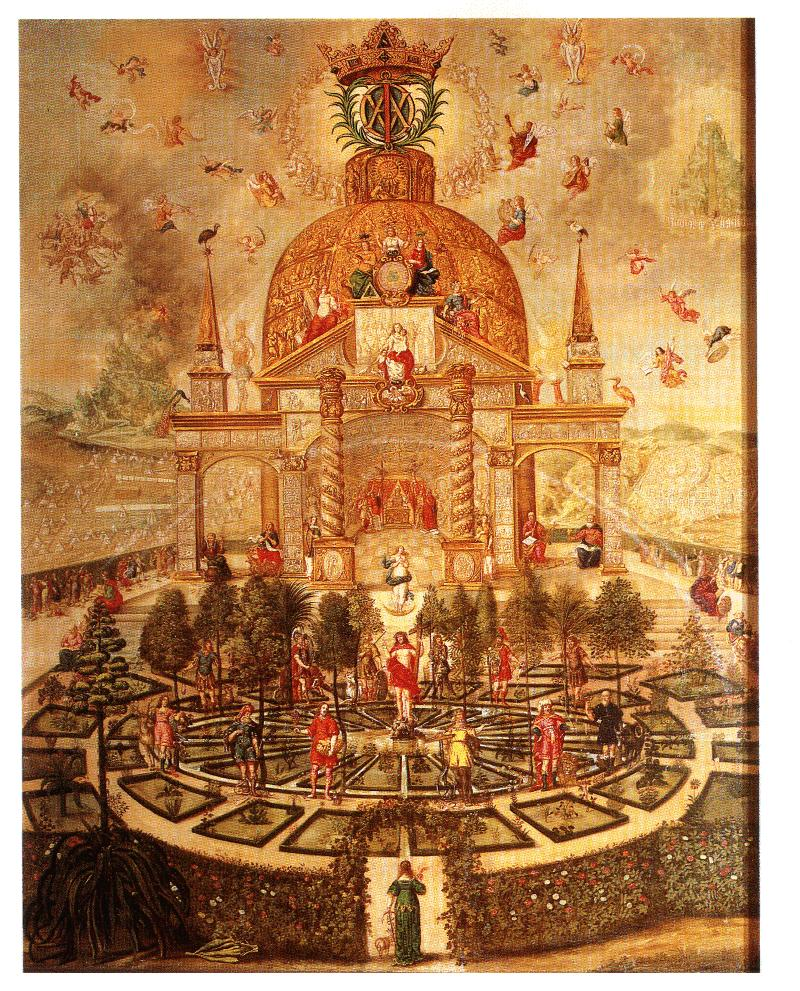
Central panel of the opened Kabbalistic Lehrtafel of Princess Antonia. The soul stands at the threshold of the garden of paradise, depicted in a dense web of esoteric symbolic imagery.

She became a close associate of the evangelical Protestant theologian and mystical symbolist Johann Valentin Andreae, and later was on friendly terms with the founder of the Pietism movement, Philip Jacob Spener. In addition to painting, her interests were above all in the realm of philosophy and languages, with a special preference for Hebrew, and the study of the Jewish Kabbalah. Her specifically Christian expression of this tradition found its culmination in the unique large Kabbalistic triptych painting designed and commissioned by Princess Antonia and her academic teachers in 1652, installed in 1673 in the small town church of Holy Trinity at Bad Teinach-Zavelstein in the Black Forest, a personal witness of faith.

Princess Antonia died in 1679, having never married. Her body was buried in the Collegiate Church in Stuttgart; but she directed that her heart should be buried in the wall of Trinity Church in Bad Teinach, behind her painting.

== Hebrew scholar ==
An increased interest in the Hebrew language among Christian scholars was one of the effects of the Reformation in Germany, and royal and noble families included it sometimes even in the curriculum of their daughters' education. In the seventeenth century many German women attained to quite a considerable knowledge of Hebrew. Antonia of Württemberg has become one of the best known. She acquired a remarkable mastery of Hebrew; and according to contemporary evidence was also well versed in rabbinic and Kabbalistic lore.

Esenwein, dean of Urach and later professor at Tübingen, wrote in July 1649 to Johannes Buxtorf at Basel that Antonia, "having been well grounded in the Hebrew language and in reading the Hebrew Bible, desires to learn also the art of reading without vowels," and three years later he wrote to Buxtorf that she had made such progress that she had "with her own hand put vowels to the greatest part of a Hebrew Bible".

Philipp Jacob Spener, another pupil of Buxtorf, during his temporary stay at Heidelberg, was on friendly terms with the princess, and they studied Kabbalah together. Buxtorf himself presented her with a copy of each of his books. There is a manuscript extant in the Royal Library of Stuttgart, entitled Unterschiedlicher Riss zu Sephiroth which is supposed to have been written by Antonia. It contains kabbalistic diagrams, some of which are interpreted in Hebrew and German. Her praise was sung by many a Christian Hebraist; one poem in twenty-four stanzas with her acrostic, in honour of the "celebrated Princess Antonia", has been preserved in Johannes Buxtorf's collection of manuscripts.

== The Kabbalistic Lehrtafel at Bad Teinach ==
The Kabbalistic Lehrtafel ("teaching painting") of Princess Antonia at Bad Teinach stands over six metres tall and five metres wide, dominating the area to the right of the altar in the small church. Planned in 1652 by the princess with a circle of court academic advisors, it was executed in 1659-1663 by Johann Friedrich Gruber, the court painter at Stuttgart, and installed in 1673 at Bad Teinach, where the ducal family used to take holidays in summer, and where Antonia's brother Duke Eberhard had established the church as a private family chapel, built in 1662-1665.

The painting is in the form of a triptych. The two outside panels depict the procession of the soul as the mystical bride of Christ. These open to reveal in two flanking panels a daytime scene of the finding of Moses in the Nile, and a night-time scene of the flight of the Holy Family to Egypt; and in the centre an immensely detailed systema totius mundi - a depiction of a philosophical system of the whole world.

The central panel finds a woman holding in her right hand a flaming heart (charity), with in her left an anchor (faith) and a cross (hope), standing at the threshold of a garden enclosed by a hedge of roses. In the middle of the garden is Jesus, and around him a circle of the fathers of the twelve tribes of Israel.

Beyond them hovers a female figure, in front of a richly decorated temple with an onion dome. Arranged in the composition on and around the temple are nine female figures representing the sephirot, according to their places in the traditional tree of life of the Kabbalah. The tenth of the sephirot, Malchut (kingdom), is represented by the figure of Christ himself. Everywhere in the execution there is more and more intricate detail, symbol upon symbol, meaning upon meaning.

== Ancestry ==
Ancestors of Antonia of Württemberg

8. George I of Württemberg-Mömpelgard
4. Frederick I, Duke of Württemberg
9. Barbara of Hesse
2. Johann Frederick, Duke of Württemberg
10. Joachim Ernest, Prince of Anhalt
5. Sibylla of Anhalt
11. Agnes of Barby-Mühlingen
1. Antonia of Württemberg
12. John George, Elector of Brandenburg
6. Joachim Frederick, Elector of Brandenburg
13. Sophie of Legnica
3. Barbara Sophie of Brandenburg
14. John, Margrave of Brandenburg-Küstrin
7. Catherine of Brandenburg-Küstrin
15. Catherine of Brunswick-Wolfenbüttel
