= Leopold Eberhard, Duke of Württemberg-Montbéliard =

Leopold Eberhard of Württemberg-Montbéliard (21 May 1670, Montbéliard – 25 March 1723, Montbéliard), was a German prince member of the House of Württemberg. He was Count of Coligny since 1680 (in succession of his mother) and Duke of Württemberg-Montbéliard since 1699 (in succession of his father) until his death. The first half of his life he was in exile and in military service of the House of Austria and lived for a long time in Silesia; only in 1697 he and his family were able to return of Montbéliard, and two years later he assumed the government as the last legitimate male member of his dynasty. He gained a doubtful fame mainly through his arbitrary and absolutist rule as well as by his extravagant family life, which is why he is considered the "Black Sheep" of the House of Württemberg.

== Origins ==
His father was George II (5 October 1626 – 1 June 1699), who in 1662 succeeded his older half-brother Leopold Frederick as Duke of Württemberg-Montbéliard; however, in 1676 he was expelled from his domains by the troops of King Louis XIV of France and only was able to return in 1697, two years before his death.

George II was a member of the Imperial Comital and (since 1496) Ducal House of Württemberg in the cadet branch founded in 1617 after the division of the family lands between John Frederick, Duke of Württemberg and his younger brothers, among them Louis Frederick (father of George II), who received the possessions on the left bank of the Rhine (Montbéliard, Riquewihr and Horburg) with full sovereignty.

His mother was Anne de Coligny (4 September 1624 – 13 January 1680), who jointly with her older sister Henriette de Coligny became in the heiresses of the County of Coligny (now a commune in the Ain department in eastern France) following the recreation of the County by a decree of the King of France after the death of the last male heir of the House of Coligny, Henry-Gaspard de Coligny (Anne and Henriette's nephew and 3rd Duke of Coligny) in 1657.

Anne de Coligny was a member of one of the oldest princely houses in Europe, as the County of Coligny was ruled since medieval times by the House of Coligny, the so-called "Principality of Coligny", which belonged firstly to the Kingdom of Burgundy and later belonged to the Duchy of Savoy, with Revermont and parts of Bresse belonged to the Holy Roman Empire.

== Life ==
=== Youth in exile ===
The eighth and youngest child of Duke George II of Württemberg-Montbéliard by his wife, Countess Anne de Coligny, Leopold Eberhard was born on 21 May 1670 in the city of Montbéliard. He was the third son of his parents but the only one who survived infancy: his older brothers, Otto Frederick and Conrad Louis, died in infancy in 1653 and 1659 respectively, long before his birth.

His youth was traumatized by the fact that his family was expelled from their ancestral domains when Leopold Eberhard was just a 6-years-old boy, and only returned to Montbéliard after 22 years of exile at the age of 28. This was because since the end of the 17th century Württemberg was involved in the war between the Holy Roman Empire and the Kingdom of France, the Nine Years' War, the Great Turkish War and the War of the Spanish Succession, who caused major devastating in the west parts of the country. Württemberg particularly suffered the attacks of foreign troops, like King Louis XIV who successfully conquered the left-bank possessions of Württemberg under his control, with Montbéliard occupied by French troops during 1676-1679 and 1680-1697.

In 1676, Leopold Eberhard had to flee with his father Duke George II from their domains. In 1680, the 10-year-old Leopold Eberhard became Comte de Coligny after the death of his mother, the sole surviving heiress of Comte Gaspard III de Coligny. A few years later, in 1684, was offered to the exiled family the opportunity to return, but only if Duke George II recognized the French authority over his domains and thus leaving the Federation of the Holy Roman Empire; he immediately rejected the offer. Until 1698, Montbéliard was ruled by Frederick Charles, Duke of Württemberg-Winnental (George II's first-cousin) as regent, but also served as a guardian for his underage nephew Eberhard Louis, Duke of Württemberg; however, due to the outbreak of the Nine Years' War, Frederick Charles and his ward were forced to flee to Nuremberg and were temporarily captured in 1692 by French troops. Only after the end of the Nine Years' War by the Treaty of Ryswick could Duke George II (and thus his heir Leopold Eberhard) return to Montbéliard.

=== Military service ===
As a landless prince with little prospect of ever being able to rule Montbéliard, Leopold Eberhard followed a military career in Austria and, after having proved his worth, was made colonel by Emperor Leopold I and took part in various battles against the Ottomans in Hungary, distinguished himself as the commander of Tokaj Fortress and successfully he drove them of the country.

He then lived several years in exile with his Württemberg cousins who ruled the Duchy of Oels since 1649. The ducal court was established in the city of Oels (now Oleśnica, located in the Lower Silesian Voivodeship in southwestern Poland). Leopold Eberhard therefore lived for several years in Silesia. There he met Anna Sabine Hedwiger, a lady-in-waiting at the court of Oels, and fell in love with her; they married on 1 June 1695 at the town of Rejowiz near Poznań in order to legitimized their newborn child. Because according to the laws of the House of Württemberg this union was morganatic, the ceremony was secret and completely ignored by Duke George II, who was already prepared a marriage for him with a princess of royal blood.

=== Duke of Württemberg-Montbéliard ===
After the conclusion of the Treaty of Ryswick in 1697, George II could return to Montbéliard; however, the country had suffered territorial losses due to the peace conditions. When his father died in 1699, Leopold Eberhard succeeded him as Duke of Württemberg-Mömpelgard, as his older brothers had died prematurely. Its dominions extended primarily to the historic County of Montbéliard, which at the beginning of the 15th century passed to the House of Württemberg through the marriage of Henriette, the last Countess from the House of Montfaucon with Eberhard IV, Count of Württemberg. The capital of County, now called Montbéliard, is located in the Doubs department in the Bourgogne-Franche-Comté region in France.

In addition to Montbéliard, Leopold Eberhard inherited the County of Horburg (now Horbourg-Wihr, an Alsatian commune in the Haut-Rhin department in Grand Est in north-eastern France) and a number of cities, such as Blamont, Châtelot, Clérmont, Héricourt, Franquemont and Reichenweier (now Riquewihr), also a commune in the Haut-Rhin department.

The style of government developed by Leopold Eberhard after his succession to the throne didn't add much to his popularity. The County of Montbéliard, marked by decades of war, by marauding troops and by foreign occupation, would have needed a paterfamilias open to the needs of the population, but received an absolutist ruler who, perhaps through decades of exile, preferred his interests to the detriment of his subjects. This autocratic style of government led in 1704 to considerable unrest and riots of the population of Montbéliard against their sovereign. Leopold Eberhard, who saw himself questioned his sovereign rights, ordered the lifting of urban privileges and immunities as a punishment. However, the city administration didn't want to accept this, so it turned to their liege lord, the Holy Roman Emperor, to protest and to remedy the situation. In his arrogance, Leopold Eberhard considered this act as an attack on his person and an open revolution and decided to restore order through military force. Since he couldn't count with the support of either his German cousins or neighbors, he turned to King Louis XIV and asked him for the deployment of French troops to quell the uprising. If the use of military force against the population alone was sufficient reason to lose all sympathies of his subjects, then the use of French troops contributed to the hatred of the country, since the hard time of the French occupation was still clearly remembered. For years, the Holy Roman Empire had been overshadowed by war and was blamed, not without reason, for the devastation of its own land.

Similarly, his economic policy was arbitrary, as he sought to improve his financial position at the expense of his subjects. In order to obtain more funds, he began to make illegal expropriations, using the "right of confiscation" who entered in practice after the Thirty Years War: because of the widespread devastation and the high mortality among the rural population several properties became vacant and as sovereign lord over these domains, in 1713 he sent to each locality officers in his name to confiscate property whose owners were unable to show titles of property. For many farmers, however, this was impossible, as not only people and animals were killed by the past wars, but also burned all the documents with the houses; because many could not prove their property they lost their possessions to the sovereigns, which caused great indignation throughout the country and odious expropriations, but the people was too fearful and ignorant about law that they weren't unable to oppose with the necessary energy. As one of the few positive aspects of his administration, it should be mentioned that Leopold Eberhard used parts of the confiscated lands (especially in the land of Etobon near Héricourt) to settle peasants from other parts of the country in war-torn and ruined lands, thereby revitalizing the economy. Among them were numerous Mennonites who had been expelled from Switzerland and Alsace for religious reasons, which contributed significantly to the improvement of agriculture in the County of Montbéliard, as they were diligent and open to innovation, including land cultivation (especially potatoes) and livestock in Montbéliard, and improving in the breed of cattle (see Montbéliarde cattle).

=== Private life ===
A special part of Leopold Eberhard's biography was his scandalous family life.

Married since 1 June 1695 with the Silesian lady-in-waiting Anne Sabine Hedwiger, this union according to the family laws of the House of Württemberg was morganatic; for this, Leopold Eberhard urged the Emperor to give his wife a noble title. In order to obtain this, he showed proofs that the Hedwiger family had noble origins and served the Empire with loyalty and dedication during generations; even a genealogy was constructed to support the claim. However, the case remained in suspense for the next six years. In the meanwhile, Leopold Eberhard and Anne Sabine had four children, of whom only two survive infancy:

- Leopold Eberhard (b. 30 March 1695 – d. 7 March 1709), born before their parents' marriage, was legitimized; Count of Sponeck since 1701.
- Leopoldine Eberhardine (baptized 15 February 1697 – d. 1786), Countess of Sponeck since 1701; married on 31 August 1719 with her adopted (and reputed biological) half-brother Karl Leopold von Sandersleben.
- George Leopold (baptized 12 December 1697 – d. ca. 1750); Count of Sponeck since 1701; married on 22 February 1719 with his adopted (and reputed biological) half-sister Eleonore Charlotte von Sandersleben.
- Charlotte Leopoldine (b. 1700 – d. 3 February 1703), Countess of Sponeck since 1701.

However, soon the marriage failed, mostly because of Leopold Eberhard's unfaithfulness. During his campaigns against the Turks, the prince developed a friendship with Richard Curie, also known as "l'Espérance" (the Hope, a war nickname), Captain of the Imperial army and son of a sergeant of justice in Montbéliard. Richard had five children, one son and four daughters; the Curie sisters (Sébastienne, Polixène, Henriette Edwige and Élisabeth Charlotte) were able to seduce Leopold Eberhard, and at one point all became his mistresses; however, at the end only Henriette Edwige and Élisabeth Charlotte were able to kept the interest of the prince.

After their return to Montbéliard in 1697, Leopold Eberhard persuaded his wife to take the two Curie sisters as ladies-in-waiting. Without any care of the mockery of his subjects, Leopold Eberhard lived with his wife and mistresses until 1700, when Anne Sabine, found this situation unbearable, and finally separated from her husband (but without divorcing him) and moved to the castle of Héricourt, where she remained for the rest of her days.

Finally, on 1 August 1701 Anne Sabine Hedwiger was created Countess of Sponeck (with the title of "Hoch- und Wohlgeboren") by the Emperor with the same title awarded to her children. The castle chosen by the title was a small Burg situated in the banks of the Rhine, and belonged to the House of Württemberg for generations. Despite the estrangement between him and Anne Sabine, Leopold Eberhard obtained for his brothers-in-law Georg Wilhelm Hedwiger (who continue to serve as the Duke's governor in the castle of Montbéliard) and Johann Rudolf Hedwiger the title of Count of Sponeck for each of them.

At first, was Henriette Edwige Curie who obtain the supremacy over the Leopold Eberhard's heart, and she became in his official mistress. However, the Duke marry her in 1697 with Johann Ludwig von Sandersleben, who appeared as the legal father of Henriette Edwige's first three children:

- Karl Leopold von Sandersleben (b. 1698 – d. after 19 October 1759), Baron de l'Esperance since 1700, Count of Coligny since 1716; married on 31 August 1719 with his (reputed biological) half-sister Countess Leopoldine Eberhardine of Sponeck.
- Ferdinand Eberhard von Sandersleben (b. 31 August 1699 – d. after 19 October 1759), Baron de l'Esperance since 1700, Count of Coligny since 1716; married on 16 July 1737 with Baroness Franziska Benigna Waldner von Freundstein (b. 8 February 1716 – d. 21 February 1750).
- Eleonore Charlotte von Sandersleben (b. 14 October 1700 – d. 11 November 1773), Baroness de l'Esperance since 1700, Countess of Coligny since 1716; married on 22 February 1719 with her (reputed biological) half-brother Count George Leopold of Sponeck.

In order to improve the status of his mistress, on 11 September 1700 Leopold Eberhard managed to obtain from the Emperor the title of Baroness de l'Esperance for Henriette Edwige and her children; in addition, the title was extended to Henriette's surviving siblings (including Élisabeth Charlotte, who also was another mistress of the Duke) and their issue. After a short-lived union, on 1 March 1701 Henriette Edwige obtained the divorce from her husband, and from this point she and her children began to live at the Montbéliard court. The real paternity of the Sandersleben children was questioned, but in all probability all were fathered by Leopold Eberhard.

Henriette Edwige and Leopold Eberhard had five children, of whom only two survived infancy:

- Baroness Elisabeth de l'Esperance (b. 1 May 1702 – d. 12 March 1703).
- Baroness Eberhardine de l'Esperance (b. 18 May 1703 – d. after 1756).
- Baron Leopold Eberhard de l'Esperance (b. 13 August 1704 – d. 15 May 1705).
- Baroness Leopoldine Eberhardine de l'Esperance (b. 15 September 1705 – d. after 1756).
- Baroness Henriette Hedwig de l'Esperance (b. 27 May 1707 – d. May 1709).

Henriette Edwige Curie died on 7 November 1707, six months after her last childbirth. In 1714, Leopold Eberhard legally adopted the three Sandersleben children. On 6 October of that year, the marriage between Leopold Eberhard and Anne Sabine Hedwiger was finally dissolved by the consistorium of Montbéliard under the grounds of "incompatibilité d'humeur" (incompatibility of characters), under the condition that neither of them remarry; however, Anne Sabine contracted a second marriage in 1719 with Roger de Langheac (d. 1746), 6th Marquis de Coligny 2nd Comte de Dalet and descendant of Charles de Coligny. She died on 9 November 1735.

On 10 August 1716, Leopold Eberhard gave to his Sandersleben adoptive children the County of Coligny, jointly with his own biological legally surviving offspring; from them they were called Count/Countess of Sandersleben-Coligny. The official French recognition of this cession was confirmed on 5 February 1718 in Paris; six months later (15 August), the Duke contracted a second married with Élisabeth Charlotte Curie, sister of Henriette and also another of his mistresses.

They had six children (some of them born before the wedding and subsequently legitimized), of whom only two survived to adulthood:

- Baroness Henriette Hedwig de l'Esperance (b. 22 April 1711 – d. 1728), born before their parents' marriage, was legitimized.
- Baron Leopold Eberhard de l'Esperance (b. 28 July 1712 – d. Ostheim, 13 September 1730), born before their parents' marriage, was legitimized.
- Baron George de l'Esperance (b. 8 November 1714 – d. 12 January 1715), born and died before their parents' marriage.
- Baron Karl Leopold de l'Esperance (b. 1716 – d. 25 July 1793), born before their parents' marriage, was legitimized; Imperial Count of Horneburg since 1761. Married three times: firstly on 16 May 1741 with Maria Jose de Fuentes de Toledo de Castilla (b. 1718/19 – d. 30 June 1752), secondly with Baroness Elisabeth Charlotte von Malsen-Tilborch, and thirdly on 15 July 1783 with Marie Judith de la Riviere (b. 4 January 1748 – d. Orléans, 28 May 1834).
- Baroness Elisabeth Charlotte de l'Esperance (b. 31 December 1717 – d. 1729), born before their parents' marriage, was legitimized
- Baron George Frederick de l'Esperance (b. Montbéliard, 16 August 1722 – d. Graz, 20 January 1760), married Countess Therese von Hartig (b. 1 September 1728 – 23 March 1797).

=== Succession and death ===
A major scandal erupted when in 1719, Leopold Eberhard arranged the marriage of his two surviving children from his first marriage with his Sandersleben adopted children, who are in all probability his own biological offspring; in addition, the Duke began to sought to have all of his children declared legitimate and apt to succeed him, despite the previously signed Wilbader Treaty (18 May 1715) with his kinsman Eberhard Louis, Duke of Württemberg, where he recognized that he never married according to the family laws and that none of his children had any succession rights. In 1721, Leopold Eberhard asked the Emperor the recognition of his second marriage and the title of Hereditary Prince of Montbéliard for his oldest surviving son Count George Leopold of Sponeck, but his efforts were unsuccessful.

Leopold Eberhard died on 25 March 1723 aged 53 and was buried on 27 March at night without much ceremony in the crypt of the Church of Saint-Maimbœuf of Montbéliard.

The Duke's children Count Georg Leopold of Sponeck as well as the Barons de l'Espérance sued, but their claims were rejected by the Reichshofrat on 8 April 1723, which said that "according to the known laws and customs of Germany and the family compact of 1617, the children were unable to inherit to the princely dignity and to succeed to the immediate imperial estates and fiefs". The children then took the dispute to French courts, which sequestered the estates in Mömpelgard (Montbéliard). Finally the French courts rejected their claims in 1747 and in 1748 the duke of Würtemberg came into possession of Mömpelgard. The dispute dragged on for years and the duke's descendants did not give in until 1761.
