= Barbara Sophie of Brandenburg =

Dutchess (1584–1636)

Barbara Sophia of Brandenburg
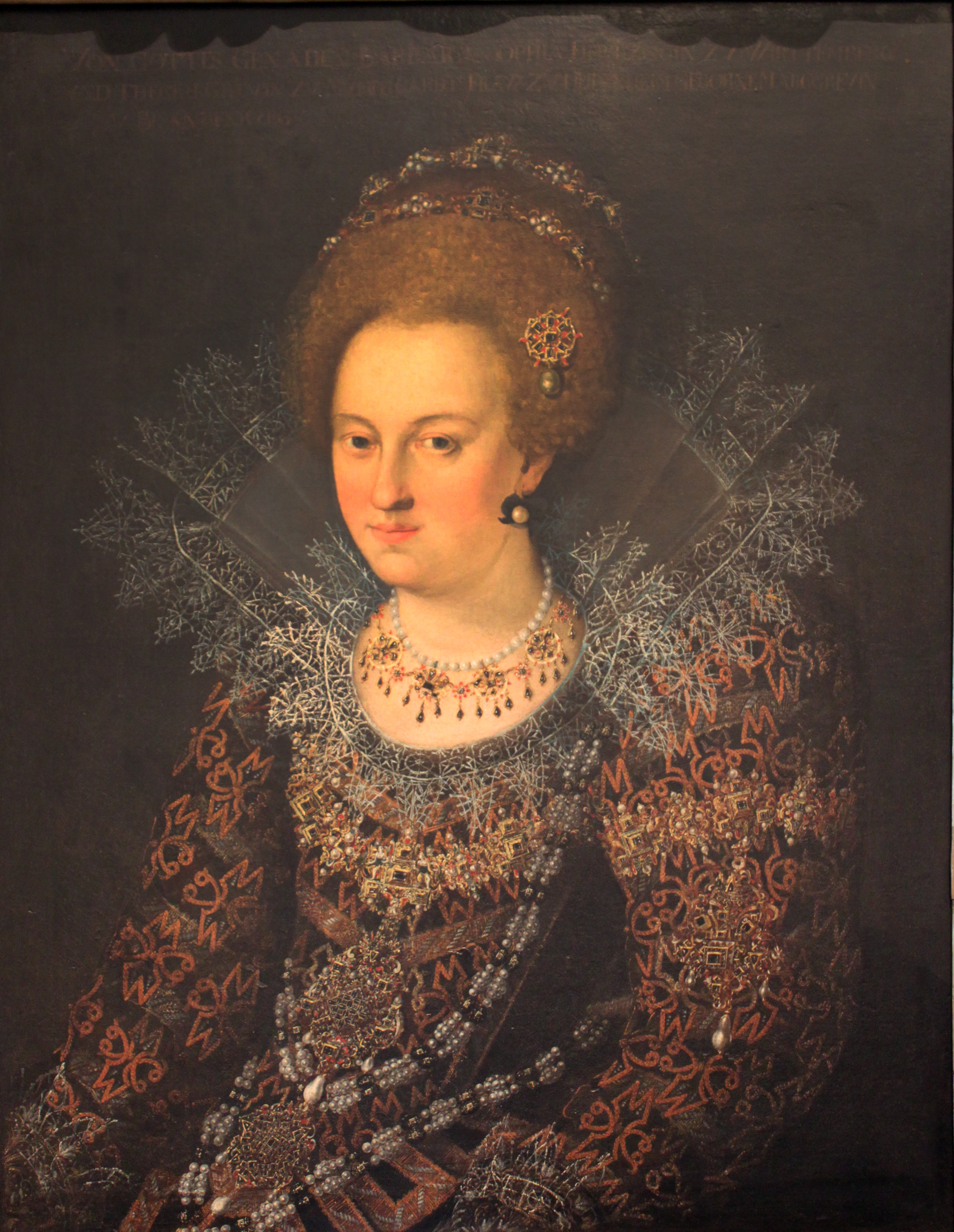
- Princess Barbara Sophia of Brandenburg, the later Duchess and Regent of Württemberg

Duchess consort of Württemberg
- Tenure: 5 November 1609 – 18 July 1628
- Born: 16 November 1584; Halle, Archbishopric of Magdeburg, Holy Roman Empire
- Died: 13 February 1636 (aged 51); Strasbourg, Germany
- Burial: Stiftskirche (Stuttgart)
- Spouse: John Frederick, Duke of Württemberg (m. 1609; died 1628)
- Issue among others…: Antonia of Württemberg; Eberhard III, Duke of Württemberg; Frederick, Duke of Württemberg-Neuenstadt
- House: Hohenzollern
- Father: Joachim Frederick, Elector of Brandenburg
- Mother: Catherine of Brandenburg-Küstrin

Barbara Sophia of Brandenburg (16 November 1584 – 13 February 1636) was duchess of Württemberg by marriage to Duke John Frederick of Württemberg and acted as regent of the Duchy of Württemberg for their minor son, Duke Eberhard III of Württemberg, in 1631–1633. She was the daughter of the Catherine of Küstrin (1549–1602) and Elector Joachim Frederick of Brandenburg.

== Life ==
On 5 November 1609, she married Duke John Frederick of Württemberg (1582–1628), eldest son of Frederick I and Sibylla of Anhalt. On the occasion of their marriage, he had the Golden Hall was built in Urach Palace in Bad Urach, which is today one of the most beautiful Renaissance ballrooms in Germany. They reportedly had a very happy marriage.

Her husband died in 1628. In 1630, she began an extensive renovation of Brackenheim Castle, which was promised to her as her wittum. The castle contained an art room with 155 paintings, at the time the second largest collection in Württemberg. The art room was well preserved until her death, despite the Thirty Years' War ravaging the country around it. During the renovation of her castle, she lived in Schloss Kirchheim in Kirchheim unter Teck, and in Stuttgart. She never lived in Brackenheim, despite the castle, the city, and the district forming her wittum. Nevertheless, she was considered a benefactor of the city, due to her dedication to the city during the Thirty Years' War and to the foundations she founded.

When her husband died, her 14-year-old son Eberhard III was still a minor and his uncle Louis Frederick, Duke of Württemberg-Montbéliard acted as regent. After Frederick Louis died on 26 January 1631, the regency was taken up by Barbara Sophia and Julius Frederick, Duke of Württemberg-Weiltingen, with Barbara Sophia being "high regent". She therefore moved back to Stuttgart in 1632 and became politically active. After the Battle of Lutzen in late 1632, Julius Frederick joined the war on the Swedish side. His goal was to drive enemy troops out of the country, as well as the Catholic former owners of secularized church properties. Despite his successes, he was accused of acting selfishly. The councilors and the Estates managed to drive him out of the regency.

After Emperor Ferdinand II declared Eberhard III to be an adult, he took up government on 8 May 1633. He joined the Protestant Heilbronn League which suffered a crushing defeat at the Battle of Nördlingen on 6 September 1634. Württemberg was then looted and pillaged. Duke Eberhard and his entire court hastily fled into exile in Strasbourg.

Barbara Sophia died in Strasbourg in 1636 and was buried in the Stiftskirche, Stuttgart.

== Issue ==
From their marriage Barbara Sophia had the following children:

- Henrietta (1610–1623), died unmarried
- Frederick (1612-1612), died in infancy
- Antonia (1613–1679)
- Eberhard III (1614–1674), Duke of Württemberg, married
  1. in 1637 Wild-Rhinegravine Anna Catherine of Salm-Kyrburg (1614–1655)
  2. in 1656 Countess Maria Dorothea of Oettingen (1639–1698)
- Frederick (1615–1682), Duke of Württemberg-Neuenstadt
  1. married in 1653 Princess Clara Augusta of Brunswick-Wolfenbüttel (1632–1700)
- Ulrich (1617–1671), Duke of Württemberg-Neuenbürg, married
  1. in 1647 Countess Sophia Dorothea of Solms-Sonnewalde (1622–1648)
  2. in 1651 Princess Isabella d'Arenberg (1623–1678)
- Anna Johanna (1619–1679)
- Sibylle (1620–1707)
  1. married in 1647 Duke Leopold Frederick of Württemberg-Montbéliard (1624–1662)
- Eberthal (1623-1624), died in infancy
