= Georg I of Württemberg-Mömpelgard =

German noble (1498–1558)

George I of Württemberg-Mömpelgard
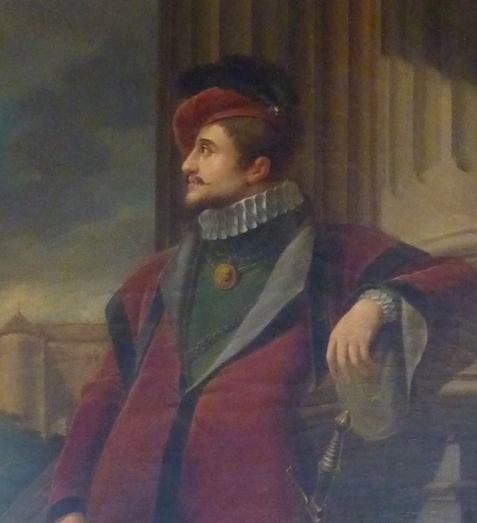
- Born: 4 February 1498; Urach Castle, Bad Urach
- Died: 17 July 1558 (aged 60); Kirkel Castle, Kirkel
- Spouse: Barbara of Hesse (m. 1555)
- Issue: Ulrich; Frederick I, Duke of Württemberg; Eva Christina
- House: Württemberg
- Father: Henry, Count of Württemberg
- Mother: Eva of Salm

George I of Württemberg-Montbéliard, nicknamed "the Cautious" (4 February 1498 at Urach Castle in Bad Urach – 17 July 1558 at Kirkel Castle in Kirkel) was a son of Henry of Württemberg and his second wife, the Countess Eva of Salm.

In 1514, he received the County of Harburg, the city of Riquewihr and Bilstein Castle. In 1519, his older brother, Duke Ulrich was deposed and exiled from Württemberg. George tried to support him militarily, and was forced to go into exile to Strasbourg. On 2 September 1526, Ulrich sold him the County of Montbéliard and associated Lordships, with an option to buy it back.

In 1531, George joined the Protestant Schmalkaldic League against Emperor Charles V. With the help of Landgrave Philip I of Hesse, his brother Ulrich was able to regain power in Württemberg. Ulrich re-purchased Montbéliard and in 1542, appointed his son Christopher as governor there.

After the defeat of the Schmalkaldic League in 1547, the Emperor intended to take the Country of Montbéliard. Ulrich died in 1550. After the Peace of Passau of 1552, Württemberg was allowed to keep Montbéliard. In 1553, Christoper returned Montbéliard to his uncle George, who then ruled the county until his death in 1558.

When in 1593, Christoper's son Louis III died without a male heir, George's son Frederick inherited the Duchy of Württemberg.

== Marriage and issue ==
In 1555, George married the 19-year-old Barbara of Hesse (1536-1597), a daughter of Landgrave Philip I of Hesse. They had three children:

- Ulrich (1556-1557)
- Frederick (1557-1608), married Sibylla of Anhalt (1564-1614), a daughter of Prince Joachim Ernest of Anhalt (1536-1586)
- Eva Christina (1558-1575)

Georg I of Württemberg-Mömpelgard House of Württemberg Born: 4 February 1498 Died: 17 July 1558
Preceded by Ulrich	Count of Montbéliard; 1526-1534	Succeeded by Ulrich
Preceded by Christopher	Count of Montbéliard; 1553-1558	Succeeded by Frederick
