= Stiftskirche, Stuttgart =

Church in Stuttgart, Germany

Stiftskirche
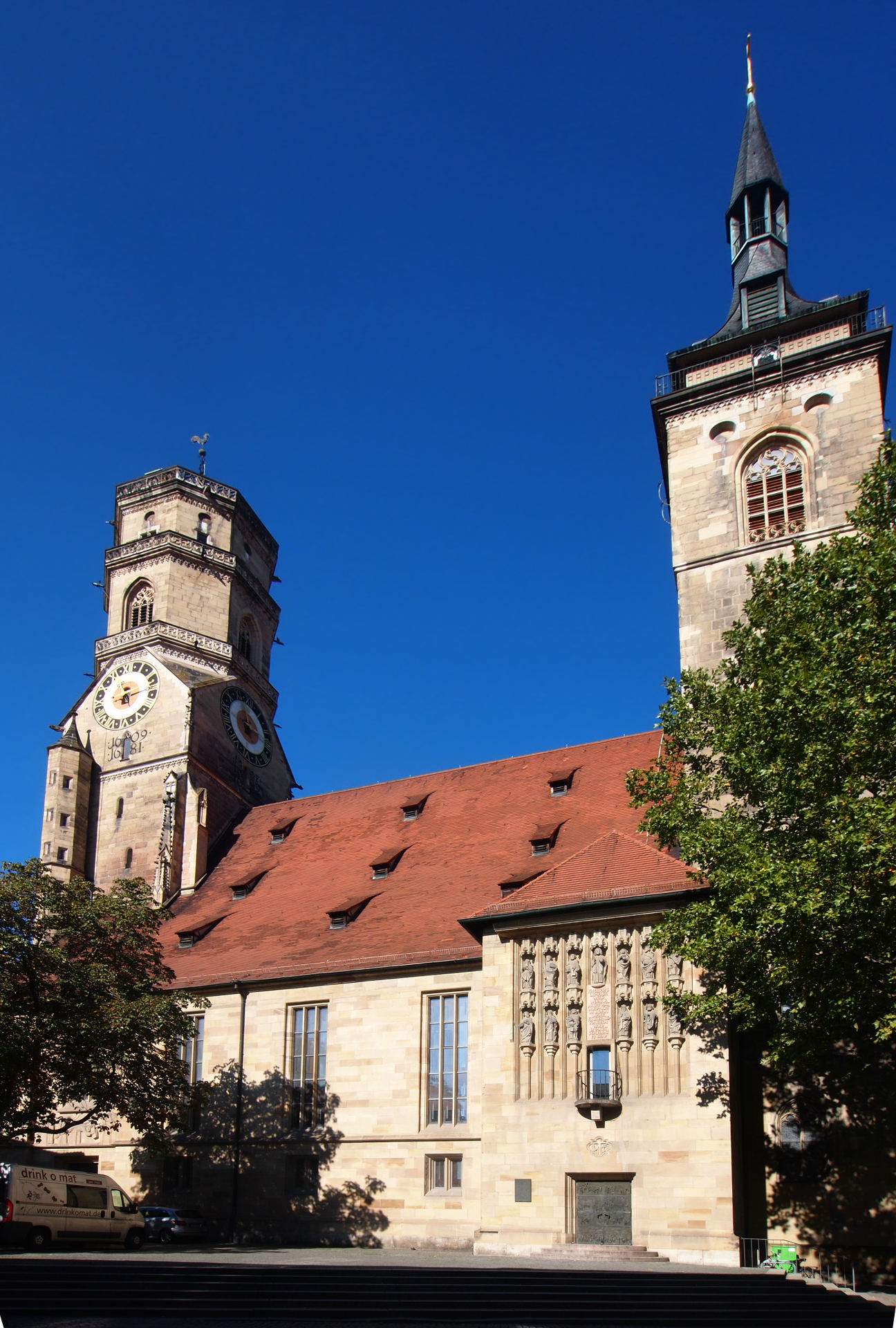
- South-east, long side with Apostles gate
- Stiftskirche
- 48°46′36.12″N 9°10′41.02″E
- Denomination: Lutheran
- Previous denomination: Roman Catholic

Architecture
- Style: Gothic

The Stiftskirche (Collegiate Church) is an inner-city church in Stuttgart, the capital of Baden-Württemberg, Germany. It is the main church of the Evangelical-Lutheran Church in Württemberg (Evangelische Landeskirche in Württemberg) as well as the parish church of the evangelical (Lutheran) inner-city church district of Stuttgart.

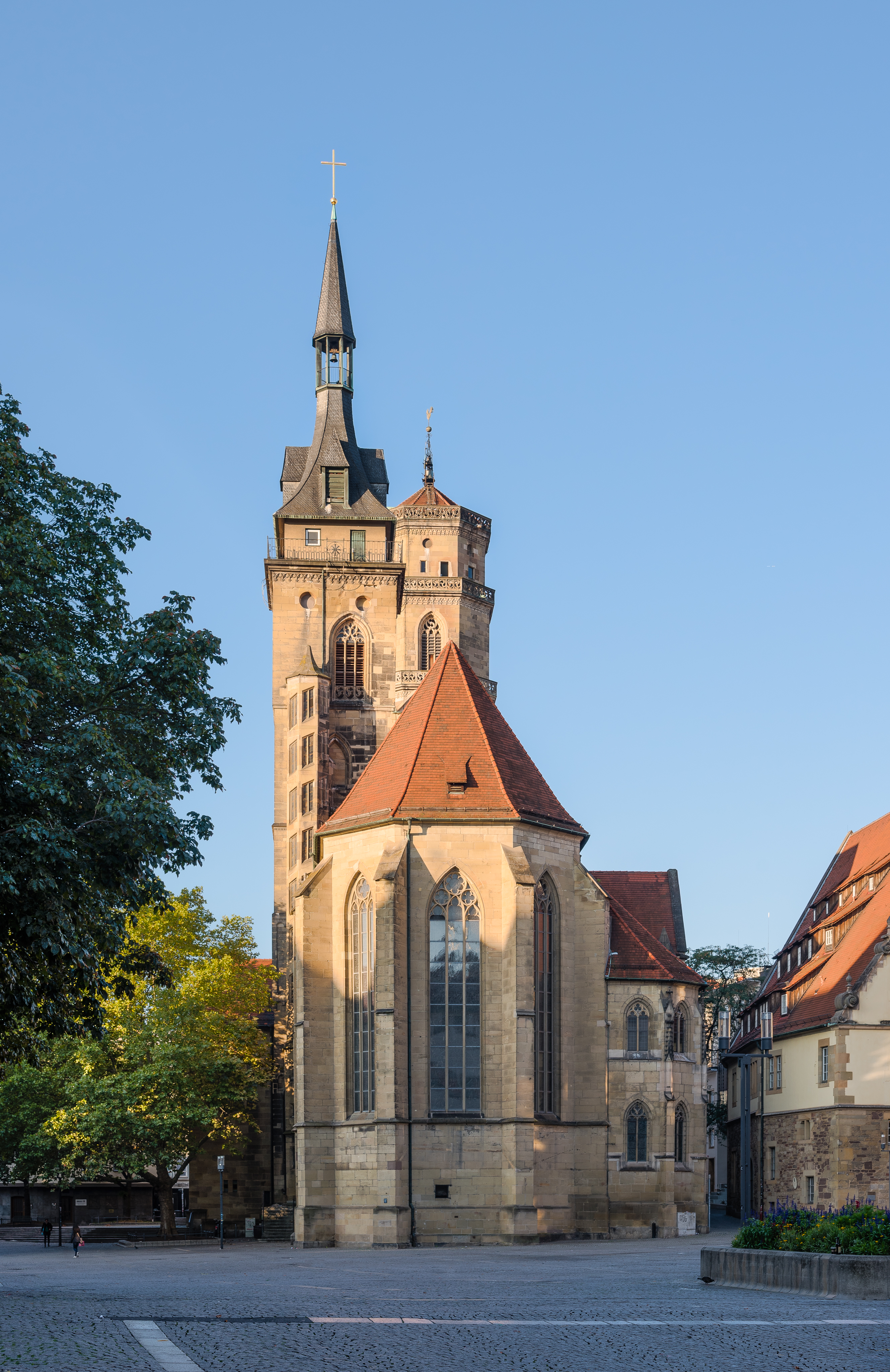
View of the chancel from across Schillerplatz

== History and structure ==
Recent research found structures of a small Romanesque church dating to the 10th and 11th centuries within the outline of today's church.

In 1240, a stately three-naved church with two towers was built in the Romanic style, apparently by the Counts of Württemberg who from around that time were residing in the nearby Old Castle. The remains of Ulrich I, Count of Württemberg and his second wife, Countess of Württemberg, Agnes von Schlesien-Liegnitz (both died in 1265) rest in a double tomb in the south tower chapel that dates to the late 13th century.

When Stuttgart became the new residence of the rulers of Württemberg, they added a new Gothic chancel between 1321 and 1347. Ulrich V added a Late Gothic nave in the second half of the 15th century.

In 1500, a coloured, later (from the 19th century) golden pulpit was added.

With the adoption of the Lutheran Protestant Reformation in Württemberg in 1534, all pictures and altars were removed from the naves, pewage and a gallery were added. The tombstones were moved to the interior of the church.

The Lutheran reformer Johannes Brenz, the main Protestant Reformer of Württemberg, was buried under the chancel after his death in 1570.

From 1574, small statues of all the Counts of Württemberg (i.e. since Ulrich I) were added at the North wall of the chancel.

In 1608, a new grave crypt or burial vault was added. All of the Württemberg rulers until 1677 were buried there. Catherine Pavlovna of Russia, Queen of Württemberg from 1816 until 1819, was buried here from 1819 to 1824, before her remains were brought to a mausoleum on the Württemberg mountain.

In 1826, the roof of the chancel was renovated, as was most of the interior of the church in the 1840s.

Near the end of World War II, the church was heavily damaged by the bombing raids on Stuttgart in 1944. The church was rebuilt in the 1950s, however, the interior was rebuilt in a modern style.

== Bells ==
The collegiate church has a collection of eleven church bells . Eight of these bells are rung electrically, and two bells serve to strike the clock. The two hour bells hang in the west tower spire, and the eight ringing bells are distributed between the south tower and the west tower. The largest or bourdon is Osanna which also serves to strike the hours.

The oldest bell hangs in the south tower. It dates back to 1285 and is called the "Gate Bell" because it was rung in the evening before the city gates were closed, to remind citizens outside the city walls to return home. Even today, the gate bell is rung by rope and is not part of the main bell service of the collegiate church; it is rung only on special occasions.

Four of the eight ringing bells date from the 20th century. The remaining four are medieval bells, including the two largest bells in the peal, which were cast in 1520 by the bell founder Martin Kissling (Biberach ad Riß).

Some of the medieval bells have been lost over time. Notable among these is the Gallus bell, which probably hung first on the small tower and then later on the large tower; it weighed about 900 kg and had a diameter of 110 cm, and struck in F sharp ^{1.} In addition, there was a striking bell around 1473, which did not strike itself, but was rung by the tower watchman when it was struck. In 1486, the bell was apparently cracked, and attempts were made to restore the sound by cutting away the damaged part.

== Gallery ==
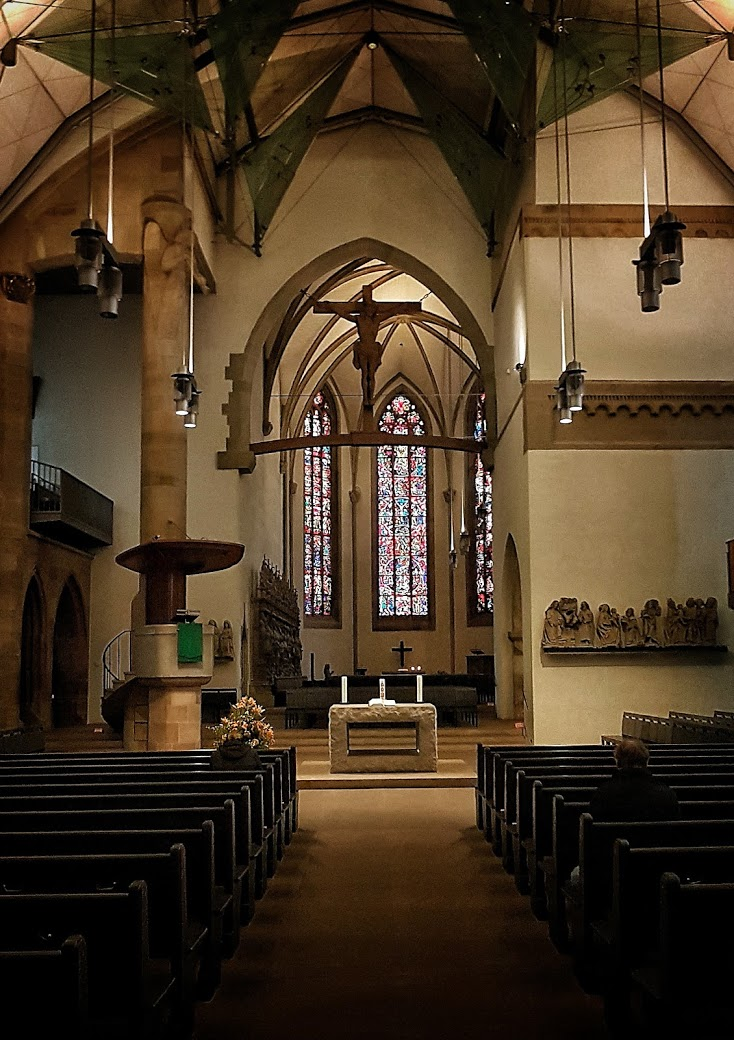
Nave to chancel view

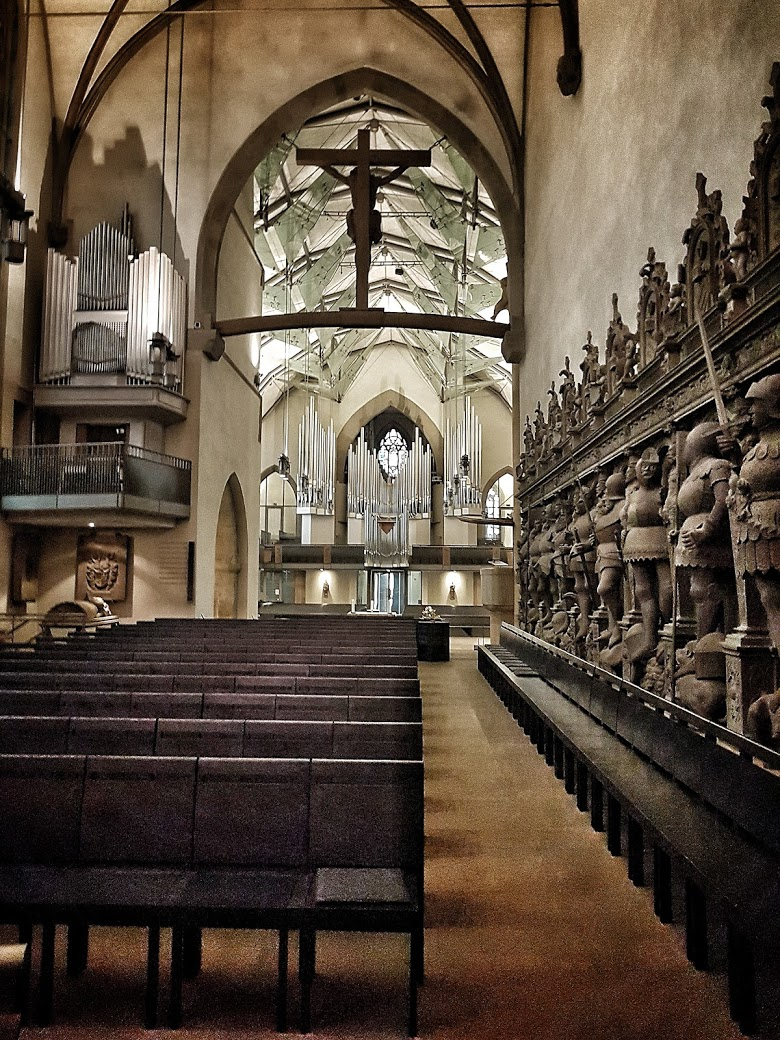
Chancel to nave view

== Other burials ==
- Eberhard I, Count of Württemberg
- Elisabeth of Brandenburg, Duchess of Württemberg
- Frederick I, Duke of Württemberg
- Sibylla of Anhalt
- John Frederick, Duke of Württemberg
- Barbara Sophie of Brandenburg
- Eberhard III, Duke of Württemberg
- Duchess Anne Catherine of Salm
- Maria Dorothea Sophia of Oettingen-Oettingen
- William Louis, Duke of Württemberg
- Magdalena Sibylla of Hesse-Darmstadt

== Renovation ==
The latest major renovation took place from 1999 to 2003. The design and realization of the new concept comes from the Hamburg-based Architect Bernhard Hirche. The altar sculpture was created by the Sculptor Holger Walter.
