= Eberhard III, Duke of Württemberg =

Duke of Württemberg from 1628 to 1674

Eberhard III
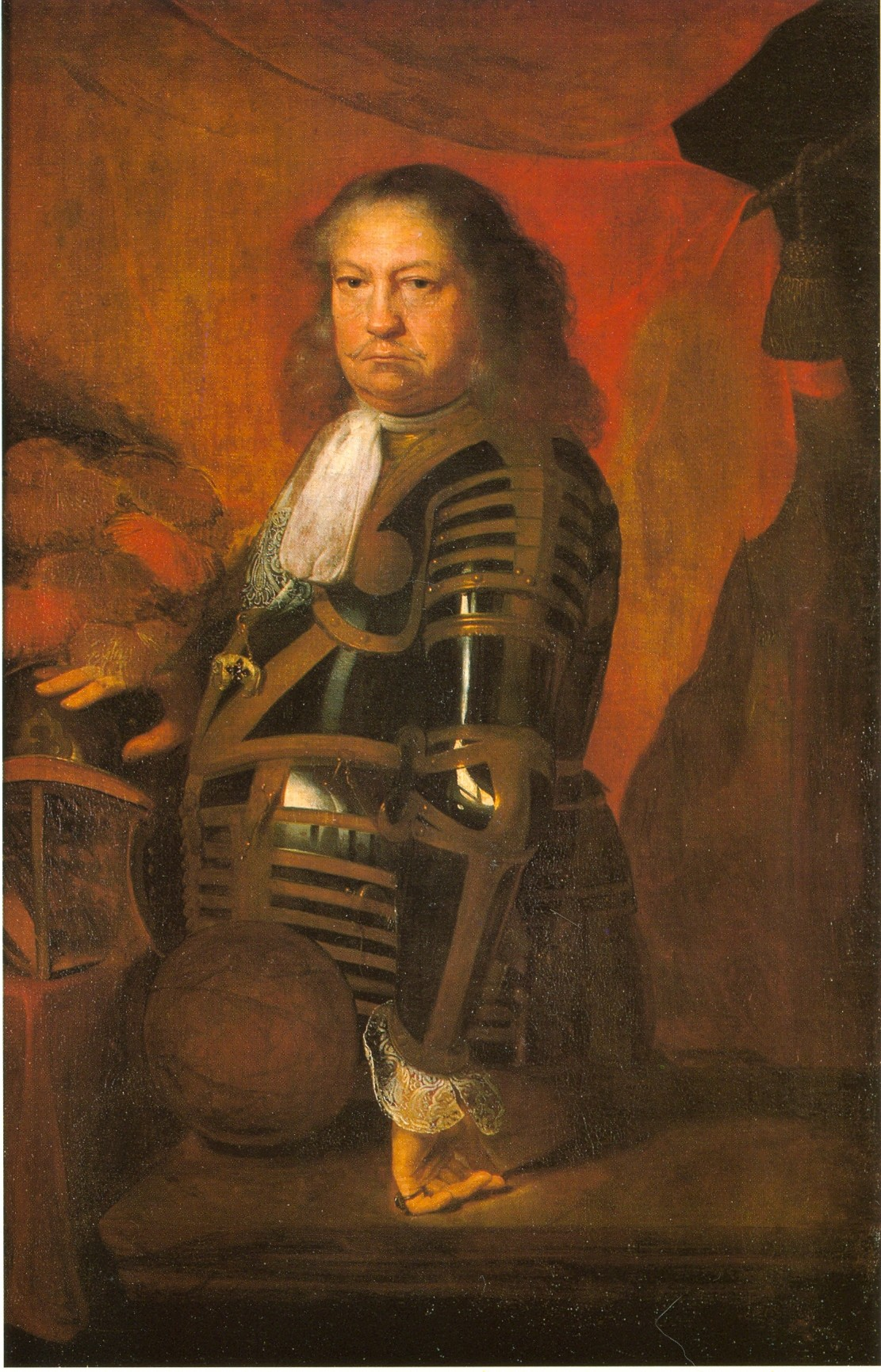
- Portrait, c. 1670

Duke of Württemberg
- Reign: 18 July 1628 – 2 July 1674
- Predecessor: John Frederick
- Successor: William Louis
- Born: 16 December 1614; Stuttgart, Duchy of Württemberg, Holy Roman Empire
- Died: 2 July 1674 (aged 59); Stuttgart
- Spouses: Anna Catharina of Salm-Kyrburg (m. 1637; died 1655) Countess Marie Dorothea Sofie of Oettingen (m. 1656)
- Issue among others: Sophie Luise of Württemberg; Christine Charlotte of Württemberg; William Louis, Duke of Württemberg; Frederick Charles, Duke of Württemberg-Winnental
- House: Württemberg
- Father: John Frederick, Duke of Württemberg
- Mother: Barbara Sophie of Brandenburg
- Religion: Lutheranism

Eberhard III (16 December 1614, Stuttgart – 2 July 1674, Stuttgart) ruled as Duke of Württemberg from 1628 until his death in 1674.

== Biography ==
Eberhard III became the heir under guardianship in 1628 during the Thirty Years' War at the age of 14 after the death of his father, Johann Frederick, 7th Duke of Württemberg. His guardian at first was his uncle Louis Frederick, Duke of Württemberg-Montbéliard, and after his death in 1631, Julius Frederick, Duke of Württemberg-Weiltingen.

Württemberg lost around one third of its territory in 1629. Julius Frederick was removed as guardian in 1633 when Eberhard was declared of full age at which point he assumed full rule of the Duchy. Following a major defeat of Württemberg troops in the battle of Nördlingen on 6 September 1634, Württemberg was severely looted and plundered.

Eberhard fled to Strasbourg, where he married in 1637, returning to Württemberg in 1638 after long negotiations with Ferdinand III of the Holy Roman Empire. By this time, many territories had already been passed on by the Emperor to other parties to push forward Catholicism in the region.

The Duchy of Württemberg was reinstated after long negotiations resulting in the Peace of Westphalia of 1648, despite or maybe because of the effects of war, poverty, hunger and the Bubonic plague all of which reduced the population from 350,000 in 1618 to 120,000 in 1648.

Eberhard III entered into an inheritance agreement with his younger brother Frederick thereby handing over ownership of the Duchy of Württemberg-Neuenstadt and thus establishing a new branch line of the duchy. In 1651, he came to a similar agreement with another brother, Ulrich, affecting the Castle of Neuenbürg.

Eberhard died on 2 July 1674 in Stuttgart.

== Family and children ==
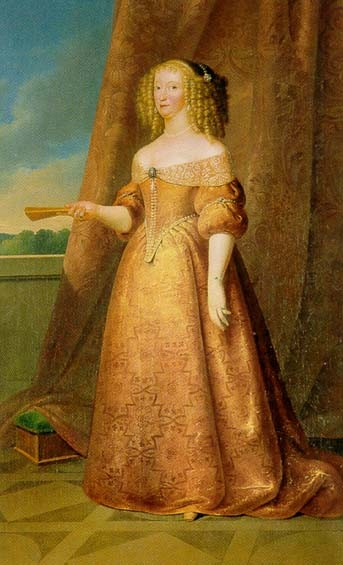
Anna Katharina Dorothea von Salm-Kyrburg

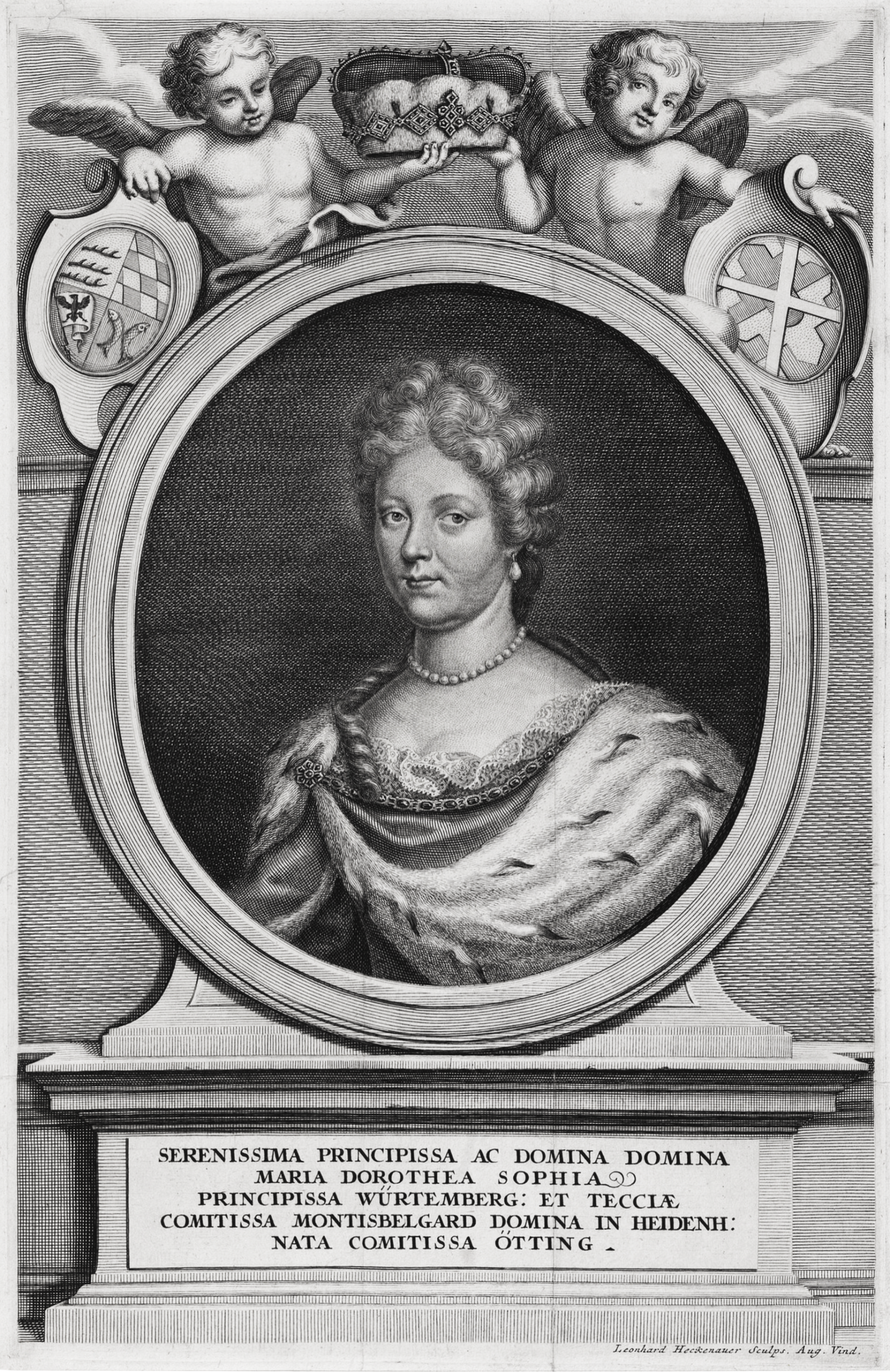
Maria Dorothea Sophia von Oettingen-Oettingen

Eberhard III was the second son of John Frederick, 7th Duke of Württemberg and Barbara Sophie of Brandenburg. He married twice, first on 26 February 1637 with Anna Katharina Dorothea, Wild- and Rheingräfin of Salm-Kyrburg-Mörchingen (27 January 1614 – 27 June 1655). They had fourteen children in just seventeen years, nine of whom lived to adulthood:

- John Frederick of Württemberg-Stuttgart (9 September 1637 – 2 August 1659).
- Louis Frederick of Württemberg-Stuttgart (2 November 1638 – 18 January 1639), died in infancy.
- Christian Eberhard of Württemberg-Stuttgart (29 November 1639 – 23 March 1640), died in infancy.
- Eberhard of Württemberg-Stuttgart (12 December 1640 – 24 February 1641), died in infancy.
- Sophie Louise of Württemberg-Stuttgart (19 February 1642 – 3 October 1702); married on 8 February 1671 to Christian Ernst, Margrave of Brandenburg-Bayreuth.
- Dorothea Amalie of Württemberg-Stuttgart (13 February 1643 – 27 March 1650), died in childhood.
- Christine Friederike of Württemberg-Stuttgart (28 February 1644 – 30 October 1674); married on 28 May 1665 to Prince Albert Ernest I of Oettingen-Oettingen and had issue, among which was the Duchess consort of Brunswick-Lüneburg.
- Christine Charlotte of Württemberg-Stuttgart (21 October 1645 – 16 May 1699), married 8 May 1662 to Prince George Christian, Prince of East Frisia.
- Duke William Louis of Württemberg (7 January 1647 – 23 June 1677).
- Anna Katharine of Württemberg-Stuttgart (27 November 1648 – 10 November 1691).
- Karl Christof of Württemberg-Stuttgart (28 January 1650 – 2 June 1650), died in infancy.
- Eberhardine Katharine of Württemberg-Stuttgart (12 April 1651 – 19 August 1683); married on 30 April 1682 her brother in law, Prince Albert Ernest I of Oettingen-Oettingen.
- Duke Frederick Charles of Württemberg-Winnental (September 1652 – December 1698).
- Karl Maximilian of Württemberg-Stuttgart (28 September 1654 – 9 January 1689).

Secondly, he married on 20 July 1656 with Countess Marie Dorothea Sofie of Oettingen-Oettingen (29 December 1639 – 29 June 1698). They had eleven children, only four of whom lived to adulthood:

- George Frederick of Württemberg-Stuttgart (24 September 1657 – 18 October 1685), killed in the Battle of Kassa against the Ottomans.
- Stillborn son (12 April 1659).
- Albrecht Christian of Württemberg-Stuttgart (13 June 1660 – 20 January 1663), died in childhood.
- Louis of Württemberg-Stuttgart (14 August 1661 – 30 November 1698).
- Joachim Ernst of Württemberg-Stuttgart (28 August 1662 – 16 February 1663), died in infancy.
- Philipp Siegmund of Württemberg-Stuttgart (6 October 1663 – 23 July 1669), died in childhood.
- Karl Ferdinand of Württemberg-Stuttgart (13 October 1667 – 13 June 1668), died in infancy.
- John Frederick of Württemberg-Stuttgart (10 June 1669 – 15 October 1693), died in a duel with count János Pálffy near Herrenberg.
- Sophie Charlotte of Württemberg-Stuttgart (22 February 1671 – 11 September 1717); married on 20 September 1688 to John George II, Duke of Saxe-Eisenach.
- Eberhard of Württemberg-Stuttgart (1 July 1672 – 27 November 1672), died in infancy.
- Emanuel Eberhard of Württemberg-Stuttgart (posthumously, 11 October 1674 – 1 July 1675), died in infancy.

== Ancestry ==
Ancestors of Eberhard III, Duke of Württemberg

8. George I, Duke of Württemberg-Mömpelgard
4. Frederick I, Duke of Württemberg
9. Barbara of Hesse
2. John Frederick, Duke of Württemberg
10. Joachim Ernest, Prince of Anhalt
5. Sibylla of Anhalt-Zerbst
11. Agnes of Barby and Mühlingen
1. Eberhard III, Duke of Württemberg
12. John George, Elector of Brandenburg
6. Joachim Frederick, Elector of Brandenburg
13. Sophie of Legnica
3. Barbara Sophie of Brandenburg
14. John, Margrave of Brandenburg-Küstrin
7. Catherine of Brandenburg-Küstrin
15. Catherine of Brunswick-Wolfenbüttel

== Notes ==
Eberhard III, Duke of Württemberg House of Württemberg Born: 16 December 1614 Died: 2 July 1674
Regnal titles
Preceded by John Frederick	Duke of Württemberg; 1628–1674	Succeeded by William Louis
