= Benjamin von Buwinckhausen =

German diplomat (1571–1635)

Benjamin von Buwinckhausen (1571–1635) was a German diplomat who served the Duchy of Württemberg, and the German Princes of the Protestant Union.

== Biography ==
Buwinckhausen wrote an account of the London coronation of James VI and I and Anne of Denmark on 25 May 1603. He was lodged at Richmond Palace.

On 4 October 1603, Frederick I, Duke of Württemberg was invested in the Order of the Garter by a delegation of James VI and I. Sir Robert Spencer and William Dethick brought him the insignia of the order. Benjamin von Buwinckhausen helped organise the ceremonies in the church and castle in Stuttgart. The jewels including two garters with diamonds and rubies, and two St Georges with diamonds and rubies, and a gold chain or collar, made by the London goldsmiths, John Spilman and William Herrick.

He came to London again in 1608 with Louis Frederick, Duke of Württemberg-Montbéliard. They returned the insignia of the Order of the Garter of the recently deceased Frederick I, Duke of Württemberg and visited Scotland where they were hosted by Andrew Melville of Garvock.

During the 1609 War of the Julich Succession, often he communicated with French minister Villeroy. Buwinckhausen believed that the Protestant Union couldn't defeat the Habsburgs who occupied Julich on its own, and thought that it was necessary to acquire aid from surrounding nations. He also believed that Wolfgang Wilhelm (who jointly claimed the Duchies of Julich-Cleves-Berg alongside Johann Sigismund of Brandenburg) was an unreliable ally that might switch to support the Habsburgs.

He was in England again in 1610 on a diplomatic mission. On 30 April 1610 their secretary recorded that they saw Othello, l'histoire du More de Venise, at the Globe Theatre. The next day they went to Eltham Park to see Cornelius Drebbel demonstrate his perpetual motion machine. They also observed King James fishing with cormorants.

In London in 1620 negotiating with Christopher von Dohna on behalf of Frederick V of the Palatinate and the Princes of the Union, Buwinckhausen refused a gift of valuable silver plate from James VI and I, on the grounds that he was not an ambassador. He was eventually persuaded to accept the silverware. He was also given a gold chain with a portrait medal of the king, provided by a London goldsmith John Acton. The exchequer record of the gift names him as "Benny Couzen".
