= Maria Andreae =

German pharmacist

Maria Andreae (c. 1550–1632), was a German pharmacist.

Born Maria Moser in Herrenberg and raised by her grandmother, who ran a small infirmary in her home. In 1576, she married a pastor, Johannes Andreae, and they had eight children. Her husband was the son of theologian Jakob Andreae and the couple were related to the Leyser and Osiander families through Jakob’s sister Margarethe.

She was widowed in 1601. In 1606, she was appointed Pharmacist of the Württemberg court by the duchess of Württemberg, Sibylla of Anhalt in succession to Helena Magenbuch. This was a very uncommon position for a woman at the time. By 1607, she took over the management of the court pharmacy in Stuttgart.

Due to her healing work, she was known as ‘Mother of the Land’; she also wrote a book on medicinal herbs.

She retired in 1617.

Her son, the theologian Johannes Valentinus Andreae, wrote her biography. Another son also worked in the area of alchemy.
