= Catherine of Brandenburg-Küstrin =

Daughter of Margrave John of Küstrin

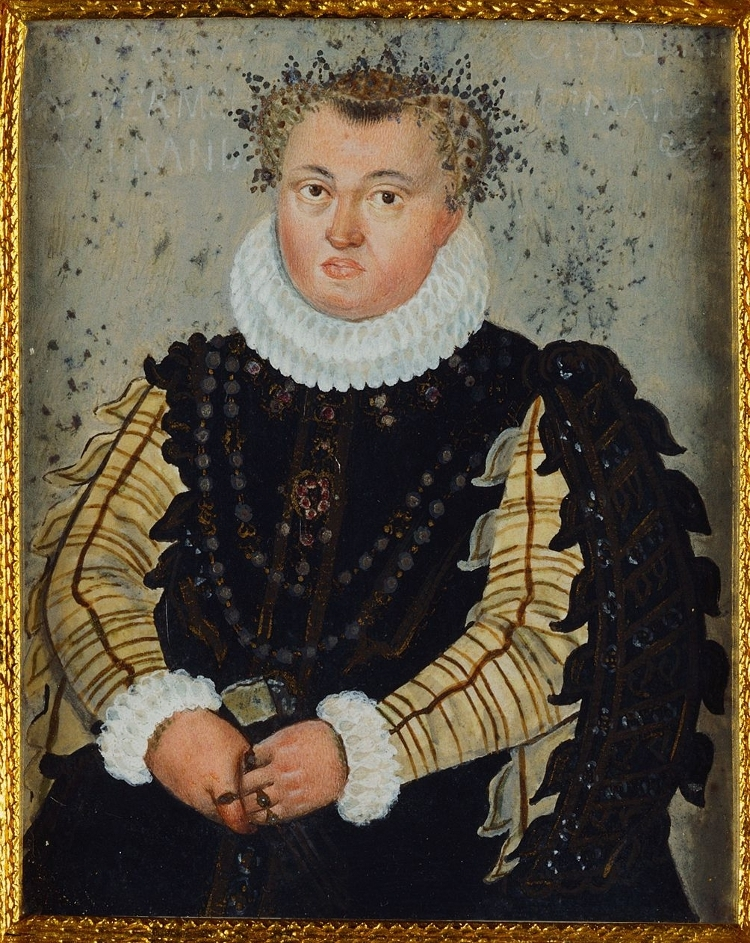
- Born: 10 August 1549; Küstrin, Margraviate of Brandenburg-Küstrin, Holy Roman Empire
- Died: 30 September 1602 (aged 53); Cölln, Berlin. Margraviate of Brandenburg, Holy Roman Empire
- Spouse: Joachim Frederick, Elector of Brandenburg (m. 1570)
- Issue: John Sigismund, Elector of Brandenburg; Anne Catherine, Queen of Denmark and Norway; Johann Georg of Brandenburg; August of Brandenburg; Albert Frederick of Brandenburg; Joachim of Brandenburg; Ernest of Brandenburg; Barbara Sophie, Duchess of Württemberg; Christian William of Brandenburg
- House: Hohenzollern
- Father: John, Margrave of Brandenburg-Küstrin
- Mother: Catherine of Brunswick-Wolfenbüttel, Margravine of Brandenburg-Küstrin
- Religion: Lutheran

Catherine of Brandenburg-Küstrin (German: Katharina von Brandenburg-Küstrin) (10 August 1549 – 30 September 1602) was a Margravine of Brandenburg-Küstrin by birth and Electress of Brandenburg by marriage.

== Life ==
Catherine was the younger of two daughters of John, Margrave of Brandenburg-Küstrin (1513–1571) from his marriage to Catherine (1518–1574), daughter of Henry II, Duke of Brunswick-Wolfenbüttel.

On 8 January 1570, she married Joachim of Brandenburg, later Elector Joachim III Frederick of Brandenburg (1546–1608) in Küstrin. Due to the marriage, her husband no longer had a legitimate claim on the position of bishop of the Catholic Archdiocese of Magdeburg and Pope Pius V put in a request to Emperor Maximilian for his dismissal.

Catherine tried to improve the fate of the poor and the needy. She built a dairy in Wedding and sold its produce on the Molkenmarkt ("Milk Market"), a square in Berlin. She used the proceeds to finance a pharmacy in the Stadtschloss that provided medicine free of charge to those in need.

Catherine died on 30 September 1602. On 13 October, she was buried in the Hohenzollern crypt (now part of the Berliner Dom).

== Descendants ==
From her marriage with Joachim Frederick, Catherine had 11 children:

- John Sigismund, Elector of Brandenburg (8 November 1572 – 23 December 1619), Elector of Brandenburg

married in 1594 Princess Anna of Prussia (1576–1625)

- Anne Catherine (26 June 1575 – 29 March 1612)

married King Christian IV of Denmark (1577–1648)

- Daughter (1576–1576)
- John George, Duke of Jägerndorf (16 December 1577 – 2 March 1624)

married Eva Christina of Württemberg (1590 - 1657), daughter of Frederick I, Duke of Württemberg and Sibylla of Anhalt

- August Frederick (16 February 1580 – 23 April 1601)
- Albert Frederick (29 April 1582 – 3 December 1600)
- Joachim (13 April 1583 – 10 June 1600)
- Ernest (13 April 1583 – 18 September 1613)
- Barbara Sophie (16 November 1584 – 13 February 1636)

married in 1609 Duke John Frederick of Württemberg (1582–1628)

- Daughter (1585 – 1586)
- Christian William (28 August 1587 – 1 January 1665) Archbishop and later Administrator of Magdeburg

married firstly, in 1615, Princess Dorothea of Brunswick-Wolfenbüttel (1596–1643)
married secondly, in 1650, Countess Barbara Eusebia of Martinice (d. 1656)
married thirdly, in 1657, Countess Maximiliane of Salm-Neuburg (1608–1663)

== References and sources ==
- Dieter Brozat (1985), Der Berliner Dom und die Hohenzollerngruft, Berlin: Haude und Spener, ISBN 3-7759-0271-6
- Ernst Daniel Martin Kirchner: Die Kurfürstinnen und Königinnen auf dem Throne der Hohenzollern, part 2: Die letzten acht Kurfürstinnen, Berlin, 1867, pp. 68–106.
- Ludwig Hahn: Geschichte des preussischen Vaterlandes, W. Hertz, 1858, p. 132
- Adolf Müller: Preußens Ehrenspiegel, Gebauer, 1851, p. 65

== Footnotes ==
Catherine of Brandenburg-Küstrin House of Hohenzollern Born: 10 August 1549 Died: 30 September 1602
German nobility
Preceded by Elisabeth of Anhalt-Zerbst	Electress consort of Brandenburg; 8 January 1598 – 30 September 1602	Vacant Title next held by Eleanor of Prussia
