= Helena Magenbuch =

German pharmacist

- Born: May 14, 1523; Nuremberg, Germany
- Died: September 9, 1597 (aged 74); Hohenacker, Germany
- Occupation: Pharmacist
- Spouses: Andreas Osiander; Johannes Rucker
- Father: Johann Magenbuch

Helena Magenbuch (born 14 March 1523 in Nuremberg; died 9 September 1597 in Hohenacker), was a German pharmacist.

She was the daughter of Johann Magenbuch, the personal physician of Martin Luther and Emperor Charles V. She was appointed scientific adviser to the duchess of Württemberg, Sibylla of Anhalt. She was awarded the title Pharmacist of the Württemberg court. This was a very uncommon position for a woman in this time period. She was succeeded by another woman, Maria Andreae.
