= George II of Württemberg-Montbéliard =

George II, Duke of Württemberg-Montbéliard
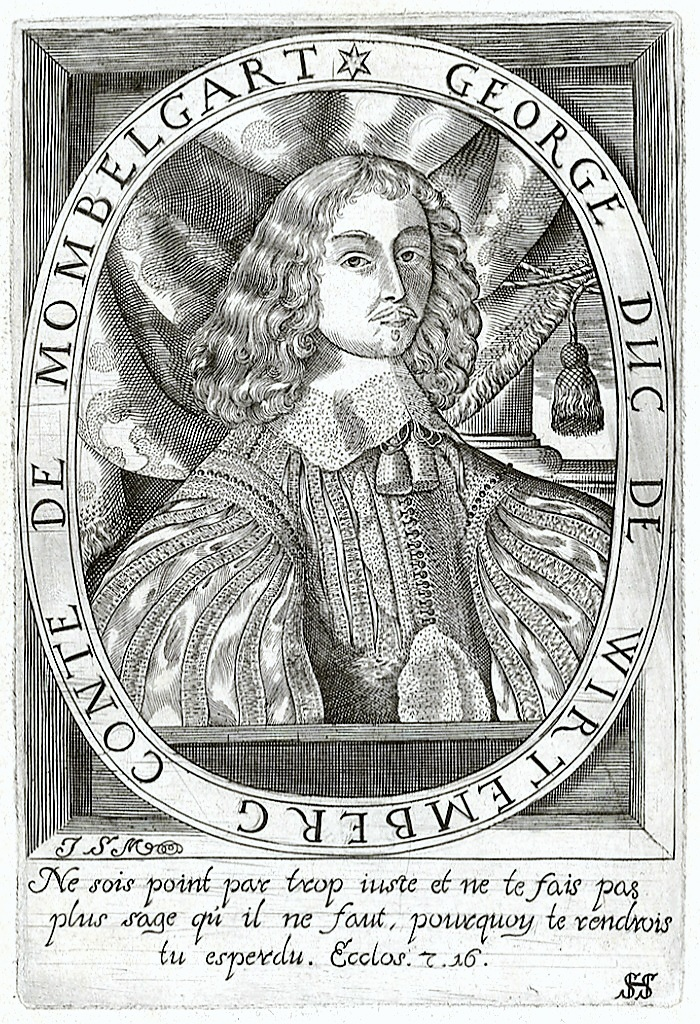
- Born: 5 October 1626; Montbéliard
- Died: 1 June 1699 (aged 72); Montbéliard
- Spouse: Anne de Coligny
- House: House of Württemberg
- Father: Louis Frederick, Duke of Württemberg-Montbéliard
- Mother: Anna Eleanor of Nassau-Weilburg-Saarbrücken

Duke George II of Württemberg-Montbéliard (5 October 1626 – 1 June 1699) was Duke of Württemberg-Montbéliard from 1662 until his death.

== Early life ==
George II was a son of the Duke Louis Frederick of Württemberg-Montbéliard (1586–1631) from his second marriage to Anna Eleanor (1602–1685), daughter of Count John Casimir of Nassau-Gleiberg (1577–1602). He succeeded his older brother Leopold Frederick as Duke of Württemberg-Montbéliard in 1662.

== Career ==
Montbéliard was occupied in 1676 by French troops. King Louis XIV was trying to conquer all Württemberg possessions on the left bank of the Rhine. George fled the county. In 1684, he was given an opportunity to return, under the condition that he recognized the King of France as his liege lord. He refused, and Württemberg-Montbéliard was administered by his cousin Frederick Charles, Duke of Württemberg-Winnental until 1698.

After Frederick Charles died in 1698, George II returned to Montbéliard, where he died a year later.

== Personal life ==
On 9 March 1648 in Montbéliard, George was married to Anne de Coligny (1624–1680), daughter of Gaspard III de Coligny, Duc de Châtillon. Together, they were the parents of the following children:

- Otto Frederick of Württemberg-Montbéliard (1650–1653), who died young.
- Henrietta of Württemberg-Montbéliard (1654–1680)
- Eleonore Charlotte of Württemberg-Montbéliard (1656–1743), who married Duke Silvius II Frederick of Württemberg-Oels in 1672.
- Conrad Louis of Württemberg-Montbéliard (1658–1659), who died young.
- Anna of Württemberg-Montbéliard (1660–1733)
- Elizabeth of Württemberg-Montbéliard (1665–1726), who married Duke Frederick Ferdinand von Württemberg-Weiltingen, a grandson of Julius Frederick, Duke of Württemberg-Weiltingen, in 1689.
- Hedwig of Württemberg-Montbéliard (1667–1715)
- Leopold Eberhard of Württemberg-Montbéliard (1670–1723), who married Anna Sabine Hedwig, Countess of Sponeck, in 1695. They divorced in 1714 and he married Charlotte Elizabeth Curie, Baroness of L'Esperance, in 1718.

George II died on 1 June 1699 in Montbéliard and was succeeded by his only surviving son, Leopold.

George II of Württemberg-Montbéliard House of Württemberg Born: 5 October 1626 Died: 1 June 1699
Preceded by Leopold Frederick	Duke of Württemberg-Montbéliard; 1662–1699	Succeeded by Leopold Eberhard
