= Sibylle Elisabeth of Württemberg =

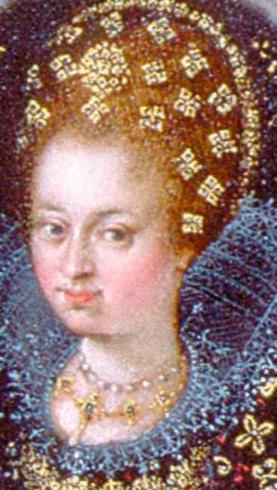

Sibylle Elisabeth of Württemberg (10 April 1584–20 January 1606), was a princess from the Holy Roman Empire, a member of the House of Württemberg and by marriage Duchess of Saxony.

Born in Mömpelgard, she was the third of fifteen children born from the marriage of Duke Frederick I of Württemberg and Sibylla, daughter of Prince Joachim Ernest, Prince of Anhalt.

== Life ==
Duke Frederick I sought the connection to the House of Saxony and searched for a match for Sybille Elisabeth (his eldest daughter) among the Protestant princes who were allies of the German Empire and were supportive of his quest for formal vassal ties to the House of Habsburg.

She married John George I, Elector of Saxony on 16 September 1604. As wittum, she was given the castle, city, and jurisdiction of Weißensee. The couple were granted a separate court which was mainly financed with revenue from the Bishopric of Merseburg.

Known for providing free medicines to the needy, Sybille Elisabeth suddenly died aged 21 in Dresden after the birth of her only child, a stillborn son. She was buried in Freiburg Cathedral (also known as St Mary's Cathedral).
