= Osiander family =

Osiander was the name of a family of German Lutheran scholars and theologians:

- Andreas Osiander (1498–1552), protestant reformer
- Lucas Osiander the Elder (1534–1604), son of Andreas Osiander, theologian
- Andreas Osiander II (1562–1617), eldest son of Lucas Osiander the Elder, professor of theology, abbot of Adelberg
- Lucas Osiander the Younger (1571–1638), son of Lucas Osiander the Elder, superintendent, abbot of Bebenhausen, chancellor of the University of Tübingen
- Johann Adam Osiander (1622–1697), nephew of the two next preceding, professor of theology, chancellor of the University of Tübingen
- Johannes Osiander (1657–1724), son of Johann Adam Osiander, professor, abbot of Königsbronn, abbot of Hirsau, director of the consistorium
- Johann Rudolf Osiander (1689–1725), son of Johannes Osiander, professor of theology
- Johann Ernst Osiander (1792–1870), Biblical scholar
