= Julius Frederick, Duke of Württemberg-Weiltingen =

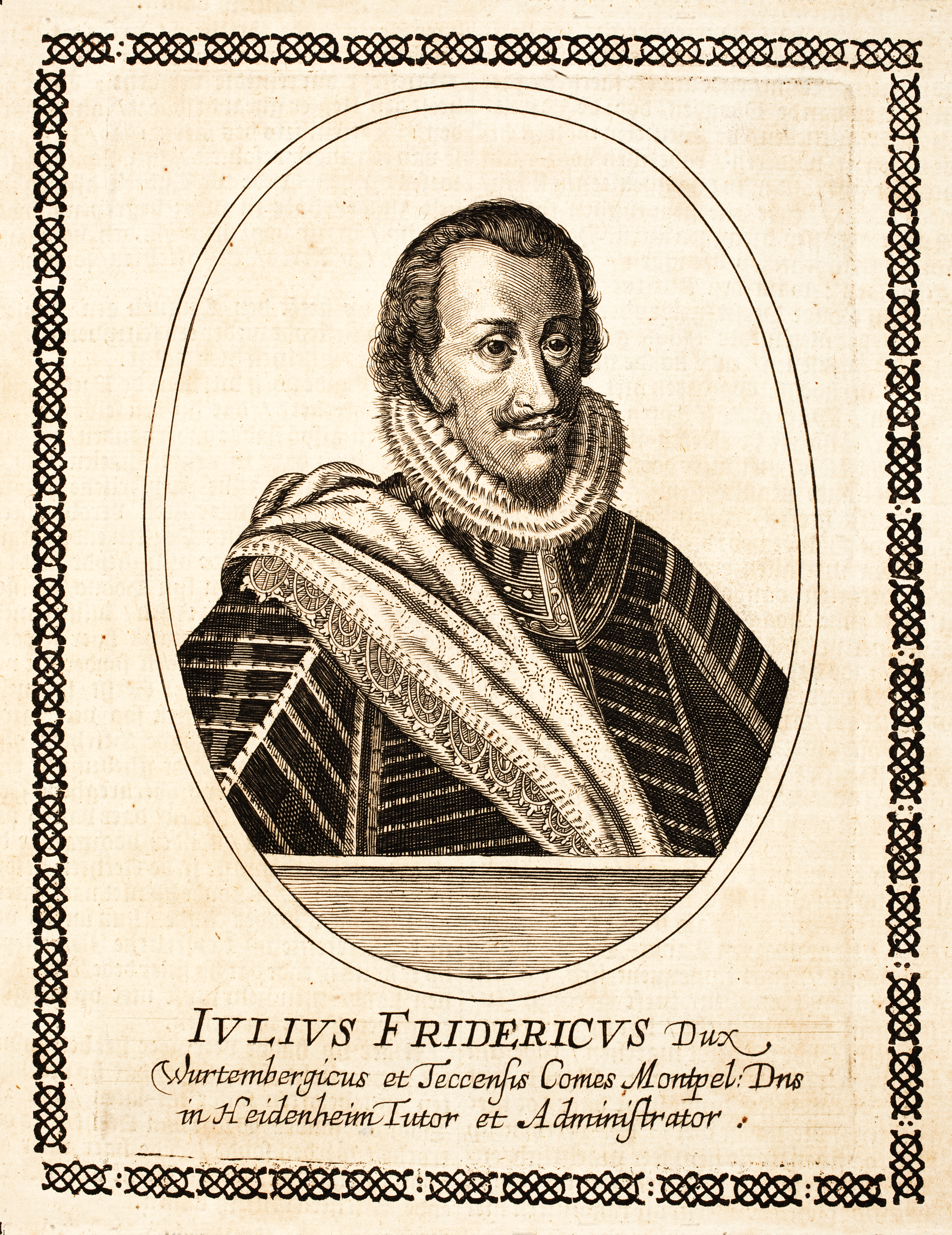
- Born: 3 June 1588; Montbéliard
- Died: 25 April 1635 (aged 46); Strasbourg
- Spouse: Anna Sabina von Schleswig-Holstein-Sonderburg
- House: House of Württemberg
- Father: Frederick I, Duke of Württemberg
- Mother: Sibylla of Anhalt

Duke Julius Frederick of Württemberg-Weiltingen (3 June 1588 in Montbéliard – 25 April 1635 in Strasbourg), was the first duke of Württemberg-Weiltingen.

== Early life ==
Born into the House of Württemberg, Julius Frederick was the third son of Frederick I, Duke of Württemberg and his wife, Sibylla of Anhalt.

== Biography ==
He grew up with his parents and siblings in Mömpelgard. After his father took up government of Württemberg in 1593, Julius Frederick lived in Stuttgart. He participated in military operations in the Alsace and in the War of the Jülich Succession. He travelled extensively, including journeys to Asia Minor, Malta, and Ephesus, and, in 1615, to Lapland.

On 28 May 1617, he was awarded the Lordships of Weiltingen and Brenz an der Brenz and a share of Heidenheim plus an annual allowance of 15000guilders. He chose Weiltingen as his residence.

In 1631, he led the regency for his nephew Eberhard III. That same year, he joined the League of Leipzig. After the bloodless Cherry War later that year, he had to leave the League under the terms of the Peace of Tübingen. When King Gustavus Adolphus of Sweden advanced into southern Germany, he raised troops again and joined Gustavus Adolphus. This led to a dispute with the Government, the Estates, and his co-regent (Barbara Sophie of Brandenburg, the mother of Eberhard III).

In 1633, he renounced the regency in Württemberg. After the Battle of Nördlingen, the whole ducal family, including Julius Frederick, fled to Strasbourg, where he died the following year.

== Personal life ==
On 24 November 1617, he was engaged to Princess Anna Sabine von Schleswig-Holstein-Sonderburg, daughter of John II, Duke of Schleswig-Holstein-Sonderburg and his second wife, Princess Agnes Hedwig of Anhalt. They were married on 11 December 1618 in Sønderborg. After the marriage, they lived in Brenz an der Brenz for a while, then moved to Weiltingen. They had:

- Roderick (1618–1651), Duke of Württemberg-Weiltingen
- Julia Felicitas (1619–1661)

married in 1640 with Duke John X of Schleswig-Holstein-Gottorp (1606–1655)

- Silvius I Nimrod (1622–1654), Duke of Württemberg-Oels

married in 1647 with Duchess Elisabeth Marie of Münsterberg-Oels (1625–1686)

- Floriana Ernestine (1623–1672)

married in 1657 with Count Frederick Kraft of Hohenlohe-Pfedelbach (1623–1681)

- Faustina Marianna (1624–1679)
- Manfred I (1626–1662), Duke of Württemberg-Weiltingen

married in 1652 with Countess Juliane of Oldenburg-Delmenhorst (1615–1691) and had issue:
- Duke Frederick Ferdinand von Württemberg-Weitlingen (1654–1705)

married Elizabeth (1665–1726), daughter of George II, Duke of Württemberg-Montbéliard, and had issue:
- Sibylle Charlotte (1690–1735)

married Charles Frederick II, Duke of Württemberg-Oels

- Hedwig Friederike (1691–1752)

married John Augustus, Prince of Anhalt-Zerbst

- Julius Peregrinatius (1627–1645)
- Sueno Martialis Edenolph (1629–1656)
- Amadea Fredonia (1631–1633)
