= John Frederick, Duke of Württemberg =

Duke of Württemberg from 1608 to 1628

John Frederick
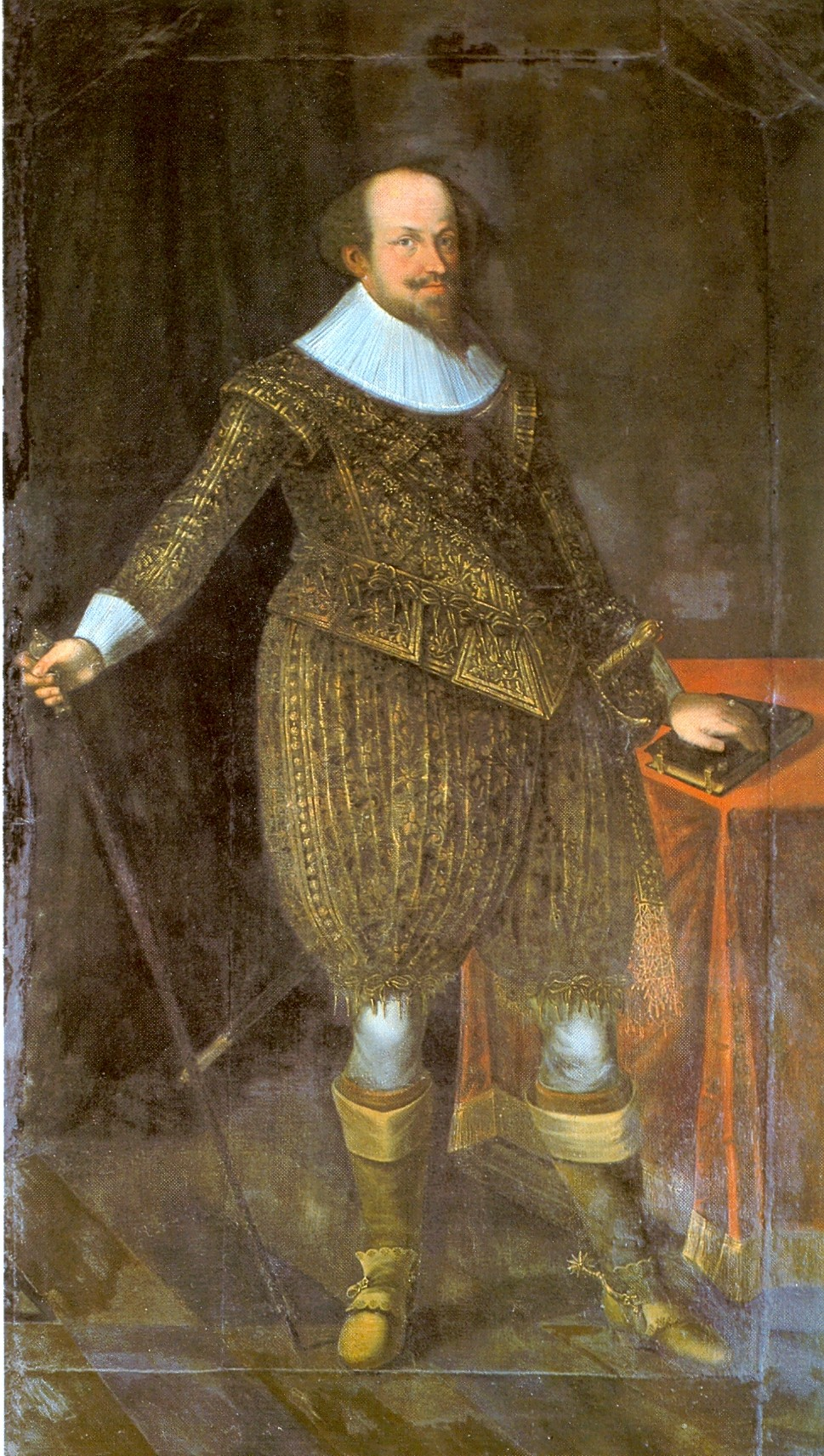
- John Frederick, 17th century

Duke of Württemberg
- Reign: 29 January 1608 – 18 July 1628
- Predecessor: Frederick I
- Successor: Eberhard III
- Born: 5 May 1582; Montbéliard castle
- Died: 18 July 1628 (aged 46) en route to Heidenheim
- Spouse: Barbara Sophie of Brandenburg (m. 1609)
- Issue among others…: Antonia of Württemberg; Eberhard III, Duke of Württemberg; Frederick, Duke of Württemberg-Neuenstadt
- House: Württemberg
- Father: Frederick I, Duke of Württemberg
- Mother: Sibylla of Anhalt

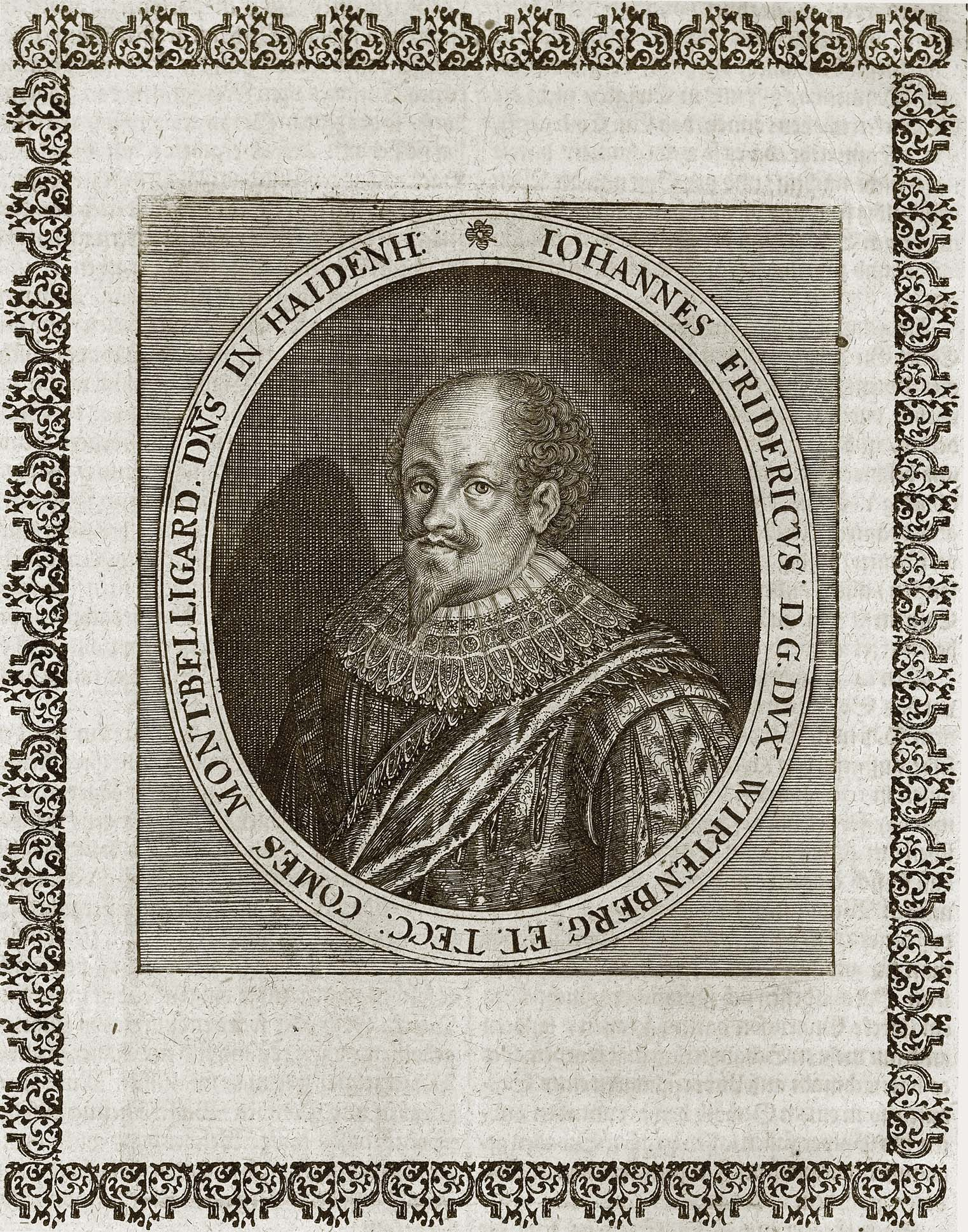
Copperplate portrait of John Frederick taken from Matthäus Merian' Theatrum Europaeum of 1662

John Frederick of Württemberg (5 May 1582, in Montbéliard – 18 July 1628) was the Duke of Württemberg from 4 February 1608 until his death on 18 July 1628 whilst en route to Heidenheim.

== Life ==
John Frederick of Württemberg was the eldest son of Frederick I and Sibylla of Anhalt. He was born in Montbéliard castle which he left at the age of four when his family moved its residence to Stuttgart.

John Frederick married Barbara Sophie of Brandenburg (16 November 1584 – 13 February 1636), daughter of Joachim Frederick, Elector of Brandenburg. To commemorate his marriage on 5 November 1609, he had Castle Urach converted, turning its "golden room" into one of the finest surviving examples of renaissance banqueting halls in Germany.

John Frederick was a well-meaning, peace-loving ruler but he displayed a number of personal weaknesses and was often ill-equipped to deal with the challenges of the era. Despite this he restored the constitution (which had been suspended by his father, Frederick I, subject to changes that were never implemented). He also restored the power of the councils of Duke Louis (which had been abolished by Frederick I). Most importantly, he had Frederick’s powerful chancellor Matthäus Enzlin condemned to a fortress for life for embezzlement and extortion, subjecting him later to trial on a count of high treason for which he was executed on the market place in Urach in 1613. He achieved little improvement in the state of affairs within the ducal household, however. In fact the duchy ran into further debt leading to unruly debate within the family and even the ranks of servants and eventually problems with the mint.

John Frederick continued the long-standing negotiations held by his father with other evangelical princes, resulting in talks in Auhausen near Nördlingen in May 1608 and the subsequent signing of the Union of Auhausen. In 1621 he moved with a Unionist army into the Palatinate region, although the alliance crumbled in the same year with little to show for its efforts.

Duke John Frederick continued to swear allegiance to the union. At the battle of Wimpfen (26 April 1622), Georg Friedrich, Margrave of Baden-Durlach, was defeated by Marshall Tilly and the duke’s youngest brother fell in battle. Despite a neutrality accord, the victors of this battle went on to sack the north western areas of the Duke's region and in the years that followed it suffered repeatedly under harmful raids and settlement.

On 28 May 1617, John Frederick entered into an agreement with a number of his many brothers; the eldest of his youngest brothers, Louis Frederick was given the county of Montbéliard – still not totally independent of the Duchy of Württemberg. The next brother, Julius Frederick inherited recently acquired sovereignty over Brenz and Weiltingen, leading to two new branch lines in the Duchy; the younger line of Württemberg-Mömpelgard (which died out in 1723) and Württemberg-Weiltingen (which died out in 1792). His other brothers, Frederick Achilles and Magnus inherited the castles of Neuenstadt and Neuenbürg respectively. As both of the latter brothers were unmarried when they died their possessions were subsequently brought back into the main line of the Duchy.

== Marriage and issues ==
John Frederick and his wife had the following children:

- Duchess Henriette of Württemberg-Stuttgart (12 December 1610 – 18 February 1623)
- Duke Frederick of Württemberg-Stuttgart (15 March 1612 – 12 June 1612)
- Duchess Antonia of Württemberg (24 March 1613 – 1 October 1679)
- Eberhard III, Duke of Württemberg (16 December 1614 – 2 July 1674)
- Frederick, Duke of Württemberg-Neuenstadt (19 December 1615 – 24 March 1682)
- Ulrich of Württemberg-Neuenbürg (15 May 1617 – 5 December 1671)
- Duchess Anna Johanna of Württemberg-Stuttgart (13 March 1619 – 5 March 1679)
- Duchess Sibylle of Württemberg-Stuttgart (4 December 1620 – 21 May 1707); she married her cousin Leopold Frederick, Duke of Württemberg-Montbéliard
- Duke Eberthal of Württemberg-Stuttgart (4 September 1623 – 9 January 1624)

== Ancestors ==
Ancestors of John Frederick, Duke of Württemberg

8. Henry, Count of Württemberg
4. George I of Württemberg-Mömpelgard
9. Eva of Salm
2. Frederick I, Duke of Württemberg
10. Philip I, Landgrave of Hesse
5. Barbara of Hesse
11. Christine of Saxony
1. John Frederick, Duke of Württemberg
12. John V, Prince of Anhalt-Zerbst
6. Joachim Ernest, Prince of Anhalt
13. Margaret of Brandenburg
3. Sibylla of Anhalt
14. Wolfgang I, Count of Barby-Mühlingen
7. Agnes of Barby-Mühlingen
15. Agnes of Mansfeld-Mittelort

John Frederick, Duke of Württemberg House of Württemberg Born: 5 May 1582 Died: 18 July 1628
Regnal titles
Preceded by Frederick I	Duke of Württemberg; 1608–1628	Succeeded by Eberhard III as Duke of Württemberg
Preceded by Frederick I	Duke of Württemberg; 1608–1628	Succeeded by Louis Frederick as Duke of Württemberg-Montbéliard
Preceded by Frederick I	Duke of Württemberg; 1608–1628	Succeeded by Julius Frederick as Duke of Württemberg-Weiltingen
