= Frederick Achilles, Duke of Württemberg-Neuenstadt =

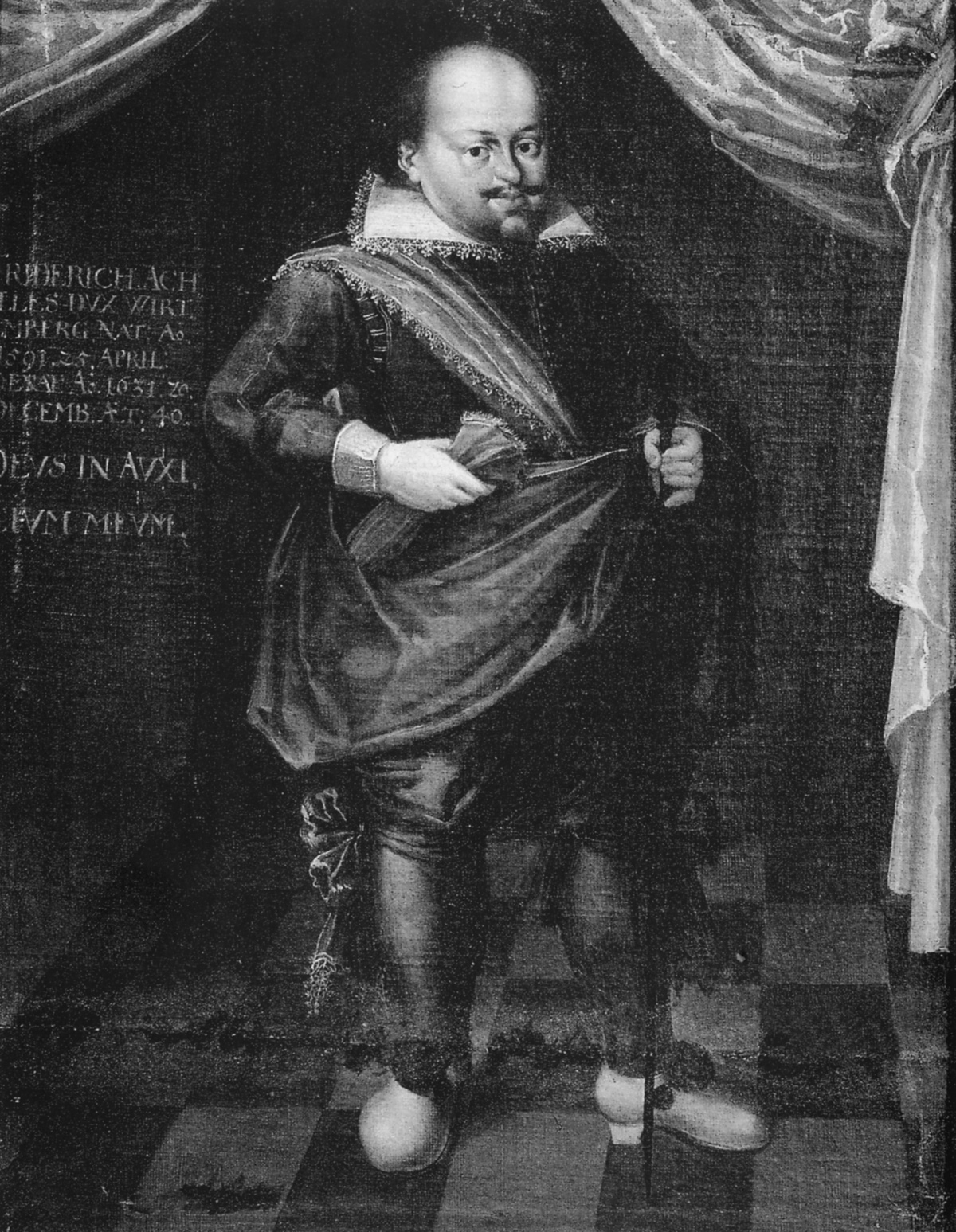
Portrait, before 1631

Frederick Achilles (5 May 1591 – 30 December 1631) was the first Duke of Württemberg-Neuenstadt from 1617 until his death in 1631.

The Duchy of Württemberg-Neuenstadt was a branch line of the ducal House of Württemberg in the 17th and 18th centuries named after the town of residence, Neuenstadt.

Duke Frederick Achilles (German: Friedrich Achilles) was the second youngest son of Duke Frederick I. Following a Fürstbrüderlicher Vergleich – a mutual agreement made between ducal brothers on 7 June 1617 (Julian calendar: 28 May), the sons of Frederick I split the inheritance such that the eldest son, Johann Frederick, assumed rule of the Duchy of Württemberg while his remaining brothers assumed possession of other ducal properties.

Under the arrangement Frederick Achilles, then 26, was bequeathed Neuenstadt Castle and an annual endowment of 10,000 guilder. Frederick Achilles never married so after his death in 1631 the castle returned to the main line of the duchy before the Duchy of Württemberg-Neuenstadt was reinstated in 1649 under Duke Frederick.

Frederick Achilles, Duke of Württemberg-Neuenstadt Duke of Württemberg-Neuenstadt Born: 5 May 1591 Died: 30 December 1631
German nobility
New creation	Duke of Württemberg-Neuenstadt; 1617 – 1631	Vacant Title next held by Frederick
