= Louis Frederick, Duke of Württemberg-Montbéliard =

Louis Frederick
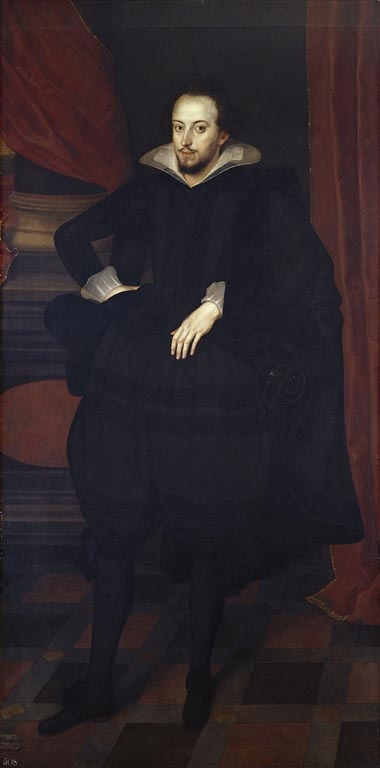
- 1608 portrait
- Born: 29 January 1586; Montbéliard
- Died: 26 January 1631 (aged 44); Montbéliard
- Spouse: Elisabeth Magdalena of Hesse-Darmstadt; Anna Eleonora of Nassau-Weilburg-Saarbrücken
- House: House of Württemberg
- Father: Frederick I, Duke of Württemberg
- Mother: Sibylla of Anhalt

Louis Frederick of Württemberg-Montbéliard (29 January 1586 in Montbéliard – 26 January 1631 in Montbéliard) was the founder of a cadet line of the House of Württemberg known as the Dukes of Württemberg-Montbéliard.

Louis Frederick of Württemberg was born at Montbéliard Castle as the fifth child and second son of Duke Frederick I of Württemberg, and princess Sibylla of Anhalt.

== Life ==
In 1608, Louis Frederick came to England with Benjamin von Buwinckhausen to return his father's insignia of the Order of the Garter and visited Scotland, where he was hosted by Andrew Melville of Garvock. He was in England again in 1610 on a diplomatic mission.

On 28 May 1617, Louis Frederick agreed with older brother Duke John Frederick to divide the Württemberg possessions. Louis Frederick received the possessions on the left bank of the Rhine (Montbéliard, Riquewihr and Horburg) with full sovereignty. Thus, Louis Frederick became the founder of the younger Württemberg-Montbéliard line.

During the Thirty Years' War, his territory suffered badly from starvation and the plague. After his brother John Frederick died on 28 July 1628, Louis Frederick moved to Stuttgart, to act as guardian and regent for his fourteen-year-old cousin Eberhard III. His tenure as regent was dominated by conflicts with Emperor Ferdinand II, after Württemberg lost about a third of its territory due to the Edict of Restitution. In November 1630, Louis Frederick returned to Montbéliard, where he died on 26 January 1631.

== Marriage and issue ==
Louis Frederick married on 14 July 1617 with Elisabeth Magdalena of Hesse-Darmstadt, daughter of Louis V, Landgrave of Hesse-Darmstadt. The marriage produced three children:

- Christopher (24 December 1620 – 1 January 1621)
- Henriette Louise (20 June 1623 – 24 August 1650) married on 21 August 1642 with Margrave Albert II of Brandenburg-Ansbach
- Leopold Frederick (30 May 1624 – 15 June 1662), his successor

After Elisabeth Magdalena's death in 1624, Louis Frederick married on 15 May 1625 with Anna Eleonora, daughter of Count John Casimir of Nassau-Weilburg. This marriage also produced three children:

- George II (5 October 1626 – 1 June 1699)
- Henry (19 December 1627 – January 1628)
- Georgia Ludovica (1 February 1630 – 11 April 1630)

Louis Frederick, Duke of Württemberg-Montbéliard House of Württemberg Born: 29 January 1586 Died: 26 January 1631
Preceded by John Frederick as Duke of Württemberg	Duke of Württemberg-Montbéliard; 1617-1631	Succeeded by Leopold Frederick
