= Leopold Frederick, Duke of Württemberg-Montbéliard =

- Born: 30 May 1624; Montbéliard
- Died: 15 June 1662 (aged 38); Montbéliard
- Noble family: Württemberg
- Spouse: Sibylle of Württemberg
- Father: Louis Frederick, Duke of Württemberg-Montbéliard
- Mother: Elisabeth Magdalena of Hesse-Darmstadt

Leopold Frederick (30 May 1624 – 15 June 1662) was Duke of Montbéliard from 1631 until his death in 1662. He was born in Montbéliard to Duke Louis Frederick and his first wife, Elisabeth Magdalena of Hesse-Darmstadt. He succeeded his father in 1631 at the age of seven.

He married Sibylle, the youngest daughter of Duke John Frederick of Württemberg. The marriage remained childless.

He died in 1662 and was succeeded by his half-brother George II.

Leopold Frederick, Duke of Württemberg-Montbéliard House of Württemberg Born: 30 May 1624 Died: 15 June 1662
Preceded by Louis Frederick	Duke of Württemberg-Montbéliard; 1631-1662	Succeeded by George II
