= Barbara of Hesse =

German noblewoman

- Duchess of Württemberg-Mömpelgard; Countess of Waldeck
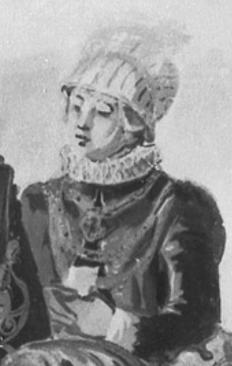
- Born: 8 April 1536; Kassel, Hessen, Germany
- Died: 8 June 1597 (aged 61); Schloss Waldeck
- Spouse: George I of Württemberg-Mömpelgard (m. 1555; died 1558) Daniel, Count of Waldeck (m. 1568; died 1577)
- Issue: Ulrich; Frederick I, Duke of Württemberg; Eva Christina
- House: Hesse
- Father: Philip I, Landgrave of Hesse
- Mother: Christine of Saxony

Barbara of Hesse, Duchess of Württemberg-Mömpelgard (8 April 1536 – 8 June 1597) was a German noblewoman and the wife of Count George I of Württemberg-Mömpelgard. Her second husband was Daniel, Count of Waldeck.

== Family ==
Barbara was born in Kassel, Hessen on 8 April 1536, one of the ten children of Philip I, Landgrave of Hesse and his legitimate wife Christine of Saxony. She had four sisters and five brothers including George I, Landgrave of Hesse-Darmstadt. Her father was a leading champion of the Protestant Reformation. While married to her mother, he also married bigamously his morganatic wife, Margarethe von der Saale, by whom he had another nine children.

Her paternal grandparents were William II of Hesse and Anna of Mecklenburg-Schwerin, and her maternal grandparents were George, Duke of Saxony and Barbara Jagiellon, daughter of King Casimir IV Jagiellon of Poland and Elisabeth of Austria.

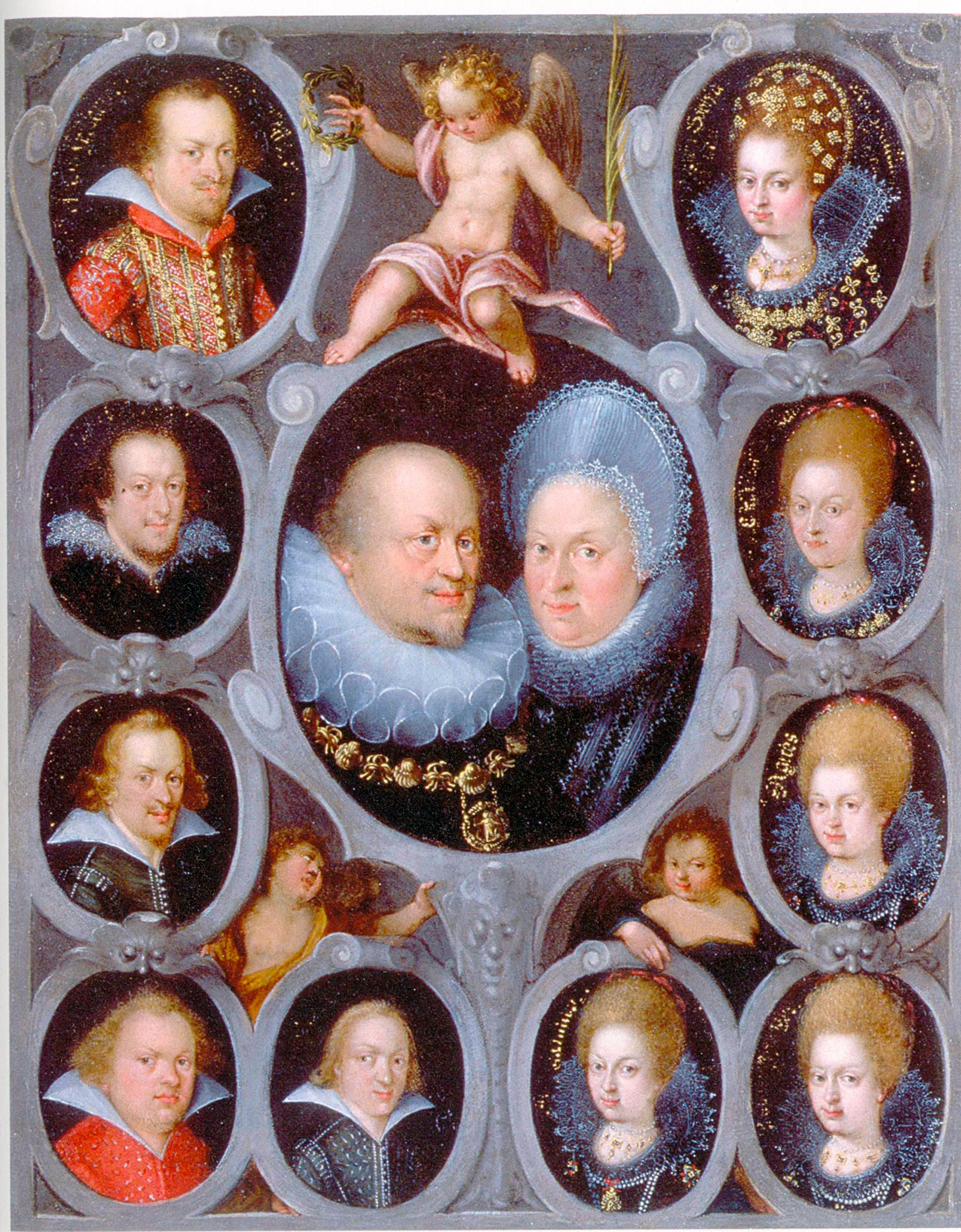
Barbara's son Frederick I, Duke of Württemberg and his family

== Marriages and issue ==
On 10 September 1555 in Reichenweier, Barbara married her first husband, George I, Count of Württemberg-Mömpelgard, son of Henry, Count of Württemberg and Eva of Salm. She was nineteen years of age and Georg was fifty-seven. They made their residence at the Chateau de Montbeliard in the principality of Mömpelgard, a staunch Lutheran enclave in France.

Together George and Barbara had one son:

- Frederick I, Duke of Württemberg (19 August 1557, Mömpelgard- 29 January 1608, Stuttgart), married Sybilla of Anhalt, by whom he had fifteen children.

Barbara was widowed on 18 July 1558 after less than three years of marriage. She married her second husband Daniel, Count of Waldeck ten years later on 11 November 1568 in Kassel, when she was thirty-two years old.

She died on 8 June 1597 at Waldeck Castle (in German). Among her numerous descendants are the current Spanish and British Royal Families.
