= Sibylla of Anhalt =

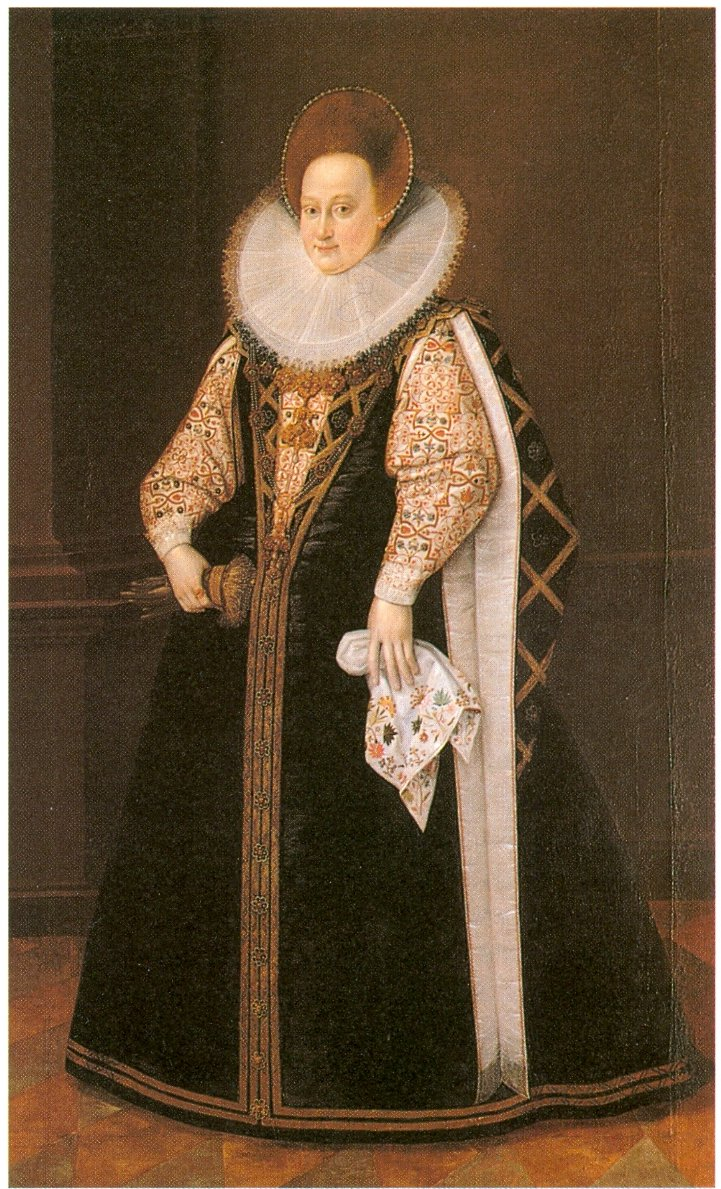

Duchess consort of Württemberg
- Tenure: 28 August 1593 - 29 January 1608
- Born: 28 September 1564; Bernburg
- Died: 26 October 1614 (aged 50); Leonberg
- Spouse: Frederick I, Duke of Württemberg (m. 1581; died 1608)
- Issue: John Frederick, Duke of Württemberg; George Frederick; Sibylle Elisabeth, Duchess of Saxony; Elisabeth; Louis Frederick, Duke of Württemberg-Montbéliard; Joachim Frederick; Julius Frederick, Duke of Württemberg-Weiltingen; Philip Frederick; Eva Christina, Duchess of Jägerndorf; Frederick Achilles, Duke of Württemberg-Neuenstadt; Agnes, Princess Francis Julius of Saxe-Lauenburg; Barbara, Margravine of Baden-Durlach; Magnus; August; Anna, Princess Ludwig Ulrich of Silesia-Jägerndorf
- House: Ascania
- Father: Joachim Ernest, Prince of Anhalt
- Mother: Agnes of Barby-Mühlingen

Sibylla of Anhalt (28 September 1564 – 26 October 1614) was a German princess from the House of Ascania who became Duchess of Württemberg as the wife of Duke Frederick I.

== Early life ==
Sibylla of Anhalt was born in Bernburg on 28 September 1564, as the fourth child of Joachim Ernest, Prince of Anhalt (1536–1586) and his first wife, Agnes of Barby-Mühlingen (1540–1569), daughter of Wolfgang I, Count of Barby-Mühlingen. She had three older sisters and two younger brothers. Sybilla lost her mother when she was five years old, and her father remarried two years later. By her stepmother, Eleonore of Württemberg (1552–1618), she had ten half-siblings.

In 1577, Sybilla's older sister Anna Maria was relieved from her post as Imperial abbess of Gernrode and Frose in order to marry Joachim Frederick of Brieg; under pressure from their father, the chapter elected the 13-year-old Sibylla as her successor. Sibylla was confirmed in her office by the emperor Rudolph II. During her reign as abbess, the only record of her activities comes from an abbey document in which she invested the widow of Stefan Molitor (the first Evangelical superintendent of the abbey) with a piece of land.

In 1581, Sibylla was relieved from her post in order to marry Frederick, Count of Mömpelgard and heir apparent of the Duchy of Württemberg. The marriage was arranged by her stepmother, Eleonore of Württemberg, and the wedding took place in Stuttgart on 22 May of that year. Her successor as abbess was her younger half-sister Agnes Hedwig. Only 17 years old at the time of her wedding, Sibylla was described as an unpretentious beauty with a vivid charm and a disposition to be generous and kind. Her natural warm friendliness was said to have contrasted to the somewhat cold nature of Frederick, although the beginning of their marriage seemed to have been loving.

== Marriage ==
Through her strict Catholic upbringing, Sibylla was raised to endure any hardship of pregnancy and marriage without complaint, and was a supportive and loyal wife. She bore her husband fifteen children during the first fifteen years of their marriage, ten of whom lived to adulthood. Her constant pregnancies drained her strength to such an extent that she was repeatedly confined to bed. After the birth of their last child, Sibylla and Frederick agreed to stop having sex so that she would not become pregnant again. Frederick succeeded his father's cousin Ludwig as Duke of Württemberg in 1593, but Sibylla did not play a prominent role in court life or have any political influence over her husband. As marital fidelity was not compatible with Frederick's view of the prerogatives of an absolutist monarch, he began extramarital affairs, which effectively ruined his relationship with Sibylla. After this, the couple virtually lived apart, and Frederick did not take Sybilla with him on his frequent travels to France, Italy, and England.

== Alchemical and Medicinal Pursuits ==
Despite contention later in their marriage, both Sibylla and Frederick shared a passionate interest in alchemy and medicine. Their castle in Württemburg included an extensive laboratory called Alte Lusthaus, which employed a team of twenty-one people by 1608. Alte Lusthaus was meticulously organized, which each employee assigned set salaries and alchemical tasks. Workers were either given the title of Laboranten, one who followed given recipes or alchemist, one who engineered the alchemical recipes themselves. Equipped with fourteen copper furnaces, four copper ovens, distillation vessels, and hundreds of pounds of metals, the Würrtemburg laboratory was a prime example of a princely alchemical hub.

Beyond her alchemical passions, which she veiled as charitable acts for the poor, Sibylla was also anxious to expand her knowledge of botany and chemistry. As Landesmutter or “Lutheran mother” to her country, she invested herself in the ducal pharmacy, distilling and purifying substances to create new drugs. In a contentious letter from Frederick, he chastised her to "pay attention to the court pharmacy," suggesting her position of knowledge. Sybilla inherited an exhaustive medical compendium from her sister-in-law Eleonore, which included hundreds of recipes and remedies. As scientific adviser, she appointed Helena Magenbuch, a daughter of Johann Magenbuch, the personal physician of Martin Luther and Emperor Charles V. Helena Magenbuch was later awarded the title of Pharmacist of the Württemberg Court.

== Later Life ==
After the death of Frederick in 1608, Sibylla withdrew to Leonberg, where she commissioned the architect Heinrich Schickhardt to develop Schloss Leonberg and create the famous Pomeranzengarten (Orange Garden) in Renaissance style. She insisted on attaching a balcony to her first floor rooms, to allow her to appreciate the nature. Spurred on by the extravagant garden, Sibylla developed the Leonberg pharmacy and employed her friend, fellow widow Maria Andreae as pharmacist. The two threw themselves into medicinal work, experimenting in the lab with everything from golden buttons to human hearts. Sibylla became a known healer for the Leonberg poor, offering care and medicinal recipes free of charge. Sibylla died unexpectedly in Leonberg in 1614. Three months after her death, an extensive inventory of her apothecary was conducted, noting scales and a set of weights, mortars and pestles, numerous oil presses, copper kettles and pans, and several metal containers for making juices. This equipment reflect's Sibylla's medicinal legacy, which was largely all in the name of charity.

== Issue ==
- Johann Frederick (1582–1628)
- George Frederick (1583–1591)
- Sibylla Elisabeth (1584–1606), who married John George I, Elector of Saxony
- Elisabeth (born and died in 1585)
- Louis Frederick (1586–1631), founder of the branch of Württemberg-Mömpelgard
- Joachim Frederick (born and died in 1587)
- Julius Frederick (1588–1635), founder of the branch of Württemberg-Weiltingen, also known as the Julian Line
- Philip Frederick (born and died in 1589)
- Eva Christina (1590–1657), who married John George of Brandenburg (1577–1624), Duke of Jägerndorf, son of Joachim Frederick, Elector of Brandenburg
- Frederick Achilles (1591–1631)
- Agnes (1592–1629), who married Francis Julius of Saxe-Lauenburg (1584–1634)
- Barbara (1593–1627), who married Margrave Frederick V of Baden-Durlach
- Magnus (1594–1622), who fell in the Battle of Wimpfen
- August (born and died in 1596)
- Anna (1597–1650)

Sibylla of Anhalt House of Ascania Born: 28 September 1564 Died: 26 October 1614
Preceded by Ursula of Pfalz-Veldenz	Duchess of Württemberg; 1593–1608	Succeeded by Barbara Sophie of Brandenburg
Preceded by Anna Maria of Anhalt	Abbess of Gernrode and Frose; 1577–1581	Succeeded by Agnes Hedwig of Anhalt
