= Frederick I, Duke of Württemberg =

Duke of Württemberg from 1593 to 1608

Frederick I
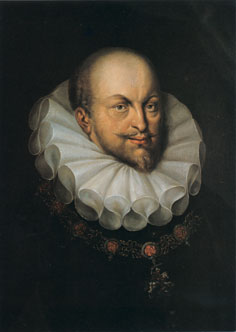
- Portrait, c. 1600–1608

Duke of Württemberg
- Reign: 28 August 1593 – 29 January 1608
- Predecessor: Louis III
- Successor: John Frederick
- Born: 19 August 1557; Mömpelgard, today's Montbéliard
- Died: 29 January 1608 (aged 50); Stuttgart
- Spouse: Sibylla of Anhalt (m. 1581)
- Issue among others: John Frederick, Duke of Württemberg; George Frederick; Sibylle Elisabeth, Duchess of Saxony; Elisabeth; Louis Frederick, Duke of Württemberg-Montbéliard; Joachim Frederick; Julius Frederick, Duke of Württemberg-Weiltingen; Philip Frederick; Eva Christina, Duchess of Jägerndorf; Frederick Achilles, Duke of Württemberg-Neuenstadt; Agnes, Princess Francis Julius of Saxe-Lauenburg; Barbara, Margravine of Baden-Durlach; Magnus; August; Anna, Princess Ludwig Ulrich of Silesia-Jägerndorf
- House: Württemberg
- Father: George I of Württemberg-Mömpelgard
- Mother: Barbara of Hesse

Friedrich I of Württemberg (19 August 1557 – 29 January 1608) was the son of George of Mömpelgard and Barbara of Hesse, daughter of Philip I, Landgrave of Hesse.

Several references are made to him in Shakespeare's The Merry Wives of Windsor, in which a series of anti-German jokes start with a horse theft, several references are made to German travellers in England and to a German duke who is not expected to come to Windsor.

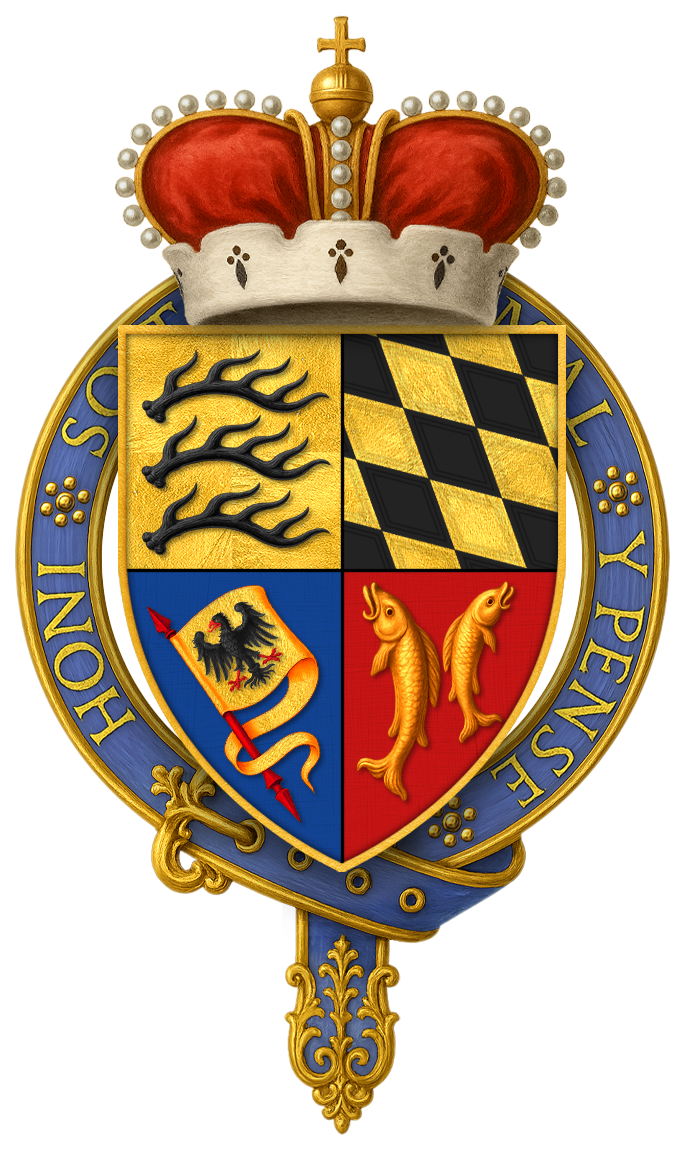
Garter-encircled Arms of Frederick I, Duke of Württemberg, KG

== Early life and education ==
Frederick of Mömpelgard was born in Mömpelgard present day Montbéliard, France, the son of George I of Württemberg-Mömpelgard of Montbéliard and his wife Barbara of Hesse, daughter of Philip I, Landgrave of Hesse.

He spent his youth at the Württemberg court in Stuttgart, where Christoph, Duke of Württemberg himself took care of his education. From 1571 to 1574 he was educated in the later Collegium Illustre in Tübingen.

== Career ==
Frederick visited various courts in Germany, Denmark, Hungary, Austria, France, Italy and England. He signed the Formula of Concord of 1577 and the Book of Concord of 1580.

In 1592, Frederick was heir apparent to the dukedom of Württemberg when he visited Windsor and other English cities. He desired to become a Knight of the Garter and repeatedly solicited Queen Elizabeth for the honor. After he had inherited the dukedom and become more prominent, she admitted him to the order. In a calculated slight, he was not informed of his admission in time to attend the investiture in spring 1597, the ceremony for which The Merry Wives of Windsor was written. Comic references to Mömpelgard's earlier visit and his absence from Windsor intended for the play's first audience, taken from the first private performance, appear in the First Folio edition of the play. These references were not included in the 1602 Quarto derived from public theatrical production.

On 4 October 1603 he was invested in the Order of the Garter by a delegation of James VI and I. Sir Robert Spencer and William Dethick brought him the insignia of the order. His councillor Benjamin von Buwinckhausen helped organise the ceremonies in the church and castle at Stuttgart. The jewels including two garters with diamonds and rubies, and two St Georges with diamonds and rubies, and a gold chain or collar, made by the London goldsmiths, John Spilman and William Herrick.

In 1599, Frederick I issued an order that a new town should be established at the northern extremity of the Black Forest by the name of Freudenstadt. The aim was for the town to become the new residence of the Duchy of Württemberg as it was closer to Mömpelgard than the Württemberg capital Stuttgart. However, Frederick I died in 1608, aged 50, in Stuttgart, and his plans never came to fruition.

== Children ==
The sons of Frederick I established the ducal house of Württemberg-Neuenstadt, a branch line of the House of Württemberg after a Fürstbrüderlicher Vergleich – a mutual agreement made between ducal brothers on 7 June 1617. The eldest son, Johann Frederick, assumed barony over the Duchy of Württemberg while the second youngest son, Frederick Achilles, was bequeathed Neuenstadt Castle and an annual endowment of 10,000 guilder.

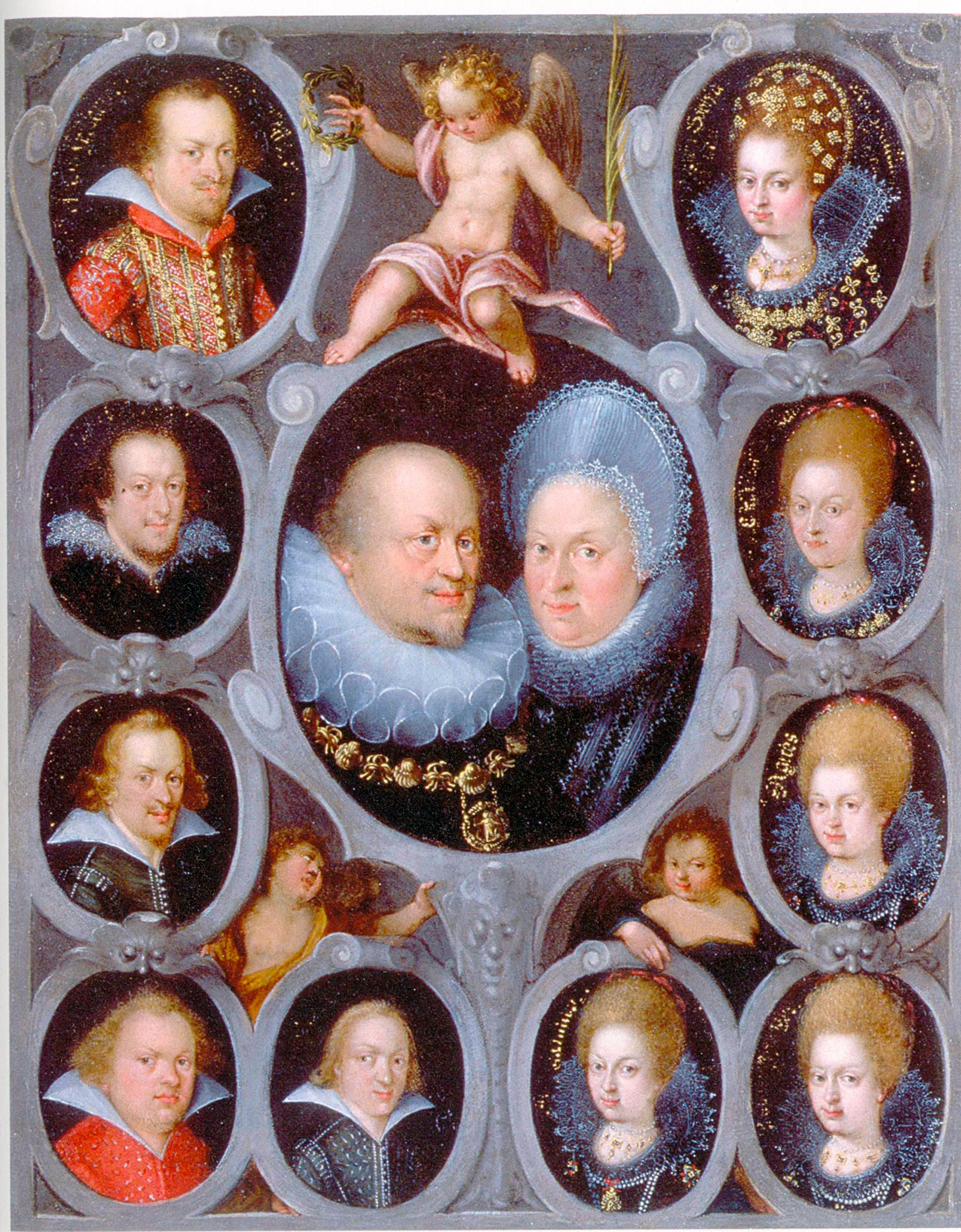
Duke Frederick I of Württemberg and Sibylla of Anhalt (centre), with their then-living 5 sons: Johann Frederick, Ludwig Frederick, Julius Frederick, Frederick Achilles and Magnus (top left downwards), and 5 daughters: Sibylla Elisabeth, Eva Christina, Agnes, Barbara and Anna (top right downwards)

Frederick and his spouse Sibylla of Anhalt, daughter of Joachim Ernst, Prince of Anhalt, had the following children:

- Johann Frederick (1582–1628)
- George Frederick (1583–1591)
- Sibylla Elisabeth (1584–1606) - married John George I, Elector of Saxony
- Elisabeth (born and died in 1585)
- Louis Frederick (1586–1631), founder of the later branch line of Württemberg-Mömpelgard
- Joachim Frederick (born and died in 1587)
- Julius Frederick (1588–1635), founder of the branch line of Württemberg-Weiltingen, also known as the Julian Line
- Philip Frederick (born and died in 1589)
- Eva Christina (1590–1657) - married John George of Brandenburg (1577–1624), Duke of Jägerndorf, son of Joachim Frederick, Elector of Brandenburg
- Frederick Achilles (1591–1631)
- Agnes (1592–1629) - married Francis Julius of Saxe-Lauenburg (1584–1634)
- Barbara of Württemberg (1593–1627) - married Margrave Frederick V of Baden-Durlach
- Magnus (de) (1594–1622), fell in the Battle of Wimpfen
- August (born and died in 1596)
- Anna (1597–1650), married Ludwig Ulrich Von Schlesien-Jägerndorf (1591-1644)

== Ancestors ==
Ancestors of Frederick I, Duke of Württemberg

8. Ulrich V, Count of Württemberg
4. Henry, Count of Württemberg
9. Elisabeth of Bavaria-Landshut
2. George I of Württemberg-Mömpelgard
10. John IV, Count of Salm-Obersalm
5. Eva of Salm
11. Margaret of Sierck
1. Frederick I, Duke of Württemberg
12. William II, Landgrave of Hesse
6. Philip I, Landgrave of Hesse
13. Anna of Mecklenburg-Schwerin
3. Barbara of Hesse
14. George, Duke of Saxony
7. Christine of Saxony
15. Barbara Jagiellon

Frederick I, Duke of Württemberg House of Württemberg Born: 19 August 1557 Died: 29 January 1608
Regnal titles
Preceded by Louis I	Duke of Württemberg; 1593–1608	Succeeded by John Frederick
