= General Lubomirski =

General Lubomirski may refer to:

- Antoni Benedykt Lubomirski (1718–1761), Polish-Lithuanian Commonwealth major general
- Jerzy Dominik Lubomirski (1654–1727), Polish-Lithuanian Commonwealth general
- Jerzy Ignacy Lubomirski (1687–1753), Polish-Lithuanian Commonwealth general
- Jerzy Marcin Lubomirski (1738–1811), Polish-Lithuanian Commonwealth major general
- Ksawery Lubomirski (1747–1819), Polish-born Imperial Russian Army general
- Michał Lubomirski (1752–1809), Polish-Lithuanian Commonwealth lieutenant general
