= Ursula Katharina Lubomirska =

Imperial Princess of Teschen (1680–1743)

Ursula Katharina
- Imperial Princess of Teschen
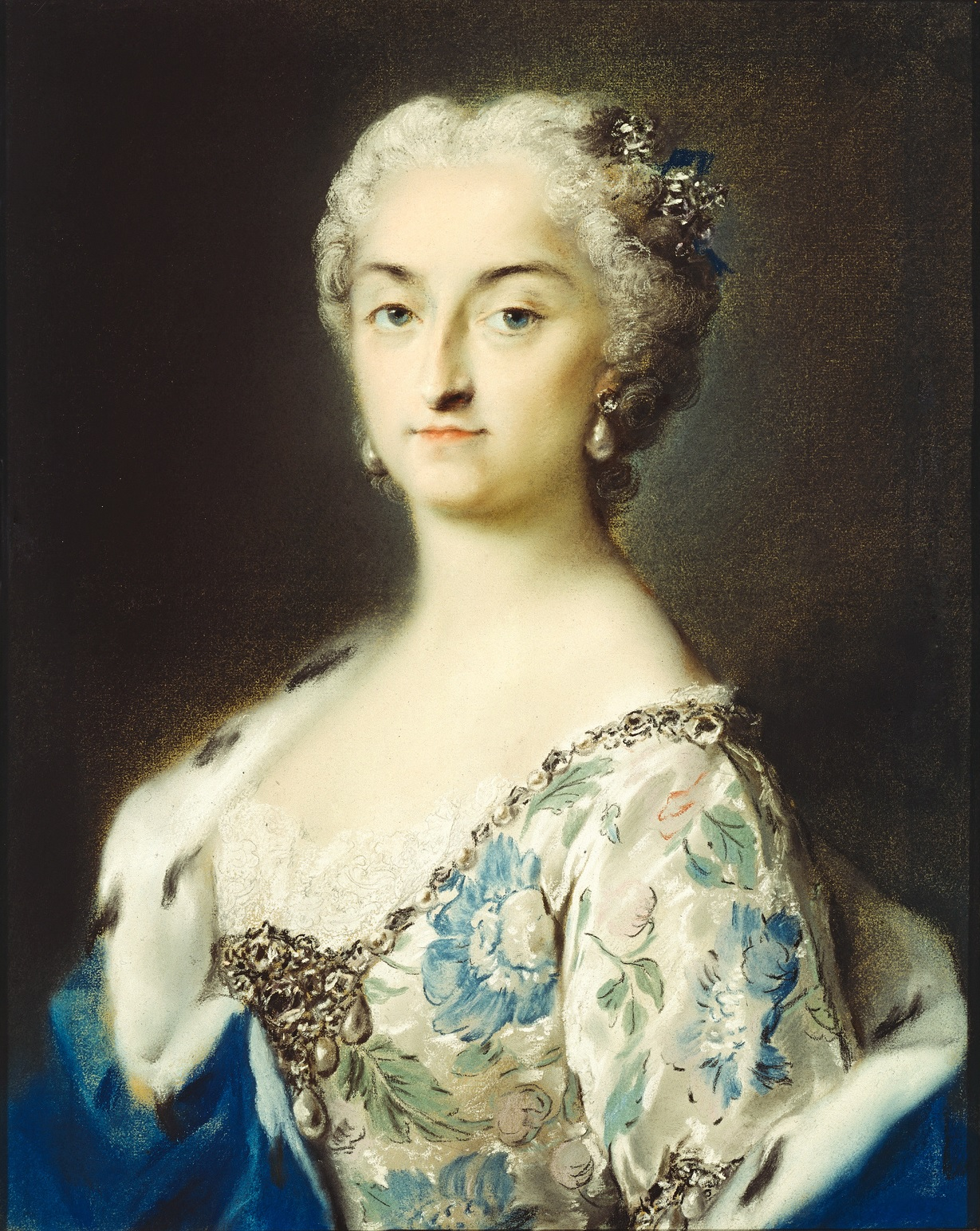
- Portrait by Rosalba Carriera, c. 1730
- Born: 25 November 1680
- Died: 4 May 1743 (aged 62); Dresden
- Spouse: Jerzy Dominik Lubomirski; Frederick Louis of Württemberg-Winnental
- Issue: Johann Georg, Chevalier de Saxe
- Father: Johann Heinrich von Altenbockum
- Mother: Konstancja Tekla Branicka

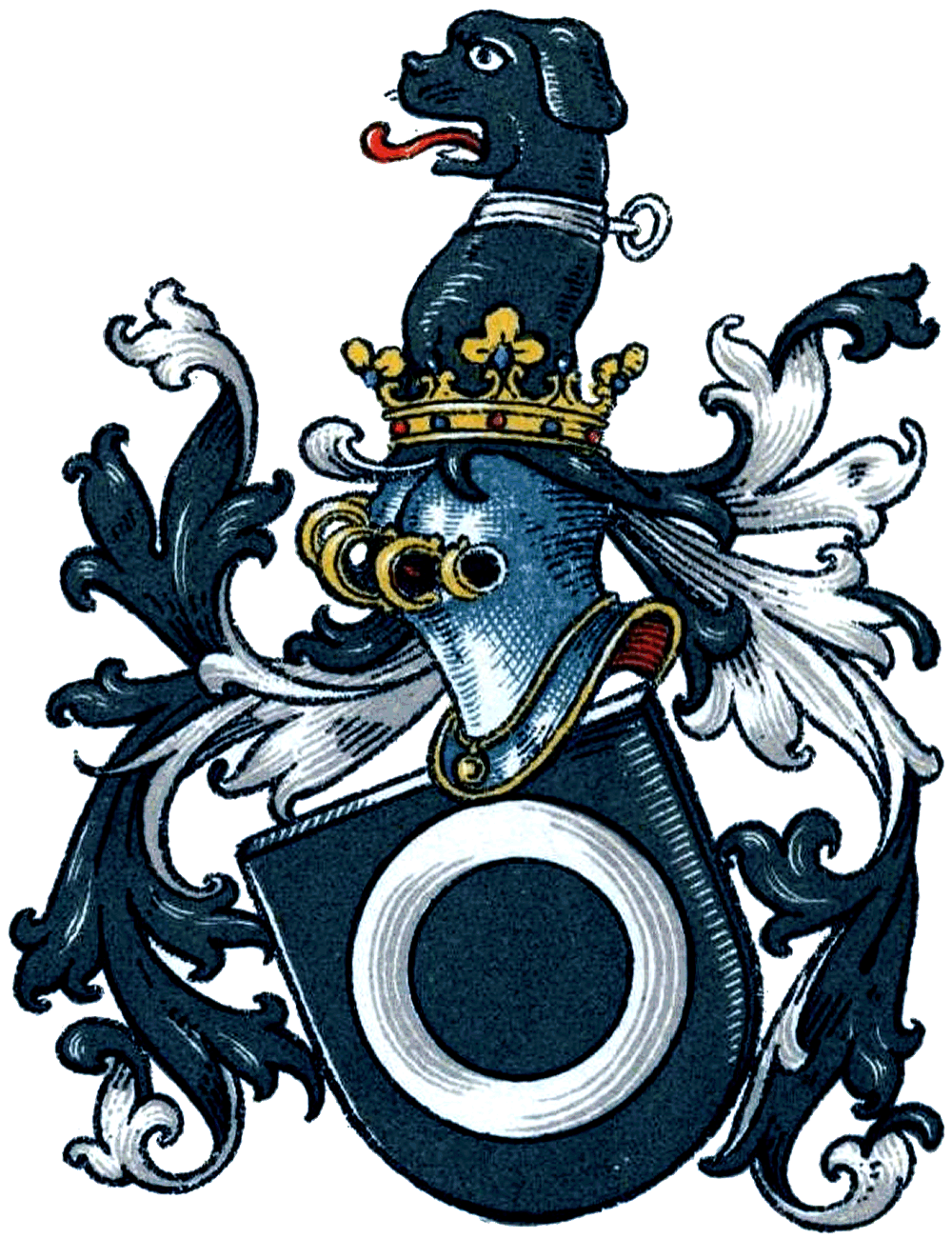
Altenbockum family coat of arms

Ursula Katharina of Altenbockum, divorced Princess Lubomirska, married Duchess von Württemberg-Winnental (Polish: Urszula Katarzyna Lubomirska z domu Bokum; 25 November 1680 – 4 May 1743), later Imperial Princess of Teschen (German: Reichsfürstin von Teschen), was a Polish-German noblewoman and mistress of Augustus II the Strong, King of Poland and Elector of Saxony, in 1700-1705. In 1722 she married Prince Frederick Louis of Württemberg-Winnental.

== Early life ==
Born as the youngest daughter of the Truchsess of Lithuania, Johann Heinrich von Altenbockum (1628-1685), member of an old German noble family who had emigrated from Westphalia in the late 15th century, and his wife, Konstancja Tekla Branicka (1658-1707), the daughter of Jan Klemens Branicki (1624−1673), Court Marshall of the Crown.

== First marriage ==
In 1695, fifteen-year-old Ursula married the Polish Kronoberkaemmerer Prince Jerzy Dominik Lubomirski. He was the youngest son of Grand Marshal and Hetman Prince Jerzy Sebastian Lubomirski and his wife, Barbara Tarło. At that time, the House of Lubomirski ranked among Poland's most influential princely families. They maintained relations with Primate-Cardinal Michał Stefan Radziejowski, archbishop of Gniezno, who, after the death of the Polish king John III Sobieski, was chosen by the new king as his representative. Nevertheless, the Pope soon took the highly unusual step of dissolving this "not very happy marriage".

== Official mistress ==
Around the end of the century, August the Strong, Elector of Saxony and since 1697 King of Poland, had met Princess Lubomirska. After the dissolution of her marriage, he used Ursula's relations with the Cardinal-Primate to meet her.

In 1700 she became King Augustus's official Mätresse, replacing Countess Maximiliane von Lamberg, known to history as Countess Esterle. Augustus the Strong sent Ursula to Saxony and presented her to the Dresden court. The courtiers were impressed by the beautiful, charming and high-spirited princess. On 21 August 1704 she gave birth to a son, Johann Georg, later the Chevalier de Saxe, who was named for the king-elector's father.

Only five days after her son's birth, on 26 August 1704, Ursula was created Reichsfürstin (“Princess of the Empire” or “Imperial Princess”) of Teschen by Emperor Leopold I. This title was only honorific, because only national Princes had seats and votes in the Reichstag.

== Life after Augustus ==
However, later that year, Ursula's relationship with the King ended. In 1705, the Countess Anna Constantia of Hoym, later Countess of Cosel, replaced her as official mistress. Humiliated by the King and outlawed from the Dresden Hof (court), Ursula retired to a countryseat in Hoyerswerda. Augustus the Strong loaned her 250,000 Imperial talers (Reichstaler) for the land, and later he gave her the complete property rights. Then, Ursula moved to her Silesian residence in Breslau.

Years later, after the King had banished the Countess of Cosel, Ursula returned to Dresden, where she occupied a respected position in the Hof. The fall of Augustus II's Lord Chancellor and Lord Chamberlain (Großkanzler) Wolf Dietrich von Beichlingen was at that time attributed to her.

== Second marriage ==
Meanwhile, as a rich lady, she was courted by Frederick Louis of Württemberg-Winnental, third son of Frederick Charles of Württemberg-Winnental and Margravine Eleonore Juliane of Brandenburg-Ansbach, who was ten years her junior. After long persuasion she finally accepted him, and they married secretly on 22 October 1722. On 19 September 1734, after twelve years of marriage, Frederick Louis was killed during the Battle of Guastalla. In accordance with the marriage agreement and despite the unsuccessful opposition from the House of Württemberg, who viewed their marriage as not befitting (mésalliance), the Imperial Princess used the name and coat of arms of her deceased husband until her own death.

== Later life ==
When the King-Elector died in 1733, Ursula was banished from the Hof. Her rule over Hoyerswerda ended in 1737; for compensation, the new Saxon elector and king, August III, gave her an annuity of 18,000 Reichstalern until her death and 6,000 for her son, the Chevalier de Saxe.

== Death ==
Ursula died on 4 May 1743 in Dresden, aged 62. Her mortal remains were buried in the Jesuit Church (Jesuitenkirche) in Leitmeritz (Böhmen).

== See also ==
- Copper-Roof Palace
