= Princess Eleonore Juliane of Brandenburg-Ansbach =

Princess Eleonore Juliane
- Duchess of Württemberg
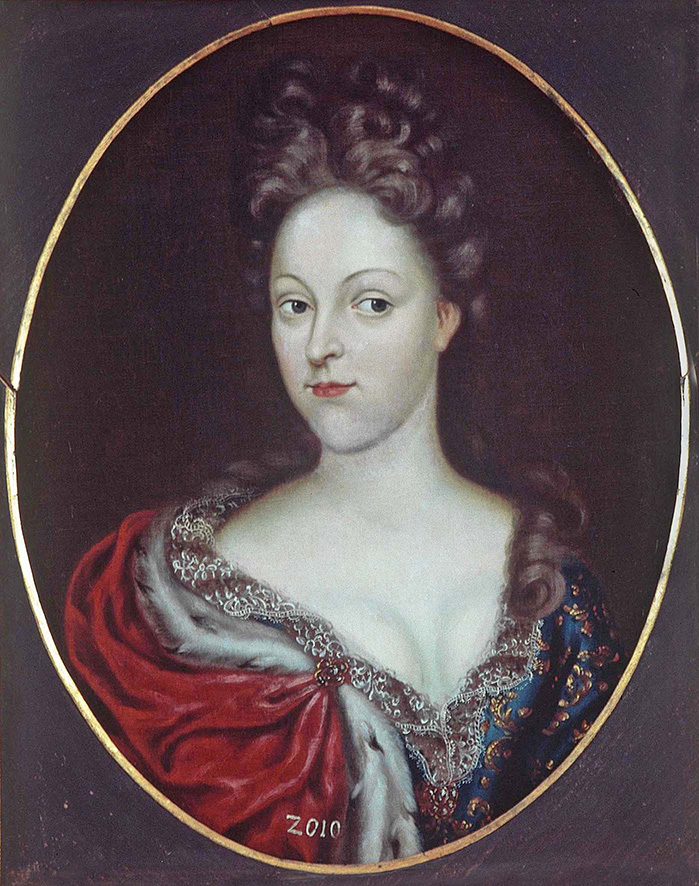
- Eleonore Juliane of Brandenburg-Ansbach
- Born: 23 October 1663; Ansbach
- Died: 4 March 1724 (aged 60); Ansbach
- Spouse: Frederick Charles, Duke of Württemberg-Winnental
- Issue: Charles Alexander, Duke of Württemberg; Henry Frederick of Württemberg-Winnental; Maximilian Emanuel of Württemberg-Winnental; Frederick Louis of Württemberg-Winnental; Christiane Charlotte, Margravine of Brandenburg-Ansbach
- House: Hohenzollern
- Father: Albert II, Margrave of Brandenburg-Ansbach
- Mother: Sophie Margarete of Oettingen-Oettingen

Princess Eleonore Juliane of Brandenburg-Ansbach (23 October 1663 – 4 March 1724) was a princess of Brandenburg-Ansbach and through her marriage duchess of Württemberg-Winnental.

== Life ==
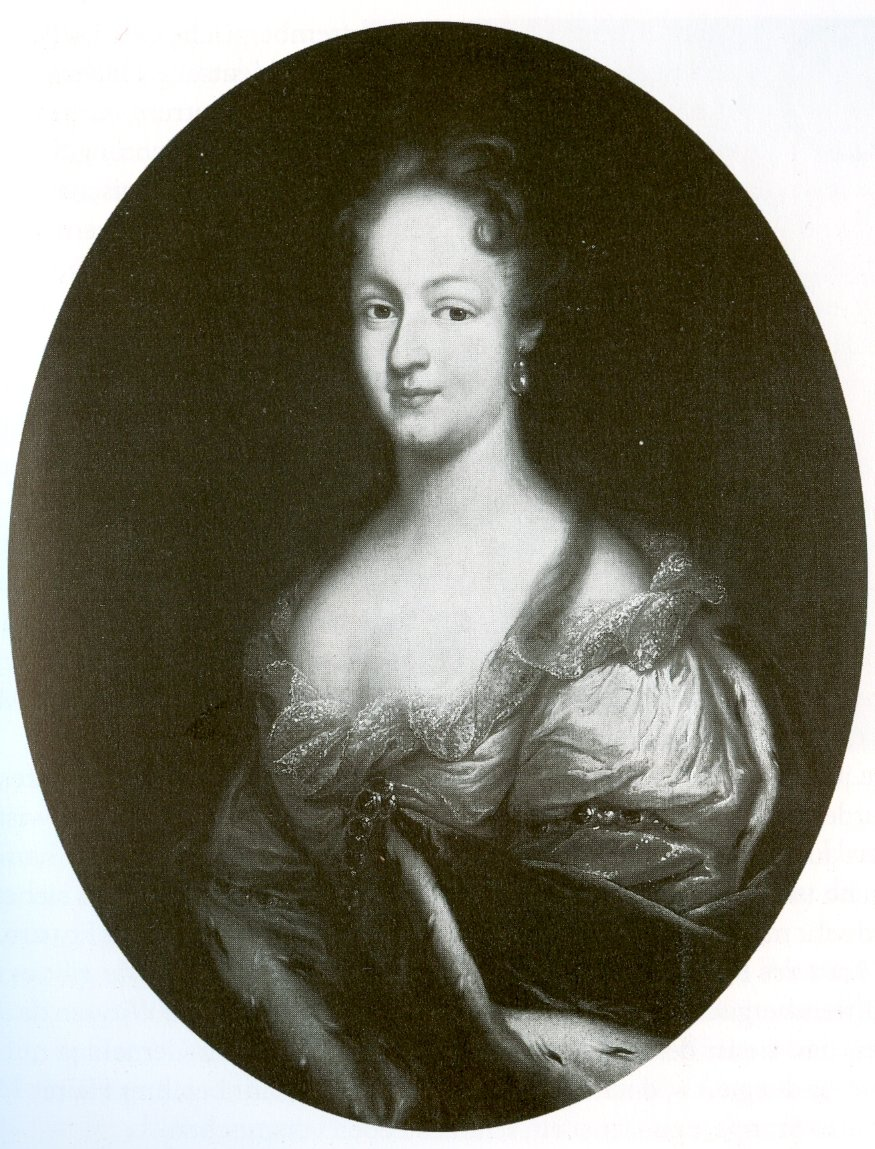
Eleonore Juliane of Brandenburg-Ansbach

Eleonore Juliane was a daughter of Albert II, Margrave of Brandenburg-Ansbach (1620–1667) and his second wife Countess Sophie Margarete (1634–1664), daughter of Joachim Ernst, Count of Oettingen-Oettingen. On 31 October 1682, in Ansbach, she married Frederick Charles, Duke of Württemberg-Winnental, with a commemorative coin struck for the wedding At the wedding Eleonore's brother John Frederick met the composer Johann Sigismund Kusser, who later worked at Ansbach.

After her husband's death, Eleonore moved to Ansbach in 1710 to support her youngest daughter. Eleonore came into personal contact with August Hermann Francke during this time and also wrote songs. Philipp Friedrich von Geismar acted as her advisor and steward. Eleonore is buried in the Stiftskirche, Stuttgart.

== Children ==
- Charles Alexander, Duke of Württemberg (1684–1737)

∞ 1727 Princess Maria Augusta of Thurn and Taxis (1706–1756)

- Dorothea Charlotte (1685–1687)
- Frederick Charles (1686–1693)
- Henry Frederick (1687–1734)
- Maximilian Emanuel (1689–1709)
- Frederick Louis (1690–1734)

∞ 1722 Ursula Katharina of Altenbockum (1680–1743)

- Christiane Charlotte (1694–1729)

∞ 1709 William Frederick, Margrave of Brandenburg-Ansbach (1685–1723)
