= Maximilian Emanuel =

Maximilian Emanuel may refer to:

- Duke Maximilian Emanuel in Bavaria (1849–1893), son of Duke Maximilian Joseph in Bavaria and brother of Empress Elisabeth of Austria
- Maximilian II Emanuel (1662–1726; r. 1679–1726), Elector of Bavaria
- Maximilian Emanuel of Württemberg-Winnental (1689–1709), a volunteer in the army of Charles XII, King of Sweden
- Maximilian, Prince of Hornes (1695–1763), a member of the nobility of the Austrian Netherlands
- Max Emanuel Ainmiller (1807–1870), German artist

== See also ==
- Maximilian (disambiguation)
- Emanuel (disambiguation)
