= Altenbochum =

Coordinates: 51°28′18″N 7°14′46″E

- District of Bochum
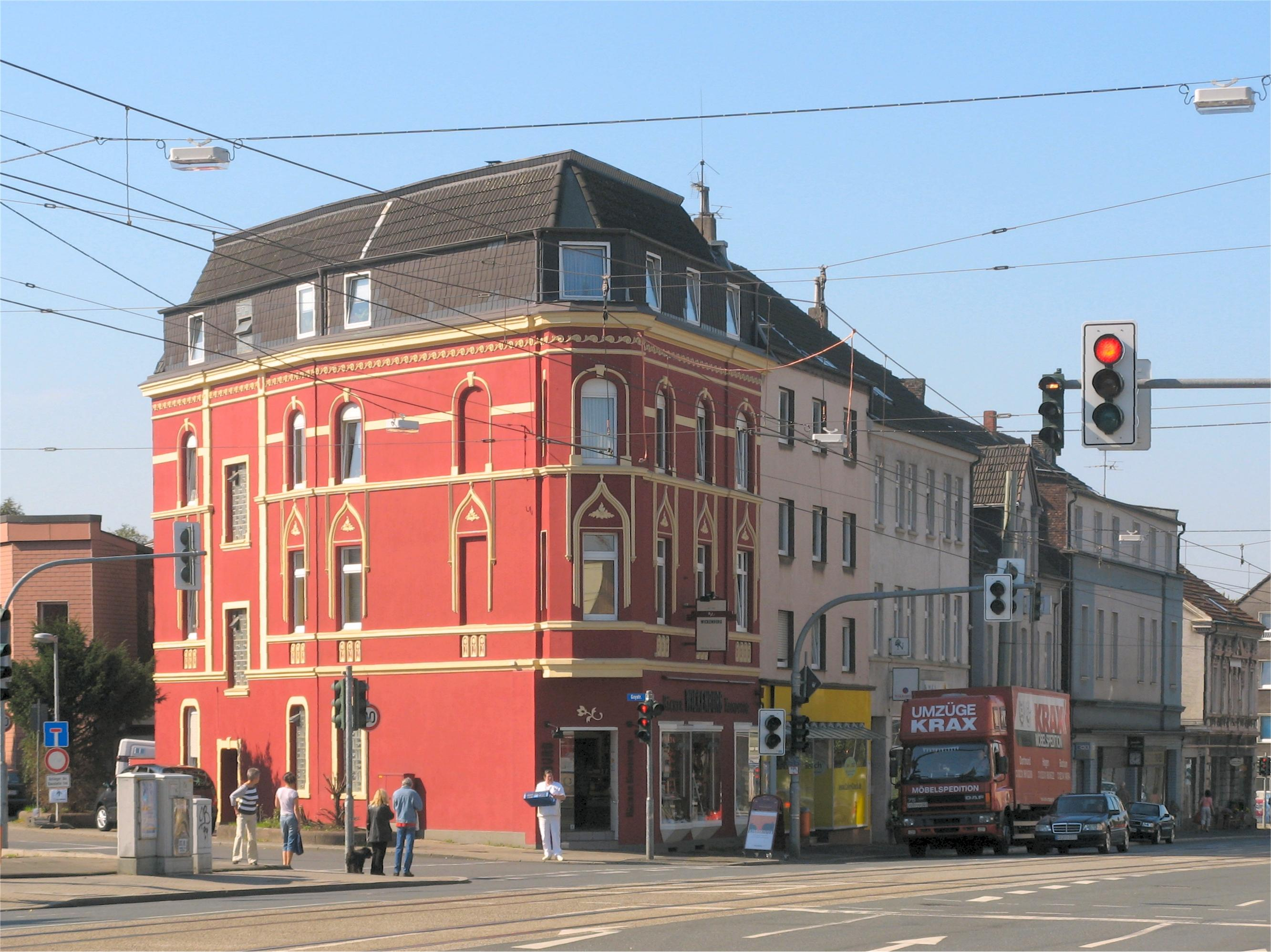
- Altenbochum, Wittener Strasse

- Location within North Rhine-Westphalia
- Country: Germany
- State: North Rhine-Westphalia
- Region: Ruhr area
- City: Bochum
- Time zone: UTC+1 (CET)
  - Summer (DST): UTC+2 (CEST)
- Postal code: 44807
- Dialling code: +49 234

Altenbochum is a statistical area and a district of the city of Bochum in the Ruhr area in North Rhine-Westphalia in Germany. Altenbochum is southeast of the central business district. Altenbochum lies between Gleisdreieck and Laer. Altenbochum is connected to Gelsenkirchen, the district Langendreer, central Witten and Heven (district of Witten) by tram. Tram lines 302 and 310 and several bus lines stop here.

== History ==
The first documented mention of Altenbochum as aldanbochem dates back to around the year 900, in the levy register of the Werden monastery, which listed many farming communities in the Borahtron district.
