= Henry Frederick of Württemberg-Winnental =

German general (1687-1734)

Henry Frederick of Württemberg-Winnental (16 October 1687, in Stuttgart – 26 September 1734, in Winnental) was a German general.

== Biography ==
He was the third son of Frederick Charles, Duke of Württemberg-Winnental and Eleonore Juliane of Brandenburg-Ansbach.

He received his education in Tübingen and Geneva. In 1703, he came to the court of Frederick I of Prussia in Berlin. He received a commandery of the Order of St. John and joined the Dutch army during the War of the Spanish Succession. In 1709, he was appointed major general. During this time, he participated in all major battles in the Spanish Netherlands, such as Jodoigne, Oudenaarde, Mons, and Malplaquet. He distinguished himself at the Siege of Huy in 1705 and at the Battle of Ramillies in 1706, where he was also wounded.
After the war, he entered in the service of the Habsburg Army and became Generalfeldwachtmeister in 1714, Colonel of the 10th Infantry Regiment in 1715, Feldmarschallleutnant in 1716, and General of the entire Imperial Cavalry in 1723.

During the Turkish War of 1716-1718, he fought near Temesvar and was wounded during the Battle of Petrovaradin on 5 August 1716. He also participated in the Siege of Belgrade (1717).

During the War of the Polish Succession, he served as governor of the Duchy of Milan alongside Field Marshal Wirich Philipp von Daun. After Daun's defeats, he was transferred to the Rhine in 1734, where he fell ill and subsequently died in Winnental.

== Ancestors ==
Ancestors of Henry Frederick of Württemberg-Winnental

8. John Frederick, Duke of Württemberg
4. Eberhard III, Duke of Württemberg
9. Princess Barbara Sophie of Brandenburg
2. Frederick Charles, Duke of Württemberg-Winnental
10. Johannes Casimir, Wild- and Rhinegrave of Salm-Kyrburg
5. Wild- and Rhinegravine Anna Katharina of Salm-Kyrburg
11. Countess Dorothea of Solms-Laubach
1. Henry Frederick of Württemberg-Winnental
12. Joachim Ernst, Margrave of Brandenburg-Ansbach
6. Albert II, Margrave of Brandenburg-Ansbach
13. Countess Sophie of Solms-Laubach
3. Margravine Eleonore Juliane of Brandenburg-Ansbach
14. Joachim Ernst, Count of Oettingen-Oettingen
7. Countess Sophie Margarete of Oettingen-Oettingen
25. Countess Anna Sibylla of Solms-Sonnenwalde-Pouch
