= Frederick Charles, Duke of Württemberg-Winnental =

Duke (1652–1697)

Frederick Charles
- Duke of Württemberg-Winnental
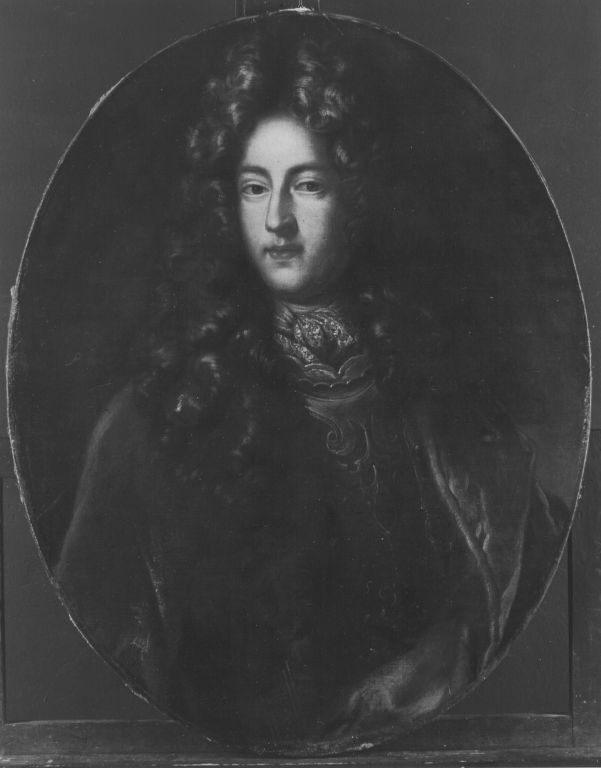
- Frederick Charles, Duke of Württemberg-Winnental
- Born: 12 September 1652; Stuttgart, Duchy of Württemberg
- Died: 20 December 1697 (aged 45); Stuttgart, Duchy of Württemberg
- Spouse: Margravine Eleonore Juliane of Brandenburg-Ansbach
- House: Württemberg
- Father: Eberhard III, Duke of Württemberg
- Mother: Anna Catharina of Salm-Kyrburg

Frederick Charles of Württemberg-Winnental (12 September 1652 – 20 December 1697) was since 1677 Duke of the new-founded line of Württemberg-Winnental and regent of the infant Duke Eberhard Ludwig.

== Biography ==
Born on 12 September 1652 at Stuttgart, Frederick Charles was the second son of Eberhard III, Duke of Württemberg and Anna Catharina of Salm-Kyrburg.

On 27 November 1677 he was given the regency over his nephew, Eberhard Louis, after the death of his older brother, William Louis, and with that the regency over Württemberg. This ended on 22 January 1693 when Eberhard Ludwig reached the age of majority. Out of recognition he received a large sum of money and was appointed Generalfeldmarschall by the Kaiser.

Frederick Charles fought against the French on the Rhine in the War of the Grand Alliance under Louis William, Margrave of Baden-Baden. On 27 September 1692, an imperial army unit of 4,000 cavalry men under his command was attacked by surprise in their camp in Ötisheim near Mühlacker. They withdrew hastily and lost several hundred men, either killed or captured by the French. The Duke himself was among the prisoners, but was released soon after.

He fell ill in 1696 of syphilis and died the next year in Stuttgart.

== Marriage and children ==
Frederick Charles married on 31 October 1682 Margravine Eleonore Juliane of Brandenburg-Ansbach (1663–1724), daughter of Albert II, Margrave of Brandenburg-Ansbach.

They had seven children :

- Charles Alexander (1684–1737), who would become the 11th Duke of Württemberg.
- Dorothea Charlotte (1685–1687)
- Frederick Charles (1686–1693)
- Henry Frederick (1687–1734), served in the Dutch army until 1713.
- Maximilian Emanuel (1689–1709), volunteer in the army of Charles XII of Sweden and a devoted friend to the king.
- Frederick Louis (1690 - killed September 19, 1734) at the Battle of Guastalla. He married on October 22, 1722 Ursula von Alten Brockum (November 25, 1680 - May 4, 1743).
- Christiane Charlotte (1694–1729) - married William Frederick, Margrave of Brandenburg-Ansbach
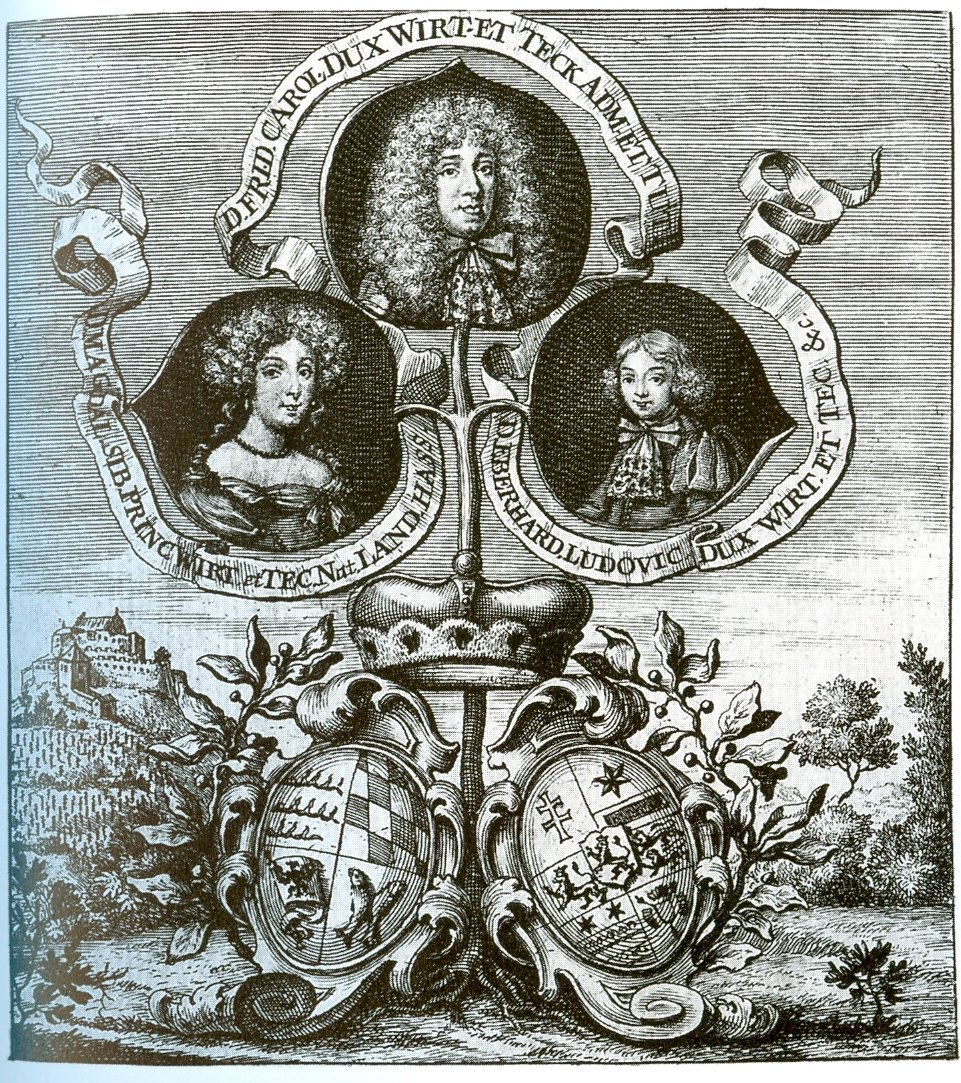
Frederick Charles of Württemberg-Winnental (center), his sister-in-law Magdalena Sibylla of Hesse-Darmstadt (left) and Eberhard Ludwig (right)

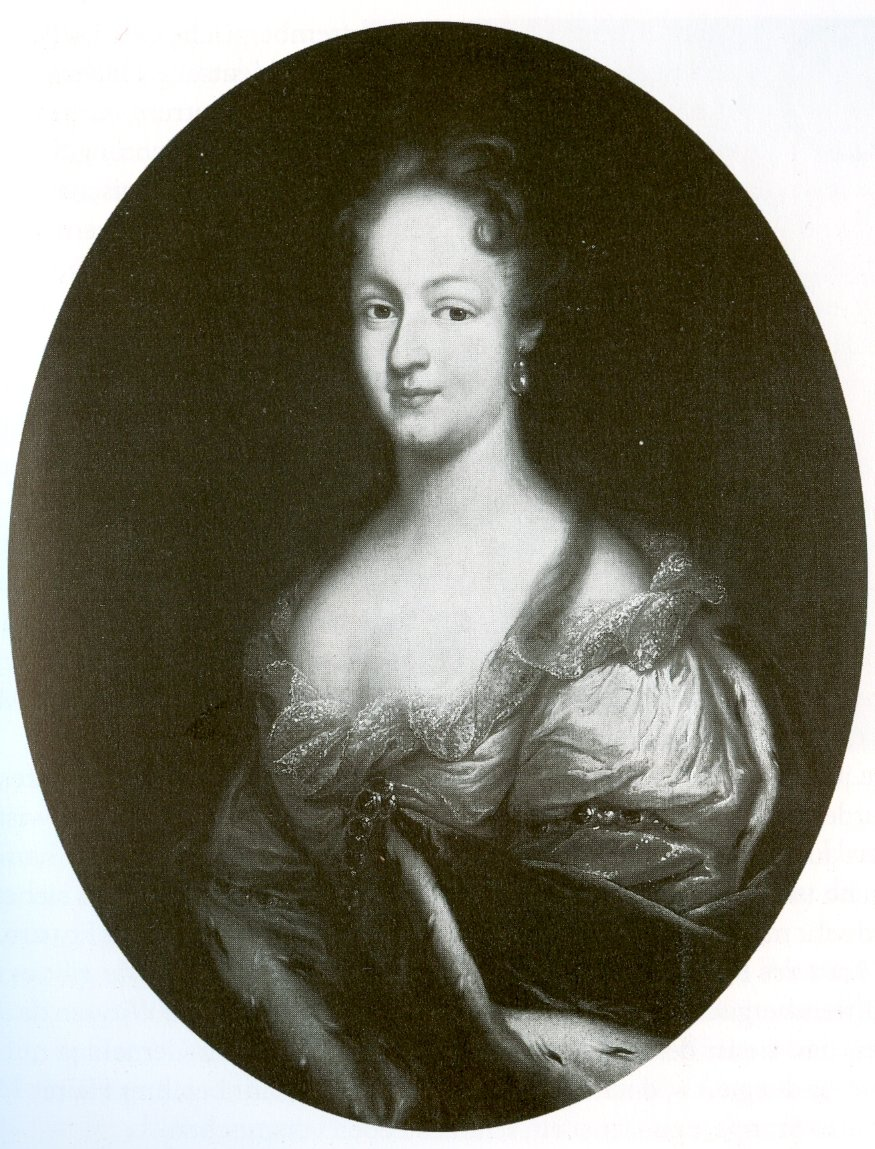
Eleonore Juliane von Brandenburg-Ansbach

== Ancestry ==
Ancestors of Frederick Charles, Duke of Württemberg-Winnental

8. Frederick I, Duke of Württemberg
4. John Frederick, Duke of Württemberg
9. Sibylla of Anhalt-Zerbst
2. Eberhard III, Duke of Württemberg
10. Joachim Frederick, Elector of Brandenburg
5. Barbara Sophie of Brandenburg
11. Catherine of Brandenburg-Küstrin
1. Frederick Charles, Duke of Württemberg-Winnental
12. Otto I, Wild- and Rhinegrave of Kyrburg-Mörchingen
6. John Casimir, Wild- and Rhinegrave of Kyrburg
13. Otillie of Nassau-Weilburg
3. Anna Katharina of Salm-Kyrburg
14. John George I, Count of Solms-Laubach
7. Dorothea of Solms-Laubach
15. Margarete of Schönburg-Glauchau
