= Johann Georg, Chevalier de Saxe =

Saxon Field Marshal and Governor of Dresden (1704–1774)

Johann Georg
- Chevalier de Saxe; Governor of Dresden
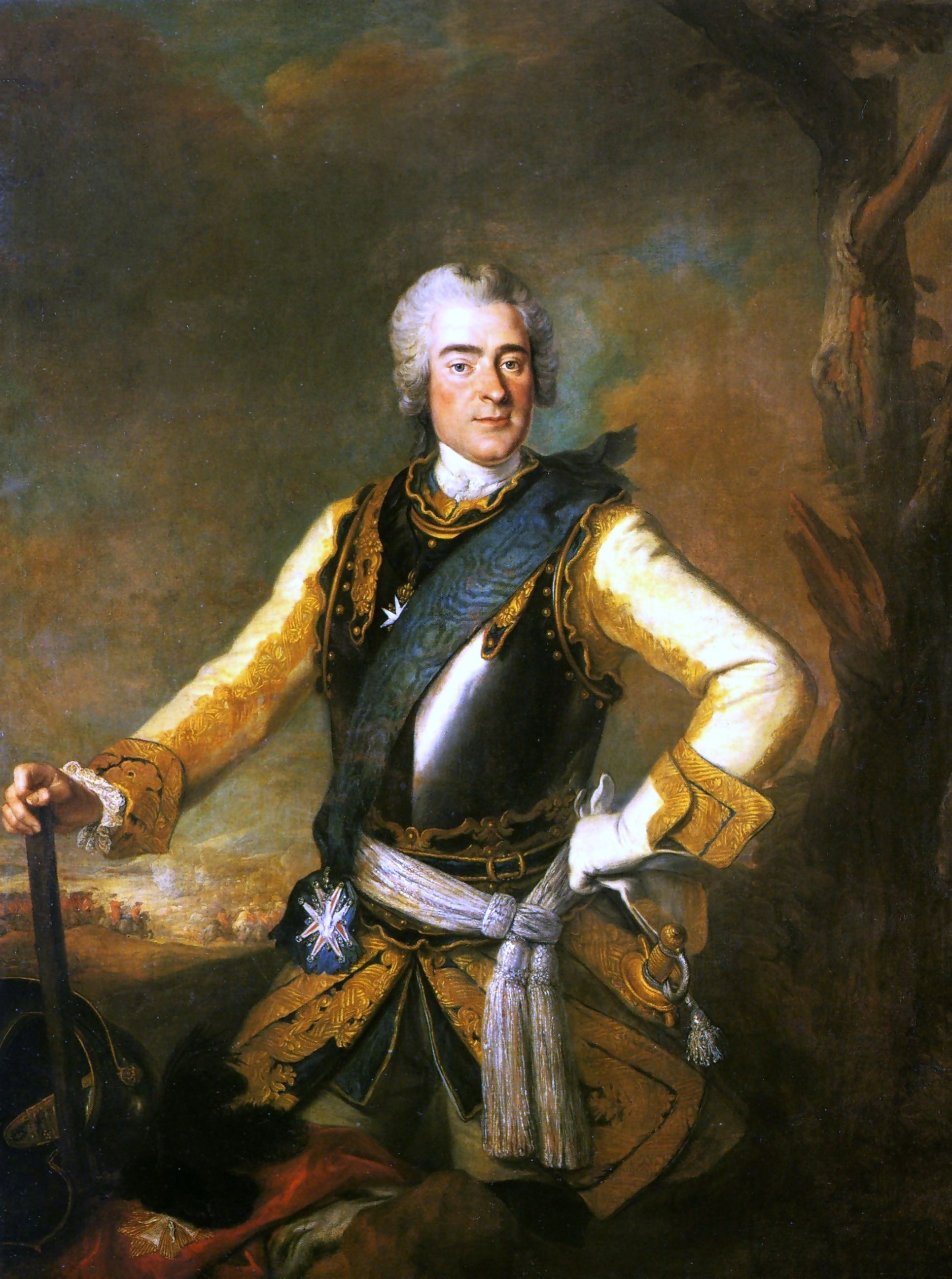
- Portrait by Louis de Silvestre (1744)
- Born: 21 August 1704
- Died: 25 February 1774 (aged 69); Zinzendorfsche Garten, Dresden
- Burial: Roman Catholic Churchyard, Dresden
- House: Wettin
- Father: Augustus II of Poland
- Mother: Ursula Katharina of Altenbockum

Johann Georg, Chevalier de Saxe (21 August 1704 – 25 February 1774), also called Johann Georg of Saxony, was a Saxon Field Marshal and Governor of Dresden.

He was an illegitimate son of August the Strong, King of Poland, Grand Duke of Lithuania and Elector of Saxony, and Ursula Katharina of Altenbockum, divorced Princess Lubomirska, since August 1704 Imperial Princess (Reichsfürstin) of Teschen.

== Life ==
When he was legitimized, his father gave him the title of Chevalier de Saxe. Initially, Johann Georg chose a spiritual path and became a Knight of Malta, but later, like all of August's illegitimate sons, he joined the army, starting at the top (as a colonel).

In 1732, he joined the Austrian expedition to suppress the Corsican War of Independence. He then participated in the War of the Polish Succession in Poland, and in 1737 was a member of the Saxon auxiliary corps sent to the Emperor during the Austro-Turkish War (1737–1739). In 1740, he became Saxon General of Cavalry, which he commanded in the First and Second Silesian Wars under the overall command of his half-brother, Frederick Augustus Rutowsky.

After the outbreak of the Seven Years' War, he was taken prisoner by the Prussians on 15 October 1756 after the Siege of Pirna. He spent most of his captivity on the Vitzthum estate of Wölkau near Delitzsch. After the Peace of Hubertsburg, he was tasked with restoring the Saxon army, and on July 27, 1763, he was appointed Generalfeldmarschall (Field marshal). He diligently undertook the task of transforming the Saxon army into a combat-ready force by eliminating unnecessary pomp.

=== Later life ===
On 27 November 1764 Johann Georg acquired, for 14,000 thalers, the so-called Zinzendorfsche Garten, located outside Dresden's city gates. In the middle of the property, the building and landscape architect Friedrich August Krubsacius built a magnificent palace, the Palais du Chevalier de Saxe, in a reserved form of the Rococo style. This was (after the Moszinskapalais and the Brühlschen Palais in Dresden-Friedrichstadt) the third "Maison de Plaisance" of the aristocracy outside the Dresden city walls. The interiors were not excessively large, emphasis being on the contemporary inclination towards elegance, intimacy and comfort. The palace annexes provided for functional spaces.

The garden was also extended into some fields on the property, being reshaped significantly. According to the principles of the French Baroque garden, it was severe in design. The palaces determined the centerline of the whole arrangement, with the salon overlooking all the garden's essential parts.

On 30 January 1770, the Chevalier took leave of the army and moved to his garden property, without however renouncing his right to the large urban royal suite. Four years later, aged sixty-nine, after a prolonged illness, he died. He never married and had no children.

=== His will ===
In his will, the Chevalier declared his half-sister, Friederike Alexandrine, Countess of Cosel (by marriage Countess Moszyńska) his sole heir. For the separation of still more existing debts, the obligation was imposed on her to offer the garden with the palace, first to the Elector Frederick Augustus, and then to the prince Karl for 15,000 talers to the purchase. Only in the event of rejection would she be allowed to keep the garden herself, but only upon payment of a capital sum of 10,000 talers to settle the debts.

Immediately after the reading of the will, it was contested by the Commander of the Knights of Malta, Oberhofmeister Baron of Forell. He informed the Elector that the Chevalier had been a member of the Order since 1728, and that consequently his estate belonged to the Knights of Malta. In 1776, the lawsuit brought by the Order was decided in its favour. As the deceased had badly underestimated his debts, amounting to c. 36,000 talers, the estate was liquidated, with creditors realizing 80% of the debts owed them and the Order receiving only 5,000 talers.

Johann Georg was buried in the Roman Catholic Churchyard (Innerer Katholischen Friedhof) in Dresden.
