= 1757 raid on Berlin =

1757 skirmish

Coordinates: 52.523405°N 13.4114°E

- Part of the Third Silesian War (Seven Years' War)
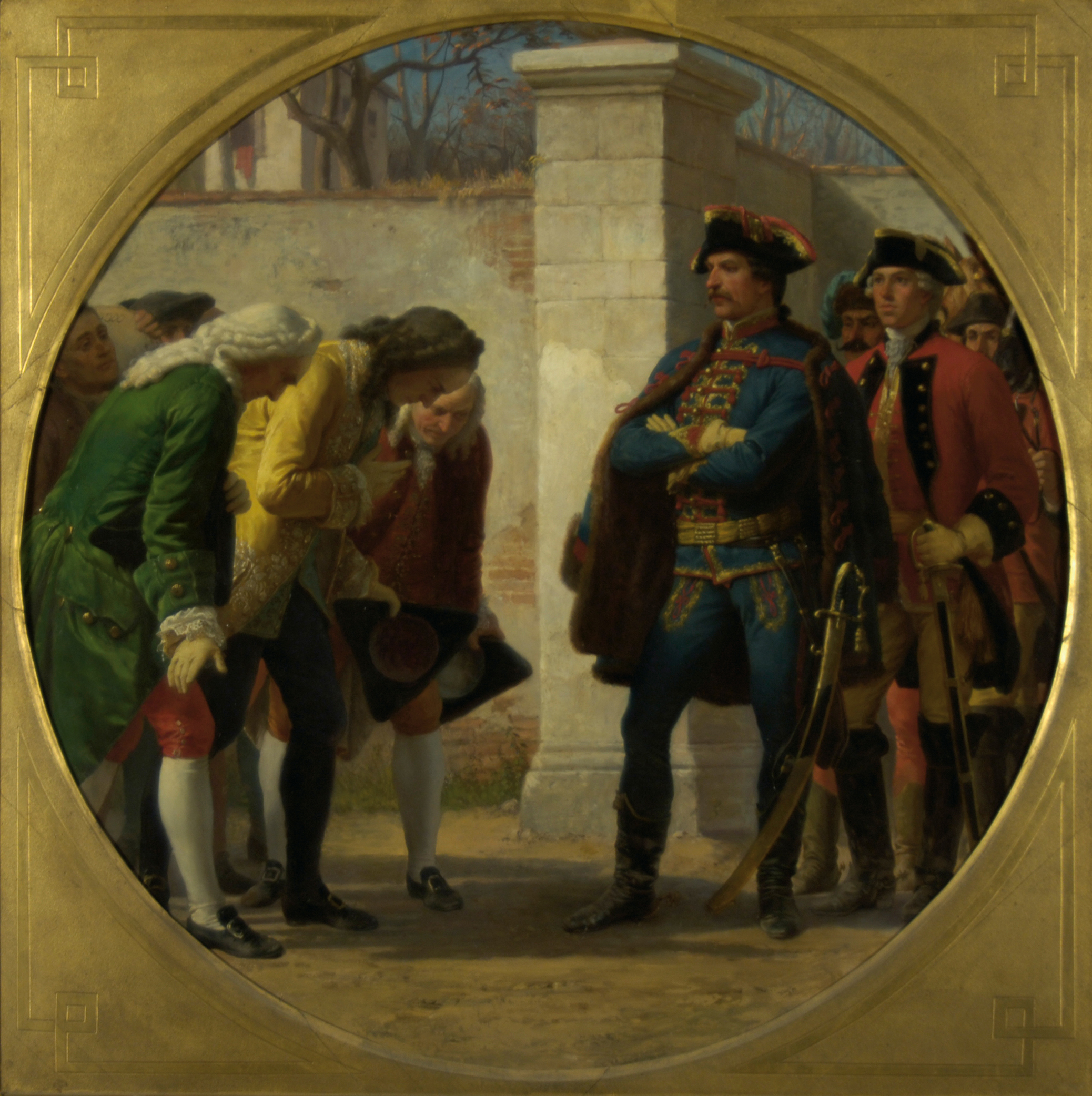
- Der Überfall auf Berlin 1757 by Karl von Blaas, 1865
Date	16 October 1757
Location	Berlin, Prussia
Result	Holy Roman Empire victory
Territorial changes	Prussian ransom payment of 250,000 thalers to the Holy Roman Empire

Belligerents
Holy Roman Empire	Kingdom of Prussia

Commanders and leaders
(Holy Roman Empire) Count András Hadik	(Kingdom of Prussia) General Hans Friedrich von Rochow

Strength
5,100-strong raiding party (including troops assigned to guard supply bases)	5,521-strong Berlin garrison

The 1757 raid on Berlin took place during the Third Silesian War (part of the Seven Years' War). Cavalrymen of the Holy Roman Empire attacked and briefly occupied Berlin, the capital of Prussia. According to an apocryphal story General Hadik picked up gloves in Berlin for Empress Maria Theresa, but after leaving he realized that he got only gloves for her left hand. He returned to Berlin and got also the gloves for her right hand.

== Background ==
After the War of the Austrian Succession, traditional European alliances fell apart and were replaced by an Anglo-Prussian pact and a Franco-Austrian alliance. Known as the Diplomatic Revolution, these events caused the Seven Years' War. Frederick II, King of Prussia and bitter rival of the Holy Roman Empress Maria Theresa of Austria, invaded Silesia in 1756 but suffered his first defeat at Kolín on June 18. In the aftermath of the battle, however, Frederick neglected to protect the approach to his capital, Berlin.

== Battle ==
Austrian commanders noticed this flaw, and Prince Charles of Lorraine, commander of Austrian troops facing Frederick's main army, dispatched Hungarian cavalry officer Count András Hadik and a force of about 5,100 men, mostly Hungarian hussars, to capture the city. However, to guard his main base at Elsterwerda, Hadik left behind enough troops that his raiding party was outnumbered by the unsuspecting Berlin garrison.

On 16 October, Hadik and his raiding force arrived outside of Berlin. Although the Prussian defenders were surprised, they refused Hadik's surrender demands. Hadik promptly attacked the city gates, entering the city. The city's military governor, General Hans Friedrich von Rochow, believed that his forces were outnumbered and spirited the royal family to Spandau, while Hadik demanded that the city council pay a ransom of 200,000 thalers and a dozen pairs of gloves for the Empress. The ransom was paid, but Hadik left the city hurriedly when he realized that a significant Prussian force under the Prince of Anhalt-Dessau was marching toward Berlin in an attempt to intercept him.
