= Franciszek Ferdynand Lubomirski =

Polish nobleman (1710–1774)

Franciszek Ferdynant Lubomirski
- Prince
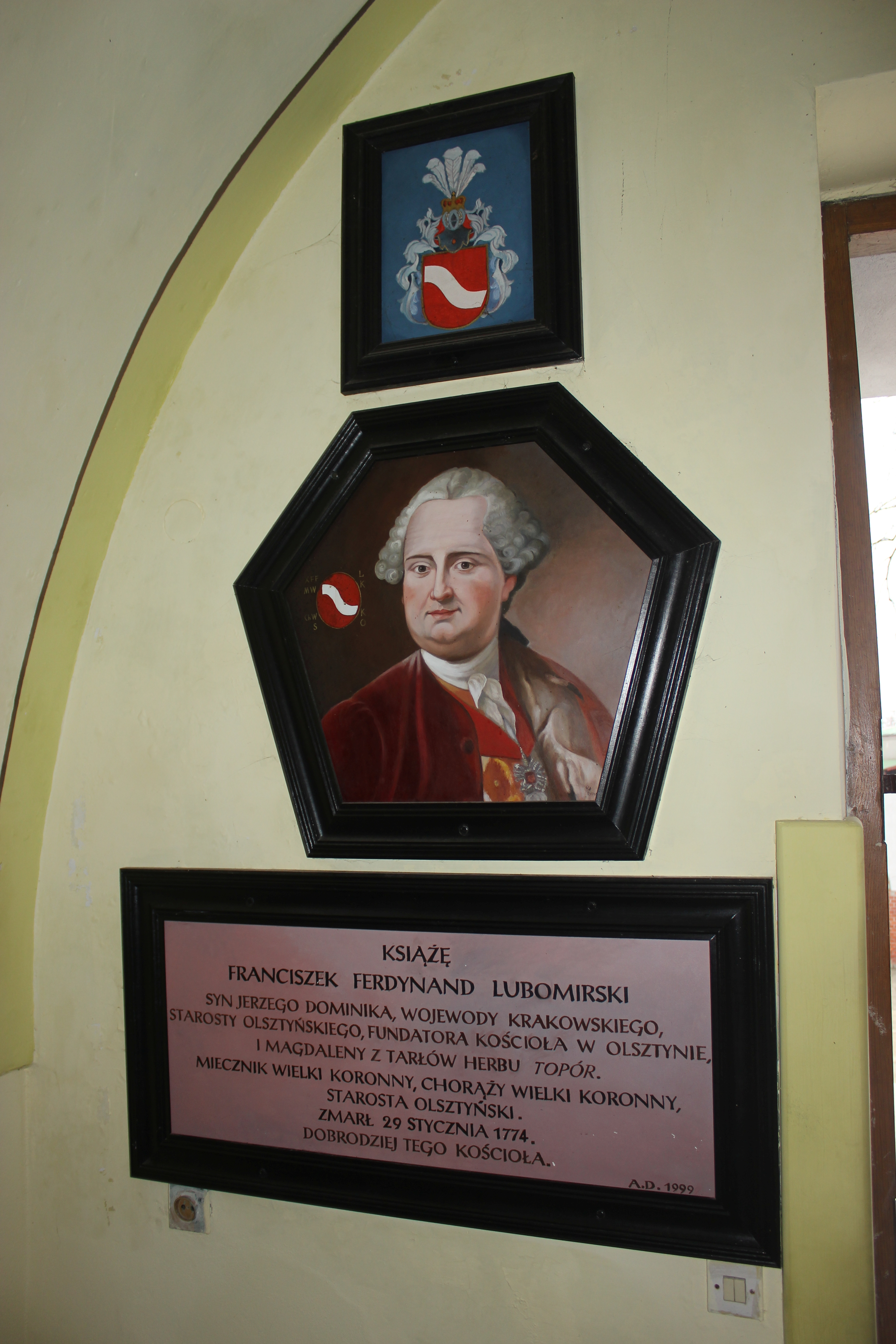

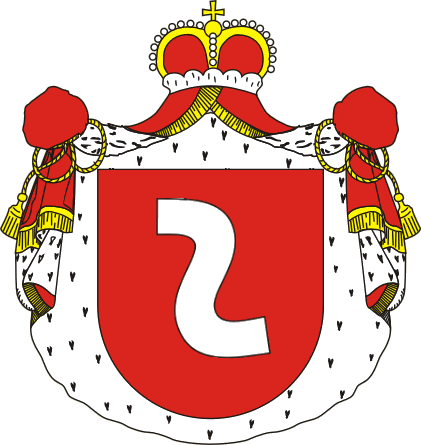
- Coat of arms: Lubomirski
- Full name: Franciszek Ferdynant Lubomirski
- Born: c. 1710
- Died: January 29, 1774
- Family: Lubomirski
- Consort: none
- Father: Jerzy Dominik Lubomirski
- Mother: Magdalena Tarło

Prince Franciszek Ferdynand Lubomirski (c. 1710 – 1774) was a Polish noble (szlachcic) and Knight of the Order of the White Eagle, awarded on 3 August 1762 in Warsaw.

He was the son of the voivode of Kraków Voivodeship, Jerzy Dominik Lubomirski, and Magdalena Tarło.

He was Great Miecznik of the Crown from 1761 to 1771, Great Chorąży of the Crown after 1773, starost of Biecz and Olsztyn and Great Envoy to Saint Petersburg.
