= Bochum-Laer =

District in Bochum city

Coordinates: 51°28′16″N 7°15′49″E

Laer (German pronunciation: [ˈleːɐ̯], formerly [ˈlaːɐ̯]) is a district of the city of Bochum in the Ruhr area in North Rhine-Westphalia in Germany. Laer is to the east of Altenbochum and the central business district. Laer used to base the largest General Motors factory in Germany (Opel), before the Opel site was purchased by Groupe PSA in 2017.
