= Frederick Louis of Württemberg-Winnental =

German general (1690–1734)

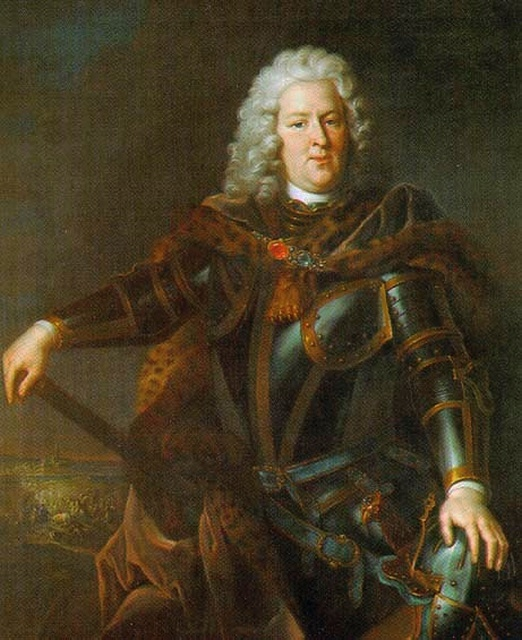
- Portrait by Jacob van Schuppen
- Born: 5 November 1690; Stuttgart
- Died: 19 September 1734 (aged 43); Guastalla
- Spouse: Ursula Katharina Lubomirska
- House: Württemberg
- Father: Frederick Charles, Duke of Württemberg-Winnental
- Mother: Margravine Eleonore Juliane of Brandenburg-Ansbach

Frederick Louis of Württemberg-Winnental (5 November 1690, in Stuttgart – 19 September 1734, in Guastalla) was a German general of the eighteenth century.

He was the third son of Frederick Charles of Württemberg-Winnental and Margravine Eleonore Juliane of Brandenburg-Ansbach.

He learned the art of warfare in Dresden, Saxony. In 1708 he joined the Dutch Army and fought in the War of the Spanish Succession. In 1715 he returned to Saxony and fought against Sweden. In 1716 he fought under Prince Eugene of Savoy against the Turks and participated in the Siege of Belgrade (1717). In 1732 he led an army of 7,000 men for Genoa against the insurgents in Corsica.

== War of the Polish Succession ==
In the War of the Polish Succession, he commanded an army corps on the Italian front under Marshal Claudius Florimund Mercy. They suffered a defeat in the Battle of San Pietro and Mercy was killed.
Württemberg and Marshal Koenigsegg then struggled for command, disturbing the preparations and readiness of the Austrian troops.

This contributed to a second defeat in the Battle of Guastalla, where Württemberg was killed.

== Marriage ==
On 22 October 1722 Frederick Louis married 42-year-old Ursula Katharina von Altenbockum, Princess of Teschen, divorced Princess Lubomirski and one of many ex-mistresses of August II the Strong. Ursula was 10 years older than Frederick, and he married her for financial reasons. They had no children.

== Ancestors ==
Ancestors of Frederick Louis of Württemberg-Winnental

16. Frederick I, Duke of Württemberg
8. John Frederick, Duke of Württemberg
17. Princess Sibylla of Anhalt-Zerbst
4. Eberhard III, Duke of Württemberg
18. Joachim Frederick, Elector of Brandenburg
9. Princess Barbara Sophie of Brandenburg
19. Princess Catherine of Brandenburg-Küstrin
2. Frederick Charles, Duke of Württemberg-Winnental
20. Otto I, Wild- and Rhinegrave of Kyrburg-Mörchingen
10. Johannes Casimir, Wild- and Rhinegrave of Salm-Kyrburg
21. Countess Otillie of Nassau-Weilburg
5. Wild- and Rhinegravine Anna Katharina of Salm-Kyrburg
22. John George I, Count of Solms-Laubach
11. Countess Dorothea of Solms-Laubach
23. Margarete von Schönburg-Glauchau
1. Frederick Louis of Württemberg-Winnental
24. John George, Elector of Brandenburg
12. Joachim Ernst, Margrave of Brandenburg-Ansbach
25. Princess Elisabeth of Anhalt-Zerbst
6. Albert II, Margrave of Brandenburg-Ansbach
26. John George I, Count of Solms-Laubach (= 22)
13. Countess Sophie of Solms-Laubach
27. Margarete von Schönburg-Glauchau (= 23)
3. Margravine Eleonore Juliane of Brandenburg-Ansbach
28. Ludwig Eberhard, Count of Oettingen-Oettingen
14. Joachim Ernst, Count of Oettingen-Oettingen
29. Countess Margareta of Erbach
7. Countess Sophie Margarete of Oettingen-Oettingen
30. Heinrich Wilhelm, Count of Solms-Sonnenwalde-Pouch
25. Countess Anna Sibylla of Solms-Sonnenwalde-Pouch
31. Countess Sophie Dorothea of Mansfeld-Arnstein
