= András Hadik =

Hungarian nobleman, military officer and government official

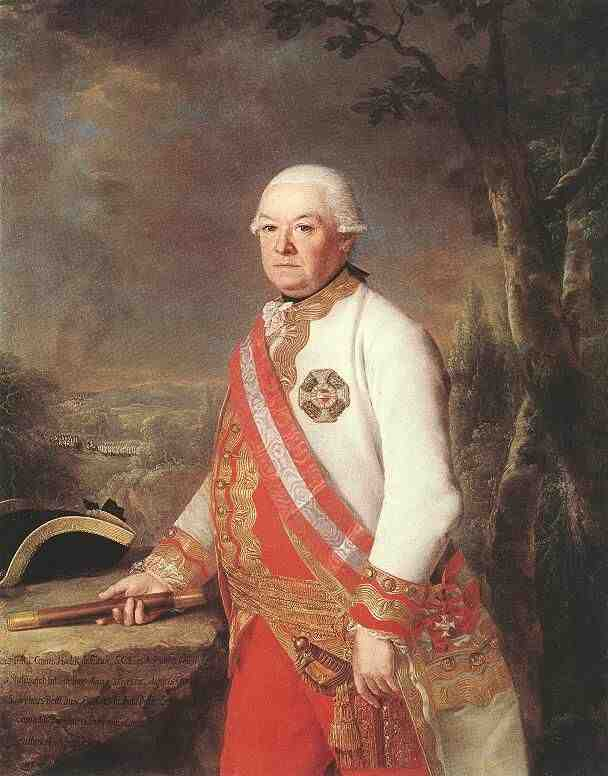
- Andreas Hadik (by Georg Weikert, 1783)
- Born: 16 October 1710; Csallóköz or Kőszeg, Kingdom of Hungary
- Died: 12 March 1790 (aged 79); Futak, Kingdom of Hungary (now Futog, Serbia)
- Occupations: Military officer, government official
- Known for: Capturing the Prussian capital Berlin in the Seven Years' War
- Relatives: Karl Joseph Hadik von Futak

Count András Hadik de Futak (Hungarian: gróf futaki Hadik András; German: Andreas Graf Hadik von Futak; Slovak: Andrej Hadík; 16 October 1710 – 12 March 1790) was a Hungarian nobleman and Field Marshal of the Imperial Army. He was Governor of Galicia and Lodomeria from January 1774 to June 1774, and is the father of Karl Joseph Hadik von Futak. He is famous for capturing the Prussian capital Berlin during the Seven Years' War.

== Early life ==
András Hadik, son of a lesser noble family, was born on October 16, 1710, in either Csallóköz or Kőszeg, in the Kingdom of Hungary, as the second son and third child of Mihály Hadik von Futak (d. 1733) and his wife, Franziska Hardy (b. 1680). He had Hungarian, Luxembourgian and German ancestors. According to another source, he was of Hungarian ethnic origin, but the name "Hadik" is a diminutive from the Slovak appellative had ("snake"), the family was thus of Slovak extraction. Contrary to this belief, Hadik himself had no knowledge of the Slovak language. Alternative theories also suggest his Tartar or Cherkess ancestry.

His father, Mihály Hadik (d. 1733) was a cavalryman. His mother, Franziska Hardy was of German descent. András Hadik volunteered for the Ghilányi hussar regiment of the Imperial Army when he was 20, and at 22 he was given the rank of officer and became the standard bearer in the Dessewffy hussar regiment. Hadik fought in the War of the Polish Succession and the Russo-Turkish War. In 1738, Hadik was promoted to the rank of captain.

== Military successes ==
During the War of the Austrian Succession, Hadik gained fame for his actions against the Prussian Army near the city of Neisse using surprise attacks and tricks under the unwritten laws of the so-called "small war," relying on the excellent training of his light cavalry squadrons. During the war, he served under Prince Charles Alexander of Lorraine and was promoted to the rank of Lieutenant-Colonel. In 1744 he gained the rank of Commanding Colonel of his own hussar regiment, then near the end of the war in 1747 he attained the rank of General and was appointed commander of a cavalry brigade.

Early in the Seven Years' War, Hadik executed the most famous hussar action in history: when Frederick the Great was marching south with his armies, the Hungarian general unexpectedly swung his 5,000 force of mostly hussars around the Prussians and captured their capital of Berlin. The city was spared for a negotiated ransom of 300,000 thalers, which he distributed among his troops. For this feat, Hadik was promoted to the rank of Field Marshal. He was also awarded the Grand Cross of the Military Order of Maria Theresa.

== Marriage and issue ==
András was married to Countess Franziska von Lichnowsky-Woschütz (1725-1787), the only daughter of Count Franz Karl Leopold Bernhard von Lichnowsky-Woschütz (1690-1742) and his wife, Countess Maria Barbara Cajetana von Verdenberg (1697-1755). They had three sons and one daughter:

- Countess Mária Jozefa Hadik von Futak (1750-1842); married in 1765 to Prince Jerzy Marcin Lubomirski (d. 1811); no issue
- Count János Hadik von Futak (1755-1833); married in 1783 to Countess Franziska Josepha Theresia von Breunner (1763-1829); had issue
- Count Károly József Hadik von Futak (1756-1800); married in 1781 to Countess Maria Theresia von Kolowrat-Krakowsky (1756-1844); had issue
- Count András Hadik von Futak (1764-1840); married Baroness Maria Raszler von Gamerschwang (1783-1854); had issue

== Legacy ==
Slovak National Academy of Defense of Marshal Andrej Hadík (2004–2008) was named after him.

- András Hadik. Hungary issued a postage stamp in his honor on 1 January 1943.
- The above stamp overprinted 1 Pengo on 10 filler was issued on 1 May 1945 I the Liberation of Hungary series.
- On 1 February 1946 in the overprinted series the 10 filler stamp was overprinted 40 filler.

== Image gallery ==
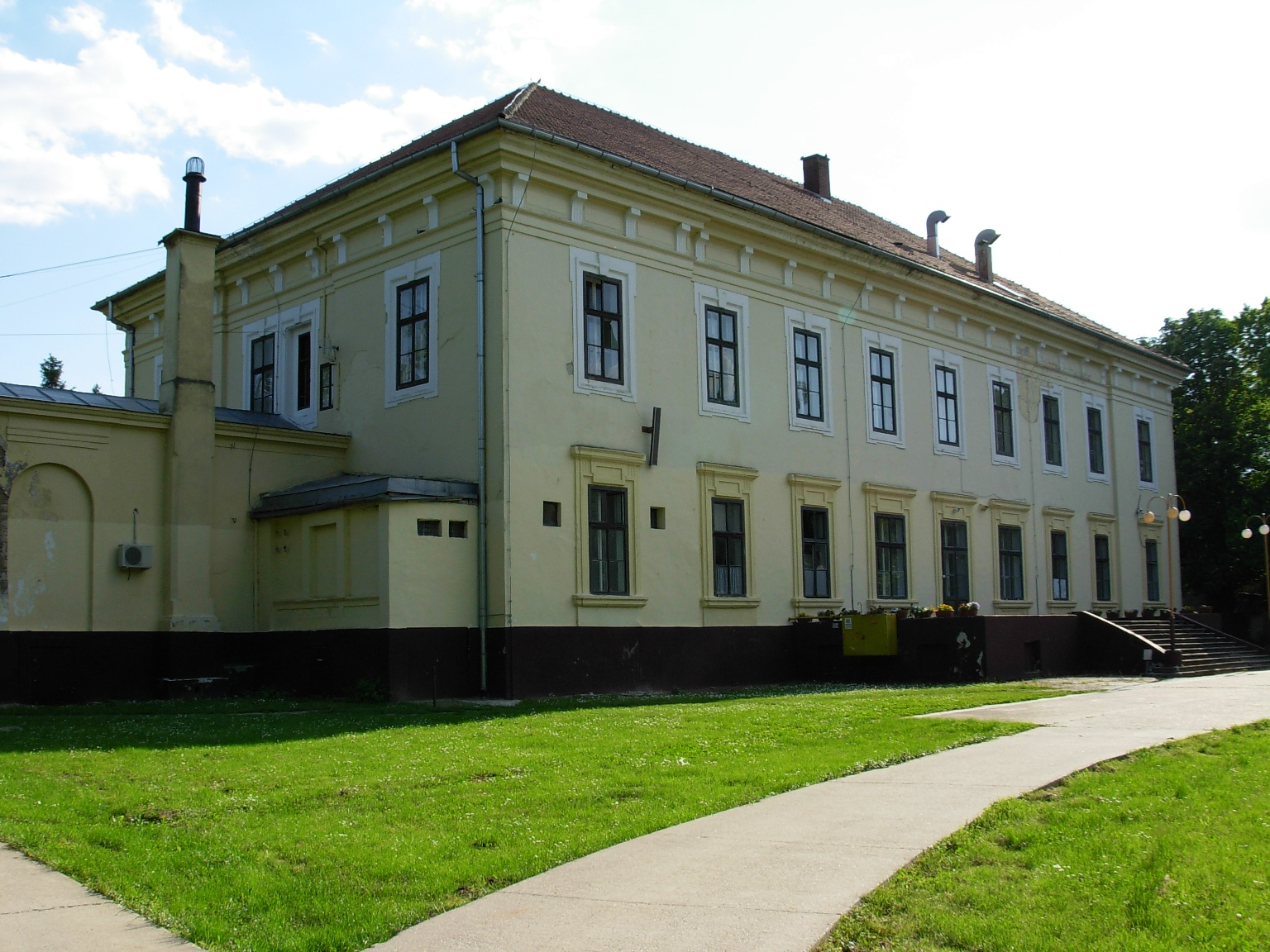
Hadik castle in Futog

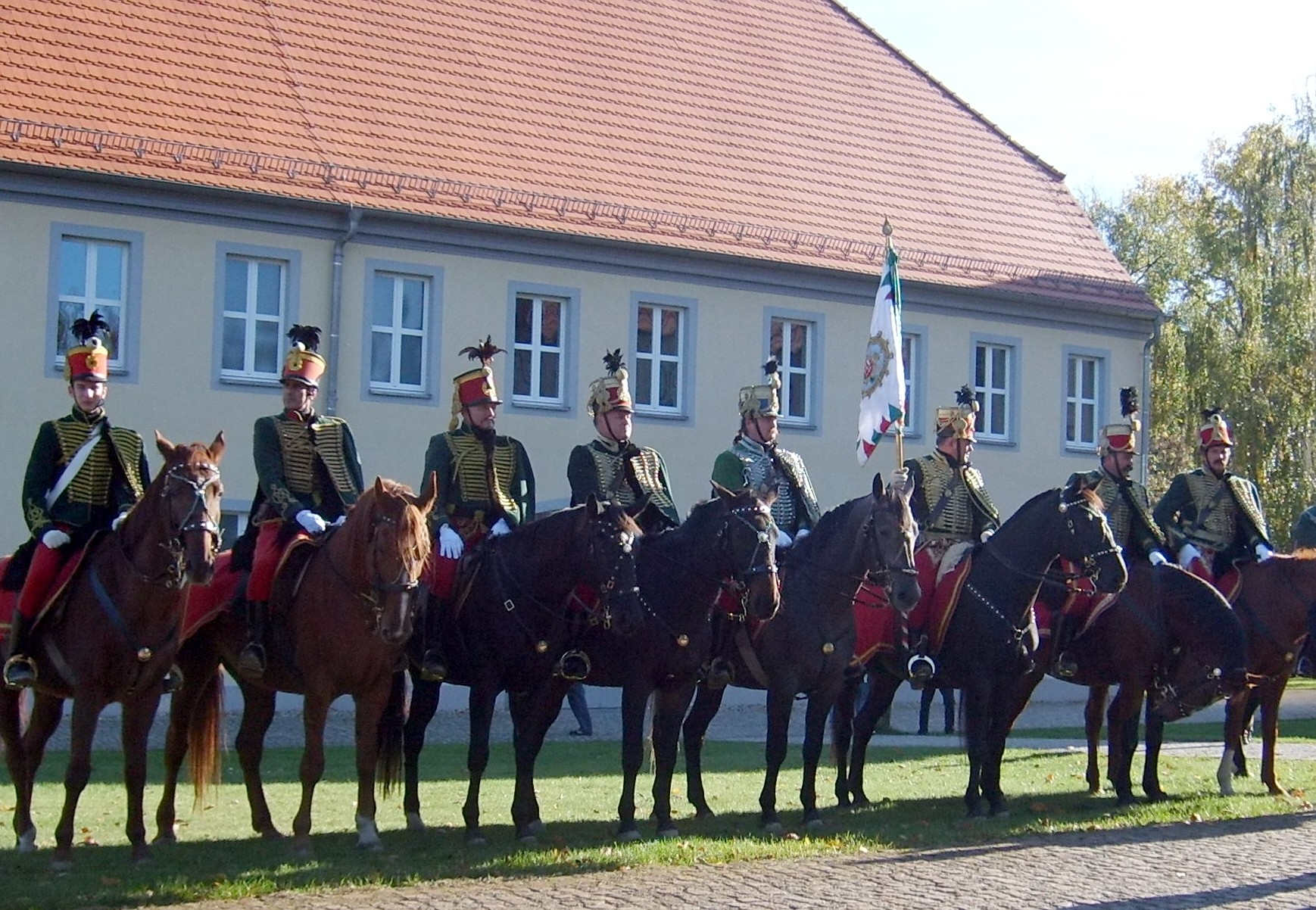
Hungarian Hadik-Hussars in Germany, 2007

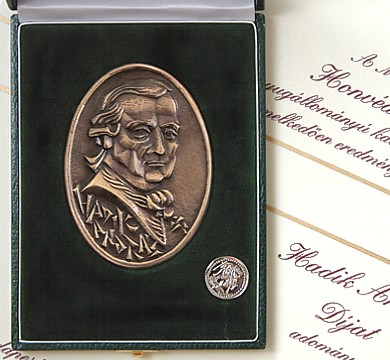
András Hadik prize

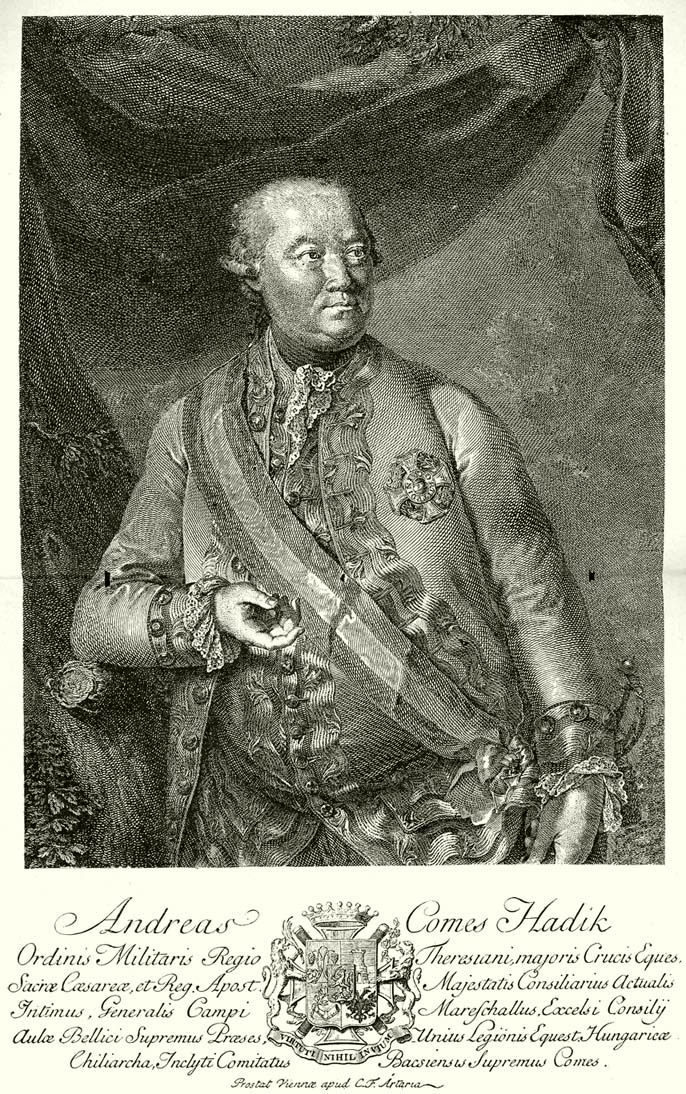
András Hadik

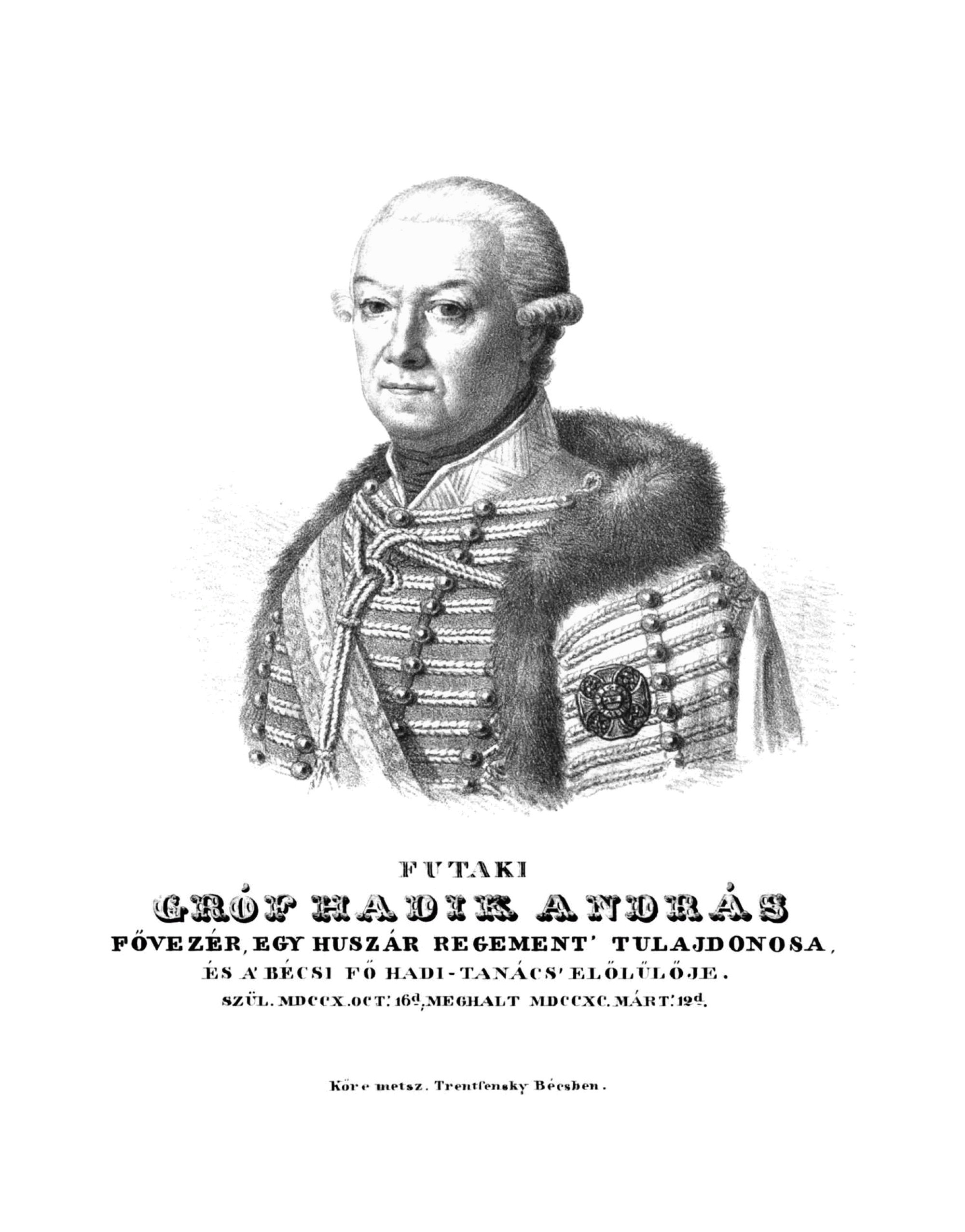
András Hadik

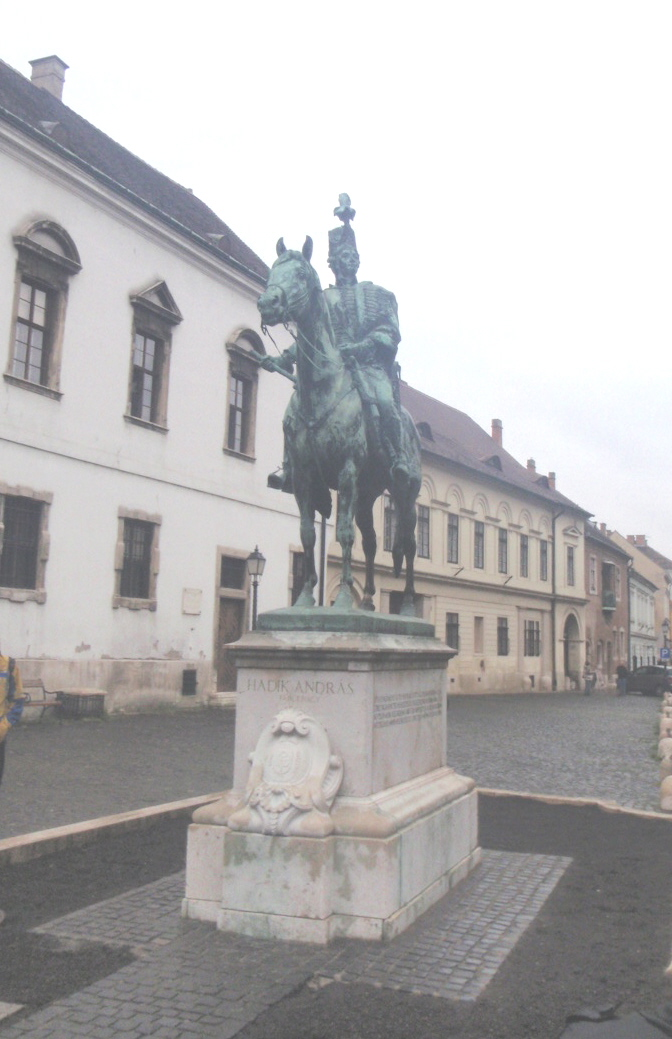
András Hadik's sculpture in Budapest
