= Bochum-Innenstadt =

Coordinates: 51.4818°N 7.2162°E

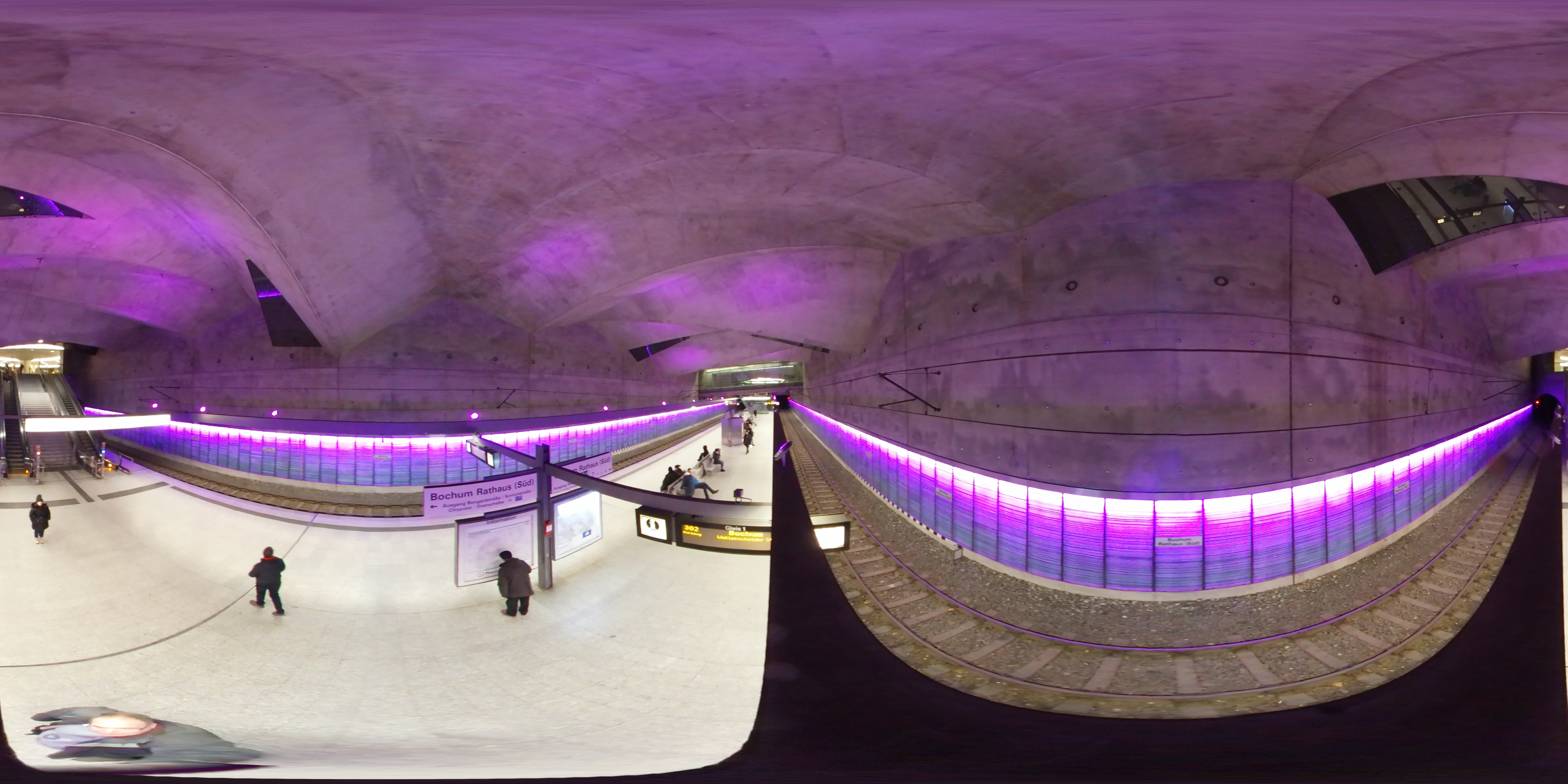
Bochum-Innenstadt train station

Innenstadt is a part of the city of Bochum in North Rhine-Westphalia, Germany, including Gleisdreieck. It is located in the Ruhr area, the most populous German agglomeration.

It includes the central business district of Bochum. Gleisdreieck (triangle of rails) is limited by railway lines. Bochum-Innenstadt additionally has tram lines running to Wattenscheid and other parts of the city as well as to the neighbouring towns of Hattingen, Gelsenkirchen and Herne. Bochum-Innenstadt is the site of the school which Herbert Grönemeyer, the singer of the best selling German album of the 20th century, 4630 Bochum attended. Bochum-Innenstadt is the site of the Bermudadreieck (Bermuda triangle), the main and heterogeneous area of bars frequented by the youth in the Ruhr area.

Innenstadt is the part of Bochum where the city hall and other public buildings as well as historical churches are situated.
