= Jerzy Dominik Lubomirski =

Polish noble (1665–1727)

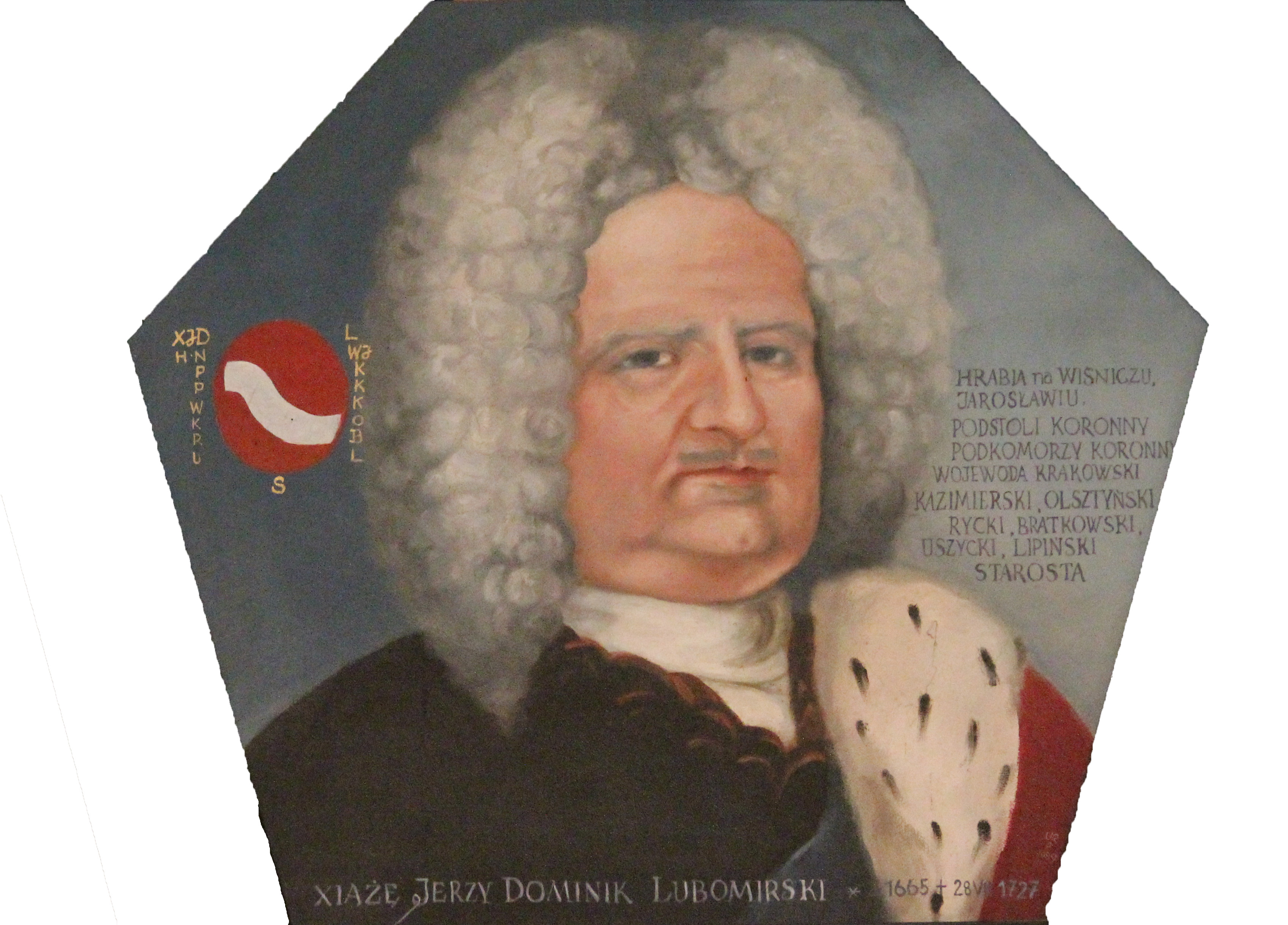

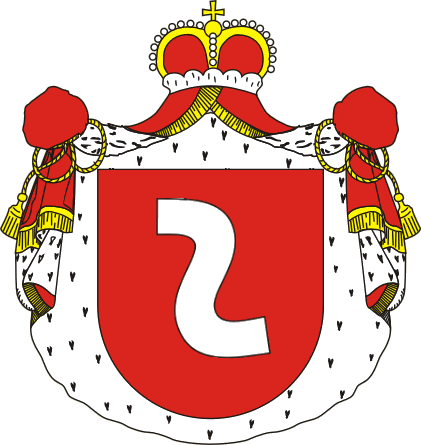
- Coat of arms: Lubomirski
- Born: 1665; Kraków
- Died: 1727 (aged 61–62); Janowiec
- Family: Lubomirski
- Consort: Ursula Katharina of Altenbockum; Magdalena Tarło
- Issue: with Magdalena Tarło; Antoni Benedykt Lubomirski; Franciszek Ferdynant Lubomirski
- Father: Jerzy Sebastian Lubomirski
- Mother: Barbara Tarło

Prince Jerzy Dominik Lubomirski (English: George Dominic; 1665–1727) was a Polish noble (szlachcic).

He was the son of Grand Marshal and Hetman Jerzy Sebastian Lubomirski and Barbara Tarło. In 1695 he married Urszula of Altenbockum. The marriage was dissolved by the Pope and in c. 1710 he married Magdalena Tarło, daughter of Stanisław Tarło, Voivode of Lublin.

He was Podstoli of the Crown since 1695, Podkomorzy of the Crown since 1702, voivode of Kraków Voivodeship since 1726 and owner of Połonne, Janowiec and Lubomla.

He was also the Starost of Olsztyn, Kazimierz Dolny and Lipno.
