= Antoni Benedykt Lubomirski =

Polish noble (1718–1761)

- Prince
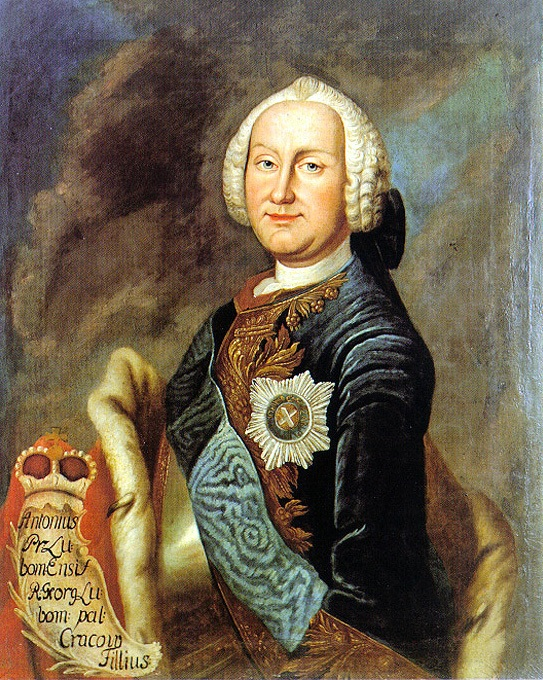

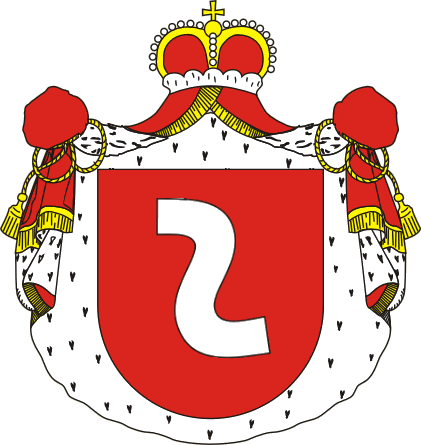
- Coat of arms: Lubomirski
- Full name: Antoni Benedykt Konstanty Lubomirski
- Born: 1718; Radom
- Died: 1761 (aged 42–43); Ujazdów
- Family: Lubomirski
- Spouse: Anna Zofia Ożarowska
- Issue: Jerzy Marcin Lubomirski; Magdalena Agnieszka Lubomirska
- Father: Jerzy Dominik Lubomirski
- Mother: Magdalena Tarło

Prince Antoni Benedykt Konstanty Lubomirski (1718–1761) was a Polish noble (szlachcic).

He was the landowner of the Połonne, Międzyrzecz and Miropol estates. Major General of the Crown Army, Lieutenant General from 1753, Great Sword-bearer of the Crown from 1754. He signed the election of Stanisław Leszczyński in 1733.

He was Marshal of the Sejm, 3 October – 14 November 1746.

He was awarded the Order of the White Eagle on 3 August 1757 in Warsaw
