= Maximilian Emanuel of Württemberg-Winnental =

German noble

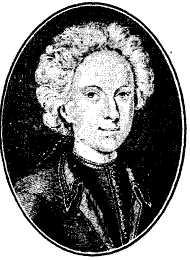
Maximilian Emanuel in his early years

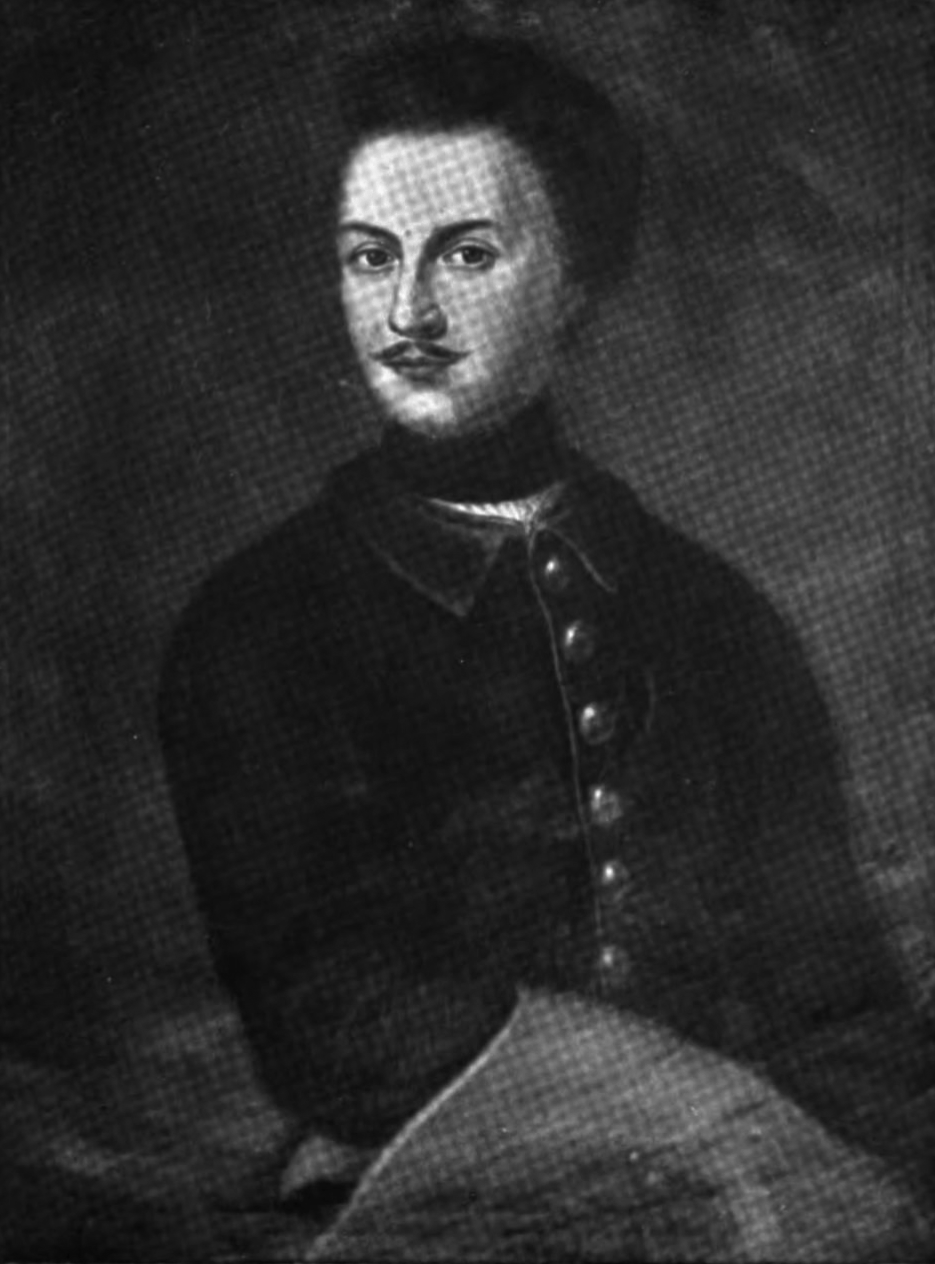
Maximilian Emanuel in 1706–1707

Maximilian Emanuel of Württemberg-Winnental (February 27, 1689 in Stuttgart – September 25, 1709 in Dubno), son of Frederick Charles of Württemberg-Winnental and Margravine Eleonore Juliane of Brandenburg-Ansbach, was a volunteer in the army of Charles XII of Sweden and a devoted friend to the king.

In 1703, at age 14 he joined Charles XII's Polish campaign before the Battle of Pułtusk, and was since known throughout the army as the Little Prince.

On June 18, 1708 he was wounded by the River Berezina while attempting to shield the king from bullets, but recovered in time to fight in the Battle of Holowczyn. He was later made colonel of the Buchwald's Dragoons.

In the Battle of Poltava he was captured by the Russians. Released shortly after, he died on the way home at Dubno in Volhynia. King Charles long mourned the loss of his "best and truest friend".

His heart was buried at St. Gumbertus Church in Ansbach.

== Ancestors ==
Ancestors of Maximilian Emanuel of Württemberg-Winnental

16. Frederick I, Duke of Württemberg
8. John Frederick, Duke of Württemberg
17. Princess Sibylla of Anhalt-Zerbst
4. Eberhard III, Duke of Württemberg
18. Joachim Frederick, Elector of Brandenburg
9. Princess Barbara Sophie of Brandenburg
19. Princess Catherine of Brandenburg-Küstrin
2. Frederick Charles, Duke of Württemberg-Winnental
20. Otto I, Wild- and Rhinegrave of Kyrburg-Mörchingen
10. Johannes Casimir, Wild- and Rhinegrave of Salm-Kyrburg
21. Countess Otillie of Nassau-Weilburg
5. Wild- and Rhinegravine Anna Katharina of Salm-Kyrburg
22. John George I, Count of Solms-Laubach
11. Countess Dorothea of Solms-Laubach
23. Margarete von Schönburg-Glauchau
1. Maximilian Emanuel of Württemberg-Winnental
24. John George, Elector of Brandenburg
12. Joachim Ernst, Margrave of Brandenburg-Ansbach
25. Princess Elisabeth of Anhalt-Zerbst
6. Albert II, Margrave of Brandenburg-Ansbach
26. John George I, Count of Solms-Laubach (= 22)
13. Countess Sophie of Solms-Laubach
27. Margarete von Schönburg-Glauchau (= 23)
3. Margravine Eleonore Juliane of Brandenburg-Ansbach
28. Ludwig Eberhard, Count of Oettingen-Oettingen
14. Joachim Ernst, Count of Oettingen-Oettingen
29. Countess Margareta of Erbach
7. Countess Sophie Margarete of Oettingen-Oettingen
30. Heinrich Wilhelm, Count of Solms-Sonnenwalde-Pouch
25. Countess Anna Sibylla of Solms-Sonnenwalde-Pouch
31. Countess Sophie Dorothea of Mansfeld-Arnstein
