= Jerzy Marcin Lubomirski =

Polish nobleman and general (1738–1811)

- Prince
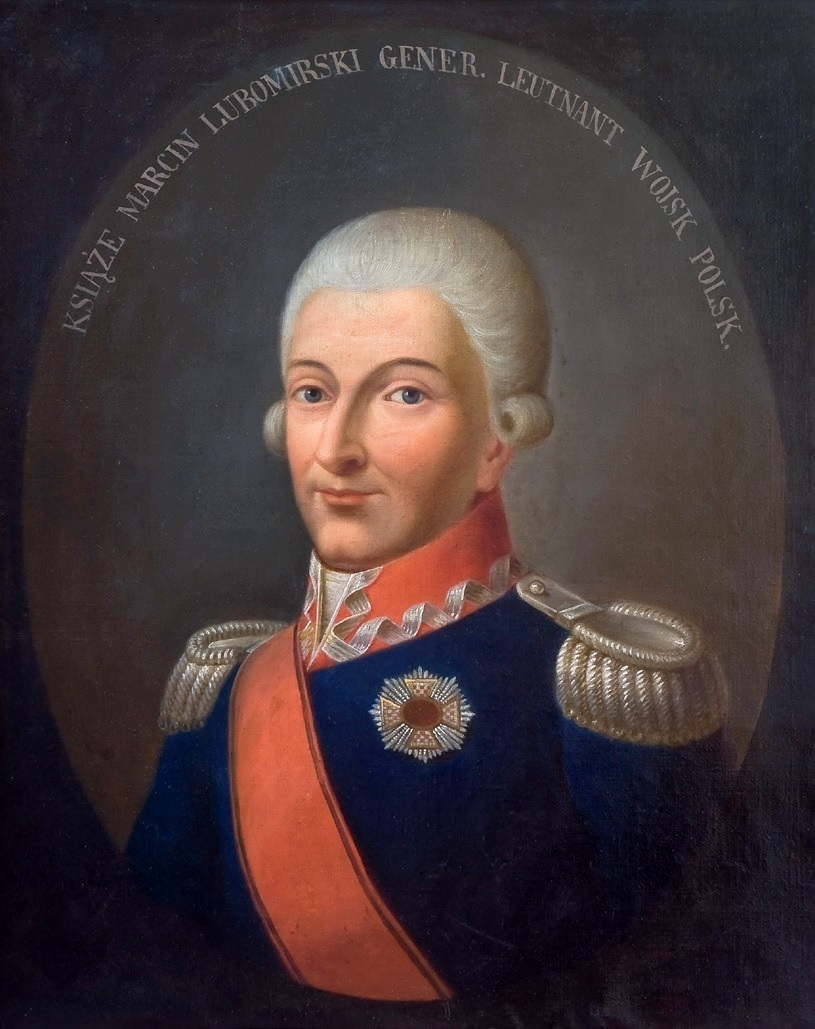
- Portrait of Jerzy Marcin Lubomirski, from Museum in Rzeszów

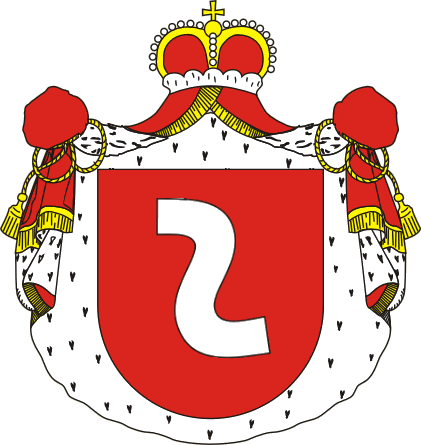
- Coat of arms: Lubomirski
- Born: 24 October 1738; Kraków
- Died: 27 June 1811 (aged 72); Przecław
- Family: Lubomirscy
- Spouses: Anna Maria Hadik von Futak; Honorata Stępkowska; Wilhelmina Albertyna von Seydlitz-Kurzbach; Tekla Łabęcka
- Father: Antoni Benedykt Lubomirski
- Mother: Anna Zofia Ożarowska

Jerzy Marcin Lubomirski (Note: called Marcin Lubomirski in some literature) (24 October 1738, Kraków – 27 June 1811 in Przecław) was a Bar Confederate, general officer of Polish Crown Army (1773), art patron, and diarist (his Diaries were published in 1867).

== Life ==
He was the son of Antoni Benedykt Lubomirski, swordbearer of the Crown, and Anna Zofia Ożarowska. The young prince was schooled at Collegium Nobilium in Warsaw and the Académie de Stanislas in Lunéville. After completing his education, he traveled around Europe and stayed longer in Paris, where, at the age of sixteen, he spent a considerable fortune entrusted to him by his father. Hearing about his son's wasteful life, his father summoned him to Poland and decided to assign his son to a military career. Thanks to various protections, Jerzy Marcin was promoted to the rank of major general. In response, he gathered a band of two hundred robbers and plundered Połonne, the property of his father. He then kidnapped the seventeen-year-old lady-in-waiting of his mother, Anna Weleżyńska, and escaped with her to the estate near Częstochowa. It belonged to his uncle Franciszek Lubomirski, whom he quickly robbed and burned his property.

During the Seven Years' War he fought on Prussia's side on the Czech and Silesian lands against András Hadik. He deserted them to go to the Polish side and set up a camp for his gang of robbers in Kamień near Częstochowa. They offered their robber services to the Russians. The gang attacked mainly Prussian food transports, some of which were handed over to the Russian army, but also organized raids on villages and small towns of Greater Poland and Silesia.

Antoni Benedykt decided to put an end to his son's actions – he entered an agreement with Jan Klemens Branicki and obtained the king's consent to use the crown army against the robbers. The gang was smashed on 29 June 1759 by three regiments of the Crown, after capturing the Stone. The captured robbers, after a very short trial, were hanged in Krakow, and Jerzy Marcin himself was expelled from the army, and sent to Kamieniec Podolski with a life sentence, which, thanks to his father's intervention, was changed to fifteen years. Initially, he was imprisoned in Białystok; in 1760 he was transferred to the Munkacz fortress, and in 1763 to the prison in Buda. Here he met Anna Maria Hadik von Futak, the daughter of the field marshal and the commander of the fortress, Andras Hadik, who, as a future father-in-law, began efforts to free him. After his release in May 1765, the couple got married on 5 June 1765 in Hermannstadt. In 1770, his daughter, Łucja Franciszka, was born.

After returning to Poland, he took over the property of his father, who died in 1761. Under infamy, he did not participate in public life until the outbreak of the Bar Confederation.

After the outbreak of the Bar Confederation, he sided with the Confederates, providing them with significant funds. He helped organize troops in the Sandomierz province and in the Sanok region, from where he set off to help Krakow together with Piotr Potocki and Jakub Ignacy Bronicki. After losing the Battle of Maków, he took refuge in Hungary, which resulted in numerous accusations of treason and cowardice. In the spring of 1769 he returned to fighting, cooperating, among others with Casimir Pulaski.

He took part in Partition Sejm in 1773, and he was said to be the one removing Tadeusz Rejtan from the door. As a servant of the Russian ambassador Otto Magnus von Stackelberg he became a member of the Permanent Council. He was a member of Sejm in 1776 representing Kiev Voivodeship.

After many adventures he moved to Warsaw and became a patron of the arts. Since 1775 he was a part of the Warsaw theatrical scene, e.g. funding a ballet „Sąd Parysa" (Judgement of Paris) in 1775. Having divorced Anna Maria, he married Honorata Stępkowska in 1777. They lived together for a short time, but Jerzy Marcin allowed a divorce only in 1782. In the same year he caused an uproar described in newspapers, cross-dressing at a Warsaw costume ball in 1782. It was not his only scandalous behavior – Michał Modzelewski claimed that the prince had "nasty Eastern quirks" (Note: Polish 18th century euphemism for describing homosexual behaviors, linked to the belief that they were invented in Turkey) and openly kept a boy Cossack as his favourite, for whom he bought a nobility from the king. Nowadays the prince's numerous affairs with women and men (his other lover was a secretary of Janusz Aleksander Sanguszko, Karol Szydłoski) could be interpreted as bisexual.

After 1783 Jerzy Marcin was married to Wilhelmina Albertyna, daughter of Friedrich Wilhelm von Seydlitz. They divorced before June 1785, when Wilhelmina married Wojciech Mączyński. In 1785 Jerzy Marcin was in charge of the court theater of Stanisław August Poniatowski. Soon he limited his theatre work and organised only concerts and balls. Eventually he sold most of his goods and went to Frankfurt am Main in 1789, where he became close to Jacob Frank and his sect, participating even in Frank's funeral. During his Frankfurt period he married for the last time, to Frankist Tekla Łabęcka (who died in Warsaw in 1830). Jerzy Marcin spent his last years alone in poverty in Przecław, where he died

He inherited Mniszew lands from his uncle and a huge fortune and lands from his father (including Dobra Połonne, Międzyrzec, Lubar, Janowiec Castle). He dissipated the fortune, and he sold Mniszew] to Magdalena Agnieszka Sapieżyna before his bankruptcy. According to a legend he lost Janowiec castle to Mikołaj Piaskowski.
