= Württemberg-Winnental =

18th century German noble house

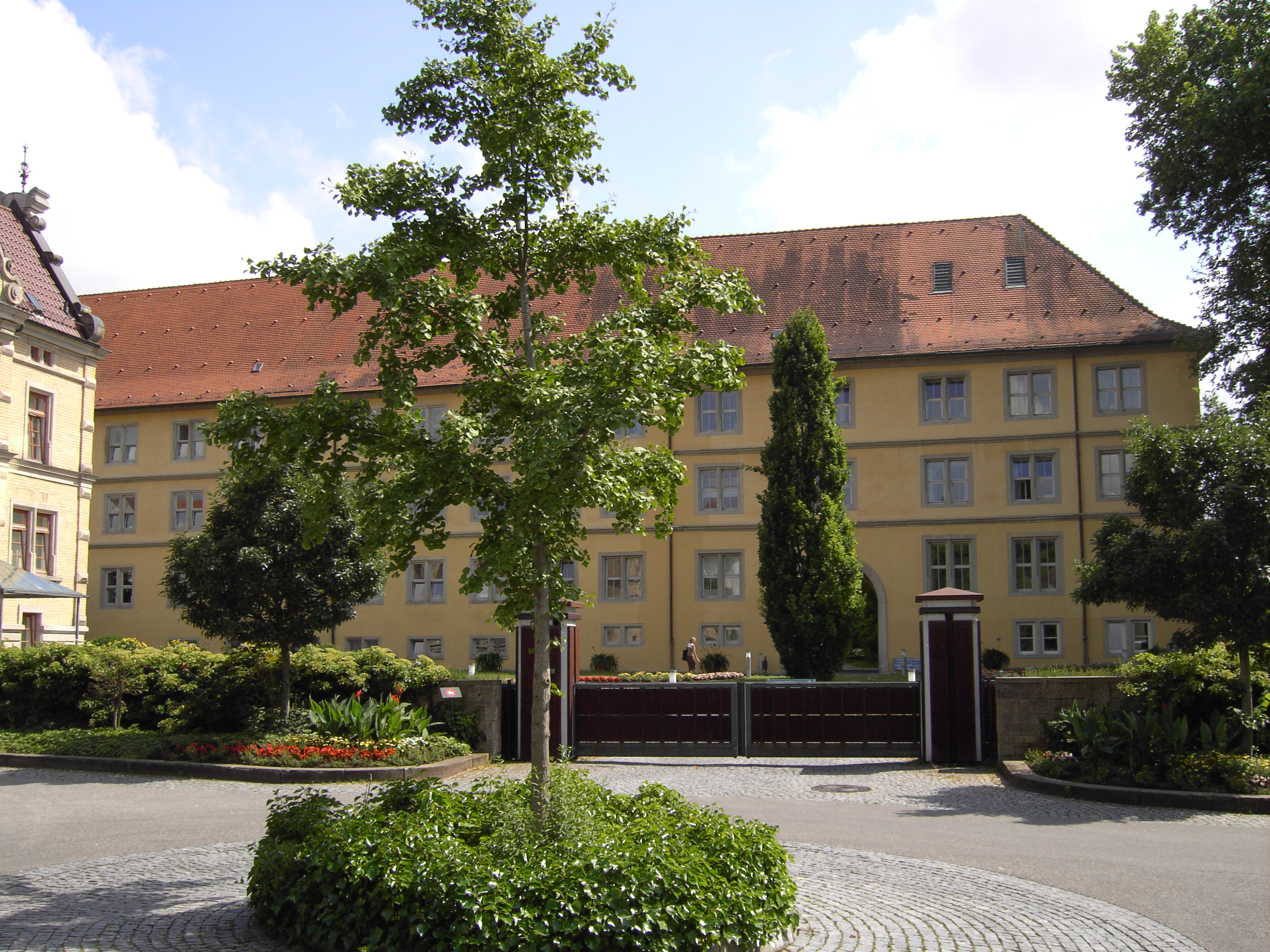
The Schloss Winnental in Winnenden

Württemberg-Winnental was a branch of the House of Württemberg. It only existed from 1677 to 1733 and was based at the Schloss Winnental in Winnenden.

Eberhard III, Duke of Württemberg arranged immediately before his death that after his death each of his sons should receive a princely residence and a 'Paragium', an arrangement under which his third son Frederick Charles was granted the Schloss Winnental, where he began the Württemberg-Winnental line. At the age of 25 he was granted all his father's powers. The line's existence ended when Frederick Charles' son Charles Alexander succeeded to the main line of the House of Württemberg.
