= Neuenstadt =

Neuenstadt may refer to the following places:

- Neuenstadt, German name for La Neuveville, Switzerland
- Neuenstadt am Kocher, town in Baden-Württemberg, Germany

== See also ==
- Württemberg-Neuenstadt, name of two branch lines of the ducal House of Württemberg
