= Duchess Frederica of Württemberg (abbess) =

Lady superior (died 1781)

- Abbess of Vallø stift
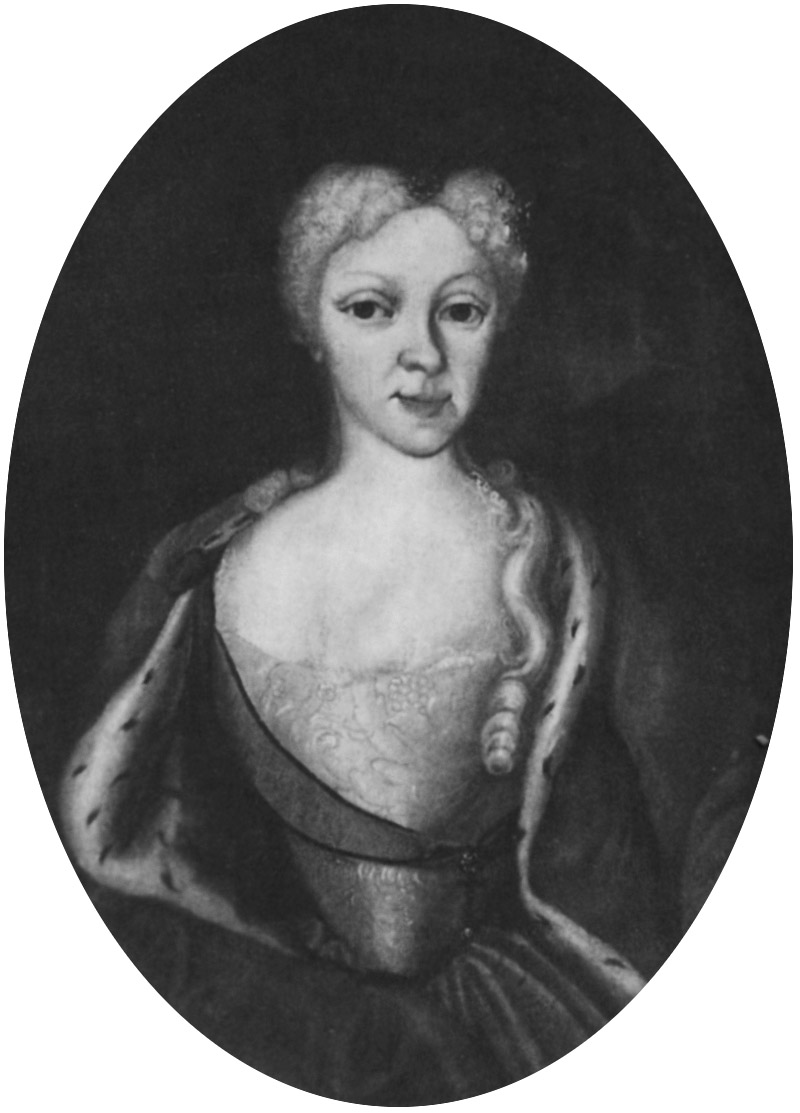
- Born: 1699
- Died: 1781 (aged 81–82)
- House: Württemberg-Neuenstadt
- Father: Frederick Augustus, Duke of Württemberg-Neuenstadt
- Mother: Albertine Sophie Esther, Countess of Eberstein
- Occupation: Lady-in-waiting

Duchess Frederica of Württemberg (1699–1781) was a German abbess. She was the favorite of the queen of Denmark, Sophie Magdalene of Brandenburg-Kulmbach, and the Abbess of the Danish Protestant convent Vallø stift in 1738–1743.

== Life ==
She was born to Frederick Augustus, Duke of Württemberg-Neuenstadt and Albertine Sophie Esther, Countess of Eberstein (1661-1728).

She never married, and after the death of her father in 1716, she lived with her mother in Gochsheim Castle until her mother's death in 1728. She was, for a time, lady-in-waiting to Johanna Elisabeth of Baden-Durlach. Frederica was a favorite of the Danish queen, whose favoritism of Germans was disliked, and was awarded by her with her order and the lucrative post of abbess. She was not popular at the Danish royal court, where she was disliked because of her sharp tongue and was involved in a conflict with the queen's sister, Sophie Caroline of Brandenburg-Kulmbach. In 1743, she left Denmark and returned to the castle in Neuenstadt.

She was a Dame of the Ordre de l'Union Parfaite.
