= Frederick, Duke of Württemberg-Neuenstadt =

German aristocrat

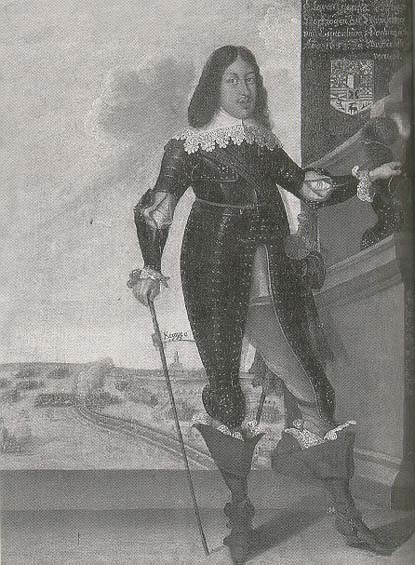
Frederick, Duke of Württemberg-Neuenstadt

Frederick of Württemberg-Neuenstadt (19 December 1615, in Stuttgart – 24 March 1682, in Neuenstadt am Kocher) was a Duke of Württemberg and the founder of the second branch line of the Duchy of Württemberg-Neuenstadt.

== Life ==
Frederick was the third son of Johann Frederick, the 7th Duke of Württemberg and Barbara Sophie of Brandenburg. When his father died in 1628, his elder brother became Eberhard III, Duke of Württemberg.

Frederick went at the age of 13 to study in Tübingen. In 1630 he went on a Grand Tour via Strasbourg, Basel and Montpellier but broke it off in Lyon due to severe fever.

In 1638, his brother Eberhard III was given back certain parts of the lost duchy of Württemberg by Ferdinand III, Holy Roman Emperor while Frederick was drawn into war service. After the Peace of Westphalia, which led to the full restoration of Württemberg, Eberhard entered into a Fürstbrüderlicher Vergleich – a mutual agreement made between ducal brothers. Duke Eberhard III left his brother Frederick possession of Neuenstadt, Möckmühl and Weinsberg, although this was without sovereignty which remained with Eberhard.

Frederick restored Neuenstadt castle after it suffered damage in the Thirty Years' War and took up residence there in 1652. On 7 June 1653, he married Clara Augusta, a daughter of Augustus the Younger of Brunswick.

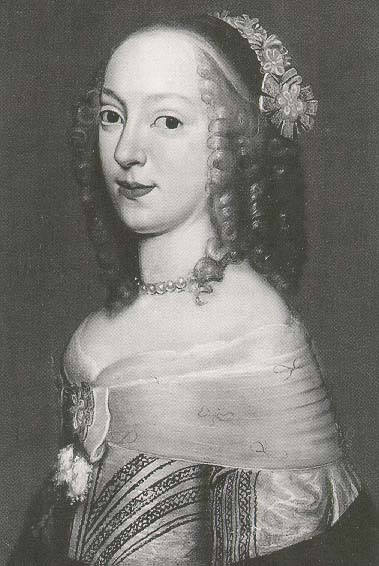
Clara Augusta of Brunswick-Lüneburg (1632-1700)

The couple had 12 children in just 15 years of which only four lived to mature adulthood:

1. Frederick Augustus (1654–1716)
2. Ulrich (1655–1655), died in infancy
3. Eberhard (1656–1656), died in infancy
4. Albrecht (1657–1670), died in adolescence
5. Sophie Dorothea (1658–1681)
6. Ferdinand William (1659–1701)
7. Anton Ulrich (1661–1680), died in adolescence
8. Barbara Auguste (1663–1664), died in infancy
9. Eleonore Charlotte (1664–1666), died in early childhood
10. Christopher (1666), died in infancy
11. Carl Rudolf (1667–1742)
12. Anna Eleonore (1669–1670), died in infancy

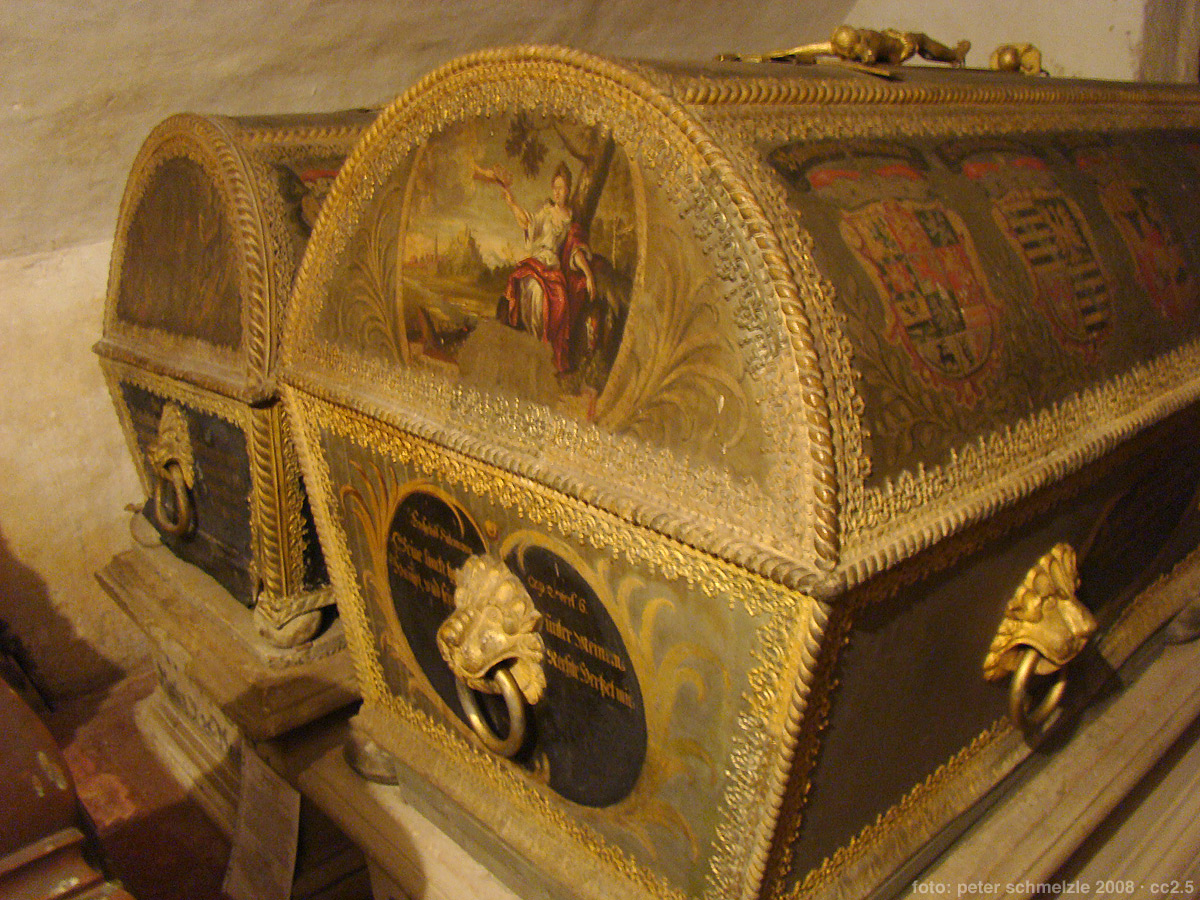
The metal sarcophagus of Frederick (back) and his wife Clara Augusta (front) in the crypt of Neuenstadt church

Duke Frederick died after a long illness on 24 March 1682 and was buried in Neuenstadt church. He was succeeded by his eldest son, Frederick August.

== Ancestry ==
Ancestors of Frederick, Duke of Württemberg-Neuenstadt

8. George I of Württemberg-Mömpelgard
4. Frederick I, Duke of Württemberg
9. Barbara of Hesse
2. Johann Frederick, Duke of Württemberg
10. Joachim Ernest, Prince of Anhalt
5. Sibylla of Anhalt
11. Agnes of Barby-Mühlingen
1. Frederick, Duke of Württemberg-Neuenstadt
12. John George, Elector of Brandenburg
6. Joachim Frederick, Elector of Brandenburg
13. Sophie of Legnica
3. Barbara Sophie of Brandenburg
14. John, Margrave of Brandenburg-Küstrin
7. Catherine of Brandenburg-Küstrin
15. Catherine of Brunswick-Wolfenbüttel

== Bibliography ==
- (in German) Harald Schukraft: Kleine Geschichte des Hauses Württemberg. Silberburg Publishing, Tübingen, 2006, ISBN 978-3-87407-725-5

Frederick, Duke of Württemberg-Neuenstadt House of Württemberg Born: 19 December 1615 Died: 24 March 1682
Regnal titles
Preceded by None	Duke of Württemberg-Neuenstadt; 1649–1682	Succeeded by Frederick Augustus
