= Württemberg-Neuenstadt =

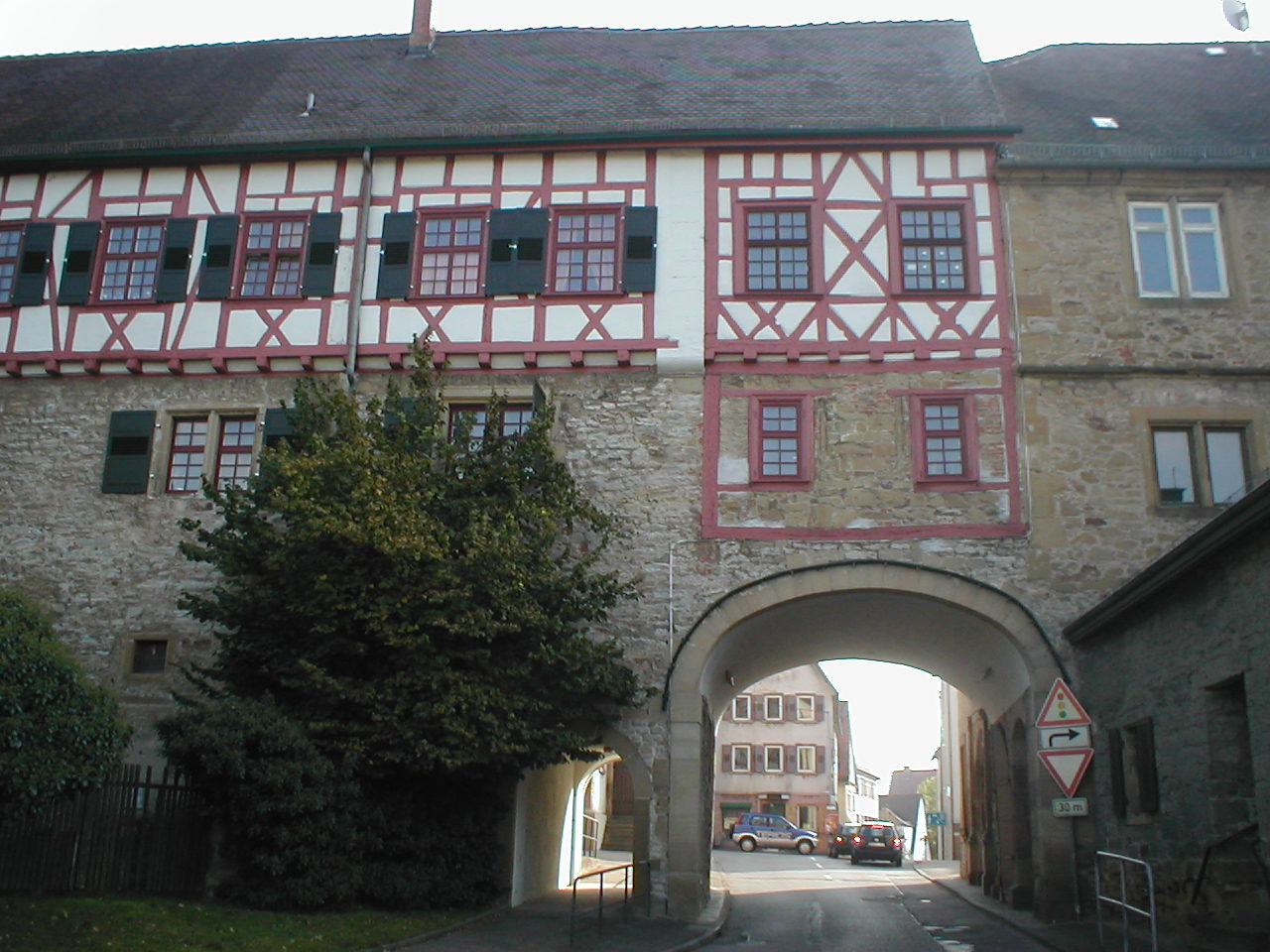
Neuenstadt Castle

Württemberg-Neuenstadt was the name of two branch lines of the ducal House of Württemberg in the 17th and 18th century. It was named after the town of residence, Neuenstadt.

== First branch line ==
The first branch line of this name came into existence after a Fürstbrüderlicher Vergleich – a mutual agreement made between ducal brothers on 7 June 1617 (Julian calendar: 28 May). Under the agreement, the sons of Duke Friedrich I split the inheritance such that the eldest son, Johann Frederick, assumed borony over the Duchy of Württemberg while his remaining brothers assumed possession of other ducal properties. The second youngest son, Frederick Achilles, was bequeathed Neuenstadt Castle and an annual endowment of 10,000 guilder. After the death of Frederick Achilles in 1631, who was still unmarried, the castle returned to the main line of the duchy.

== Second branch line ==
The second branch line came into existence in 1649, after the restitution of Württemberg following the Thirty Years' War. Under the inheritance agreement of 7 October 1649 (27 September under the Julian calendar) Duke Eberhard III left his brother Frederick possession of Neuenstadt, Möckmühl and Weinsberg, although this was without sovereignty as this was passed on to Eberhard.

Duke Frederick was married to Clara Augusta, daughter of August the Younger of Brunswick. The couple brought 12 children into the world, of which three male children survived to adulthood: Frederick August, Ferdinand Wilhelm and Carl Rudolf. Duke Frederick died in 1682, outlived by his widow who resided in Neuenstadt and her widow's residence of Weißenhof by Weinsberg until 1700 when she died.

The eldest son, Frederick August assumed the inheritance of Frederick. In 1679 he married Countess Albertine Sophie Esther, the last remaining daughter from the line of the Counts of Eberstein. The couple moved into Gochsheim Castle which they had inherited in Kraichgau. In 1679 the couple retreated to Neuenstadt to avoid the War of the Palatinian Succession. During his absence, Gochsheim was sacked and razed to the ground by the French. The castle was reconstructed after the war ended in 1700, after which Gochsheim once again became a ducal residence. Frederick August died in 1716. On the death of his wife in 1728, Gochsheim returned to the main ducal line.

Frederick August's marriage resulted in the birth of 14 children of which only three daughters survived. Of Frederick August's brothers, Ferdinand Wilhelm had already died in 1701 so the Neuenstadt inheritance passed to Carl Rudolf in 1716. Carl Rudolf also became regent for a short time of the main ducal line of Württemberg for the underaged Duke Karl Eugen. When Carl Rudolf died in 1742 the male lineage of Württemberg-Neuenstadt finally disappeared. The only survivors of the duchy, two daughters, lived in Neuenstadt Castle until the line disappeared once and for all with the death of Friederike, at which point Neuenstadt permanently lost its status as a royal residence.

== Further information ==
=== References ===
- Harald Schukraft: Kleine Geschichte des Hauses Württemberg. Silberburg-Verlag, Tübingen, 2006, ISBN 978-3-87407-725-5
