= Friedrich Wilhelm Retz =

German entrepreneur in Meiji Era Japan

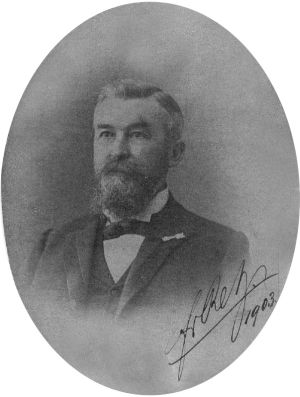
- Born: 29 March 1845; Neuenstadt
- Died: 16 June 1923 (aged 78); Yokohama
- Citizenship: German
- Occupations: Businessman, diplomat, watchmaker
- Known for: Founder of Retz & Co.

Friedrich Wilhelm Retz (29 March 1845 – 16 June 1923) was a German entrepreneur and watchmaker in the early days of Meiji Era in Japan and honorary consul for Holland, Norway and Sweden.

He was one of the most important European personalities during the Meiji era in Japan.

== Career overview ==
Friedrich Wilhelm Retz arrived in Japan in October 1872, and worked for the Swiss watchmaking company Schwartz & Co. based in Yokohama and owned by watchmaker Eulogius Schwartz.

After just two years, he founded his own company in 1874 under the name F.Retz & Co., also based in Yokohama.

He began importing watches from Swiss manufactures and retailing them in Japan. The business developed well due to high demand. When his former employer Schwartz gave up his business in 1876, Retz took over his business operation in Yokohama.

In 1881, he began expanding his operations into different trading businesses, renaming his company Retz, Gröhser & Co.

Amongst other deals, he became the general representative of the Actien beer brewery Coburg for Japan. His brother Carl Ludwig Retz managed the brewery in Coburg as a master brewer.

Another venture in which Retz invested was the steam shipping business, acting as an agent for the Austro-Hungarian Lloyds steam shipping company. With this partnership he pursued the goal of being able to establish himself in the field of overseas export-import business between Swiss-Hungary-Austria and Japan.

In 1891 he bought Fritz Denni's watch factory in La Caux-de-Fonds (Neuchâtel), Switzerland, and opened a new business branch of his company in Kobe in 1895. He put the management of the business area in the hands of his nephew Wilhelm Retz (son of his brother Wilhelm).

In the 1920s, Retz fell ill. He died on 16 June 1923 in Yokohama after a serious illness. He was buried in the Yokohama Foreigners Cemetery.

== Family ==
Friedrich Wilhelm Retz married Adelheid née Vanek in 1854, from Budapest (Hungary), who also lived in Yokohama, and with whom he had four children: Adele Marie (born in 1875), Luise (born in 1876), Friedrich Wilhelm Karl (born in 1891) and Paula Sophie (born in 1882), all of whom were born in Yokohama.

Shortly after the birth of their fourth child, Adelheid Retz, or Adele as she was called, the family traveled to Germany in 1883, but returned to Yokohama in 1892.

His daughter Paula Sophie (1882–1964) married Richard Schmidt-Scharff (1871–1954), a businessman in Japan, in 1905.

== Honors ==
In 1890, Retz was appointed knight of the Imperial Austrian Order of Franz Joseph.

== Books ==
- Nana Miyata: Dr. Hans Kühne, deutscher Konsul in Yokohama 1908–1914 und die OAG. Mitteilungen der OAG Nr. 6/2018
- Biografische Daten über Friedrich Retz, OAG, in: Archiv der OAG Nr. 1600
- Biografie über Friedrich Wilhelm Retz, Meiji-Projekt, in: http://www.meiji-portraits.de/meiji_portraits_r.html#20090527093450609_1_2_2_44_1
