= Frederick Augustus, Duke of Württemberg-Neuenstadt =

Duke of Württemberg (1654–1716)

Frederick Augustus
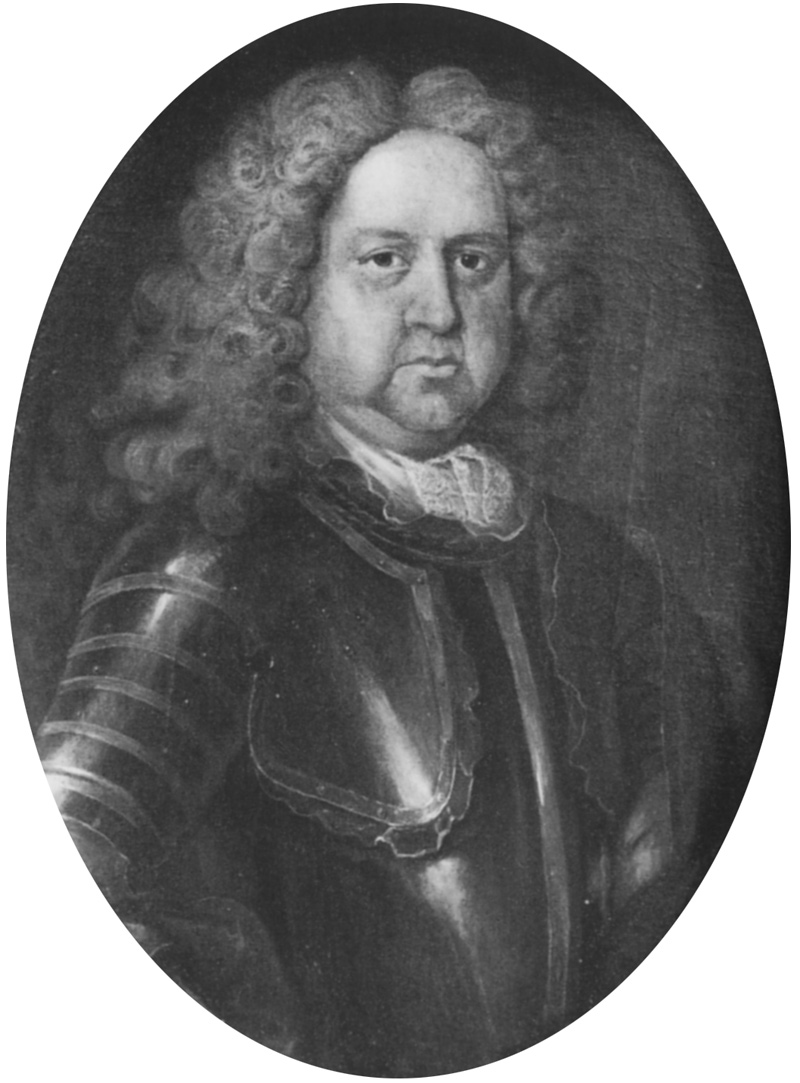

Duke of Württemberg-Neuenstadt
- Reign: 1682–1716
- Predecessor: Frederick, Duke of Württemberg-Neuenstadt
- Successor: Carl Rudolf, Duke of Württemberg-Neuenstadt
- Born: 12 March 1654; Neuenstadt am Kocher
- Died: 6 August 1716 (aged 62); Gochsheim
- Spouse: Countess Albertine Sophie Esther of Eberstein
- Issue: Duchess Frederica of Württemberg
- House: Württemberg-Neuenstadt
- Father: Frederick, Duke of Württemberg-Neuenstadt
- Mother: Clara Augusta of Brunswick

Frederick Augustus of Württemberg-Neuenstadt (12 March 1654, in Neuenstadt am Kocher – 6 August 1716, in Gochsheim) was Duke of Württemberg and Duke of Württemberg-Neuenstadt.

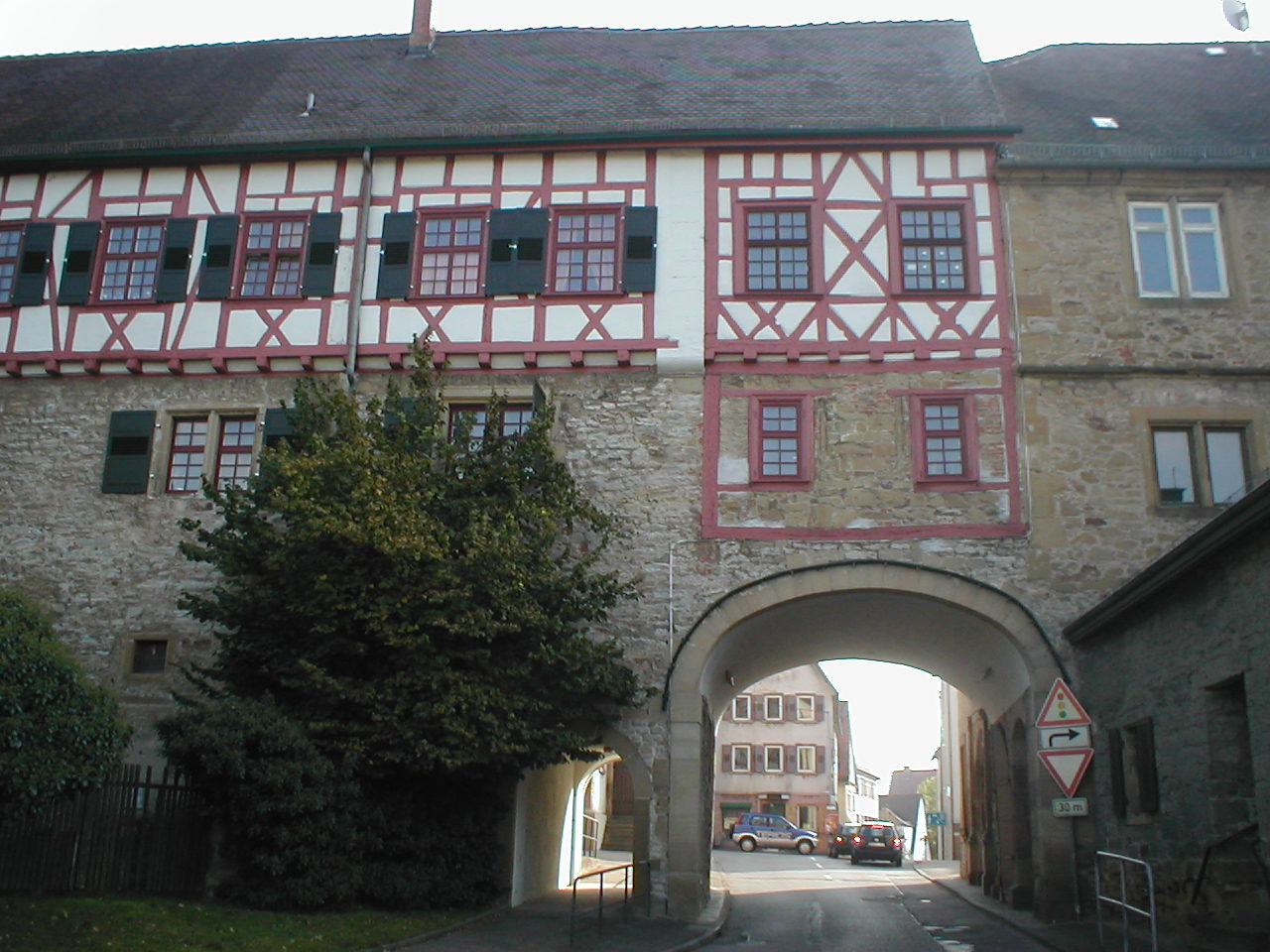
Neuenstadt Castle

== Life ==
Frederick Augustus was the firstborn child of Duke Frederick of Neuenstadt, who established the second branch line of the Duchy of Württemberg-Neuenstadt. His wife was Clara Augusta of Brunswick. The branch line of Württemberg-Neuenstadt held responsibility for the town of Neuenstadt am Kocher, Möckmühl and parts of Weinsberg. They bore the title of dukes although they held no state sovereignty, which remained within the main Duchy of Württemberg.

In 1674, the state became embroiled in the Franco-Dutch War. Frederick Augustus sided with Brunswick-Lüneburg, joining their regiment as a Rittmeister (a commissioned cavalry officer in charge of a squadron). He was involved in a number of key battles, including the Battle of Konzer Brucke outside Trier, in which the horses he was riding were killed three times. Before the end of the war, his father called for his return in order to name him successor to the duchy and remove him from subsequent danger.

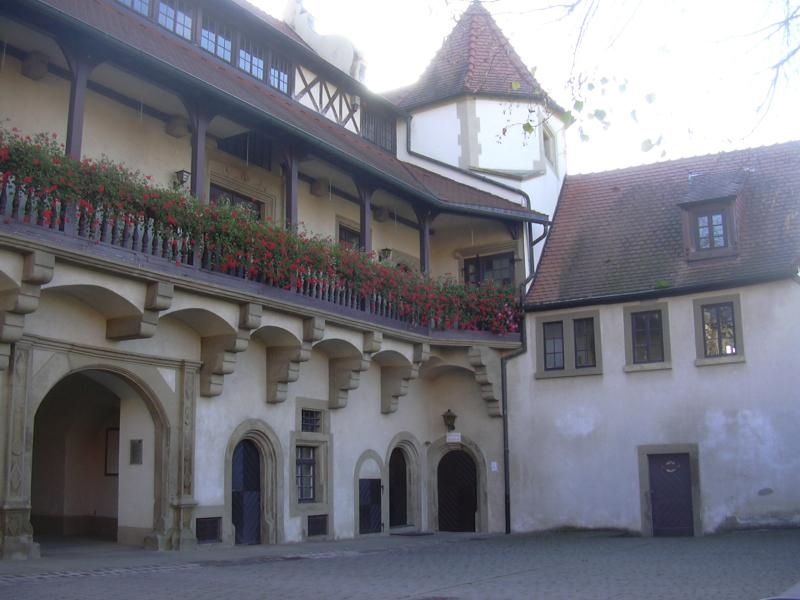
The inner courtyard of Gochsheim Castle which was rebuilt by Frederick Augustus in 1700

On 9 February 1679, Frederick Augustus married Countess Albertine Sophie Esther of Eberstein (20 May 1661 – 24 May 1728), the last remaining member of the House of Eberstein (now known as Alt-Eberstein). This brought him ownership of the Kraichgau towns such as Gochsheim, Waldangelloch and properties along the border with Lorraine. The newlyweds had Gochsheim Castle renovated and used it as their residence from 1682 onwards.

Frederick Augustus's father died in March of the same year, leaving his son to take on the business of running the duchy. In 1689, French troops crossed the Rhine river during a campaign of the War of the Grand Alliance. Frederick Augustus withdrew to the northeast corner of his duchy, taking up residence in Neuenstadt. In his absence, the town and castle in Gochsheim were almost completely destroyed by the French army.

It was not until the Treaty of Ryswick in 1697 that reconstruction work started again and Frederick Augustus brought in 220 Waldensians and Huguenots which he settled in a specially planned town coined “Augustustadt” (Augustus town) to the north of Gochsheim. The project ran into one difficulty after another and enjoyed mediocre success such that most settlers soon moved on again. Despite this, the castle was ready for occupation again in 1700.

Duke Frederick Augustus died of dysentery on 6 August 1716 in Gochsheim. His grave still stands in the Martinskirche church in Gochsheim, next to his wife, who died in 1728. Gochsheim became an obsolete fiefdom. As the couple had no surviving male children, Frederick Augustus’s brother, Carl Rudolf, succeeded him as Duke of Württemberg-Neuenstadt.

== Family ==
During his marriage, Frederick Augustus fathered 14 children of which only three daughters survived infancy:

1. Frederick Kasimir (7 October 1680 – 9 October 1680), lived one day.
2. Ludwig Frederick (1 November 1681 – 9 November, 1681), lived eight days.
3. Unnamed daughter (born and died 9 March 1683).
4. Frederick Samuel (11 May 1684 – 23 May 1684), lived twelve days.
5. Unnamed daughter (born and died 3 July 1685).
6. Augustus Frederick (4 April 1687 – 21 July 1687), lived three months.
7. Karl (26 December 1688 – 19 March 1689), lived two months.
8. Adam (30 May 1690 – 3 July 1690), lived one month.
9. Auguste Sofie (24 September 1691 – 1 March 1743), married on 5 December 1709 to Count Frederick Eberhard of Hohenlohe-Kirchberg. No issue.
10. Eleonore Wilhelmine Charlotte (24 January 1694 – 11 August 1751), unmarried and childless.
11. Unnamed daughter (born and died 21 November 1695).
12. Unnamed son (born and died 29 August 1697).
13. Friederike (27 July 1699 – 8 May 1781), Abbess of Wallö (Walloe). Unmarried and childless.
14. Frederick (6 July 1701 – 21 October 1701), lived three months.

The duke had autopsies done on all his children to ascertain the reason of death, without success. Historians now believe that their premature deaths were often the result of poor hygiene, spoilt milk and mistakes made during childbirth. Eight of the 14 children are buried in the ducal crypt of the Nikolauskirche in Neuenstadt, including the youngest daughter Friederike, who survived all her siblings, after whose burial the crypt was definitely closed in 1781.

== Bibliography ==
- Christoph Eberlein: Friedrich August (in German). In: Sönke Lorenz, Dieter Mertens, Volker Press (ed.): Das Haus Württemberg. Ein biographisches Lexikon. Kohlhammer, Stuttgart 1997, ISBN 3-17-013605-4, p. 224.
- Bernhard Kugler (1878). "Friedrich August" . Allgemeine Deutsche Biographie (in German). Vol. 8. Leipzig: Duncker & Humblot. pp. 49–50.
- Gerhard Raff: Hie gut Wirtemberg allewege (in German). Volume 3: Das Haus Württemberg von Herzog Wilhelm Ludwig bis Herzog Friedrich Carl. Hohenheim, Stuttgart/Leipzig 2002, ISBN 3-89850-084-5 ISBN 978-3-943066-11-1, pp. 365–384.
- Harald Schukraft: Kleine Geschichte des Hauses Württemberg (in German). Silberburg Publishing, Tübingen 2006, ISBN 978-3-87407-725-5.

Frederick Augustus, Duke of Württemberg-Neuenstadt House of Württemberg Born: 12 March 1654 Died: 6 August 1716
Regnal titles
Preceded by Frederick	Duke of Württemberg-Neuenstadt; 1682–1716	Succeeded by Carl Rudolf
