= Ferdinand Willem, Duke of Württemberg-Neuenstadt =

Dutch general and noble (1659–1701)

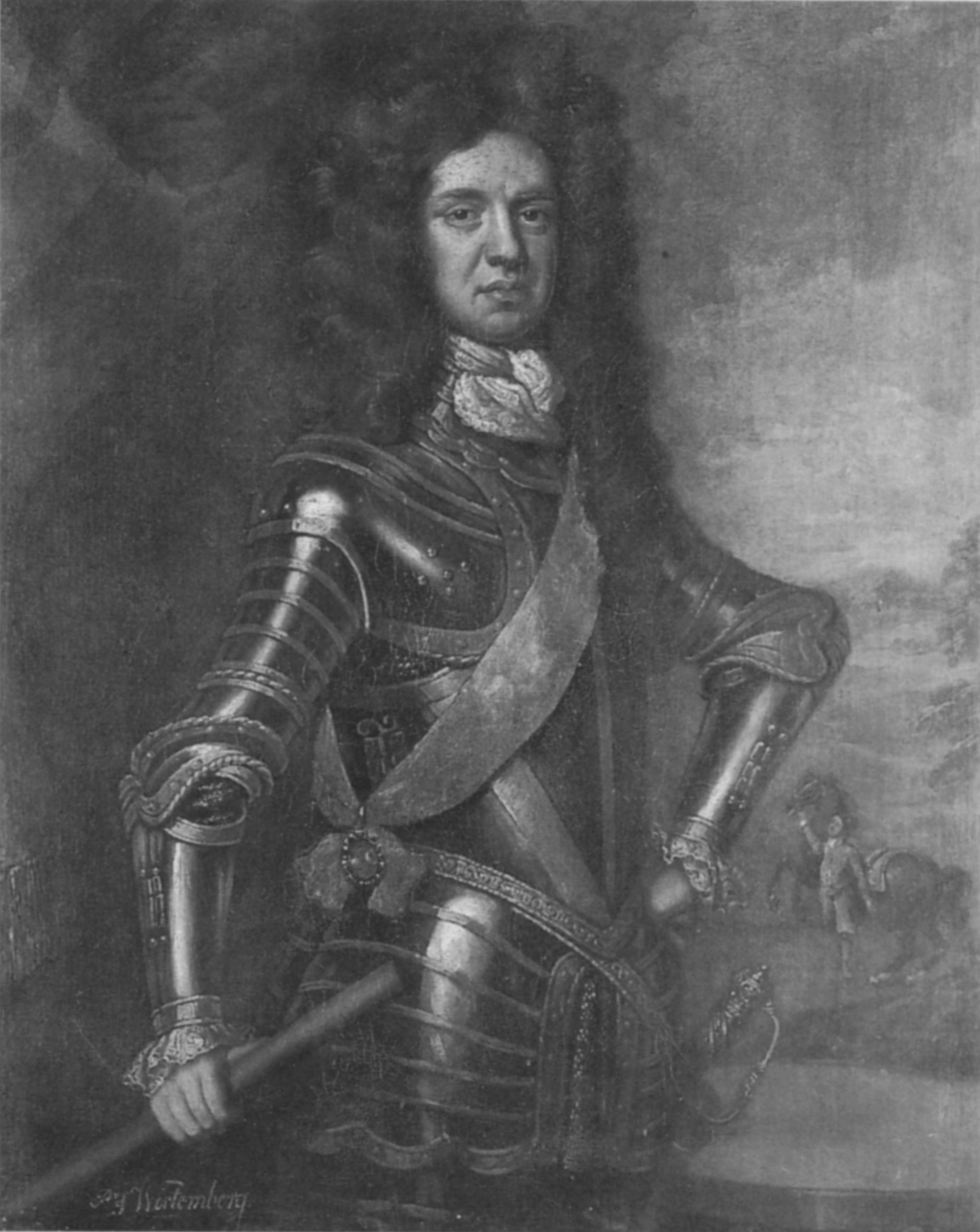
Ferdinand Willem of Württemberg-Neuenstadt

Ferdinand Willem, Duke of Wurttemberg-Neuenstadt (Neuenstadt am Kocher, 12 September 1659 – Sluis, 7 June 1701) was a German general in the Brunswick, Danish, Imperial and Dutch army.

== Biography ==
Ferdinand Wilhelm (original German spelling) was the sixth child and second surviving son of Frederick of Württemberg-Neuenstadt.

He gained his first military experience in the Franco-Dutch War in 1675, where he served alongside his older brother, Frederick Augustus, in a Brunswick-Lüneburg regiment. He then entered Danish service during the Scanian War, where he was promoted to lieutenant general in 1682.

When the Turkish army threatened Vienna in 1683, Ferdinand William joined the army under Duke Charles of Lorraine and fought in the Battle of Kahlenberg, which relieved Vienna. He continued to fight in the Great Turkish War afterward, and was severely wounded in 1685 by a gunshot to the forehead near the fortress of Neuhäusel. Initially, the doctors doubted whether he would survive, but after only 14 days, with his head bandaged, he stood at the head of the Franconian dragoons and led them to storm Neuhäusel. However, Ferdinand William would succumb to the long-term effects of this injury 16 years later.

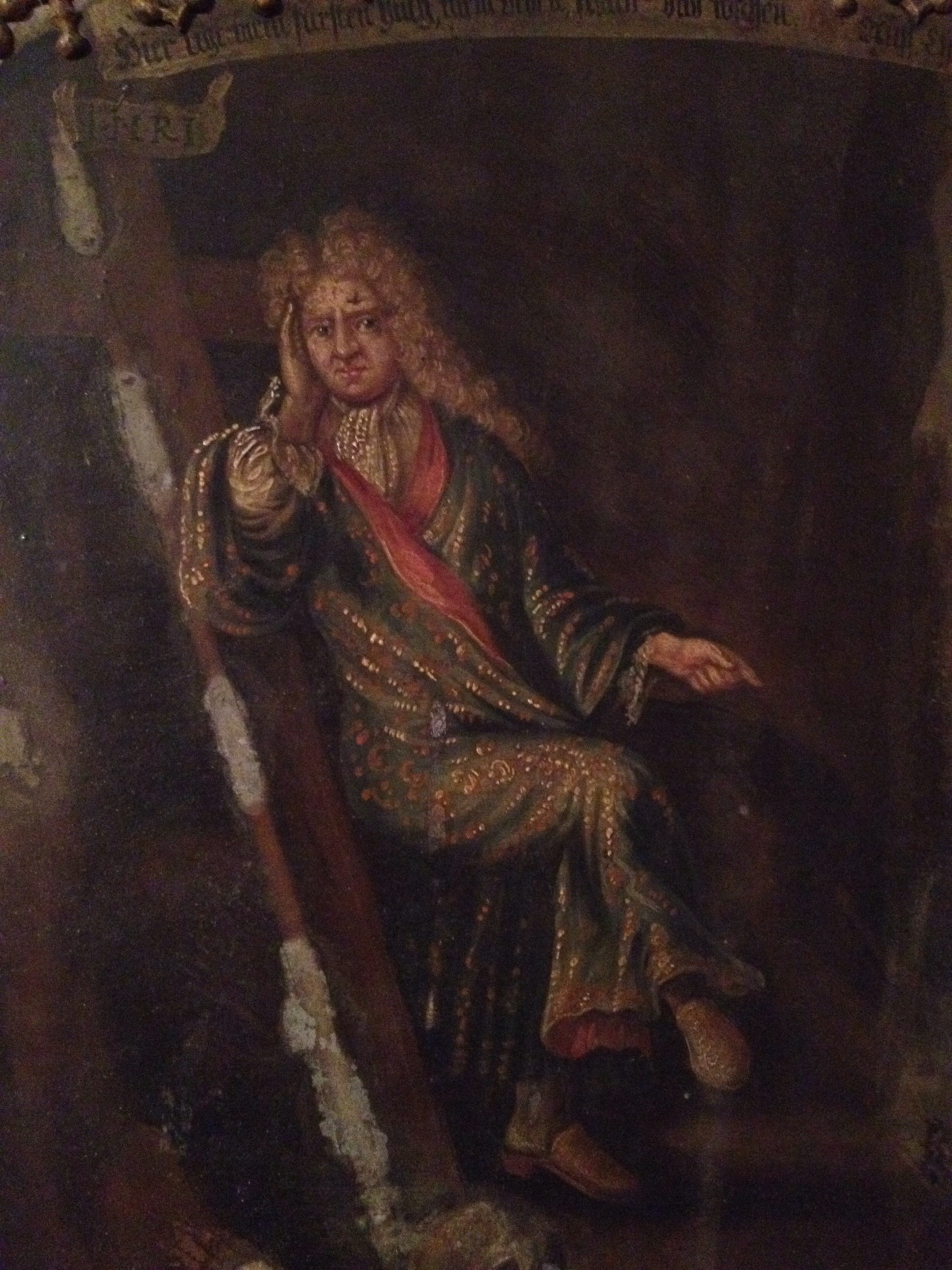
Depiction of Ferdinand Wilhelm of Württemberg-Neuenstadt on his coffin in the St. Nicholas Church in Neuenstadt am Kocher. The deceased is depicted with the wound on his forehead.

In 1688, he re-entered Danish service and received command of the 7,000 men sent to England to aid William III against the Catholic troops under James II. His younger brother, Carl Rudolf, also participated in this campaign. Together, the two brothers fought at the Battle of the Boyne and contributed significantly to the subjugation of Ireland. William III went so far as to say that :
Next to God, the two brothers had contributed most to the victory.

From 1692, Ferdinand William, still in Danish service, was assigned to defend the Netherlands against the French in the Nine Years' War. Although the battles of Steenkerque on 3 August 1692, and Neerwinden on 29 July 1693, were lost, Ferdinand William distinguished himself to such an extent that he was appointed General of the Dutch Infantry and Colonel in the Royal Life Guards as successor of Count Solms, who was killed at the battle.
In 1693 Ferdinand Wilhelm was sent by William III with 16,000 men to raid Artois. The people of Artois eventually paid him 6 million guilders in contributions. This war ended with the Peace of Ryswick in 1697. Ferdinand William was appointed Governor of Sluis and of all Dutch Flanders.

In 1698, serving King Augustus II of Poland as Generalfeldmarschall, he assumed supreme command of the Polish-Saxon troops in Ukraine against the Turks, whom he forced to cede a portion of Podolia to Poland. In 1700, he commanded Danish troops in the Holstein campaign against the Swedes. Afterward, he retired from military service.

Shortly thereafter, he suffered a severe illness resulting from complications from the gunshot wound he had received near Neuhäusel. He died of this illness on 7 June 1701, in Sluis. He was unmarried and left no descendants. He was buried in the crypt of the House of Württemberg-Neuenstadt in St. Nicholas Church in Neuenstadt am Kocher.
