= Carl Rudolf, Duke of Württemberg-Neuenstadt =

German Duke and Military Commander

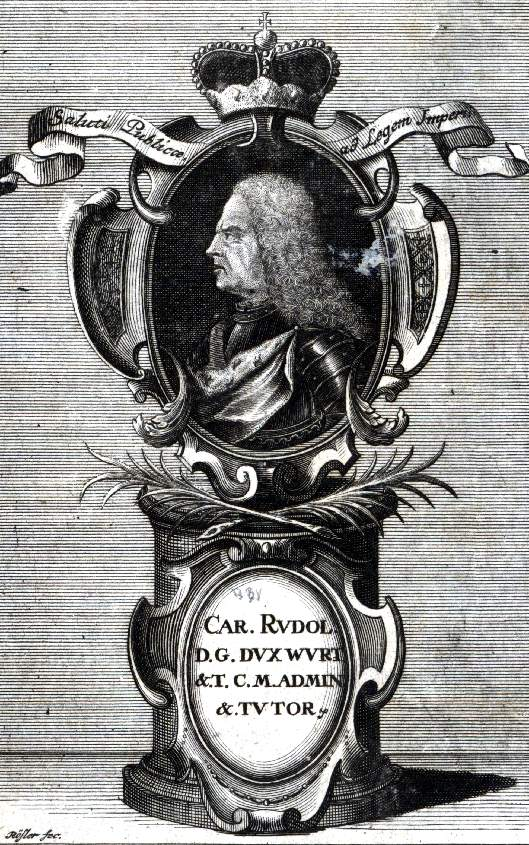
Carl Rudolf

Carl Rudolf (29 May 1667, in Neuenstadt am Kocher – 17 November 1742, in Neuenstadt am Kocher) was the last Duke of Württemberg-Neuenstadt, army commander in Danish service and Field Marshal of the Holy Roman Empire.

== Life ==
Carl Rudolf was the youngest son of Frederick, who had founded the Württemberg-Neuenstadt branch in 1649, and his wife Clara Augusta von Braunschweig. The young Duke studied in Tübingen and Strassburg. His Grand Tour brought him to Geneva, the south of France, the court of Louis XIV, London and northern Germany.

=== Military career ===
Already in 1687 he raised a Württemberger Regiment, to support the Republic of Venice in their war against the Ottoman Empire in Greece. Carl Rudolf personally led a company of 150 men and fought during two years in Morea and Negroponte, until he was shot in the chest during the Siege of Negroponte. He survived, but the bullet remained in his lungs for the rest of life.

When Carl Rudolf returned to Württemberg in the beginning of 1690, the War of the Grand Alliance had already started. Carl Rudolf entered in Danish service and went to Ireland to support the Protestant William of Orange against the deposed Catholic King James II of England. The commander of the Danish troops was Carl Rudolf's elder brother Ferdinand Wilhelm. Both brothers fought in the victorious Battle of the Boyne.

In 1692 both brothers fought the French in Flanders and participated in the battles of Steenkerke and Neerwinden. When the war ended in 1697, the Danish King sent them to present-day Ukraine, where they supported the Polish-Saxon troops in the Polish–Ottoman War (1683–1699) against the Turks. In 1700 they fought in the Great Northern War against Sweden, but Denmark was forced to retreat from the war in the same year.

One year later the War of Spanish Succession broke out, where France was opposed by a British-Dutch-Habsburg coalition. Denmark supported the coalition and Carl Rudolf was sent at the head of an army of 12,000 men to the Netherlands. For his actions in 1702, he was made a member of the highest Danish honour, the Order of the Elephant. In 1704 he led the Danish troops in the Battle of Blenheim. In the Battle of Ramillies (1706) and Malplaquet (1709) he distinguished himself and played an important part in both victories.
By the end of the war, he was in command of the entire Danish Army.

In the meanwhile, Denmark had reentered the Great Northern War and Carl Rudolf was ordered to take Stralsund from the Swedish, which he accomplished in 1715 after a long siege.

=== Ruler in Neuenstadt ===
In 1716 Carl Rudolf's eldest brother Frederick August died. He had ruled Neuenstadt since 1682. Because Frederick August had left no male successors, and the second brother Ferdinand Wilhelm had died in 1701, the Duchy passed to Carl Rudolf. After 25 years in service, he left the Danish army and returned home.

In 1734 he was recalled once more as Generalfeldmarschall of the Holy Roman Empire to defend the Upper Rhine against the French in the War of Polish Succession.

In 1737, the Duke of the main line of the house of Württemberg, Carl Alexander, died unexpectedly in Stuttgart. His son Carl Eugen was only 9 years old, and Carl Rudolf was appointed Regent. Carl Alexander had left the Duchy in a disastrous financial state and was hated by the population. To prevent an uprising, Carl Rudolf accused the Jewish Finance-minister, Joseph Süß Oppenheimer, and had him executed. Shortly after, Carl Rudolf passed on the Regency to Carl Friedrich of Württemberg-Oels, for health reasons.

Carl Rudolf died of catarrh in November 1742, and was buried in the Nikolauskirche in Neuenstadt am Kocher.

Carl Rudolf never married, but lived together with Marie Therese de La Country. They had no children.

Carl Rudolf, Duke of Württemberg-Neuenstadt House of Württemberg Born: 29 May 1667 Died: 17 November 1742
Regnal titles
Preceded by Frederick August	Duke of Württemberg-Neuenstadt; 1716–1742	Extinct
