= Gochsheim Castle =

Royal residence in Germany

Coordinates: 49°6′13″N 8°44′47″E

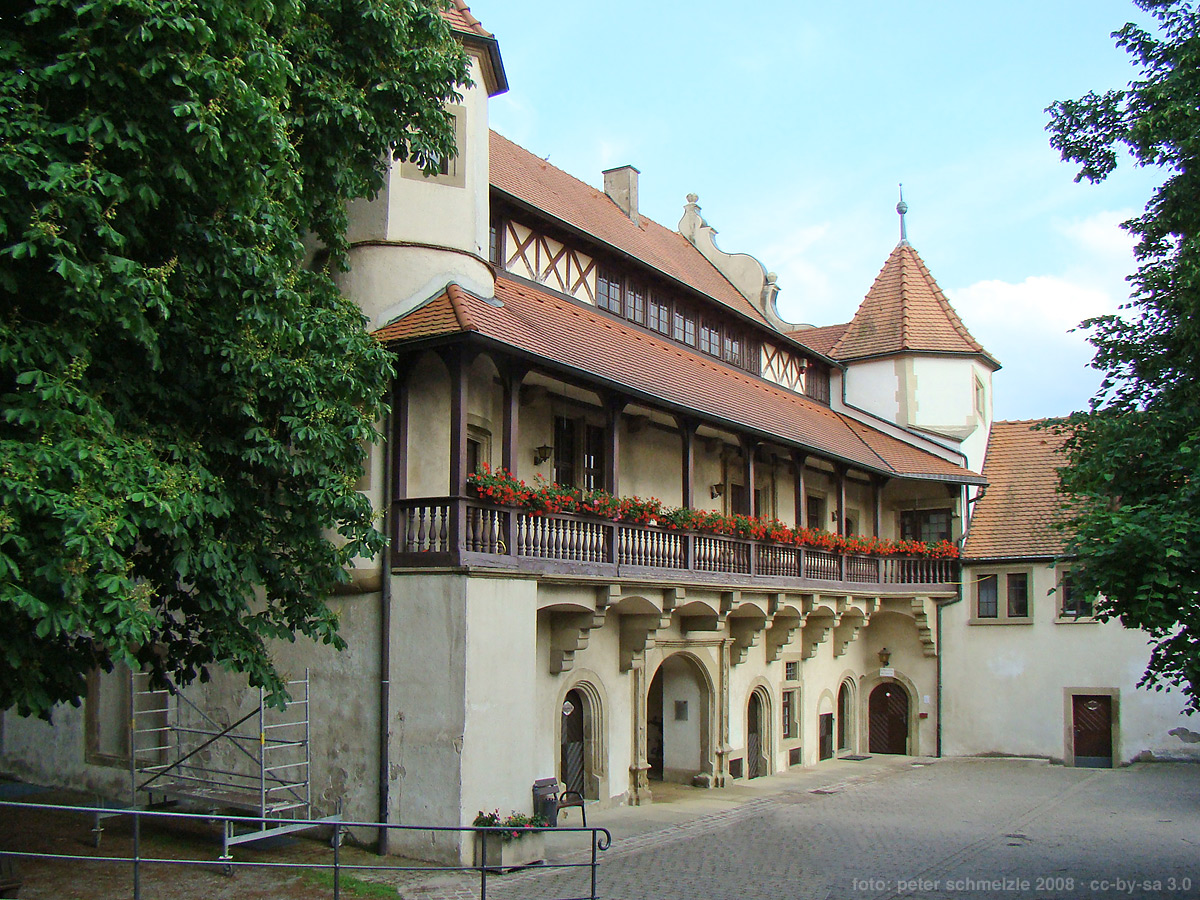
The inner courtyard

Gochsheim Castle, Baden-Württemberg

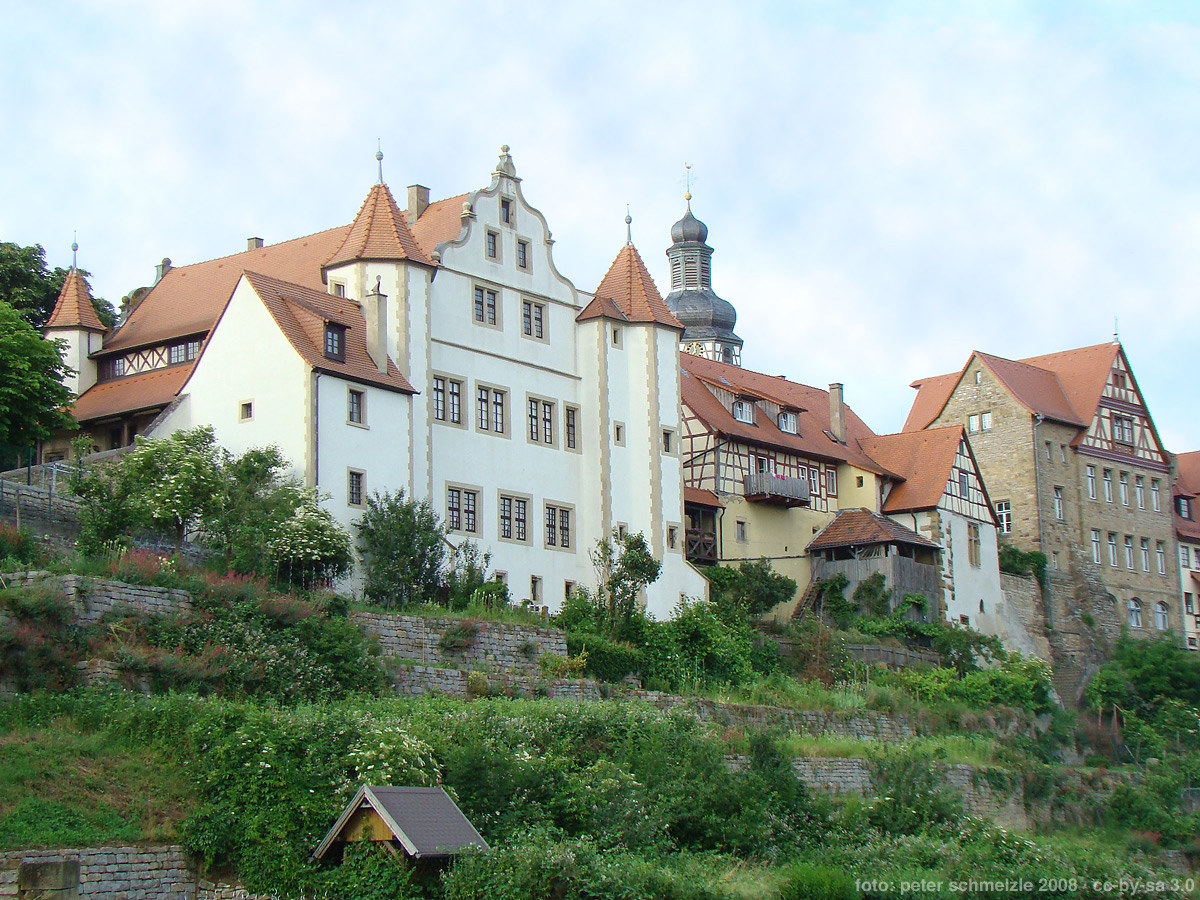
Overall castle view

Gochsheim Castle (German: Graf-Eberstein-Schloss, or the Castle of Count Eberstein) is an old royal residence in the Kraichtal area of Baden-Württemberg, in the north-eastern part of Karlsruhe, Germany. It currently houses a museum and holds around 100 works of local artist Karl Hubbuch who died in 1979.

The castle fell into the ownership of Frederick August of Württemberg-Neuenstadt after his marriage on 9 February 1679 to Countess Albertine Sophie Esther, the last remaining member of the family of the Counts of Eberstein (now known as Alt-Eberstein). The newlyweds had the castle renovated and used it as their residence from 1682 onwards but it was ransacked by French invaders during a campaign of the War of the Grand Alliance, during which Frederick August withdrew to take up residence in Neuenstadt.

The castle was reconstructed after the war ended in 1700, after which Gochsheim once again became a ducal residence. Frederick August died in 1716. On the death of his wife in 1728, Gochsheim returned to the main ducal line.

The upper floor now houses the world's largest collection of irons, around 1,300 examples collected by Heinrich Sommer, as well as works by theologian, local historian and artist Dr. Carl Krieger and Margarethe Krieger.
