= Möckmühl =

- Town
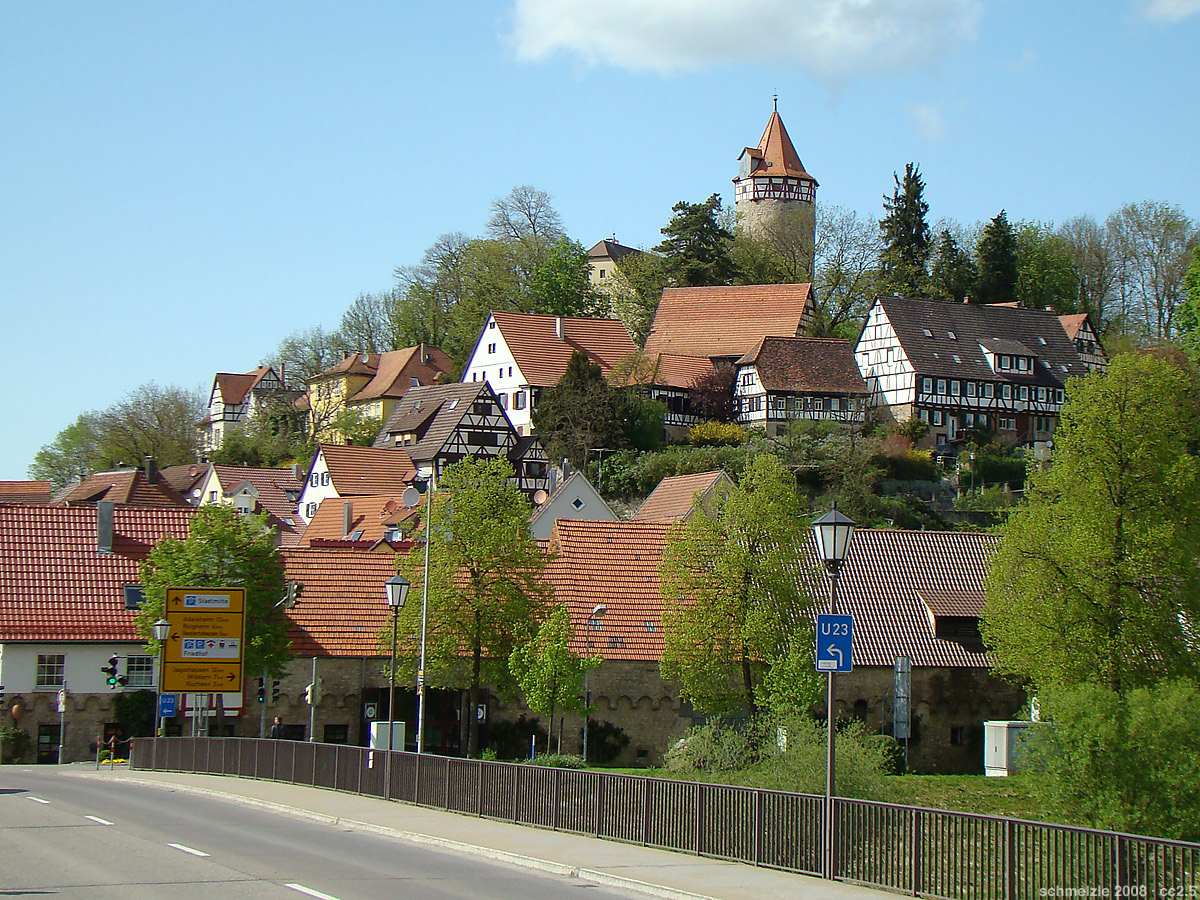
- Möckmühl viewed from southeast

- Coat of arms

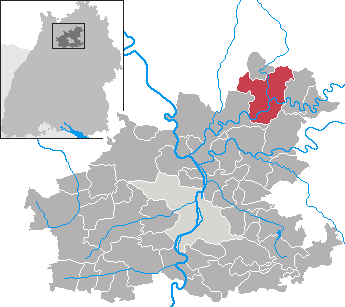
- Location of Möckmühl within Heilbronn district
- Interactive map of Möckmühl
- Location within Germany Location within Baden-Württemberg
- Coordinates: 49°19′N 9°21′E
- Country: Germany
- State: Baden-Württemberg
- Admin. region: Stuttgart
- District: Heilbronn
- Subdivisions: 5

Government
  - Mayor (2016–24): Ulrich Stammer (CDU)

Area
  - Total: 49.6 km^{2} (19.2 sq mi)
- Elevation: 179 m (587 ft)

Population (2025-12-31)
  - Total: 8,489
  - Density: 171/km^{2} (443/sq mi)
- Time zone: UTC+01:00 (CET)
  - Summer (DST): UTC+02:00 (CEST)
- Postal codes: 74219
- Dialling codes: 06298
- Vehicle registration: HN
- Website: www.moeckmuehl.de

Möckmühl (German pronunciation: [mœkˈmyːl]) is a town in the district of Heilbronn, Baden-Württemberg, Germany. It is situated on the river Jagst, 22 km northeast of Heilbronn.

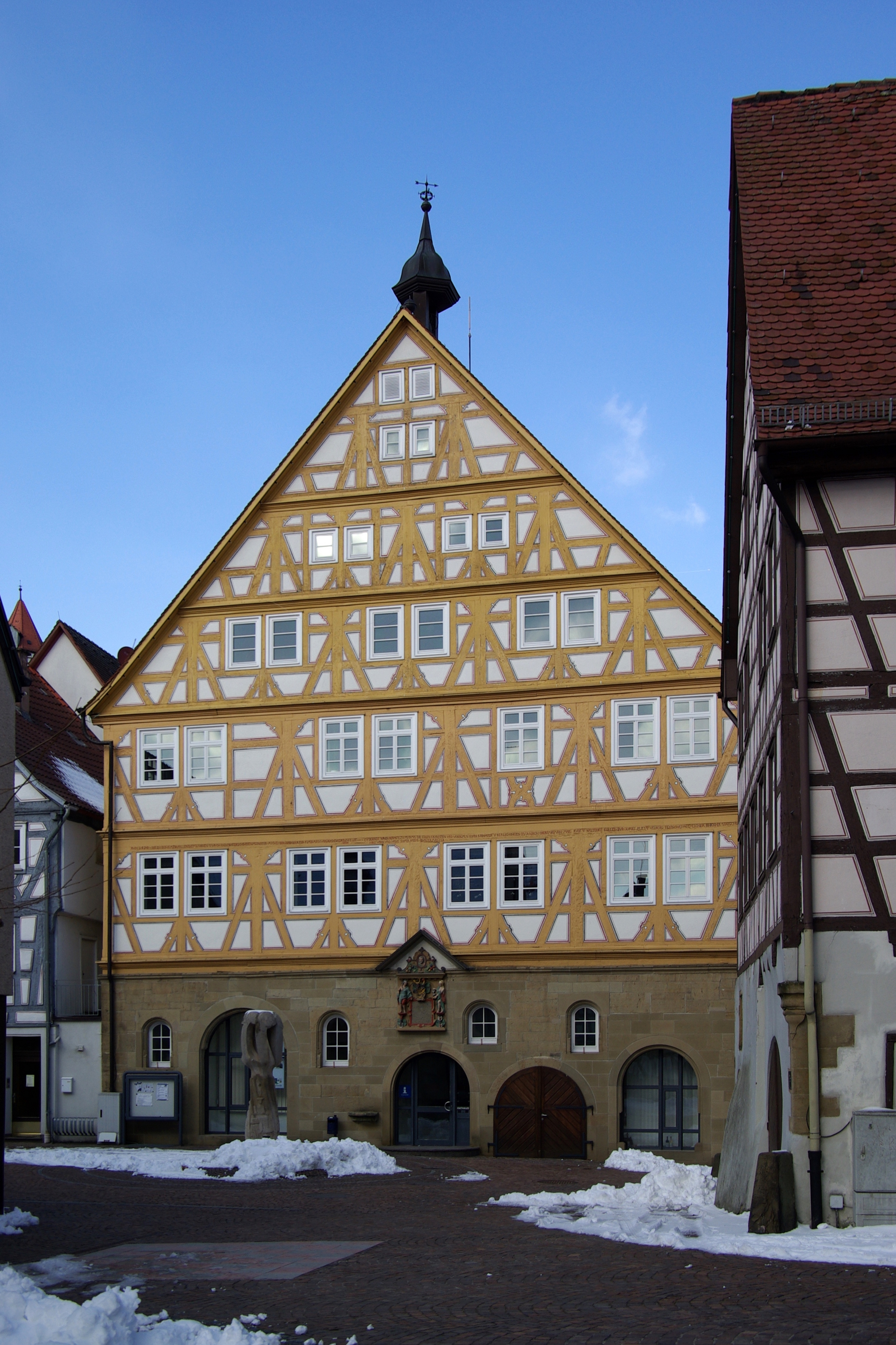
Möckmühl Town hall

== Local council ==
Elections in 2014:

- Free voters: 8 seats
- Citizen list/CDU: 6 seats
- Greens: 4 seats
- SPD: 4 seats

== Notable people ==
- Emil Ege (1833-1893), member of Landtag
- Yannick Mayer (born 1991), cyclist, lives since his birth in the hamlet Ernstein near Züttlingen and attended high school in Möckmühl

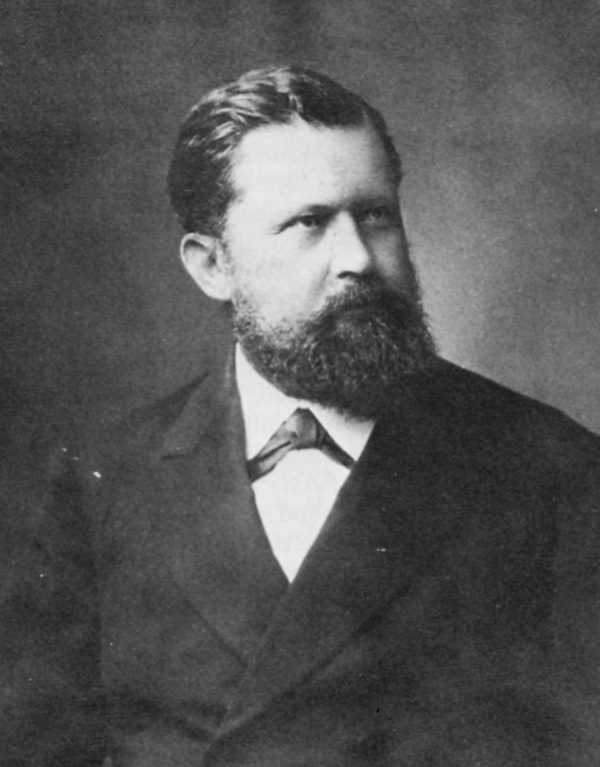
Emil Ege, 1880s

== Twin towns — sister cities ==
Möckmühl is twinned with:

- Cherasco, Italy (2001)
- Piliscsaba, Hungary (2004)
