= Neuenstadt am Kocher =

Town in Baden-Württemberg

- Town
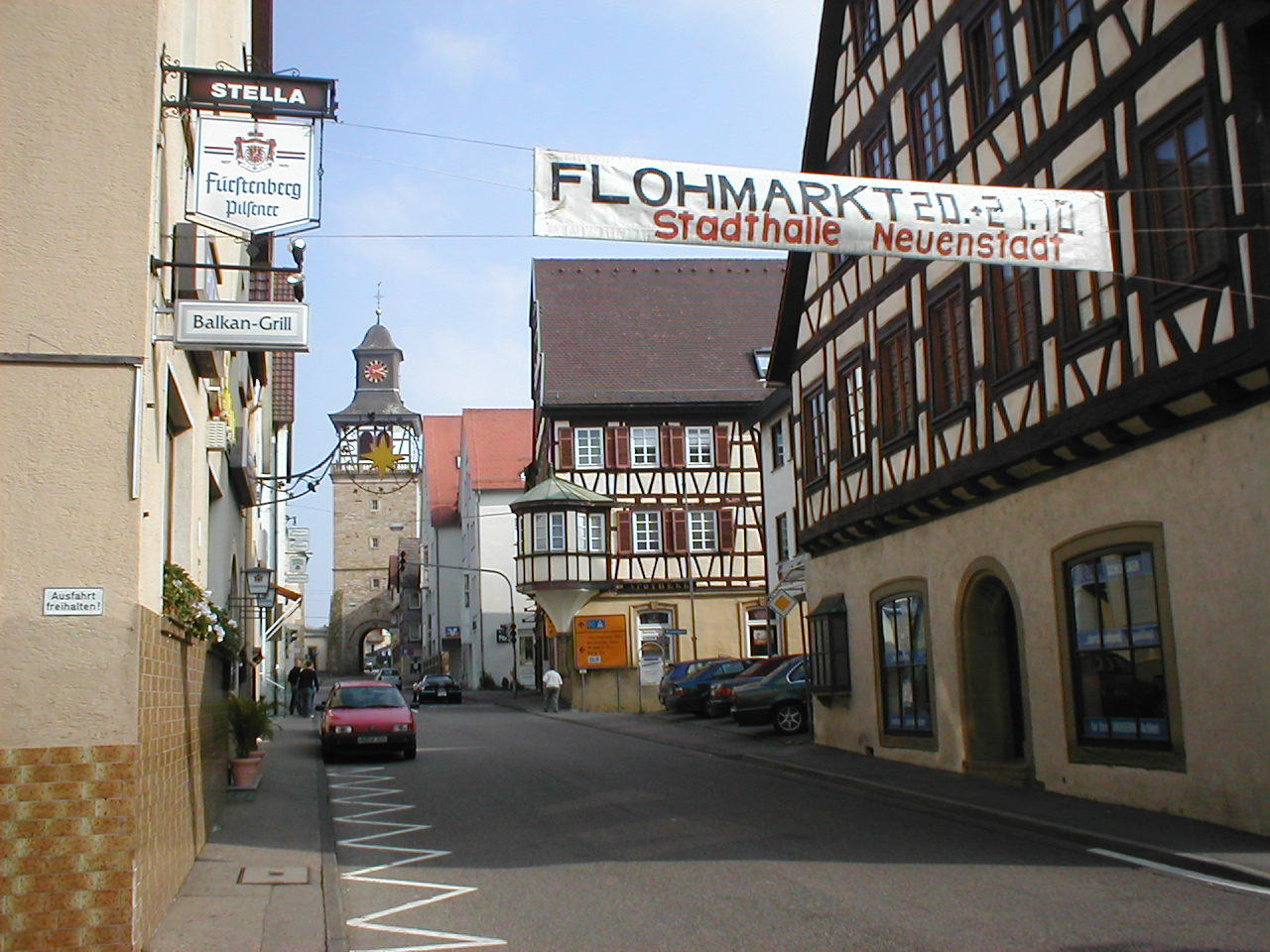
- Main street

- Coat of arms

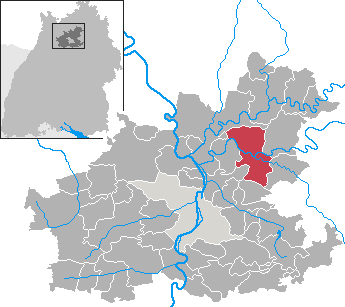
- Location of Neuenstadt am Kocher within Heilbronn district
- Interactive map of Neuenstadt am Kocher
- Location within Germany Location within Baden-Württemberg
- Coordinates: 49°14′N 9°20′E
- Country: Germany
- State: Baden-Württemberg
- Admin. region: Stuttgart
- District: Heilbronn

Government
  - Mayor (2021–29): Andreas Konrad

Area
  - Total: 41.18 km^{2} (15.90 sq mi)
- Elevation: 182 m (597 ft)

Population (2025-12-31)
  - Total: 10,218
  - Density: 248.1/km^{2} (642.7/sq mi)
- Time zone: UTC+01:00 (CET)
  - Summer (DST): UTC+02:00 (CEST)
- Postal codes: 74196
- Dialling codes: 07139
- Vehicle registration: HN
- Website: www.neuenstadt.de

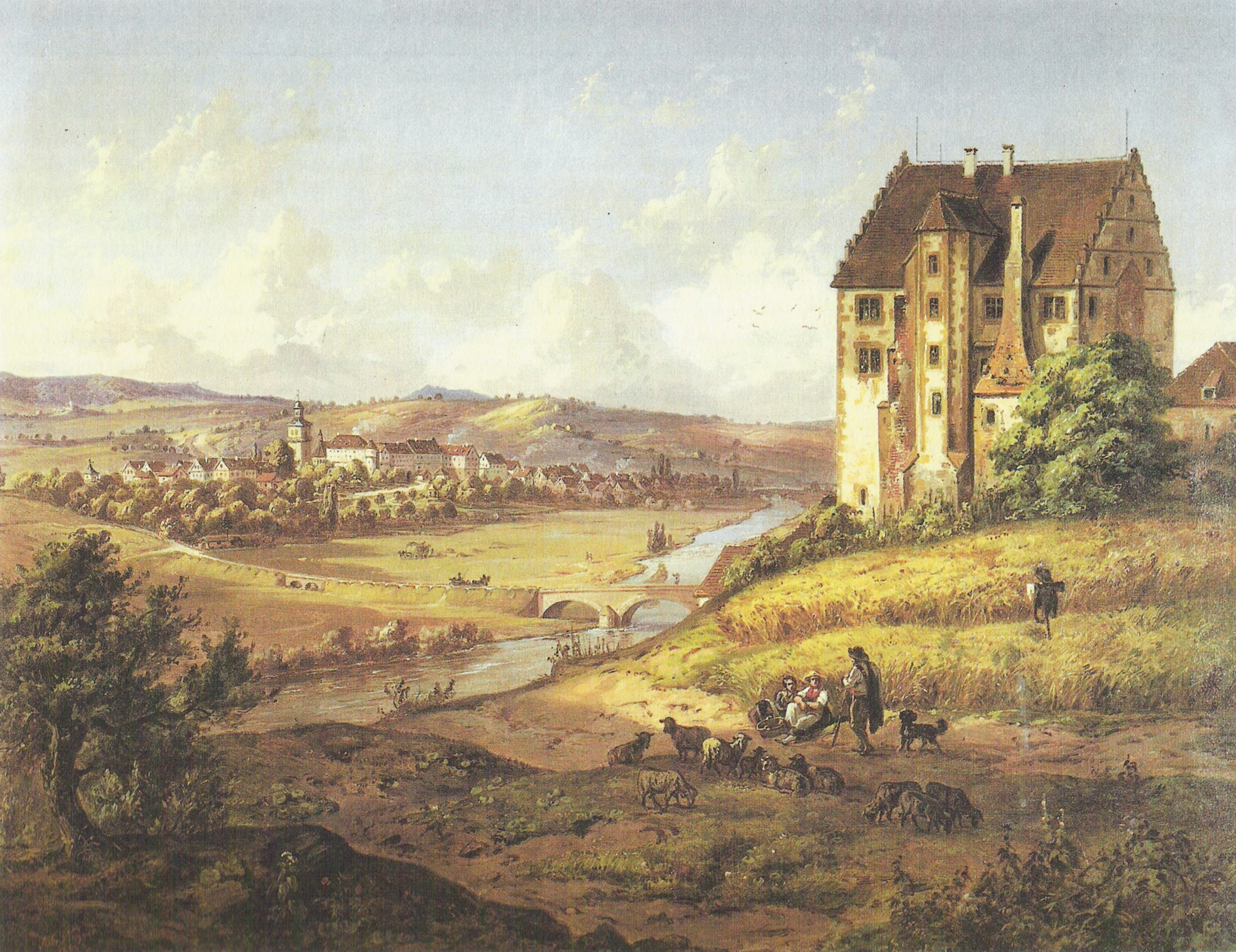
Neuenstadt viewed from the north east with Gosheim castle in the foreground, Albert Wagner, 1853

Neuenstadt, usually known as Neuenstadt am Kocher (German: [ˈnɔʏənʃtat ʔam ˈkɔxɐ]; and until as late as 1800 also known as Neuenstadt an der großen Linde) is a town in Baden-Württemberg in south-western Germany with 9,600 inhabitants. It consists of Neuenstadt, the villages of Stein am Kocher, Kochertürn, Cleversulzbach and Bürg and the hamlets Brambacher Hof (part of Kochertürn), Buchhof and Lobenbacher Hof (part of Stein). The name Neuenstadt is derived from the "der neuen Stadt" or "New Town" in English.

== Geography ==
Neuenstadt lies on the Kocher river in the east of the District of Heilbronn. It stands on a hill where the Brettach flows into the Kocher river.

=== Neighbouring communities ===
Starting from the south going in a clockwise direction, Neuenstadt is surrounded by Eberstadt, Neckarsulm, Oedheim, Bad Friedrichshall, Neudenau, Hardthausen am Kocher and Langenbrettach (all also in the district of Heilbronn). Neuenstadt is part of a joint administration agreement with Hardthausen am Kocher and Langenbrettach.

=== Districts of Neuenstadt ===
The town of Neuenstadt is subdivided into the districts of Neuenstadt itself, Stein am Kocher, Kochertürn, Cleversulzbach, Bürg and the hamlets of Brambacherhof, Buchhof and Lobenbacher Hof (of Stein).

== History ==
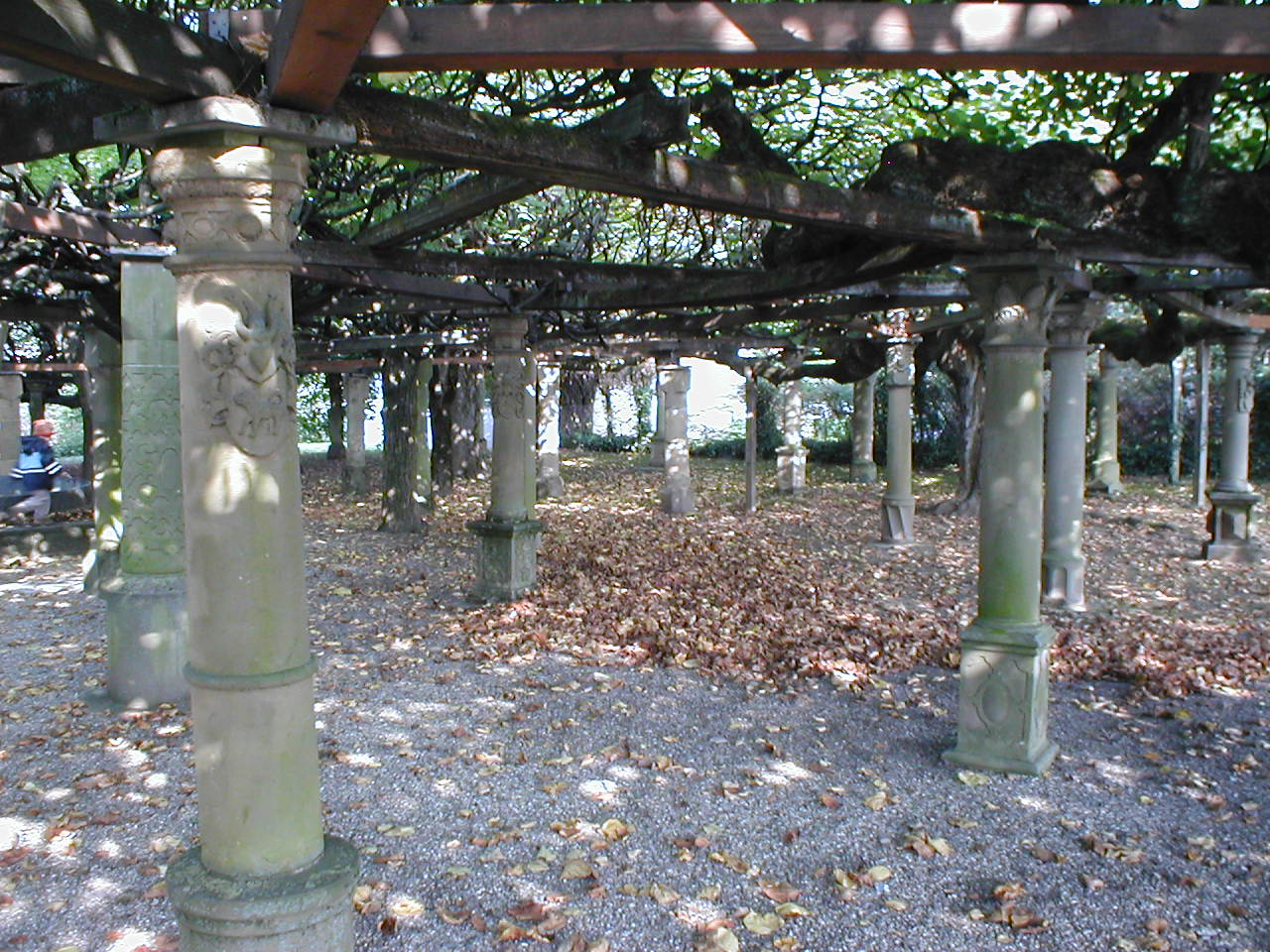
The Lime garden on the former site of the 'Great 1000-year-old Lime'

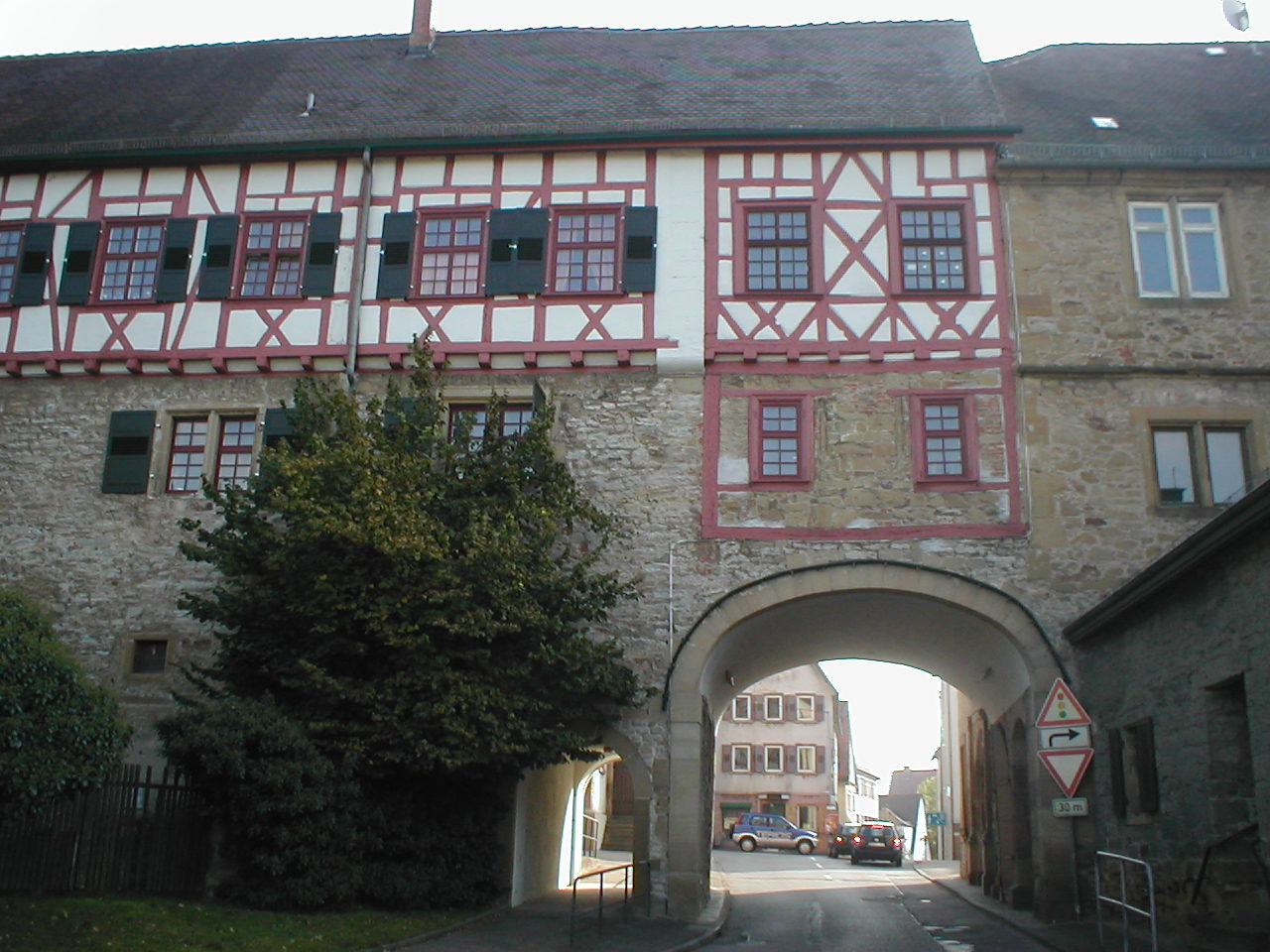
Neuenstadt Castle

Neuenstadt was originally a settlement known as Helmbund which was first mentioned in records as early as 797 A.D. Helmbund stood in the meadows of the Brettach. It is believed that the settlement moved a kilometer away at some time around the beginning of the 14th century to avoid flooding. Since then it has stood on higher ground between the Kocher and Brettach rivers. This gave rise to name New Town, or "Neue Stadt" in German. The hamlet of Helmbund subsequently all but disappeared with only the scattered ruins of the Gothic church of Helmbund remaining. Neuenstadt first fell under the reign of the rulers of Weinsberg whose lineage came to an end in 1507. As a result, it was originally a town from the Electorate of the Palatinate before falling into the area of Württemberg in 1504. In the 17th and 18th century the Württemberg-Neuenstadt branch line of the ducal house of Württemberg took up residence in Neuenstadt castle until the male lineage of dukes died out in 1742.

Towards the end of the Second World War the fortified stronghold of Neuenstadt came under heavy fire from allied forces. In April 1945, nearly 80% of Neuenstadt old town was destroyed. During fighting, one of the wires holding up the legendary lime tree that stood outside the gates of the town, which had given the town part of its name in medieval times, was torn into pieces. Subsequently, a violent storm shattered the tree. Since then, fragments of live wood, suitable for 'cuttings', were garnered, grown until rooted then large enough to hold a structure, a kind of pergola in an attractive lime garden, which now surrounds the bottom of the tree trunk that has survived. This is so substantial it gives some idea of just how enormous the original tree would have been.

=== Annexed communities ===
- January 1, 1972: Cleversulzbach
- September 1, 1972: Kochertürn
- December 31, 1972: Stein am Kocher
- January 1, 1973: Bürg

=== Religion ===
Neuenstadt underwent the influence of the Reformation in 1541 and is now home to the deanery of the Württembergisch State Church. The Evangelical Church Parish of Neuenstadt, which also encompasses Kochertürn, Stein and Bürg currently boasts 2960 members. The font in the church at Gosheim castle is said to have originally stood in Bürg church.

== Politics ==
=== District council ===
Local elections on June 13, 2004 returned the following seats:

party	amount	+/-	seats	+/-
CDU	44.2%	(+3.9)	9	(=)
BG citizens party	31.5%	(−3.5)	6	(−1)
SPD	24.3%	(−0.4)	4	(−1)

The town mayor is also member and chairman of the district council.

=== Coat of arms and flag ===
The Neuenstadt coat of arms depicts two silver shields over a silver helmet on a blue background. Blue and white are the town's official colours.

The coat of arms originate from a seal first used in the late 13th century. The colours have remained unchanged since 1535. The shields are believed to represent the two founders of the "new town" – the Lords of Weinsberg – who used three silver shields on a red background as their coat of arms. The helmet (German:'Helm') points to the origins of the town, the now lost settlement of Helmbund.

== International relations ==
Neuenstadt am Kocher belongs to a 'towns association' consisting of 36 towns in 5 European states. All towns in the association share a similar name in the indigenous language: 'New Town'.

== People, culture and architecture ==
=== Architecture ===
- From 1618 to 1781 Neuenstadt Renaissance Castle was residence to the Württemberg-Neuenstadt branch line of the royal house of Württemberg. The castle was built between 1559 and 1565 on the fortification walls of the Lords of Weinsberg's castle.
- The evangelical Nikolaus Church dates back to the 16th century. Under the chancel is a crypt which was used as a burial vault between 1659 and 1781 for the three Dukes of Württemberg-Neuenstadt.
- The castle and church join together to form the upper Gate Tower which was built in 1300 and renewed in 1703. The current tower was reconstructed following a fire in 1831.
- A number of historical timber-framed buildings still stand in Neuenstadt old town including the Old Apothecary and gate, dating back to 1801, the rectory from 1749 and the Old Forestry Commission office.
- Until April 1945 a huge lime tree stood near the castle outside the Gate Tower. It was reputed to be 1000 years old and lent the town its alternative name of Neuenstadt of the Great Lime Tree. The lime was destroyed by allied bombing during fighting near the end of the Second World War, but locals people found live shoots from the destroyed tree and grew new lime trees around the former lime. Their branches now form a shady garden, supported by approx 100 stone pillars donated by local citizens and aristocrats. The pillars in the garden were renovated between 1962 and 1981 and now bear the coats of arms of the manor houses of the Lords of Ehrenberg, the Lords of Berlichingen and the Lords of Gemmingen from 1557.
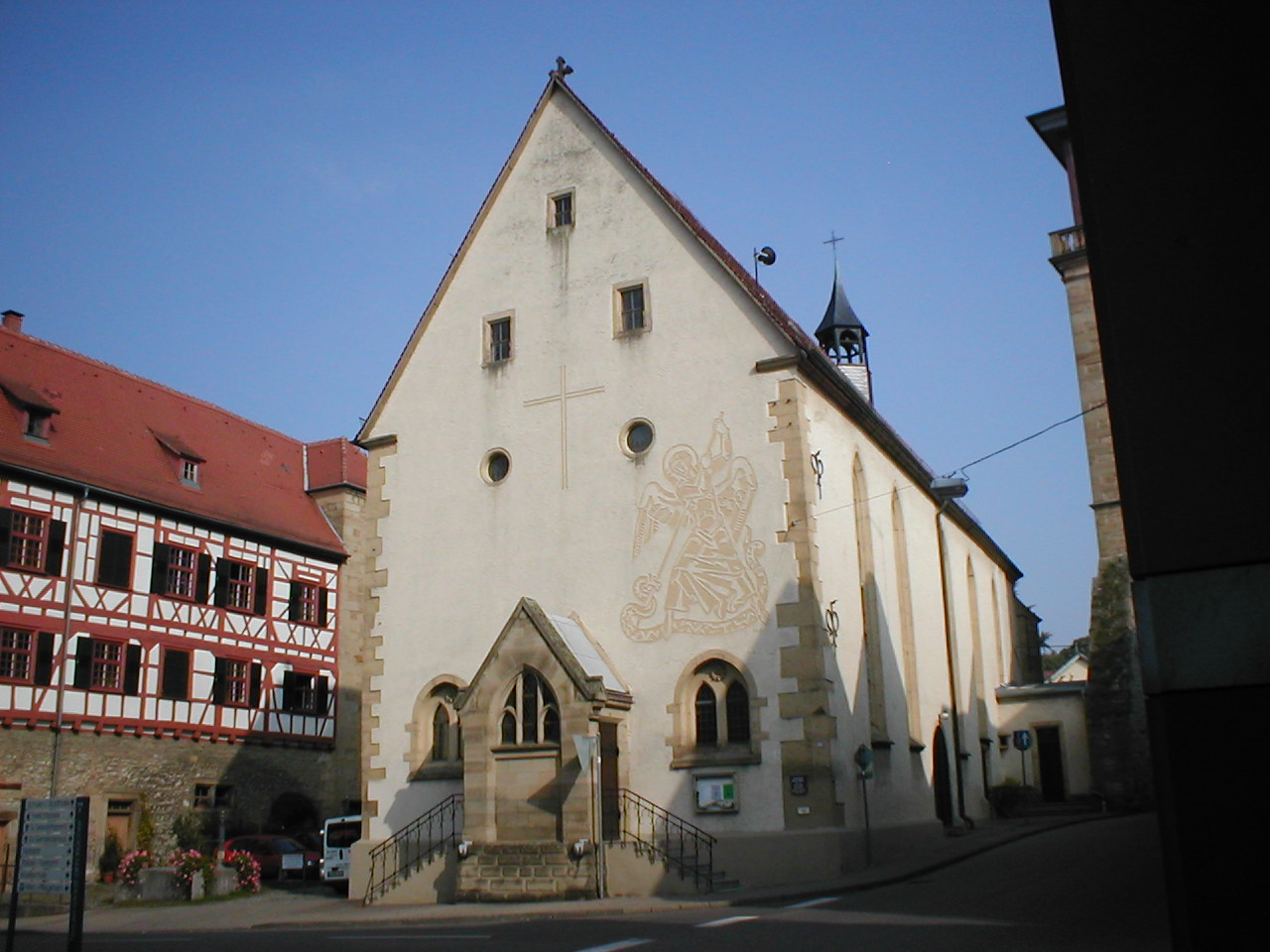
The Nikolaus Church

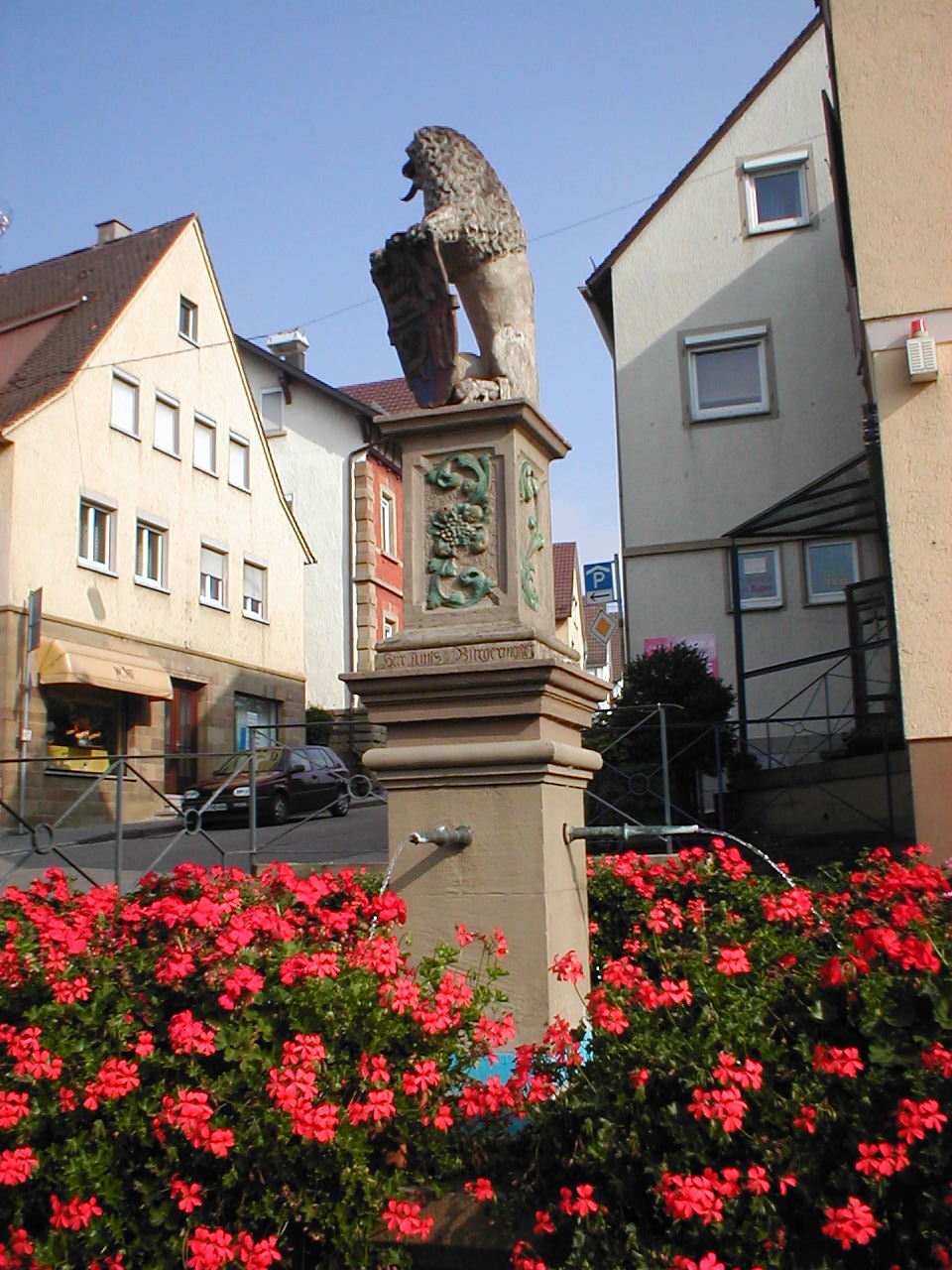
The town fountain

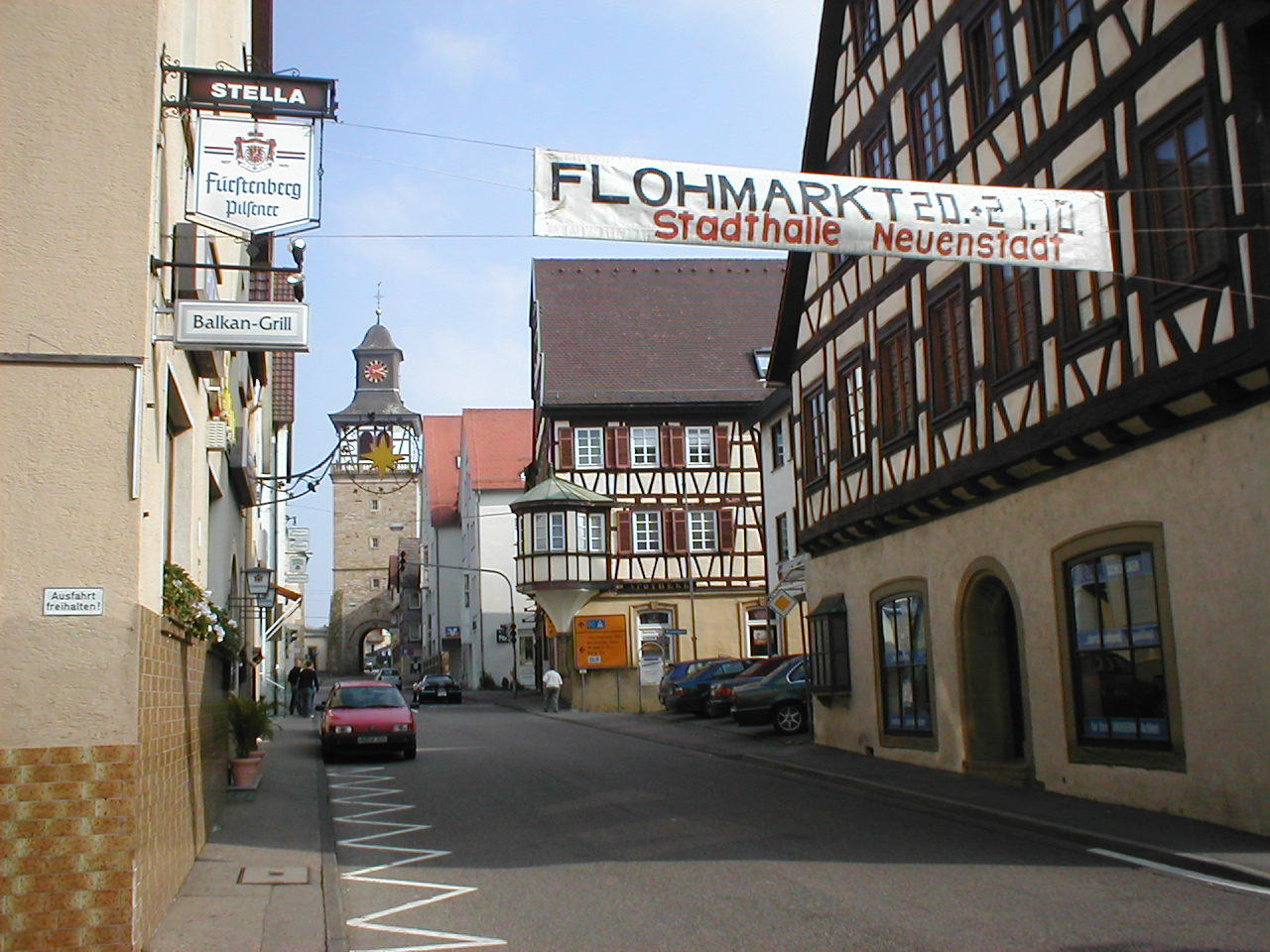
Neuenstadt High Street, Autumn 2006

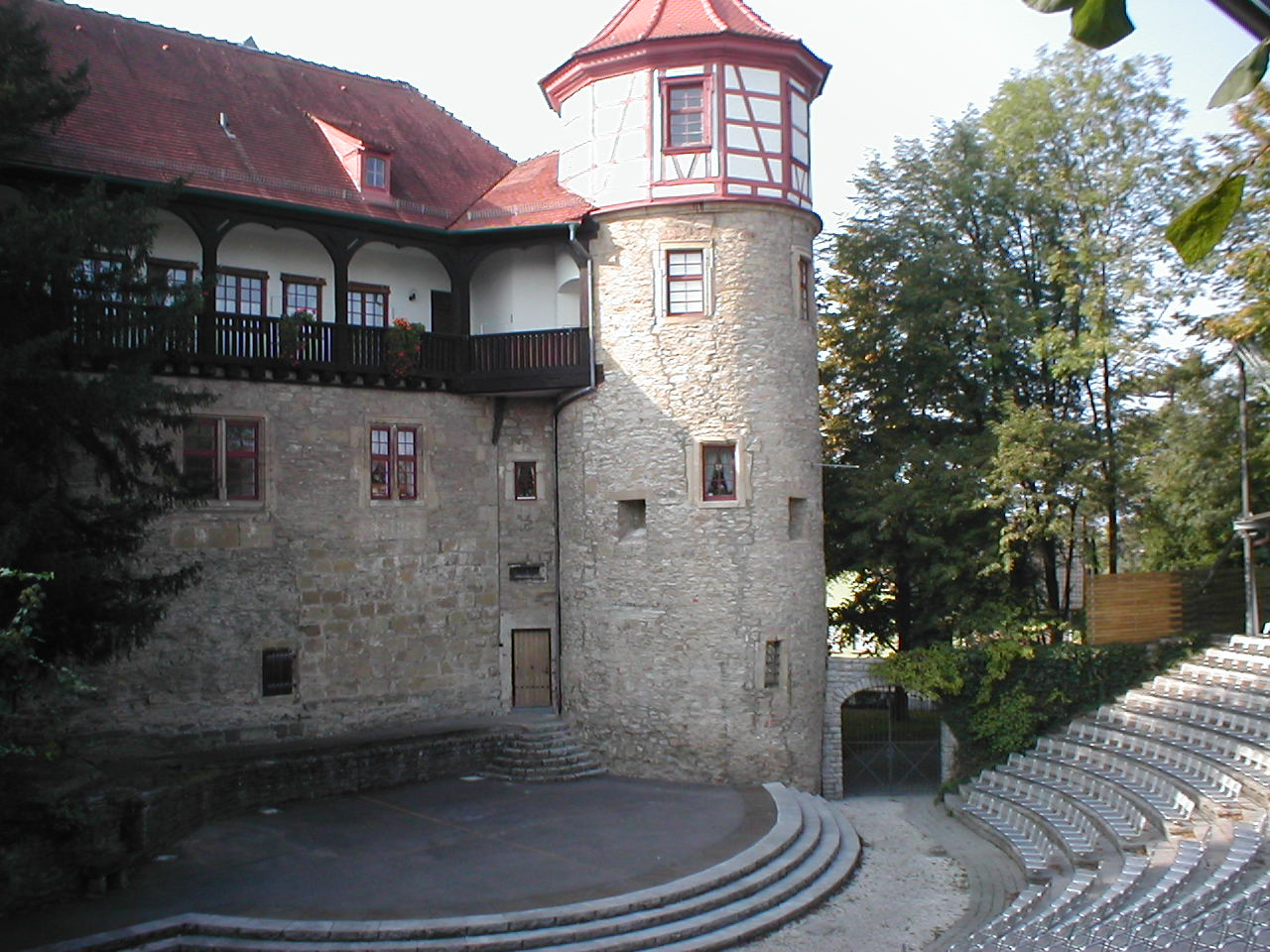
The open-air theatre in the castle moat

=== Open-air theatre ===
Since 1958, Neuenstadt has staged an open-air theatre every year between June and July in the castle moat. Some 20,000 visitors a year descend on the town to hear classical music and watch traditional local plays.

=== Museums ===
The town museum in the Schafstall was opened in 1991. As well as housing a memorial to the Mörike Family it has an exhibition of local history with rotating themes throughout the year. The museum in the Town Tower (Stadtturm) house the former tower residence and town jail. There is also a Mörike Museum in Cleversulzbach.

== Economy and Infrastructure ==
=== Transportation ===
Neuenstadt is directly on the A81 Autobahn. Between 1907 and 1993 the town was connected to the outside world via the now disused Untere Kochertalbahn railway.

=== Education ===
Neuenstadt has a primary school, the Lindenschule, two secondary school, Helmbundschule Hauptschule and the Eduard-Mörike grammar school, a special education school and a music school. In addition to the primary school in Stein am Kocher, there are also 6 state-run, 2 catholic and one evangelical kindergartens.

== Notable people of the town ==
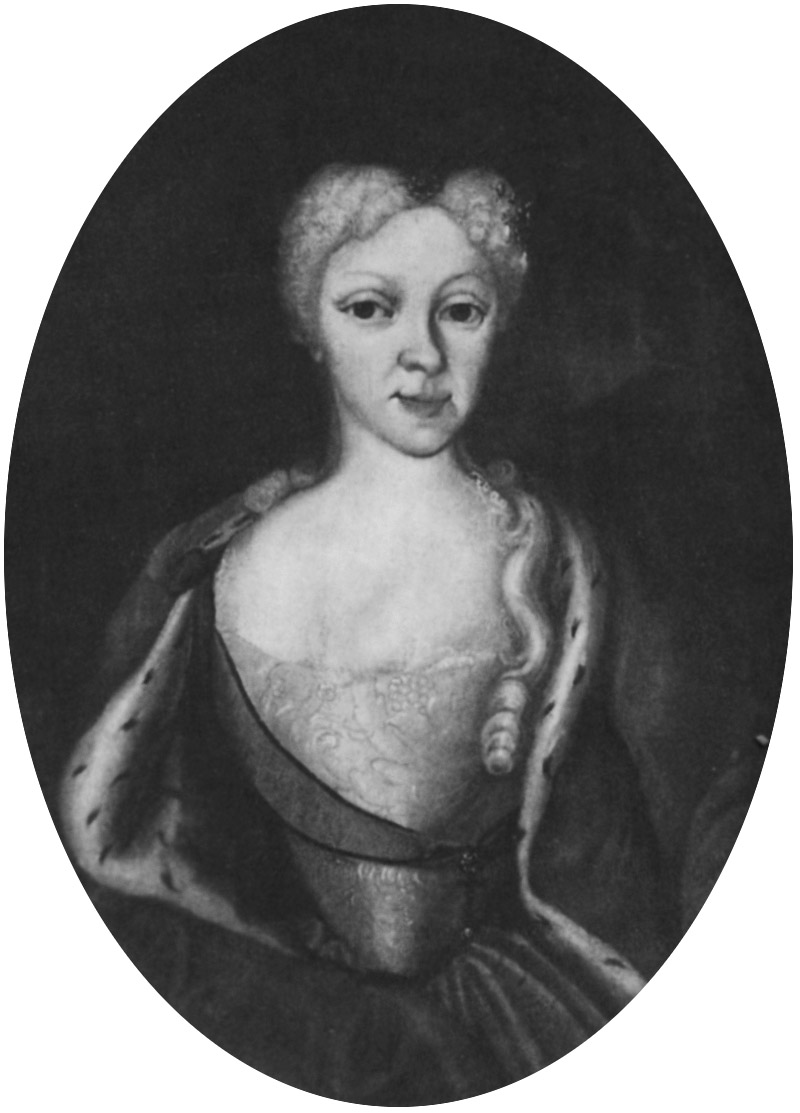
Frederica of Württemberg, between 1710 and 1740

- Friedrich Gottlieb Süskind (1767–1829), Protestant theologian
- Gustav Jäger (1832–1917), naturalist and hygienist.
- Abraham Gumbel, (DE Wiki) (1852–1930), banker and political critic of WWI

=== Aristocracy ===
- Frederick Augustus, Duke of Württemberg-Neuenstadt (1654-1716), Duke of Württemberg
- Ferdinand Willem, Duke of Württemberg-Neuenstadt (1659-1701), Duke of Württemberg
- Carl Rudolf, Duke of Württemberg-Neuenstadt (1667-1742), Duke of Württemberg
- Frederica of Württemberg (1699-1781), Abbess of the monastery Wallö, last living representative of the House of Württemberg-Neuenstadt
